= 1911 United States gubernatorial elections =

- November 7, 1911; December 12, 1911 (AZ); April 16, 1912 (LA)

8 governorships
	Majority party	Minority party
Party	Democratic	Republican
Seats before	25	21
Seats after	27	21
Seat change	▲2	Steady
Seats up	4	2
Seats won	6	2
- Democratic gain Democratic hold Republican gain Republican hold

United States gubernatorial elections were held in 1911, in eight states.

Kentucky, Louisiana, Maryland and Mississippi held their gubernatorial elections in odd numbered years, every 4 years, preceding the United States presidential election year.

Massachusetts and Rhode Island both elected their governors to a single-year term; this was the last time Rhode Island elected its governors to a single-year term. It switching to two-year-terms from the 1912 election.

Arizona and New Mexico held their first gubernatorial elections on achieving statehood.

== Results ==
State	Incumbent	Party	Status	Opposing candidates
Arizona (Held, 12 December 1911)	New state			George W. P. Hunt (Democratic) 51.46% Edmund W. Wells (Republican) 42.41% P. W. Gallentine (Socialist) 5.77% T. W. Otts (Prohibition) 0.37%
Kentucky	Augustus E. Willson	Republican	Term-limited, Democratic victory	James B. McCreary (Democratic) 52.01% Edward C. O'Rear (Republican) 44.92% Walter B. Lanfersiek (Socialist) 2.00% J. D. Rodd (Prohibition) 0.84% James H. Arnold (Socialist Labor) 0.18% S. M. Payton (Independence League) 0.05%
Louisiana (Held, 16 April 1912)	Jared Y. Sanders Sr.	Democratic	Term-limited, Democratic victory	Luther E. Hall (Democratic) 89.48% Hugh S. Suthon (Republican) 8.78% J. R. Jones (Independent) 1.74% (Democratic primary results); Luther E. Hall 43.28% John T. Michel 37.44% James B. Aswell 19.29%
Maryland	Austin Lane Crothers	Democratic	Retired, Republican victory	Phillips Lee Goldsborough (Republican) 49.26% Arthur Pue Gorman Jr. (Democratic) 47.88% Charles E. Devlin (Socialist) 1.75% John H. Dulany (Prohibition) 1.11%
Massachusetts	Eugene Foss	Democratic	Re-elected, 48.84%	Louis A. Frothingham (Republican) 47.00% James F. Carey (Socialist) 3.04% Frank N. Rand (Prohibition) 0.79% Dennis McGoff (Socialist Labor) 0.34% Scattering 0.01%
Mississippi	Edmond Noel	Democratic	Term-limited, Democratic victory	Earl Brewer (Democratic) 95.18% Summer W. Rose (Socialist) 4.82% (Democratic primary results); Earl Brewer, unopposed
New Mexico	New state			William C. McDonald (Democratic) 51.01% Holm O. Bursum (Republican) 46.05% T. C. Rivera (Socialist) 2.94%
Rhode Island	Aram J. Pothier	Republican	Re-elected, 53.36%	Lewis A. Waterman (Democratic) 42.97% Edward W. Theinert (Socialist) 1.96% Ernest L. Merry (Prohibition) 1.28% John W. Leach (Socialist Labor) 0.43%
