= Elizabeth Conwell Smith Willson =

American poet

Elizabeth Conwell Smith Willson (April 26, 1842 – October 13, 1864) was an American poet from the U.S. state of Indiana. George D. Prentice, the editor of the Louisville Journal, recognized her poetic talent and mentored her.

== Early years and education ==
Elizabeth Conwell Smith was born April 26, 1842, at Colter House, Laurel, Indiana. She was the daughter of Henry Dayton Smith and Mary (Conwell) Smith, the daughter of James Conwell, who laid out the town of Laurel. Her father died at the age of 28, on June 28, 1843, when Willson was 14 months old. Willson inherited a poetical temperament of her father, and, like him, was prone to wander alone through the woods. When she was about 13 years old, her baby brother died and she never fully recovered from the loss. It caused her to write her first poem, a bit of verse so remarkable that it was difficult for her friends to realize that she had written it. From this time, she wrote frequently. In her school days, she studied under A. W. Beighle, with Willson exhibiting talent in prose and poetic composition. At about the age of 16, after her mother's death, Willson started to Brookville College, which was then under the presidency of George Augustus Chase. She remained in the college only one year. After Chase left Brookville, he took charge of Indiana Asbury Female College in New Albany, and Willson followed him there, remaining until she graduated.

== Career ==
She met her husband, Forceythe Willson in New Albany, and they married in September, 1863, near Nulltown. After marriage, the couple spent some time at Little Genesee, New York, the childhood home of the husband. They removed to Hornellsville, New York, where Forceythe's younger brother – future Kentucky Governor Augustus E. Willson – was enrolled in school, and later to Cambridge, Massachusetts. Their newborn son, Little Dolfie, died on June 4, 1864. Elizabeth Willson died a few months later on October 13, 1864, at the age of 22. Her work was collected into a book and published posthumously by the husband.

== Selected works ==
- 1866, The poems of Elisabeth Conwell Willson
- 1866, The voice of a sea-shell
