= Forceythe Willson =

American poet (1837–1867)

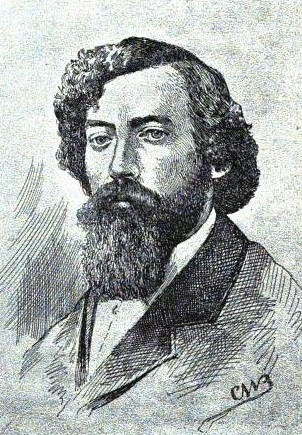
- Born: Byron Forceythe Willson; April 10, 1837; Little Genesee, New York, U.S.
- Died: February 2, 1867 (aged 29); Alfred, New York, U.S.
- Resting place: Laurel, Indiana, U.S.
- Education: Antioch College; Harvard University
- Spouse: Elizabeth Conwell Smith (m. 1863; died 1864)
- Relatives: Augustus E. Willson (brother)
- Writing career
- Genre: Poetry

Byron Forceythe Willson (April 10, 1837 – February 2, 1867) was a nineteenth-century American poet. He was the brother of Kentucky governor Augustus E. Willson.

== Personal life ==
Byron Forceythe Willson was born on April 10, 1837, in a one-roomed log house in Little Genesee, Allegany County, New York. He was the eldest son of Hiram and Ann Colvin (née Ennis) Willson. His father owned a saw mill and was postmaster of Little Genesee and superintendent of common schools in Allegany County. Around 1846, the family moved to Maysville, Kentucky. They remained there a year before moving again to Covington, Kentucky. In 1852, the family moved to New Albany, Indiana. He attended schools in Maysville, Covington and New Albany. He attended Antioch College under Horace Mann for about a year and then studied at Harvard University. He left Harvard in his second or third year due to tuberculosis. He returned home to New Albany and recovered after more than a year of treatment. His parents addressed him my his first name Byron, but he chose to go by his middle name Forceythe starting in his early manhood.

Willson's father had been a Unitarian, and his mother was a Seventh Day Baptist, but Forceythe developed his own unique beliefs about spirituality. He believed that the living could communicate with the dead, and that he was a medium through which this could be accomplished. He claimed to have had a conversation with his late father some years after his death. He also maintained that he was clairvoyant, and was able to divine the contents of unopened letters, as well as some information about their authors, by placing the envelope to his forehead.

== Career ==
Willson became an editorial writer for the Louisville Journal (later part of the Louisville Courier-Journal) under George D. Prentice. His missives often defended the Union cause in the Civil War. He also published some of his early poetry in the Journal. He published his most famous work, "The Old Sergeant" on January 1, 1863.

== Personal life ==
In 1863, Willson married Elizabeth Conwell Smith, a poet from New Albany. They moved to a house on Mount Auburn Road in Cambridge, Massachusetts, in 1864. He moved there to oversee the education of his brother Augustus. His wife died in Cambridge in October 1864, after the loss of their baby. Both Elizabeth, and the child are buried in Laurel, Indiana. From that time until his own death, many who were with him observed him having conversations with the spirit of his dead wife. Shortly following her death, he told a friend "It has left me neither afflicted nor bereaved... And strangest of yet all, the blessed Presence is at times so plain that I can scarcely believe the tender tie of her embodiment is broken."

On a return trip to New Albany, he was stricken with a pulmonary hemorrhage. He died on February 2, 1867, in Alfred. He was buried next to his wife in Laurel.

== Selected works of Forceythe Willson ==
- "The Old Sergeant", 1863
- "In State"
