= 1906 United States Senate election in Kentucky =

- January 16, 1906
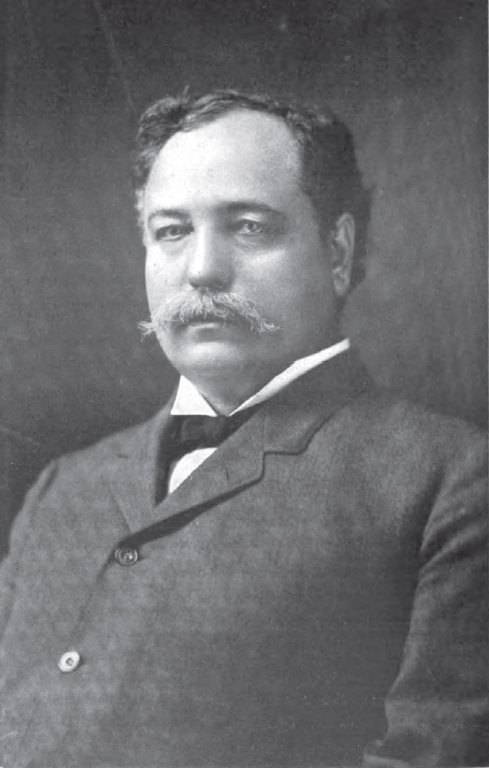

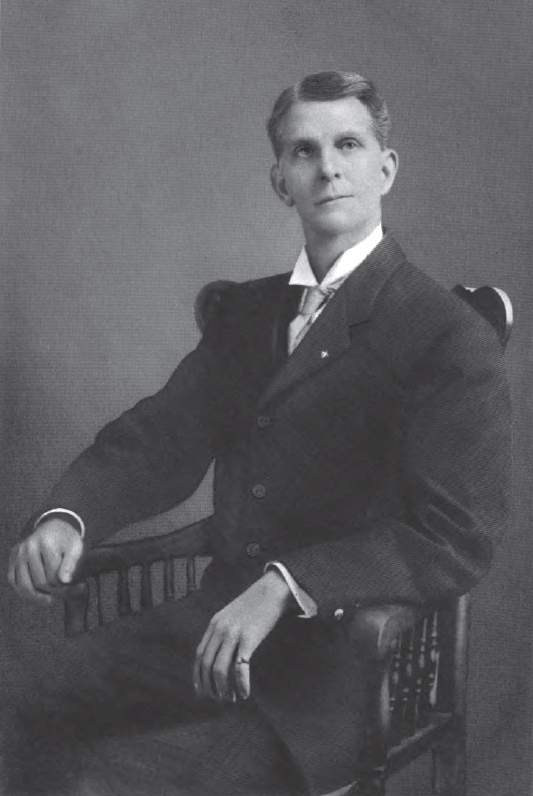
Nominee	Thomas H. Paynter	William H. Cox
Party	Democratic	Republican
Senate ballot	22 (78.6%)	5 (17.9%)
House ballot	57 (72.2%)	22 (27.8%)
- Blue denotes members voting for Paynter and red denotes those voting for Cox. Orange denotes Cox himself, who voted for another Republican.
U.S. Senator before election
J. C. S. Blackburn
Democratic
Elected U.S. Senator
Thomas H. Paynter
Democratic

The 1906 United States Senate election in Kentucky was held on January 16, 1906, after an initial election on January 9, 1906. Democratic candidate Thomas H. Paynter was elected by the Kentucky General Assembly to the United States Senate. The election was held twice due to ambiguity in the law setting the election date.

== Democratic nomination ==
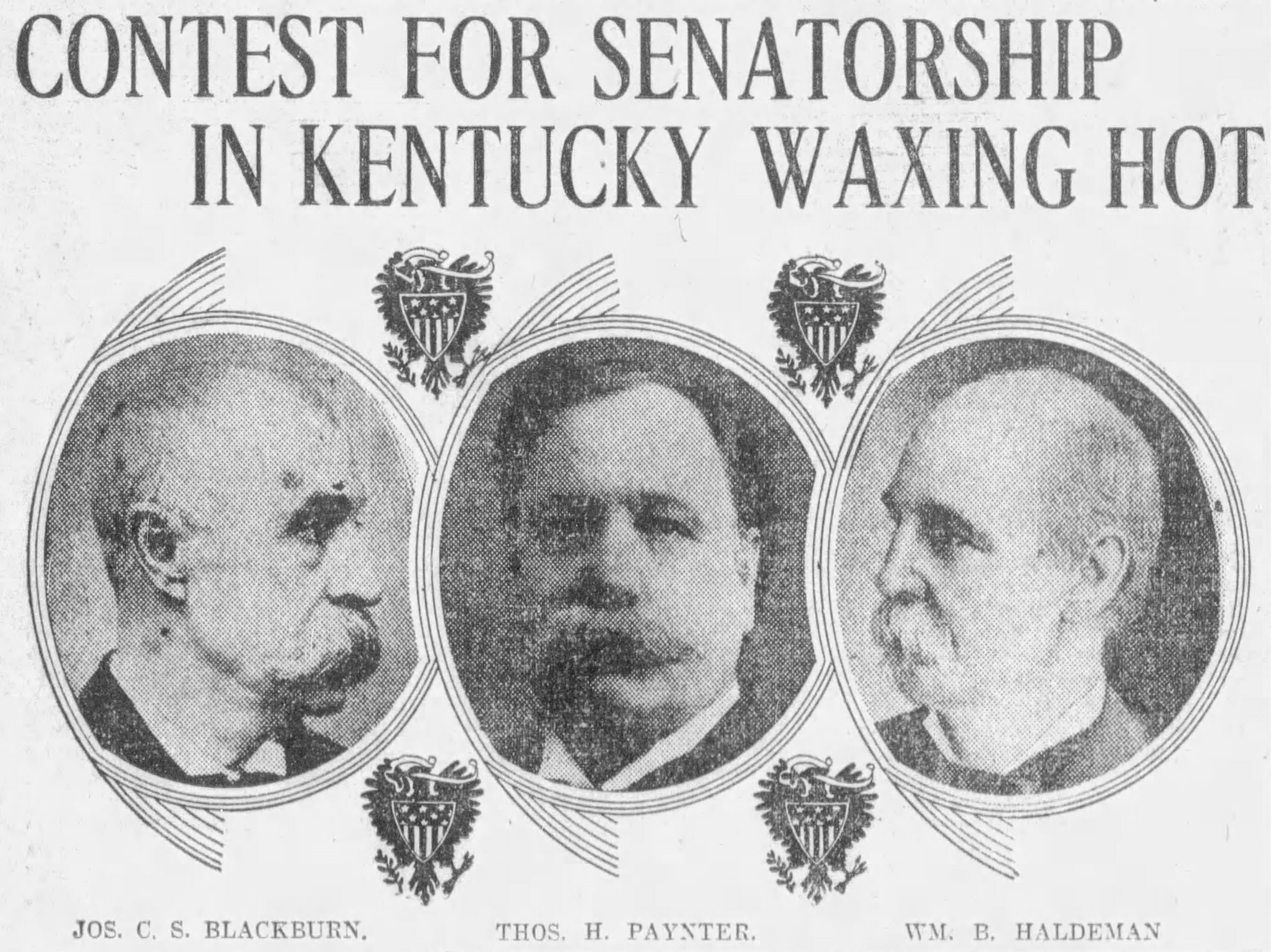
This newspaper article depicts the three professed candidates for the nomination: Blackburn, Paynter, and Haldeman.

The Democratic Party chose to select its candidate by legislative caucus. Incumbent senator J. C. S. Blackburn was defeated for renomination on January 2, 1906, by judge of the Kentucky Court of Appeals and former congressman Thomas H. Paynter.

=== Candidates ===
- J. C. S. Blackburn, U.S. senator (1885–1897, 1901–1907)
- William Birch Haldeman
- Thomas H. Paynter, judge of the Kentucky Court of Appeals (1895–1906) and U.S. representative for Kentucky's 9th congressional district (1889–1895)

=== Results ===
Caucus vote of Democratic senators

Caucus vote of Democratic representatives
Paynter
Blackburn
Haldeman
Smith
Republicans

Democratic caucus results
Candidate	Senate	House	Total	%
Thomas H. Paynter	17	42	59	56.2
J. C. S. Blackburn	10	24	34	32.4
William Birch Haldeman	3	7	10	9.5
David Highbaugh Smith (Note: Smith was not an announced candidate for the nomination.)	1	1	2	1.9
Total votes	31	74	105	100.0

== Republican nominatiom ==
The Republican Party chose to select its candidate by legislative caucus, with senator William H. Cox winning the nomination unanimously on January 3, 1906.

=== Candidates ===
- William H. Cox, member of the Kentucky Senate (1900–1907)

== Elections ==
=== First election ===
==== Senate ====
1906 United States Senate election in Kentucky (first Senate ballot)
Party	Candidate	Votes	%
Democratic	Thomas H. Paynter	31	83.8
Republican	William H. Cox	5	13.5
Republican	Curtis F. Burnam	1	2.7
Total votes		37	100.0

==== House of Representatives ====
1906 United States Senate election in Kentucky (first House ballot)
Party	Candidate	Votes	%
Democratic	Thomas H. Paynter	70	73.7
Republican	William H. Cox	25	26.3
Total votes		95	100.0

=== Second election ===
==== Senate ====
1906 United States Senate election in Kentucky (Senate)
Party	Candidate	Votes	%
Democratic	Thomas H. Paynter	22	78.6
Republican	William H. Cox	5	17.9
Republican	Curtis F. Burnam	1	3.6
Total votes		28	100.0
Democratic hold			

==== House of Representatives ====
1906 United States Senate election in Kentucky (House of Representatives)
Party	Candidate	Votes	%
Democratic	Thomas H. Paynter	55	72.2
Republican	William H. Cox	22	27.8
Total votes		79	100.0
Democratic hold			

== See also ==
- 1906–07 United States Senate elections

== Sources ==
- "Journal of the Senate of the Commonwealth of Kentucky, 1906". Journals of the Kentucky General Assembly. Frankfort, Kentucky – via HathiTrust.
