= George M. Davison =

American politician

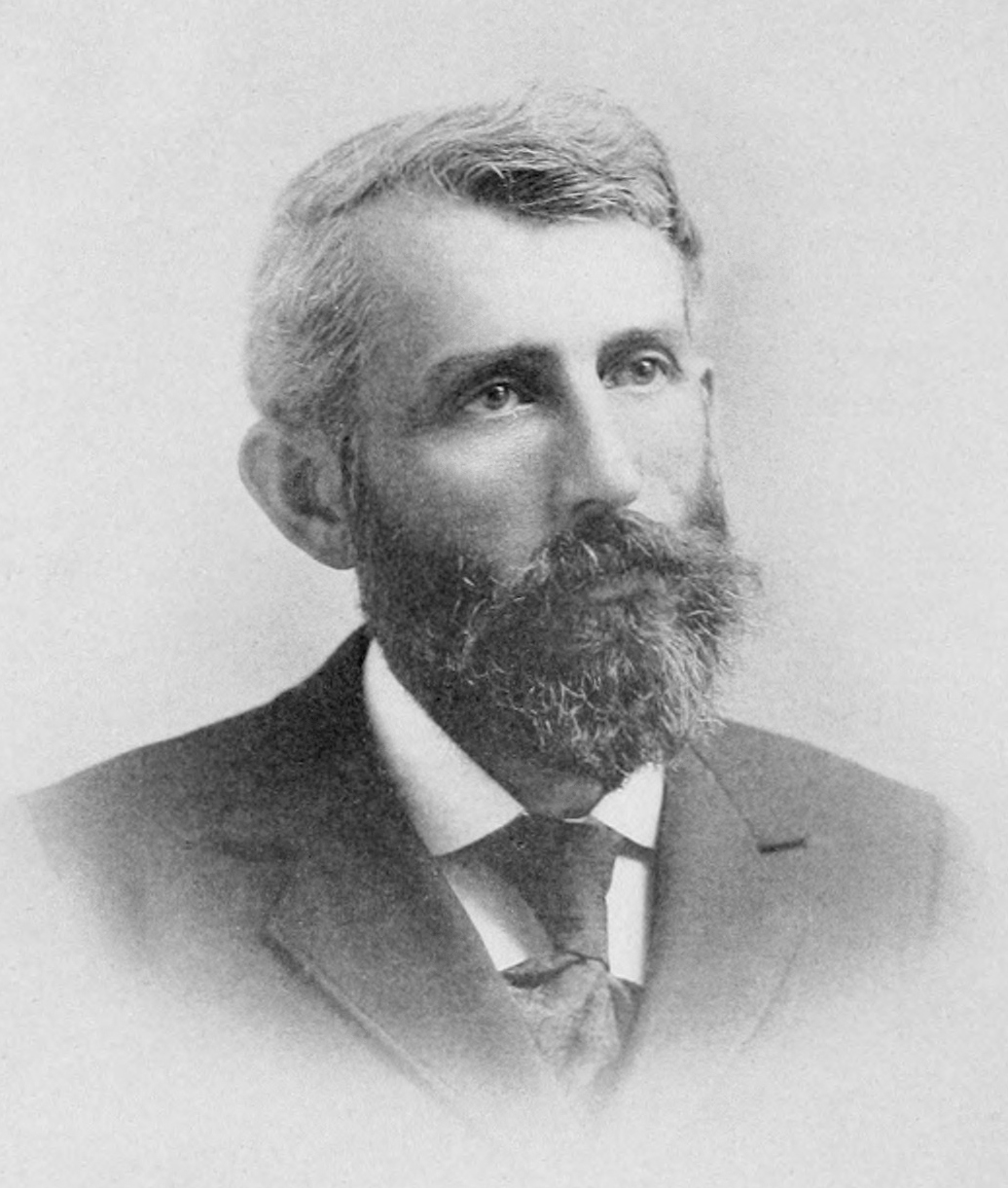

Member of the U.S. House of Representatives from Kentucky's 8th district
- In office March 4, 1897 – March 3, 1899
- Preceded by: James B. McCreary
- Succeeded by: George G. Gilbert

Personal details
- Born: March 23, 1855 Stanford, Kentucky
- Died: December 18, 1912 (aged 57) Stanford, Kentucky
- Resting place: Buffalo Springs Cemetery
- Party: Republican
- Profession: Lawyer
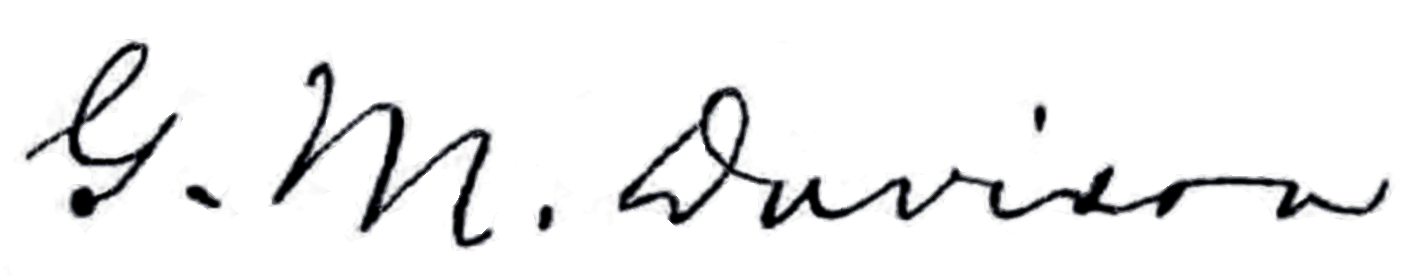
- Signature

George Mosby Davison (March 23, 1855 – December 18, 1912) was a U.S. representative from Kentucky.

Born in Stanford, Kentucky, Davison attended the common schools, Stanford Academy, and Meyers Academy. He studied law. He was admitted to the bar in 1879 and commenced practice in Stanford, Kentucky. He was appointed collector of internal revenue for the sixth Kentucky district and served from July 20, 1885, to June 30, 1889. He was appointed master of chancery or commissioner of the Lincoln circuit court in 1886, and served until 1893, when he resigned. He served as member of the State house of representatives 1886–1888. He served as judge of the Lincoln County Court 1894–1896.

Davison was elected as a Republican to the Fifty-fifth Congress (March 4, 1897 – March 3, 1899). He was an unsuccessful candidate for reelection in 1898 to the Fifty-sixth Congress. He resumed the practice of law. He served as assistant United States attorney for the eastern district of Kentucky 1900–1910. He retired from public life. He died in Stanford, Kentucky, December 18, 1912. He was interred in Buffalo Springs Cemetery.

U.S. House of Representatives
Preceded by James B. McCreary	Member of the U.S. House of Representatives from Kentucky's 8th congressional district 1897 – 1899	Succeeded by George G. Gilbert
