= Ollie Murray James =

American politician (1871–1918)

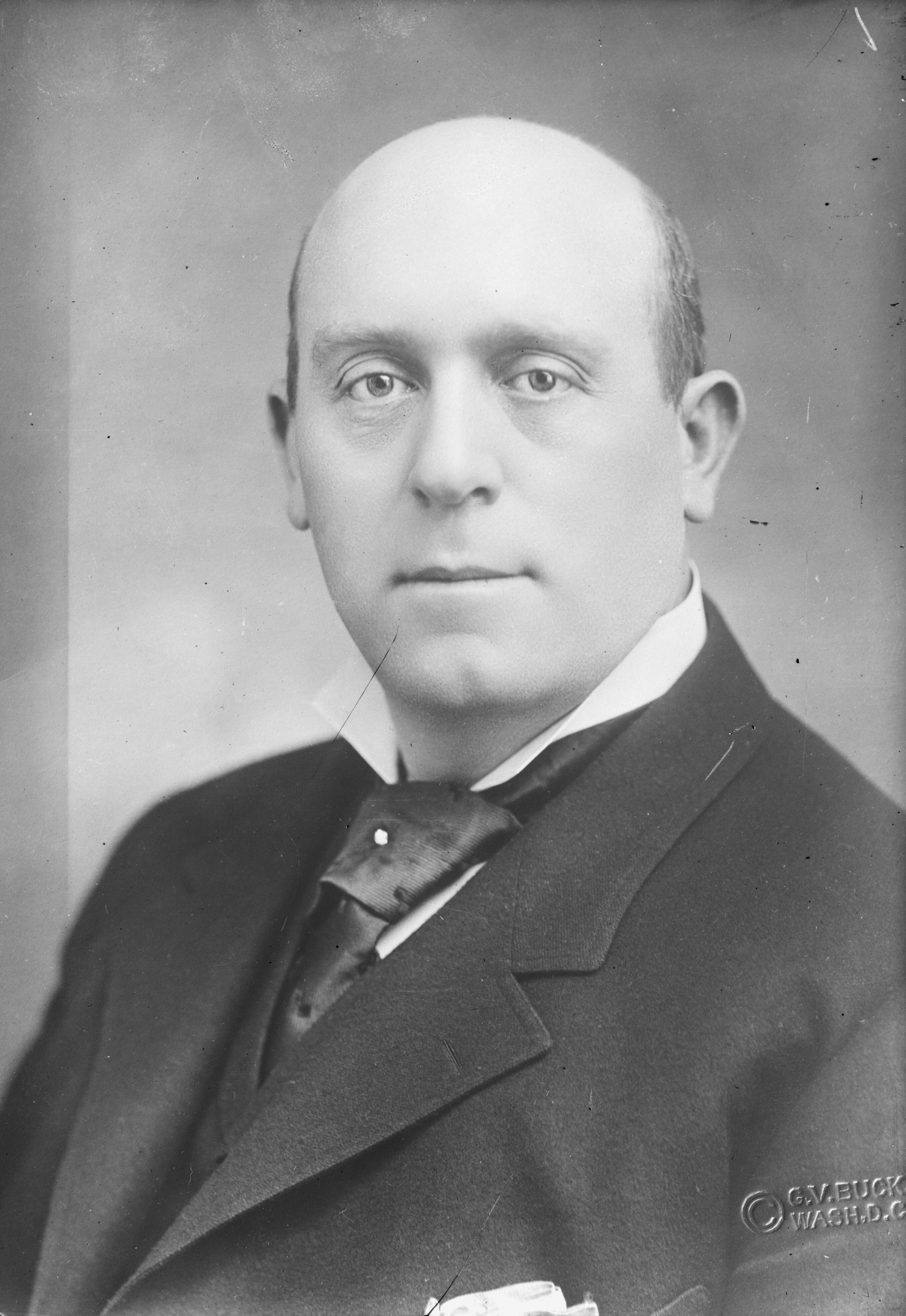
- Portrait c. 1909–1918

United States Senator from Kentucky
- In office March 4, 1913 – August 28, 1918
- Preceded by: Thomas H. Paynter
- Succeeded by: George B. Martin

Member of the U.S. House of Representatives from Kentucky's 1st district
- In office March 4, 1903 – March 3, 1913
- Preceded by: Charles K. Wheeler
- Succeeded by: Alben W. Barkley

Personal details
- Born: July 27, 1871 Marion, Kentucky, U.S.
- Died: August 28, 1918 (aged 47) Baltimore, Maryland, U.S.
- Party: Democratic

Ollie Murray James (July 27, 1871 – August 28, 1918) was an American politician. A Democrat, he represented Kentucky in the United States House of Representatives and the United States Senate.

== Biography ==
James was on July 27, 1871, in Marion, Kentucky. As a teenager, he served as a page in the Kentucky General Assembly. James studied law and was admitted to the bar in 1891, beginning his practice that year.

In 1902, James sought and won election to the United States House of Representatives from Kentucky's 1st district, the far western part of the state. He was re-elected to the House four times, serving there from March 4, 1903, to March 3, 1913. He was the Chairman of the Democratic National Conventions of 1912 and 1916.

In 1912, James decided to give up his House seat to seek election to the United States Senate. He won that election in the Kentucky state legislature on 9 and 16 January 1912 and was sworn in on March 4, 1913. He served as chairman of the Senate Committee on Patents. His capabilities as a debater came to be recognized and feared in the Senate, as journalist and historian Claude G. Bowers observed:

More than six feet tall and large in proportion, with an immense head and a smoothly shaven face that reflected every feeling, and with a powerful voice that could absorb all other sounds, he would have been a commanding figure in any legislative assembly. In cold print his speeches lacked finish, but he relied on force, and his delivery accentuated the power of his argument. In debate he rode the whirlwind to direct the storm, overwhelming his opponent with ridicule when unable to combat him with logic. I always felt sorry for his victims.

James died during his term of office in a hospital in Baltimore, Maryland on August 28, 1918, aged 47.

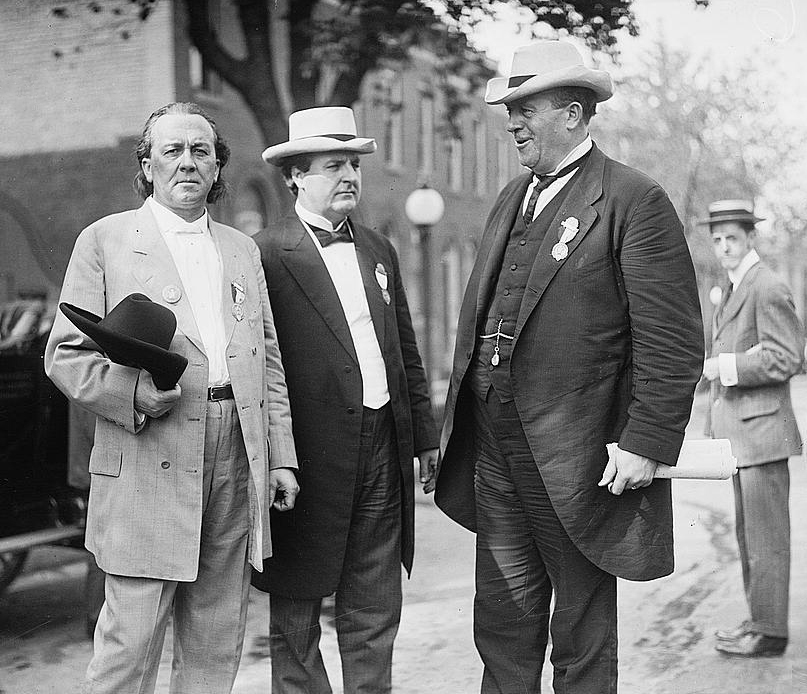
James K. Vardaman, James Thomas Heflin, and James in 1912

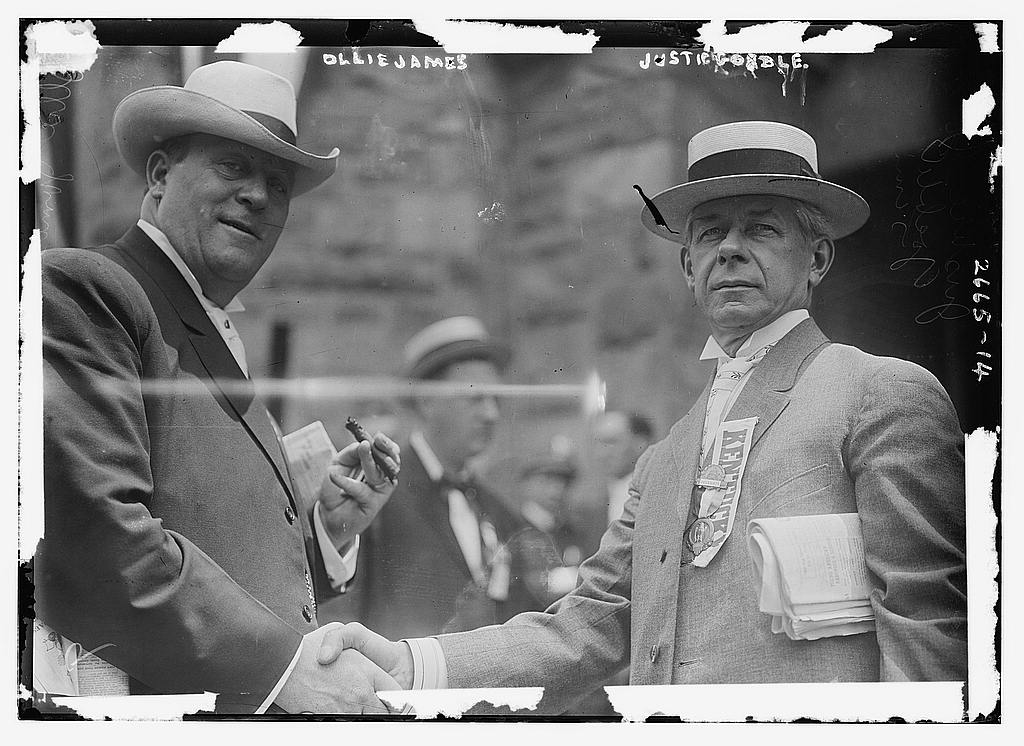
James and Justus Goebel at the 1912 Democratic National Convention

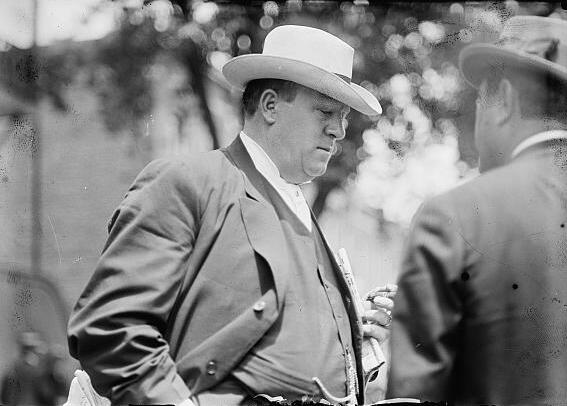
Ollie M. James, photo from the Harris & Ewing photo studio

== See also ==
- List of members of the United States Congress who died in office (1900–1949)

U.S. House of Representatives
| Preceded by Charles K. Wheeler | Member of the U.S. House of Representatives from Kentucky's 1st congressional district 1903-1913 | Succeeded by Alben Barkley |
U.S. Senate
| Preceded by Thomas H. Paynter | U.S. senator (Class 2) from Kentucky; 1913-1918 | Succeeded by George B. Martin |
