= 1911 Kentucky gubernatorial election =

- November 7, 1911
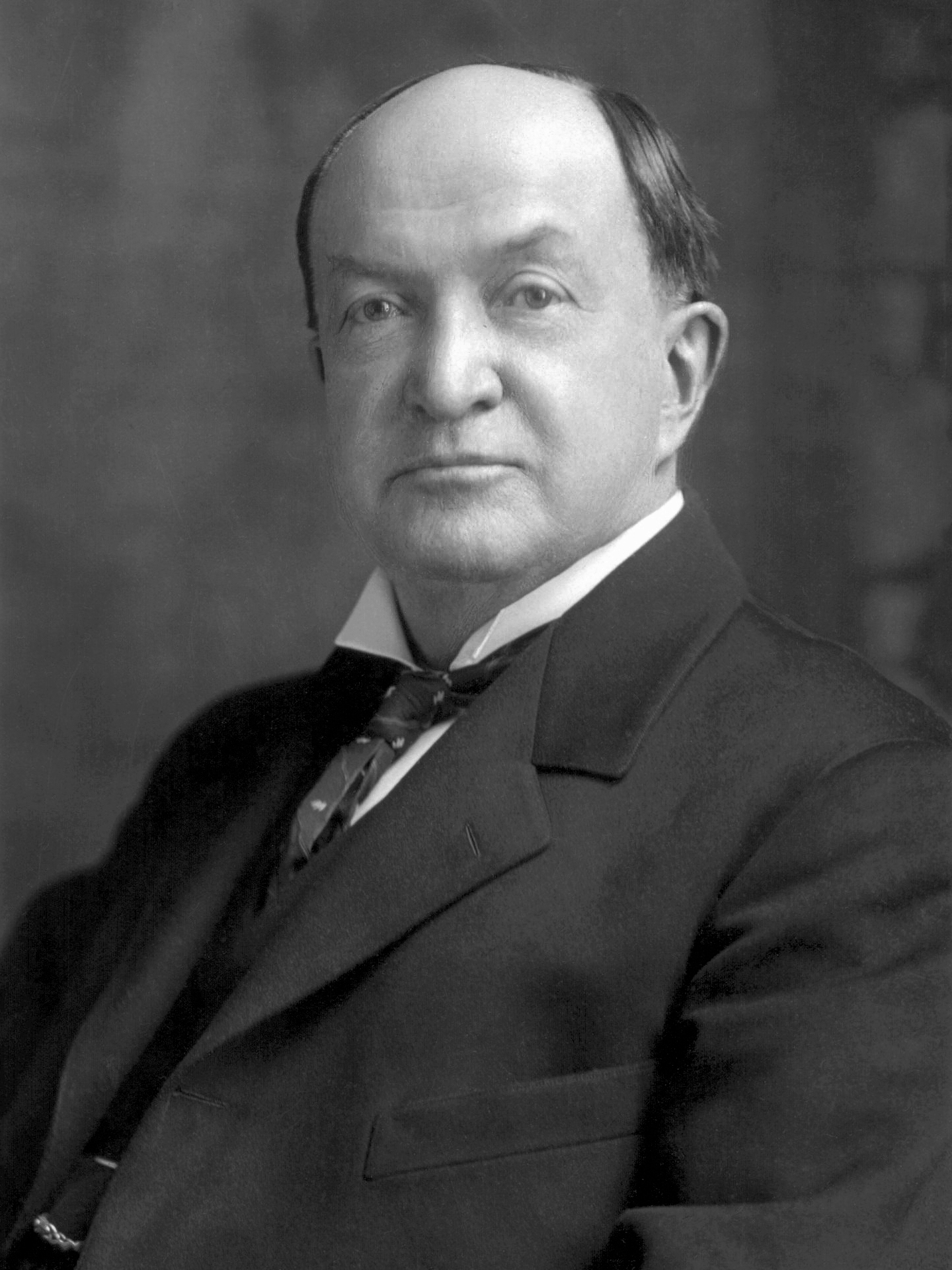

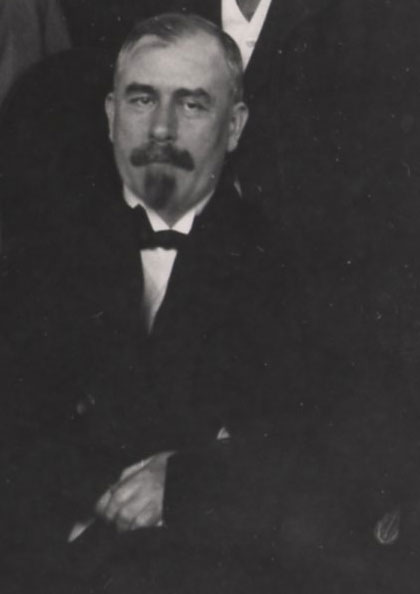
| Nominee | James B. McCreary | Edward C. O'Rear |
| Party | Democratic | Republican |
| Popular vote | 226,549 | 195,672 |
| Percentage | 52.01% | 44.92% |
- McCreary: 40–50% 50–60% 60–70% 70–80% O'Rear: 40–50% 50–60% 60–70% 70–80% 80–90%
Governor before election
Augustus E. Willson
Republican
Elected Governor
James B. McCreary
Democratic

The 1911 Kentucky gubernatorial election was held on November 7, 1911. Democratic nominee James B. McCreary defeated Republican nominee Edward C. O'Rear with 52.01% of the vote.

== General election ==
=== Candidates ===
Major party candidates

- James B. McCreary, Democratic
- Edward C. O'Rear, Republican

Other candidates

- Walter B. Lanfersiek, Socialist
- J. D. Rodd, Prohibition
- James H. Arnold, Socialist Labor
- S. M. Payton, Independent

=== Results ===
1911 Kentucky gubernatorial election
| Party | Candidate | Votes | % | ±% |
|---|---|---|---|---|
| Democratic | James B. McCreary | 226,549 | 52.01% | +5.14% |
| Republican | Edward C. O'Rear | 195,672 | 44.92% | −6.25% |
| Socialist | Walter B. Lanfersiek | 8,718 | 2.00% | +1.64% |
| Prohibition | J. D. Rodd | 3,673 | 0.84% | −0.68% |
| Socialist Labor | James H. Arnold | 800 | 0.18% | +0.09% |
| Independent | S. M. Payton | 218 | 0.05% | N/A |
| Majority | | 30,877 | 7.09% | |
| Turnout | | | | |
| Democratic gain from Republican | | Swing | | |
