= William P. Thorne =

American politician (1845–1928)

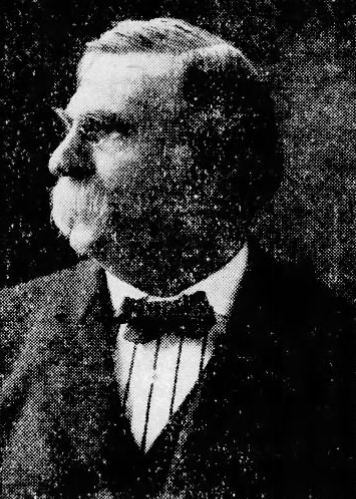

29th Lieutenant Governor of Kentucky
- In office December 8, 1903 – December 10, 1907
- Governor: J. C. W. Beckham
- Preceded by: Newton Willard Utley (acting)
- Succeeded by: William Hopkinson Cox

Personal details
- Born: March 5, 1845 Shelby County, Kentucky, U.S.
- Died: May 28, 1928 (aged 83)
- Party: Democratic

William Pryor Thorne (March 5, 1845 – May 28, 1928) was an American politician who served as the 29th lieutenant governor of Kentucky under Governor J. C. W. Beckham from 1903 to 1907. He was born in Shelby County, Kentucky and died in 1928.

Political offices
Preceded by J. C. W. Beckham	Lieutenant Governor of Kentucky; 1903–1907	Succeeded by William Hopkinson Cox
