= Edward C. O'Rear =

American politician and judge (1863–1961)

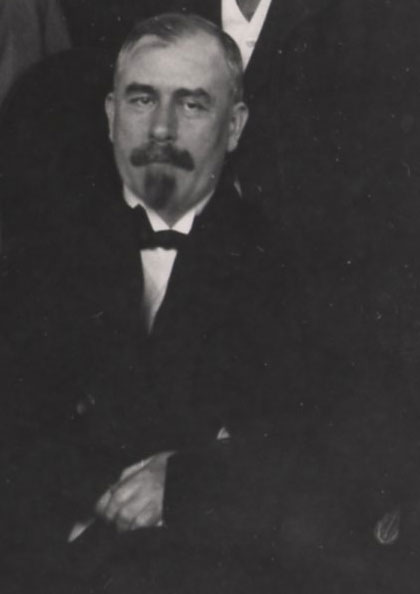
- O'Rear in 1908

Justice of the Kentucky Court of Appeals
- In office 1900–1911

Personal details
- Born: Edward Clay O'Rear; February 2, 1863 Montgomery County, Kentucky, US
- Died: September 12, 1961 (aged 98) Woodford County, Kentucky, US
- Party: Republican
- Spouse(s): Virginia Lee Hazelrigg; Mabel Taylor
- Children: 5
- Profession: Lawyer

Edward Clay O'Rear (February 2, 1863 – September 12, 1961) was an American politician who served on the Kentucky Court of Appeals and was a Republican candidate for the United States House of Representatives in 1888 and for governor of Kentucky in 1911. His father died when O'Rear was very young, and he began work as a printer's devil to help support his mother and fourteen siblings. Eventually, he became editor of the Mountain Scorcher newspaper and read law under its publisher. He gained admission to the bar in 1882.

In 1888, O'Rear failed to unseat incumbent Congressman William P. Taulbee, but in 1894, he was elected county judge of Montgomery County, Kentucky, by a small margin, becoming the only Republican to hold that office in the county's history. He was elected to the Kentucky Court of Appeals, then the state's highest court, in 1900 and was re-elected in 1908. Among his important decisions were legalizing parimutuel betting, designating counties as the voting unit in local option prohibition votes, and upholding the Day Law that mandated racial segregation in the state's public schools. In 1911, O'Rear ran for governor, but his progressive platform alienated his party's more conservative wing, and he lost the election to Democrat James B. McCreary. Shortly after the election, he resigned from the Court of Appeals and returned to private practice.

O'Rear became wealthy as a chief counsel in Kentucky for the Consolidation Coal Co. and augmented his wealth through investments in real estate. In the 1920s, he helped Mary Carson Breckinridge legally organize the Frontier Nursing Service. He became more conservative later in life, opposing integration of the graduate school at the University of Kentucky and Democratic Gov. Bert T. Combs' attempt to revise the state constitution. He continued to practice law into his nineties, becoming one of the oldest active lawyers in the U.S. He died September 12, 1961, at 98. The combined lives of O'Rear and his father spanned the administrations of every U.S. president from George Washington to John F. Kennedy.

== Early life and family ==
Edward Clay O'Rear was born February 2, 1863, on his parents' farm in Camargo, Kentucky. He was the fourteenth of fifteen children of Daniel O'Rear and was born when his father was 68 years old. His mother, Sibba (Mynheir) O'Rear, was his father's second wife. When O'Rear was seven years old, his father died, and his mother moved the family – destitute in the aftermath of the Civil War – to the county seat of Mount Sterling. To help support his family, he began work as a printer's devil at The Sentinel and Democrat, a county newspaper, at age nine. He later worked for The Outlook in Owingsville and The Sentinel in Flemingsburg before taking a job as editor of the Mountain Scorcher, a newspaper in West Liberty, at age seventeen. Colonel John T. Hazelrigg, the publisher of the Mountain Scorcher, was also an accomplished lawyer, and in his spare time, O'Rear read law with him. He was later appointed deputy circuit court clerk.

On March 16, 1882, O'Rear was admitted to the bar in Morgan County. Candidates were legally required to be twenty-one before admission, and the Kentucky General Assembly had to grant O'Rear – then only nineteen – a special exemption. He began practice in West Liberty.

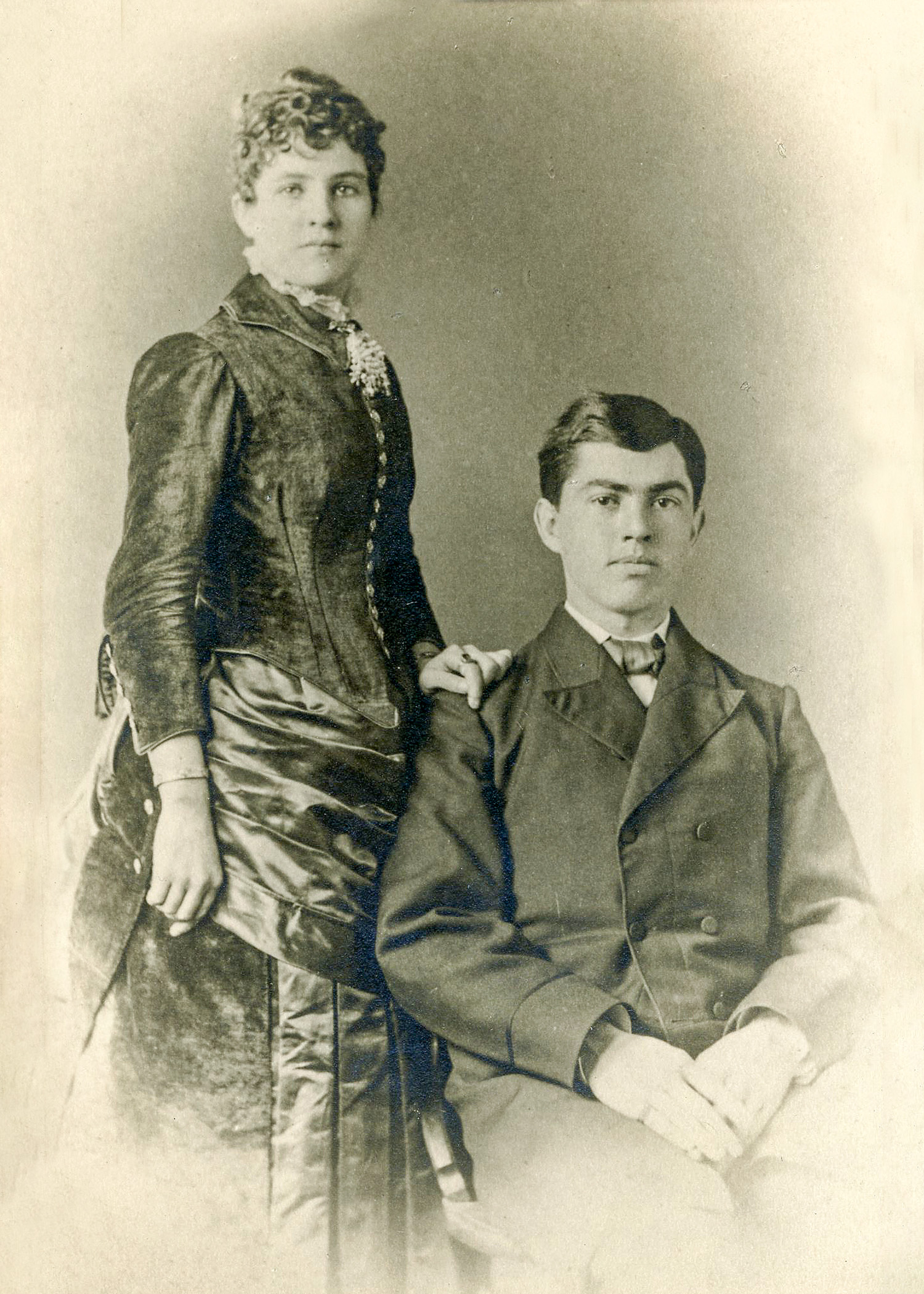
Virginia Lee Hazelrigg O'Rear and her husband Edward Clay O'Rear in 1882

On November 29, 1882, he married Virginia "Jennie" Lee Hazelrigg (9 August 1963 - 20 November 1944), daughter of his law tutor. The couple had six children, five lived to adulthood – Prentice O'Rear (1884–1965), John Thomas Hazelrigg O'Rear (1885–1972), James Bigstaff O'Rear (1892–1975), Helen O'Rear Scruggs (1893–1973), Hazel O'Rear Bradley (1895–1976), and Virginia (1903 - 1906). O'Rear was a member of the Knights Templar. The O'Rears were also members of the Methodist Episcopal Church, and O'Rear served on the church's board of education at the 1898 general conference. Later, he was named chairman of a five-man committee to issue an opinion regarding the church's ownership of Vanderbilt University. The committee found that the university belonged to the church.

== Political career ==
O'Rear returned to Mount Sterling in 1886. In 1888, he challenged incumbent Democratic Congressman William P. Taulbee to represent the 10th district in the House of Representatives, but lost in the general election. He later supervised the collection of data in the district for the 1890 census.

In 1894, O'Rear was elected county judge of Montgomery County by 145 votes, becoming the only Republican to hold that office in the history of the heavily Democratic county. During his four-year term, a Pineville real estate mogul hired him to abstract the titles to numerous acres of land in the Cumberland and Kentucky river valleys, an assignment that allowed him to travel the area and gain the confidence of wealthy investors in the eastern part of the state.

In November 1900, O'Rear was elected to represent the 7th district on the Kentucky Court of Appeals, then the state's court of last resort. He was re-elected in November 1908 and rose to become the court's chief justice. Among his notable judgments were an opinion upholding the Cammack Act of 1906 which designated counties as the voting unit in local option elections on prohibition and a 1909 decision that legalized parimutuel betting in Kentucky, an important development for the state's horse racing industry. The most notable case to come before O'Rear, however, was Berea College v. Kentucky, wherein he voted with the court's majority to uphold the Day Law that mandated segregation in the state's public schools. The decision was overturned by the U.S. Supreme Court in 1954.

=== 1911 campaign for governor ===
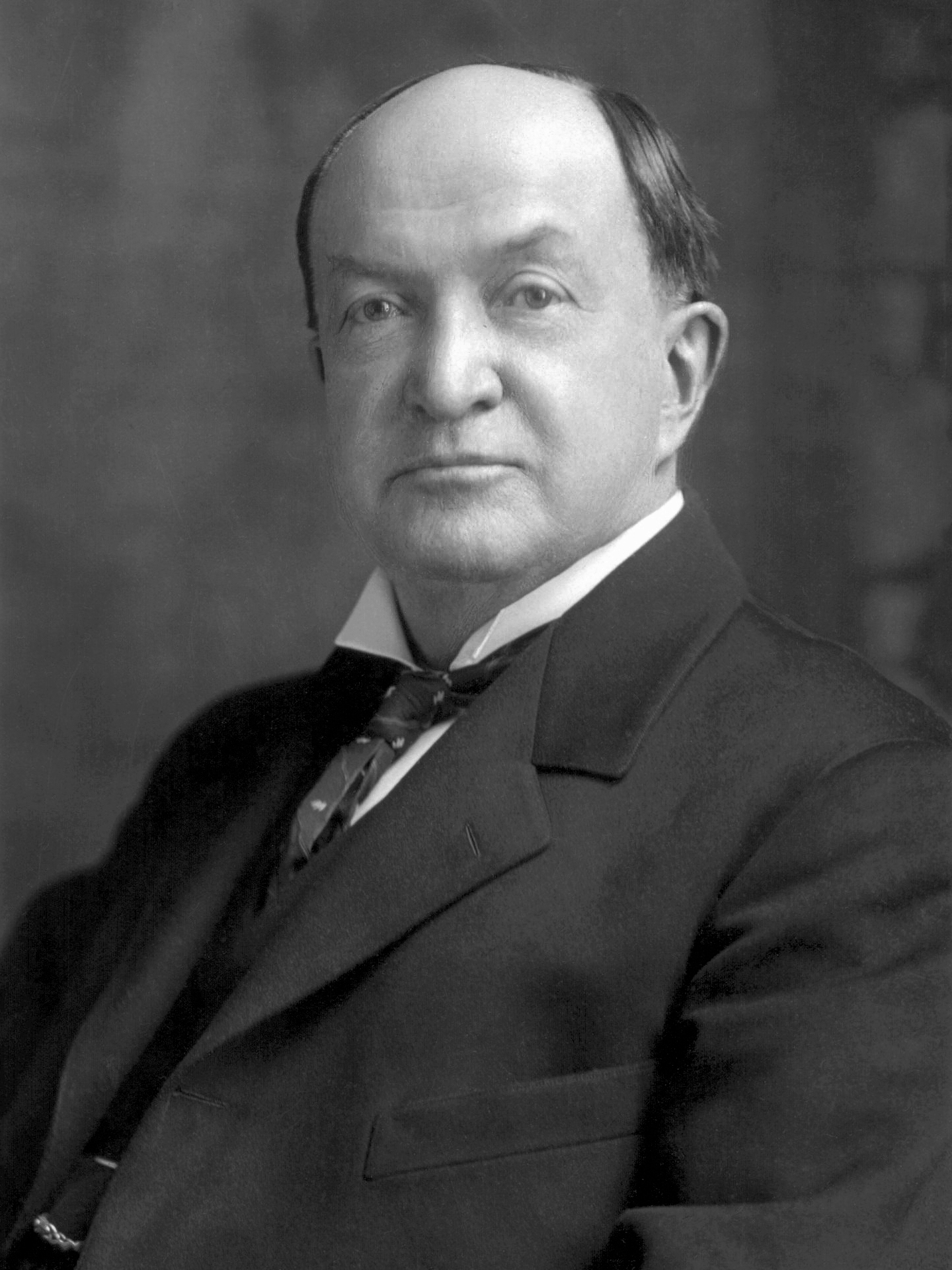
James B. McCreary defeated O'Rear in the gubernatorial election of 1911.

O'Rear was chosen as the Republican nominee for governor at the party's 1911 nominating convention, soundly defeating sitting Lieutenant Governor William Hopkinson Cox and candidate E. T. Franks. O'Rear and the convention adopted a progressive platform, including support for allowing initiatives and referendumss, women's suffrage, highway improvements, stronger labor laws, a non-partisan judiciary, creation of a public utilities commission, and direct election of U.S. senators. He also expressed sympathy for Black Patch tobacco farmers in their disputes with the American Tobacco Company, in contrast to sitting Republican Governor Augustus E. Willson, who had deployed the state militia to quell violence perpetrated by The Night Riders, a violent subset of the discontent farmers. Consequently, the more conservative wing of his party, including Willson and Senator-elect William O'Connell Bradley, gave him lukewarm support, at best. His decision in Berea College v. Kentucky also cost him support among African-American voters, who usually voted Republican in large numbers.

The Democrats, who nominated former Governor and U.S. Senator James B. McCreary, were similarly divided by factionalism stemming from McCreary's Roman Catholicism and support for prohibition. For all the divisions within their own parties, however, there were very few differences between O'Rear and McCreary. Both supported prohibition and both advocated progressive, populist reforms. This lack of political differences gave rise to partisan and personal attacks. O'Rear emphasized the need to cleanse the state of Democratic rule which had, recent gains notwithstanding, dominated the state for decades. McCreary responded by citing Republicans' alleged record of "assassination, bloodshed, and disregard of law", references to Willson's suppression of the Night Riders, Bradley's contentious election as senator, and the assassination of Democratic Governor William Goebel, allegedly perpetrated by Republicans, including Caleb Powers, who had just been elected to Congress after being pardoned by Willson. On a personal level, O'Rear charged that McCreary would be a pawn of Democratic political boss J. C. W. Beckham, while McCreary criticized O'Rear for not resigning his position on the Court of Appeals – and continuing to accept his salary – while campaigning for governor. The support of wealthy entrepreneur John C. C. Mayo ensured that McCreary had a much better funded campaign, allowing him to utilize traditional campaign methods such as political barbecues as well as new ones such as motion pictures and travel by automobile. McCreary won the election by a vote of 226,771 to 195,436.

== Post-political life ==
After the election, O'Rear tendered his resignation from the Court of Appeals and returned to private practice in Frankfort, Kentucky. He continued his support of progressive reforms, campaigning for Teddy Roosevelt's "Bull Moose" ticket in the 1912 presidential election. In the gubernatorial election of 1915, he joined with Beckham in a bi-partisan speaking tour of the state, urging the election of candidates who favored prohibition. O'Rear claimed that 90% of the state's murders could be connected to the sale or use of alcohol and cautioned that "free use of alcohol" compromised elections because an intoxicated voter was more willing to sell his vote. In 1916 as part of the coordinated efforts of the Kentucky Equal Rights Association, Jennie Hazelrigg O'Rear, led the suffrage plank committee for the Republican Party. Her committee consisted of two Kentucky First Ladies and the daughter of a governor: Katherine Waddle (Mrs. Edwin P.) Morrow, Mary Ekin (Mrs. Augustus E.) Willson, and Christine Bradley (Mrs. John Glover) South.

O'Rear established a lucrative practice as chief counsel in Kentucky for the Consolidation Coal Co. He aided the company in developing the coal and timber resources of Eastern Kentucky, creating jobs for the residents of that region and hefty profits for himself and his client. He invested his profits in real estate in Central Kentucky, eventually acquiring approximately 1,800 acres (7.3 km^{2}) of farmland in Franklin, Woodford, and Fayette counties, including Mereworth Farm and its thoroughbred stables.

In 1922, O'Rear's friend E. O. Robinson, a wealthy Cincinnati timber magnate, asked O'Rear to help him create the Robinson Mountain Fund, a charitable trust for the benefit of Robinson's native Eastern Kentucky. O'Rear was appointed lifetime chair of the trust. In November 1925, O'Rear helped draft Articles of Incorporation for Mary Carson Breckinridge's Kentucky Committee for Mothers and Babies (later known as the Frontier Nursing Service), and would later serve as the service's vice-president and director.

In the early 1930s, O'Rear divorced his first wife; later he married his secretary, Mabel Taylor.

During World War II, O'Rear was chairman of Kentucky's salvage drive to collect materials for the war effort. In 1943, he purchased the Ashley House, an estate in Woodford County, that became his home for the rest of his life.

Later in life, O'Rear became more conservative, and friends quipped that he resented "everything from the outcome of the Civil War to the advent of the twentieth century". He was serving on the University of Kentucky's board of trustees by 1949 when federal judge Hiram Church Ford held that the university's refusal to admit Lyman T. Johnson, a black man, to its graduate school was a violation of Johnson's equal protection rights under the Fourteenth Amendment because the graduate programs at Kentucky State University, which was designated for blacks, were not equal to those at the University of Kentucky. An angry O'Rear demanded that Gov. Earle C. Clements call a special legislative session to appropriate funds for a black university equal to the University of Kentucky. Clements, who did not oppose the integration of the university, reportedly almost came to blows with O'Rear over the incident.

O'Rear quipped that he attended "the University of Camargo." Both the University of Kentucky and Kentucky Wesleyan College awarded O'Rear honorary Doctor of Laws degrees. Governor A. B. "Happy" Chandler presented him the Governor's Medallion for distinguished public service in 1959. In 1960, O'Rear chaired the Committee of 1,000, a group opposed to Governor Bert T. Combs' call for a constitutional convention to update the Kentucky Constitution, which had been ratified in 1891. Chandler, champion of the more conservative wing of the state's Democratic Party, joined O'Rear in his opposition. O'Rear's arguments against revision were based on legal and constitutional reasoning, while Chandler's appeals were more emotional. In November, voters rejected the convention by 17,724 votes.

A 1953 Courier-Journal profile of O'Rear noted that, at the age of 90, he still went to work in his Frankfort law office one or two days per week and still served as chief counsel for Consolidated Coal, making him one of the oldest practicing lawyers in the United States. His obituary stated that he remained physically and mentally healthy – the use of a cane notwithstanding – until spraining his ankle in a January 1961 fall. An illness left him bedfast in June of that year, and he died at his home on September 12, 1961, at the age of 98. The combined lives of O'Rear and his father spanned the administrations of every U.S. President from George Washington to John F. Kennedy.

== Bibliography ==
- Appleton Jr., Thomas H. (January 1977). "Prohibition and Politics in Kentucky: The Gubernatorial Election of 1915". The Register of the Kentucky Historical Society. 75.
- Breckinridge, Mary (1981). Wide Neighborhoods: A Story of the Frontier Nursing Service. The University Press of Kentucky. ISBN 0813101492.
- Hardin, John A. (1997). Fifty Years of Segregation: Black Higher Education in Kentucky, 1904-1954. The University Press of Kentucky. ISBN 0813132711.
- Harrison, Lowell H.; James C. Klotter (1997). A New History of Kentucky. University Press of Kentucky. ISBN 0-8131-2008-X.
- Hughes, Paul (September 6, 1953). "Prototype of A Kentucky Gentleman – That's Edward Clay O'Rear at 90". The Courier-Journal.
- Johnson, E. Polk (1912). A History of Kentucky and Kentuckians: The Leaders and Representative Men in Commerce, Industry and Modern Activities. Vol. 2. Lewis Publishing Company.
- Klotter, James C. (1996). Kentucky: Portraits in Paradox, 1900–1950. University Press of Kentucky. ISBN 0-916968-24-3.
- Pearce, John Ed (1987). Divide and Dissent: Kentucky Politics 1930–1963. Lexington, Kentucky: The University Press of Kentucky. ISBN 0-8131-1613-9.
- Trout, Allan M. (September 13, 1961). "Judge O'Rear Dies At 98". Louisville Courier-Journal.

Party political offices
| Preceded by Augustus E. Willson | Republican nominee for Governor of Kentucky; 1911 | Succeeded by Edwin P. Morrow |
