= 1875 Kentucky gubernatorial election =

- August 2, 1875
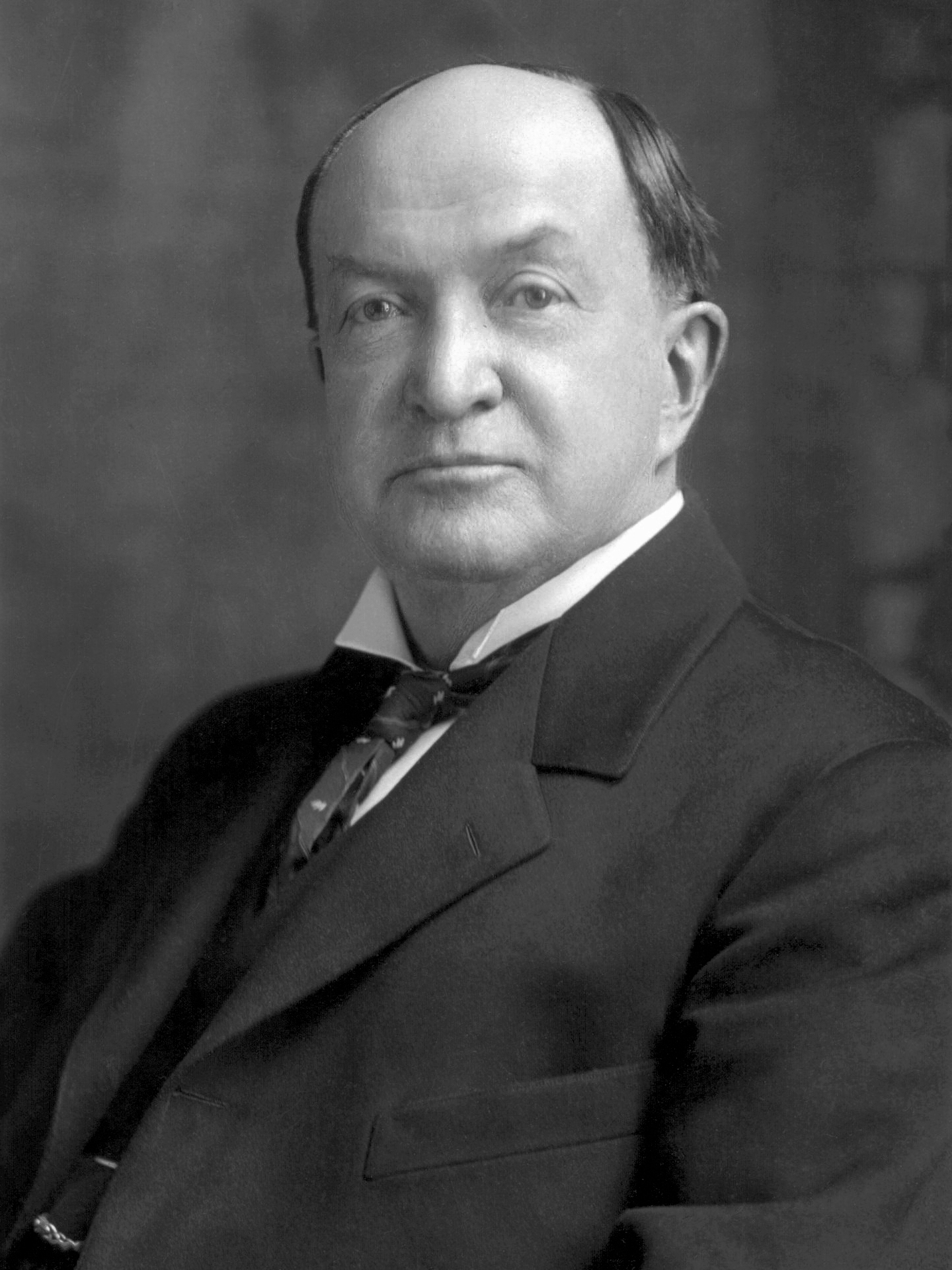

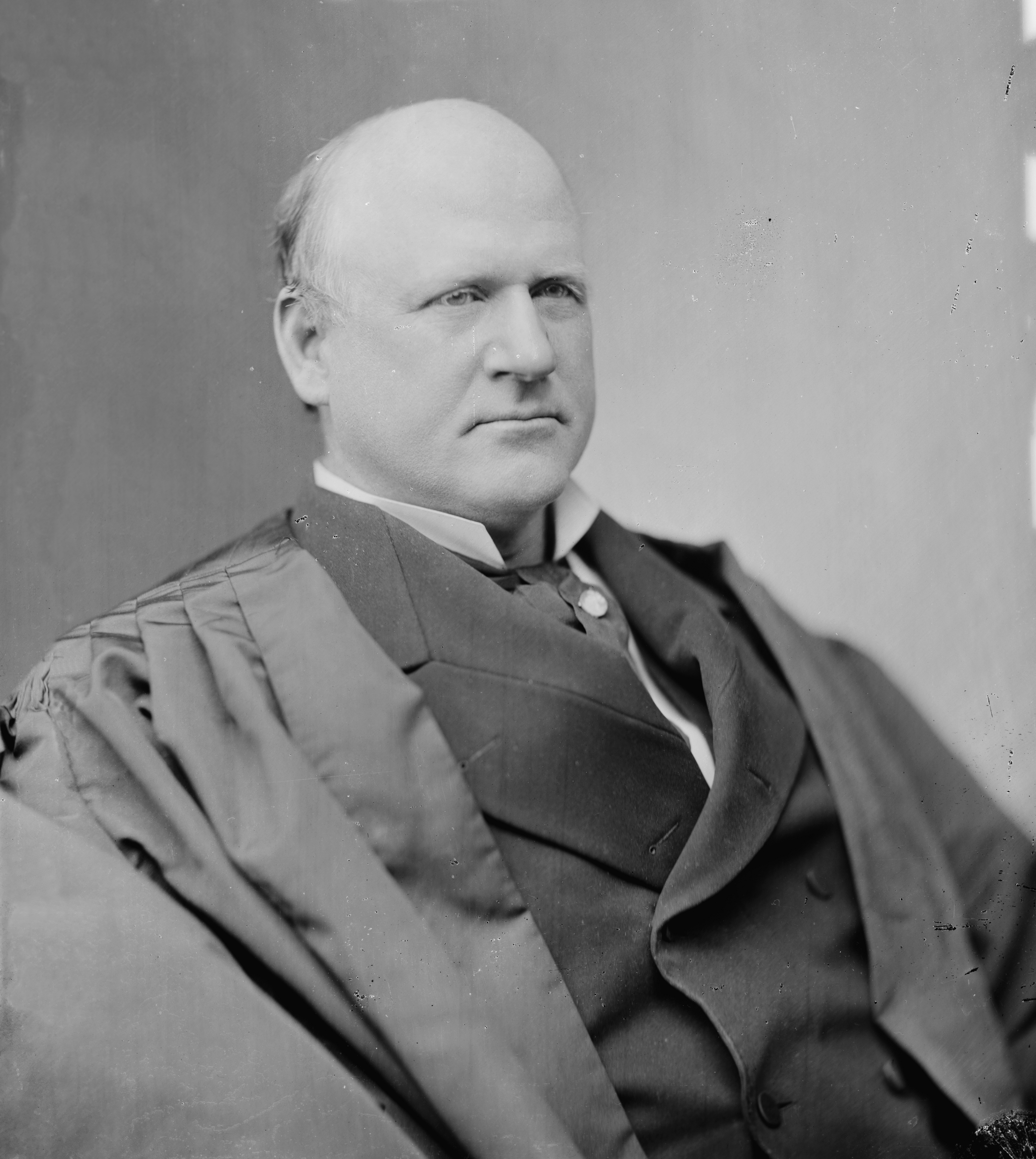
Nominee	James B. McCreary	John Marshall Harlan
Party	Democratic	Republican
Popular vote	126,976	90,795
Percentage	58.31%	41.69%
- County results McCreary: 50–60% 60–70% 70–80% 80–90% >90% Harlan: 50–60% 60–70% 70–80%
Governor before election
Preston Leslie
Democratic
Elected Governor
James B. McCreary
Democratic

The 1875 Kentucky gubernatorial election was held on August 2, 1875. Democratic nominee James B. McCreary defeated Republican nominee John Marshall Harlan with 58.31% of the vote.

== General election ==
=== Candidates ===
- James B. McCreary, Democratic
- John Marshall Harlan, Republican

=== Results ===
1875 Kentucky gubernatorial election
Party	Candidate	Votes	%	±%
Democratic	James B. McCreary	126,976	58.31%	−0.30%
Republican	John Marshall Harlan	90,795	41.69%	+0.30%
Majority		36,181	16.62%	
Turnout				
Democratic hold		Swing		
