= James B. McCreary =

Governor of Kentucky (1838–1918)

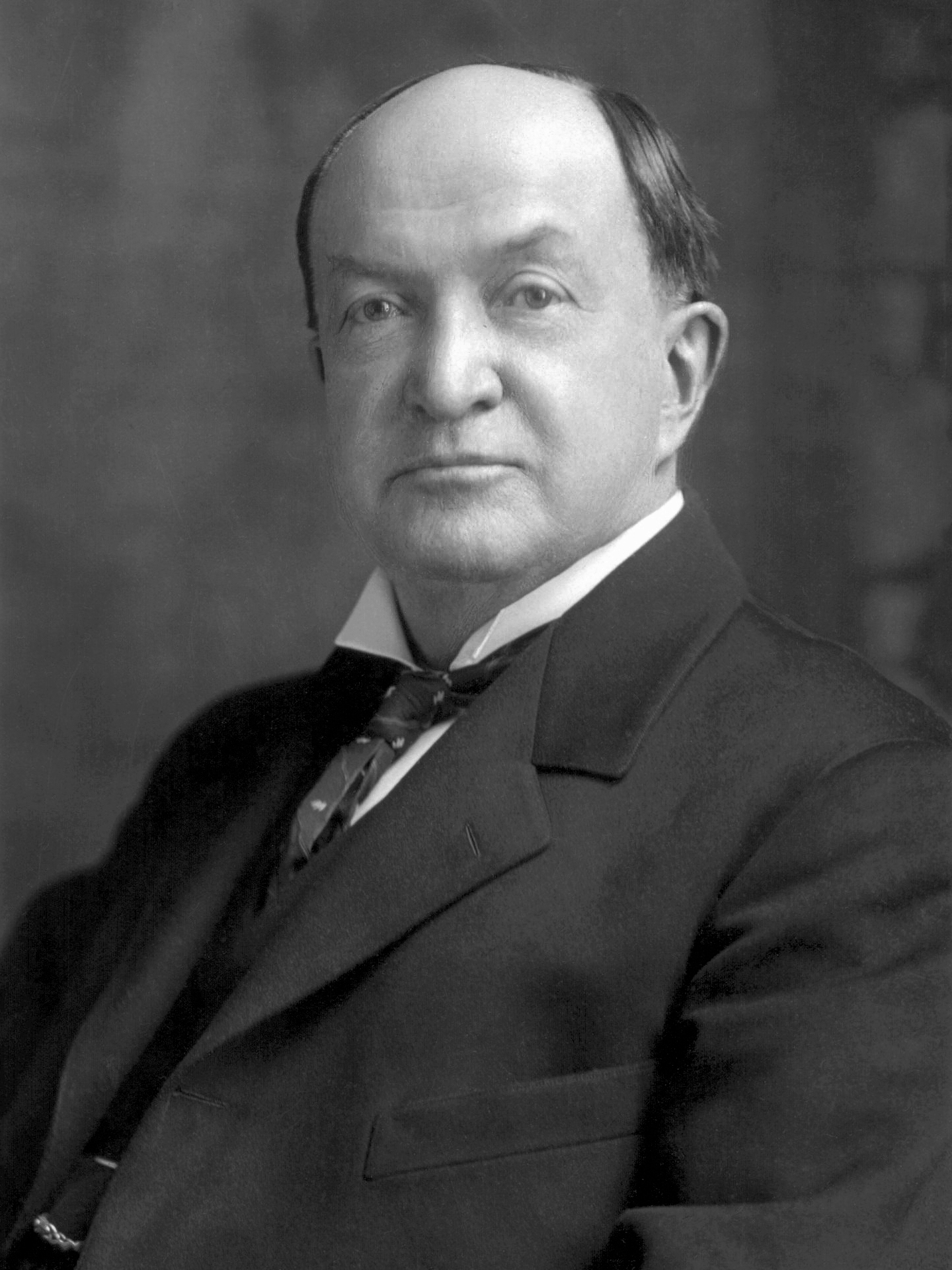
- McCreary in 1914

27th and 37th Governor of Kentucky
- In office December 12, 1911 – December 7, 1915
- Lieutenant: Edward J. McDermott
- Preceded by: Augustus E. Willson
- Succeeded by: Augustus O. Stanley
- In office August 31, 1875 – September 2, 1879
- Lieutenant: John C. Underwood
- Preceded by: Preston H. Leslie
- Succeeded by: Luke P. Blackburn

United States Senator from Kentucky
- In office March 4, 1903 – March 3, 1909
- Preceded by: William J. Deboe
- Succeeded by: William O. Bradley

Member of the U.S. House of Representatives from Kentucky's 8th district
- In office March 4, 1885 – March 3, 1897
- Preceded by: Philip B. Thompson Jr.
- Succeeded by: George M. Davison

Member of the Kentucky House of Representatives from Madison County
- In office August 2, 1869 – August 2, 1875
- Preceded by: Andrew T. Chenault
- Succeeded by: Robert E. Little

Personal details
- Born: James Bennett McCreary; July 8, 1838 Richmond, Kentucky, U.S.
- Died: October 8, 1918 (aged 80) Richmond, Kentucky, U.S.
- Resting place: Richmond Cemetery, Richmond, Kentucky
- Party: Democratic
- Spouse: Catherine Hughes
- Education: Centre College; Cumberland University
- Profession: Lawyer

Military service
- Allegiance: Confederate States of America
- Branch/service: Confederate States Army
- Rank: Lieutenant Colonel
- Unit: 11th Kentucky Cavalry
- Battles/wars: American Civil War

James Bennett McCreary (July 8, 1838 – October 8, 1918) was an American lawyer and politician from Kentucky. He was a member of the Democratic Party; identified with its reform wing.

He represented the state in both houses of the U.S. Congress and served as its 27th and 37th governor. Shortly after graduating from law school, he was commissioned as the only major in the 11th Kentucky Cavalry, serving under Confederate Brigadier General John Hunt Morgan during the American Civil War. He returned to his legal practice after the war. In 1869, he was elected to the Kentucky House of Representatives where he served until 1875; he was twice chosen Speaker of the House. At their 1875 nominating convention, state Democrats chose McCreary as their nominee for governor, and he won an easy victory over Republican John Marshall Harlan. With the state still feeling the effects of the Panic of 1873, most of McCreary's actions as governor were aimed at easing the plight of the state's poor farmers.

In 1884, McCreary was elected to the first of six consecutive terms in the U.S. House of Representatives. As a legislator, he was an advocate of free silver and a champion of the state's agricultural interests. After two failed bids for election to the Senate, McCreary secured the support of Governor J. C. W. Beckham, and in 1902, the General Assembly elected him to the Senate. He served one largely undistinguished term, and Beckham then successfully challenged him for his Senate seat in 1908. The divide between McCreary and Beckham was short-lived, however, and Beckham supported McCreary's election to a second term as governor in 1911.

Campaigning on a platform of progressive reforms, McCreary defeated Republican Edward C. O'Rear in the general election. During this second term, he became the first inhabitant of the state's second (and current) governor's mansion; he is also the only governor to have inhabited both the old and new mansions. During his second term, he presided over the passage of various labor laws and succeeded in convincing the legislature to make women eligible to vote in school board elections, to mandate direct primary elections, to create a state public utilities commission, and to allow the state's counties to hold local option elections to decide whether or not to adopt prohibition. He also realized substantial increases in education spending and won passage of reforms such as a mandatory school attendance law, but was unable to secure passage of laws restricting lobbying in the legislative chambers and providing for a workers' compensation program. McCreary was one of five commissioners charged with overseeing construction of the new governor's mansion and exerted considerable influence on the construction plans. His term expired in 1915, and he died three years later. McCreary County was formed during McCreary's second term in office and was named in his honor.

== Early life ==
James Bennett McCreary was born in Richmond, Kentucky, on July 8, 1838. He was the son of Edmund R. and Sabrina (Bennett) McCreary. He obtained his early education in the region's common schools, then matriculated to Centre College in Danville, Kentucky, where he earned a bachelor's degree in 1857. Immediately thereafter, he enrolled at Cumberland University in Lebanon, Tennessee, to study law. In 1859, he earned a Bachelor of Laws from Cumberland and was valedictorian of his class of forty-seven students; he was admitted to the bar and commenced practice at Richmond.

Shortly after the Battle of Richmond on August 29, 1862, David Waller Chenault, a Confederate sympathizer from Madison County, came to Richmond to raise a Confederate regiment. On September 10, 1862, Chenault was commissioned as a colonel and given command of the regiment, dubbed the 11th Kentucky Cavalry. McCreary joined the regiment and was commissioned as a major, the only one in the unit. The 11th Kentucky Cavalry was pressed into immediate service, conducting reconnaissance and fighting bushwhackers. Just three months after its muster, they helped the Confederate Army secure a victory at the Battle of Hartsville. In 1863, the unit joined John Hunt Morgan for his raid into Ohio. Colonel Chenault was killed as the Confederates tried to capture the Green River Bridge at the July 4, 1863, Battle of Tebbs Bend. McCreary assumed command of the unit after Chenault's death. Following the battle, he was promoted to the rank of lieutenant colonel on the recommendation of John C. Breckinridge.

Most of the 11th Kentucky Cavalry was captured by Union forces at the Battle of Buffington Island on July 17, 1863. Approximately two hundred men, commanded by McCreary, mounted a charge and escaped their captors, but they were surrounded the next day and surrendered. McCreary was taken to Ninth Street Prison in Cincinnati, Ohio, but was later transferred to Fort Delaware and eventually to Morris Island, South Carolina, where he remained a prisoner through July and most of August 1863. In late August, he was released as part of a prisoner exchange and taken to Richmond, Virginia. He was granted a thirty-day furlough before being put in command of a battalion of Kentucky and South Carolina troops. He commanded this unit, primarily on scouting missions, until the end of the war.

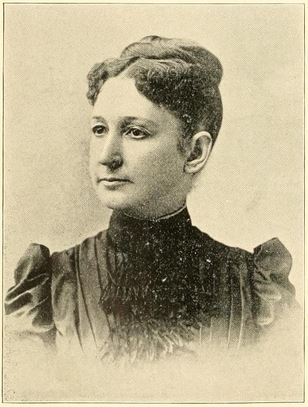
Catherine Hughes McCreary

Following the war, McCreary resumed his legal practice. On June 12, 1867, McCreary married Catherine "Kate" Hughes (April 15, 1844 – October 22, 1908), the only daughter of Julia Ann Smith and Thomas Hughes, a wealthy Fayette County farmer. The couple had one son.

== Early political career ==
McCreary was nominated to serve as a presidential elector for the ticket of Democrat Horatio Seymour in 1868; though he declined to serve, he attended the national convention as a delegate. His political career began in earnest in 1869 when he was elected to the Kentucky House of Representatives.

In 1871, McCreary was re-elected to the state House without opposition. In the upcoming legislative session, the major question was expected to be the Cincinnati Southern Railway's request for authorization to build a track connecting Cincinnati, Ohio, with either Knoxville or Chattanooga, Tennessee, through Central Kentucky. The action was opposed by the Louisville and Nashville Railroad, a bitter rival of the Cincinnati line. Appeals to the General Assembly to oppose the bill on grounds that an out-of-state corporation should not be granted a charter in the state were successful in 1869 and 1870, and an attempt by the federal Congress to grant the charter was defeated by states' rights legislators there. Moreover, newly elected governor Preston Leslie had opposed a bill granting Cincinnati Southern's request when he was in the state Senate in 1869. In the lead-up to the 1871 session, frustrated Central Kentuckians threatened to defect from the Democratic Party in future elections if the bill were not passed in the session. Supporters of Cincinnati Southern won a victory when McCreary, a staunch supporter of the bill to grant the line's request, was elected Speaker of the House. After approval of a series of amendments designed to give Kentucky courts some jurisdiction in cases involving the line and the Kentucky General Assembly some measure of control over the line's activities, the bill passed the House by a vote of 59–38. The vote in the Senate resulted in a 19–19 tie; President Pro Tem John G. Carlisle—a native of Covington, through which the proposed line would pass—cast the deciding vote in favor of approving Cincinnati Southern's request. With the will of the people clearly expressed through the legislature, Governor Leslie did not employ his gubernatorial veto. McCreary was again returned to the House without opposition in 1873 and was again chosen Speaker of the House during his term.

== First term as governor ==
In 1875, McCreary was one of four men, all former Confederate soldiers, who sought the Democratic gubernatorial nomination—the others being John Stuart Williams, J. Stoddard Johnson, and George B. Hodge. Williams was considered the favorite for the nomination at the outset of the Democratic nominating convention, despite attacks on his character by newspapers in the western part of the state. However, McCreary defeated Williams on the fourth ballot.

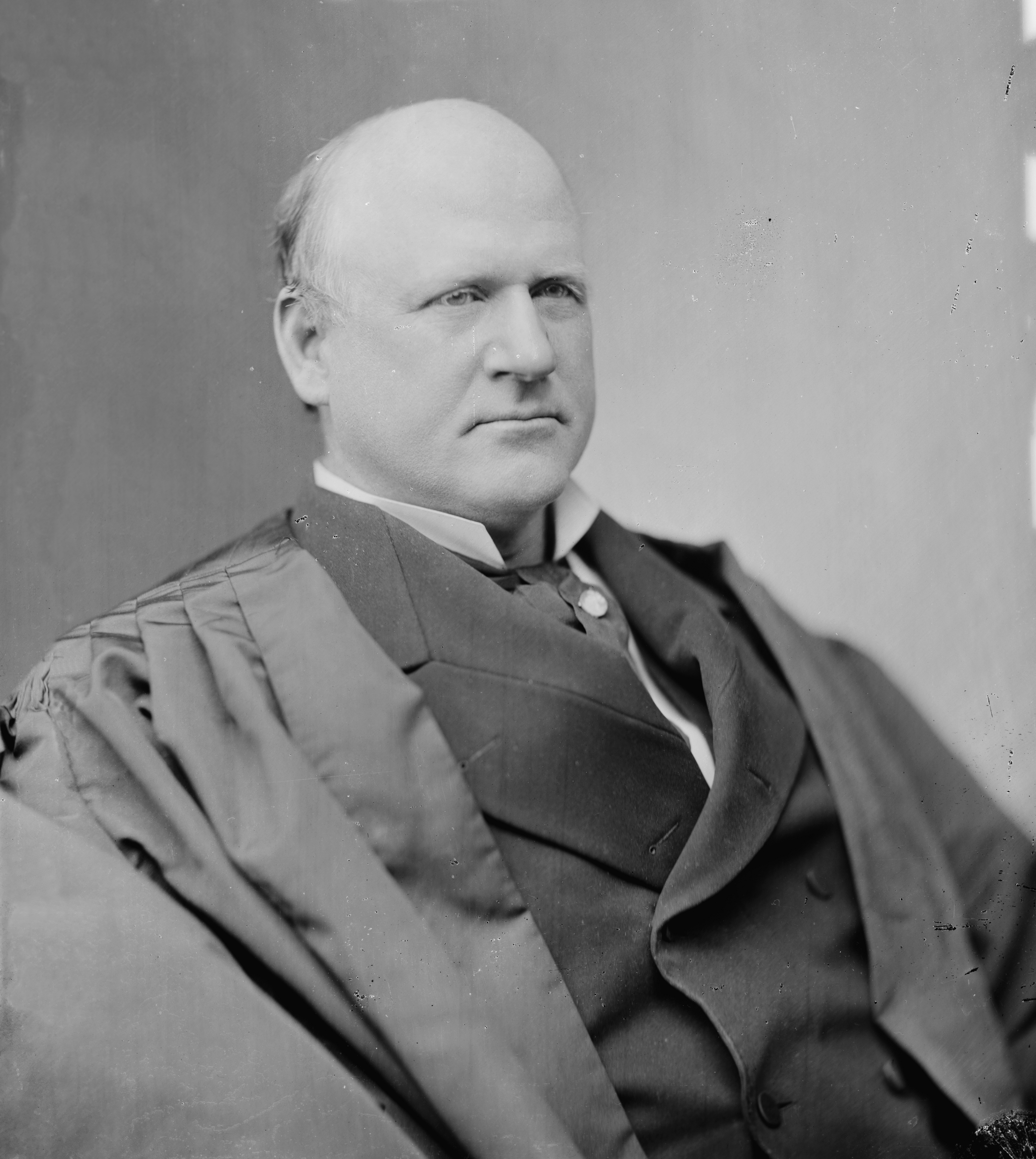
John Marshall Harlan, McCreary's opponent in the 1875 gubernatorial contest

The Republicans nominated John Marshall Harlan, who had served in the Union Army. In joint debates across the state, McCreary stressed what many Kentuckians felt were abuses of power by Republican President Ulysses S. Grant during the Reconstruction Era. Harlan countered by faulting the state's Democratic politicians for continuing to dwell on war issues almost a decade after the war's end. He also attacked what he perceived as Democratic financial extravagance and the high number of pardons granted by sitting Democratic governor Preston Leslie. Harlan claimed these as evidence of widespread corruption in the Democratic Party. McCreary received solid support from the state's newspapers, nearly all of which had Democratic sympathies. Despite a late infusion of cash and stump speakers in favor of his opponent, McCreary won the general election by a vote of 130,026 to 94,236.

At the time of McCreary's election, his wife Kate was the youngest first lady in the Commonwealth's history. Due to the near completion of an annex to the state capitol building by the time of McCreary's inauguration, he was able to move the official governor's office out of the governor's mansion, freeing his family from the intrusion of public business into their private quarters. McCreary's receipt of the executive journal and Great Seal of the Commonwealth from outgoing Governor Leslie in the mansion's office is believed to be the last official act performed by a governor there.

In the wake of the Panic of 1873, the electorate was primarily concerned with economic issues. In his first address to the General Assembly, McCreary focused on economic issues to the near exclusion of providing any leadership or direction in the area of government reforms. (In later years, McCreary's unwillingness to take a definite stand on key issues of reform would earn him the nicknames "Bothsides" McCreary and "Oily Jeems".) In response to McCreary's address, legislators from the rural, agrarian areas of the state proposed lowering the maximum legal interest rate from ten percent to six percent. The proposed legislation drew the ire of bankers and capitalists; it was also widely panned in the press, notably by Louisville Courier-Journal editor Henry Watterson. Ultimately, the Assembly compromised on a legal interest rate of eight percent. Another bill to lower the property tax rate from 45 to 40 cents per 100 dollars of taxable property encountered far less resistance and passed easily. Few bills passed during the session had statewide impact, despite McCreary's insistence that the legislature prefer general bills over bills of local impact. This fact, too, was widely criticized by the state's newspapers.

The issue of improving navigation along the Kentucky River was raised numerous times by Representative James Blue during the 1876 legislative session. Despite Blue's promises of manifold benefits to the state from such an investment, parsimonious legislators defeated a bill allocating funds for the improvements. The issue gained traction with some voters during the biennial legislative elections, however, which brought it back to the floor in the 1878 session. Prompted by recommendations from the Kentucky River Navigation Convention in 1877, McCreary abandoned his typical fiscal conservatism and joined the calls for improvements along the river. In response, legislators passed a largely ineffective bill providing that, if funds could be raised through special taxes in districts along the river, the state would provide the funds to maintain the improvements.

Also in the 1878 session, tax assessments for railroad property were raised to match those of other property. Agrarian interests were pleased when the legal interest rate was again lowered, now reaching the six percent they had proposed in the previous session. Non-economic reforms included the separation of Kentucky Agricultural and Mechanical College (later the University of Kentucky) from Kentucky University (later Transylvania University) and the establishment of a state board of health. Bills of local import again dominated the session, representing 90 percent of the acts and resolutions passed by the Assembly.

Along with Democrats John Stuart Williams, William Lindsay, and J. Proctor Knott, and Republican Robert Boyd, McCreary was nominated for a U.S. Senate seat in 1878. Democrats were divided by sectionalism and initially unable to unite behind one of their four candidates. After more than a week of caucusing among Democratic legislators, the nominations of McCreary, Knott, and Lindsay were withdrawn, and Williams was elected over Boyd. Historian Hambleton Tapp opined that the withdrawals were likely a part of some kind of deal among legislators, although the details of the deal, if it ever existed, were not made public.

== Service in Congress ==
Following his term as governor, McCreary returned to his legal practice. In 1884, he sought election to Congress from Kentucky's Eighth District. His opponents for the Democratic nomination were Milton J. Durham and Philip B. Thompson Jr., both of whom had held the district's seat previously. McCreary bested both men, and in the general election in November, defeated Republican James Sebastian by a margin of 2,146 votes. It was the largest margin of victory by a Democrat in the Eighth District.

During his tenure, McCreary represented Kentucky's agricultural interests, introducing a bill to create the United States Department of Agriculture. A bill containing most of the same provisions as the one McCreary authored was passed later in the session. He also proposed a successful amendment to the Wilson–Gorman Tariff Act that excluded farm implements and machinery from the tariff. An advocate of free silver, he was appointed by President Benjamin Harrison to be a delegate to the International Monetary Conference held in Brussels, Belgium, in 1892. As chairman of the House Committee on Foreign Affairs, he authored a bill to establish a court that would settle disputed land claims stemming from the Gadsden Purchase and the Treaty of Guadalupe-Hidalgo. He advocated the creation of a railroad linking Canada, the United States, and Mexico. In 1890, he sponsored a bill authorizing the first Pan-American Conference and was an advocate of the Pan-American Medical Conference that met in Washington, D.C., in 1893. He authored a report declaring American hostility to European ownership of a canal connecting the Atlantic and Pacific Oceans, and sponsored legislation authorizing the U.S. president to retaliate against foreign vessels that harassed American fishing boats.

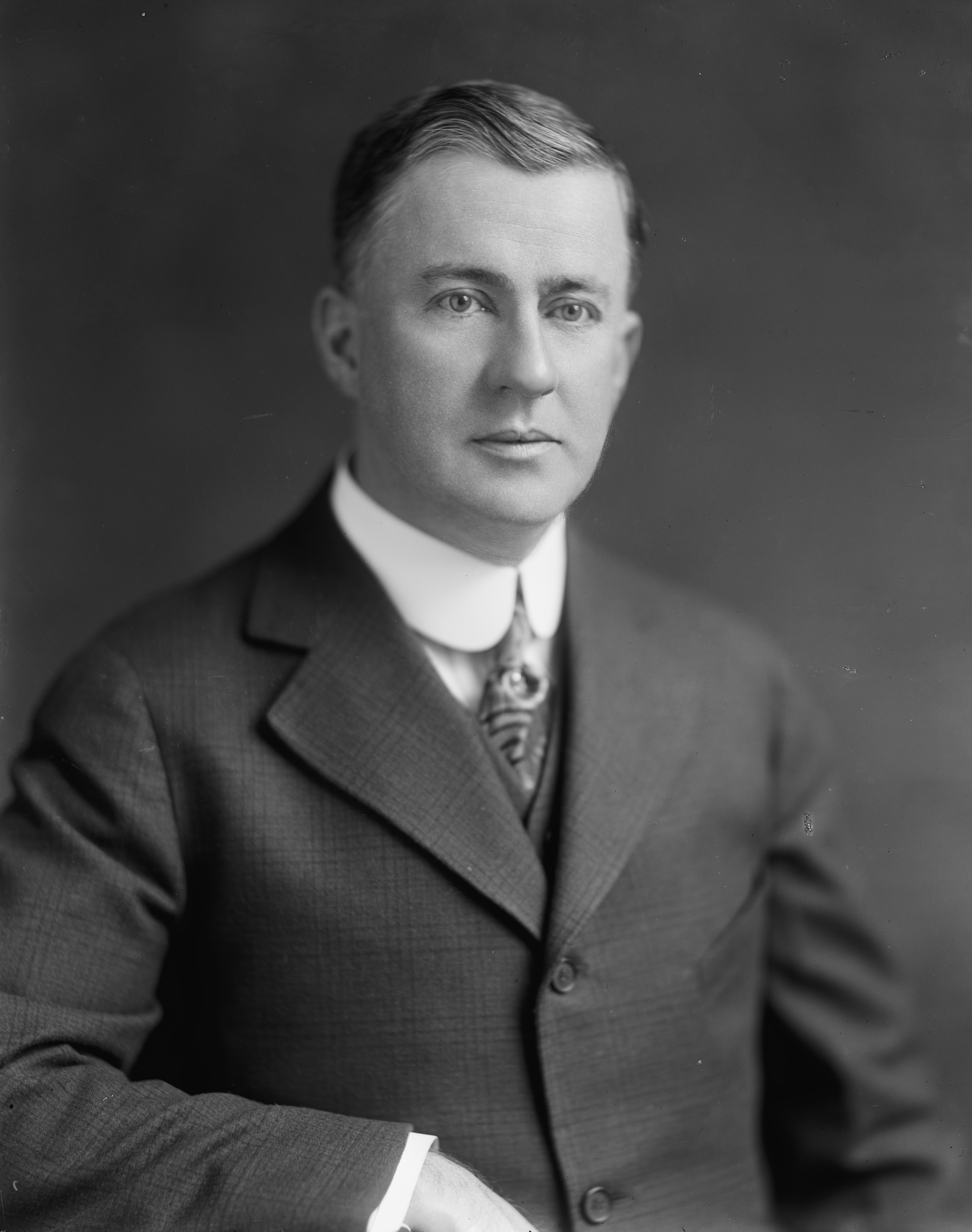
J. C. W. Beckham, McCreary's sometime ally, succeeded him in the Senate.

In 1890, McCreary's name was again placed in nomination for a U.S. Senate seat to succeed James B. Beck, who died in office. John G. Carlisle, J. Proctor Knott, William Lindsay, Laban T. Moore, and Evan E. Settle were also nominated by various factions of the Democratic Party; Republicans nominated Silas Adams. Carlisle was elected on the ninth ballot. McCreary continued his service in the House until 1896, when he was defeated in his bid for a seventh consecutive nomination for the seat. In that same year, his was among a myriad of names put forward for election to the Senate, but he never received more than 13 votes. Following these defeats, he resumed his law practice in Richmond.

McCreary campaigned for Democrat William Goebel during the controversial 1899 gubernatorial campaign. Between 1900 and 1912, he represented Kentucky at four consecutive Democratic National Conventions. Governor J. C. W. Beckham and his well-established political machine supported McCreary's nomination to the Senate in 1902. His opponent, incumbent William J. Deboe, had been elected as a compromise candidate six years earlier, becoming Kentucky's first-ever Republican senator. Deboe had done little to secure support from legislators since his election, however, and McCreary was easily elected by a vote of 95–30. Following his election to the Senate, McCreary supported Beckham's gubernatorial re-election bid in 1903. In a largely undistinguished term as a senator, he continued to advocate the free coinage of silver and tried to advance the state's agricultural interests.

McCreary's senate term was set to expire in 1908, the same year as Beckham's second term as governor. Desiring election to the Senate following his gubernatorial term, Beckham persuaded his Democratic allies to choose the party's nominees for governor and senator by a primary election held in 1906—a year before the gubernatorial election and two years before the senatorial election. This ensured that the primary would occur during his term as governor, when he still wielded significant influence within the party. McCreary now allied himself with J. C. S. Blackburn, Henry Watterson, and other Beckham opponents, and sought to defend his seat in the primary. During the primary campaign, he pointed to his record of dealing with national issues, contrasting it with Beckham's youth and inexperience at the national level. Beckham countered by citing his strong stand in favor of Prohibition, as opposed to McCreary's more moderate position, and by touting his support of a primary election instead of a nominating convention, which he said gave the voters a choice in who would represent them in the Senate. Ultimately, Beckham prevailed in the primary by an 11,000-vote margin, rendering McCreary a lame duck with two years still left in his term.

== Second term as governor and death ==
Despite Beckham's move to unseat McCreary in the Senate, the two were once again allies by 1911, when Beckham supported the aging McCreary for the party's gubernatorial nomination. It is unclear whether McCreary sought the reconciliation in order to secure the gubernatorial nomination or Beckham made amends with McCreary because he thought he could control McCreary's actions as governor. In the Democratic primary, McCreary defeated William Adams by a majority of 25,000 votes.

Republicans nominated Judge Edward C. O'Rear to oppose McCreary. There were few differences between the two men's stands on the issues. Both supported progressive reforms such as the direct election of senators, a non-partisan judiciary, and the creation of a public utilities commission. McCreary also changed his stance on the liquor question, now agreeing with Beckham's prohibitionist position; this also matched the Republican position. O'Rear claimed that Democrats should have already enacted the reforms their party platform advocated, but his only ready line of attack against McCreary himself was that he would be a pawn of Beckham and his allies.

McCreary pointed out that O'Rear had been nominated at a party nominating convention instead of winning a primary, though O'Rear claimed to support primary elections. He also criticized O'Rear for continuing to receive his salary as a judge while running for governor. McCreary cited what he called the Republicans' record of "assassination, bloodshed, and disregard of law", an allusion to the assassination of William Goebel in the aftermath of the 1899 gubernatorial contest. Caleb Powers, convicted three times of being an accessory to Goebel's murder, had been pardoned by Republican governor Augustus Willson and had recently been elected to Congress. He further attacked the tariff policies of Republican President William H. Taft. In the general election, McCreary won a decisive victory, garnering 226,771 votes to O'Rear's 195,435. Several other minor party candidates also received votes, including Socialist candidate Walter Lanfersiek, who claimed 8,718 votes (2 percent of the total).

As the niece of the widowed Governor, Elise Bennett Smith often served as the hostess of gatherings at the old executive mansion at Frankfort.

=== Construction of the new governor's mansion ===
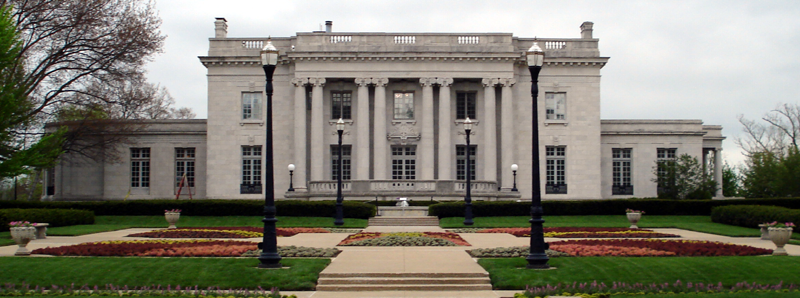
The current Kentucky Governor's Mansion was constructed during McCreary's second gubernatorial term.

One of McCreary's first acts as governor was signing a bill appropriating $75,000 for the construction of a new governor's mansion. The legislature appointed a commission of five, including McCreary, to oversee the mansion's construction. The governor exercised a good deal of influence over the process, including the replacement of a conservatory with a ballroom in the construction plan and the selection of a contractor from his hometown of Richmond as assistant superintendent of construction. Changing societal trends also affected construction. A hastily constructed stable to house horse-drawn carriages was soon abandoned in favor of a garage for automobiles.

The mansion was completed in 1914. His son's daughter, Harriet Newberry McCreary, served as the mansion's first official hostess during her summer vacations from her studies at Wellesley College. Sometimes McCreary's housekeeper, Jennie Shaw, served as hostess. McCreary authorized the state to sell the old mansion at auction, but the final bid of $13,600 was rejected as unfair by the mansion commission.

=== Progressive reforms ===
Among the progressive reforms advocated by McCreary and passed in the 1912 legislative session were making women eligible to vote in school board elections, mandating direct primary elections, and allowing the state's counties to hold local option elections to decide whether or not to adopt prohibition. McCreary appointed a tax commission to study the revenue system, and the Board of Assessments and Valuation made a more realistic appraisal of corporate property. McCreary created executive departments to oversee state banking and highways, and a bipartisan vote in the General Assembly established the Kentucky Public Service Commission. Near the close of the session, McCreary County was created and named in the governor's honor. It was the last of Kentucky's 120 counties to be constituted.

McCreary was not as successful in securing reforms during the 1914 legislative session. He advocated a comprehensive workmen's compensation law, but the law that was passed in the 1914 General Assembly was later declared unconstitutional. He also recommended a requirement for full disclosure of campaign contributions and expenditures, but the majority of legislators in the House of Representatives voted to send it back to the Suffrage and Elections Committee, from whence it was never recalled. Although they did not pass a law regulating lobbying at the capitol—a law that McCreary supported—legislators showed responsiveness to McCreary's desire for this reform by putting stricter regulations on who could be in the legislative chambers while the legislature was in session. Some reforms were made in the area of education. The school year was lengthened, school attendance for children was mandated, and the legislature created a Text Book Commission to assist local school boards in adopting textbooks. Public schools expenditures were increased by 25 percent.

Part of the reason for the inefficacy of the 1914 session was that McCreary was engaged in a three-way primary race for the Democratic nomination to the U.S. Senate. The other major candidates were former Governor Beckham and Augustus Owsley Stanley; a fourth candidate, David H. Smith, withdrew early from the race. McCreary ran a mostly positive campaign, touting his own accomplishments and speaking cordially about his opponents. Beckham and Stanley, however, were bitter political and personal enemies, and the campaign reflected their animosity. Without the support of Beckham's political machine that had helped him in the gubernatorial contest, McCreary never had a realistic chance to win the nomination. Beckham secured the nomination with 72,677 votes to Stanley's 65,871 and McCreary's 20,257.

Following the expiration of his term as governor, McCreary continued to practice as a private attorney until his death on October 8, 1918. He was buried in Richmond Cemetery in Richmond, Kentucky.

Party political offices
Preceded by Preston Leslie	Democratic nominee for Governor of Kentucky; 1875	Succeeded by Luke P. Blackburn
Preceded by Samuel Wilber Hager	Democratic nominee for Governor of Kentucky; 1911	Succeeded by Augustus Owsley Stanley
Political offices
Preceded by Preston H. Leslie	Governor of Kentucky; 1875–1879	Succeeded by Luke P. Blackburn
Preceded by Augustus E. Willson	Governor of Kentucky; 1911–1915	Succeeded by Augustus O. Stanley
U.S. House of Representatives
Preceded by Philip B. Thompson Jr.	United States Representative (District 8) from Kentucky; 1885–1897	Succeeded by George M. Davison
U.S. Senate
Preceded by William J. Deboe	U.S. senator (Class 3) from Kentucky; 1903–1909; Served alongside: Joseph C. S. Blackburn, Thomas H. Paynter	Succeeded by William O. Bradley
