= George G. Gilbert =

American politician (1849–1909)

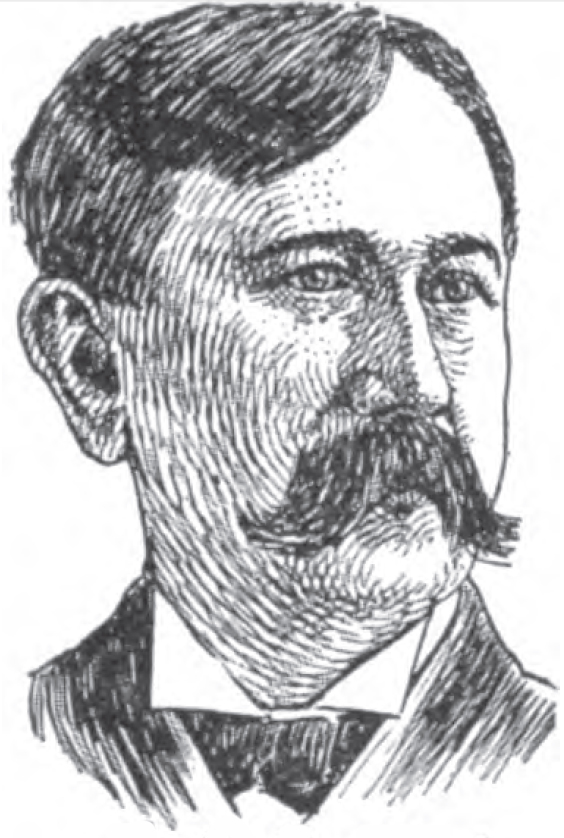

Member of the U.S. House of Representatives from Kentucky's 8th district
- In office March 4, 1899 – March 3, 1907
- Preceded by: George M. Davison
- Succeeded by: Harvey Helm

Member of the Kentucky Senate from the 14th district
- In office August 3, 1885 – August 5, 1889
- Preceded by: J. D. Elliott
- Succeeded by: W. H. Anderson

Personal details
- Born: December 24, 1849 Taylorsville, Kentucky, U.S.
- Died: November 9, 1909 (aged 59) Louisville, Kentucky, U.S.
- Resting place: Cave Hill Cemetery; Louisville, Kentucky, U.S.
- Party: Democratic
- Children: Ralph Waldo Emerson Gilbert
- Education: University of Louisville School of Law
- Profession: Lawyer

George Gilmore Gilbert (December 24, 1849 – November 9, 1909) was a U.S. representative from Kentucky, father of Ralph Waldo Emerson Gilbert.

Born in Taylorsville, Kentucky, Gilbert attended the common schools, Cecilian College in 1868 and 1869, and Lyndland Institute in Kentucky. He taught school. He was graduated from the law department of the University of Louisville in 1873. He was admitted to the bar and began practice in Taylorsville, Kentucky, in 1874. He served as prosecuting attorney of Spencer County 1876–1880. He served as member of the State senate 1885–1889. He served as delegate to the 1896 Democratic National Convention.

Gilbert was elected as a Democrat to the Fifty-sixth and to the three succeeding Congresses (March 4, 1899 – March 3, 1907). He was not a candidate for reelection. He resumed the practice of law. He died in Louisville, Kentucky, November 9, 1909. He was interred in Cave Hill Cemetery.

U.S. House of Representatives
Preceded by George M. Davison	Member of the U.S. House of Representatives from Kentucky's 8th congressional district 1899 – 1907	Succeeded by Harvey Helm
