= Cox Building (Maysville, Kentucky) =

- The Cox Building
- U.S. National Register of Historic Places
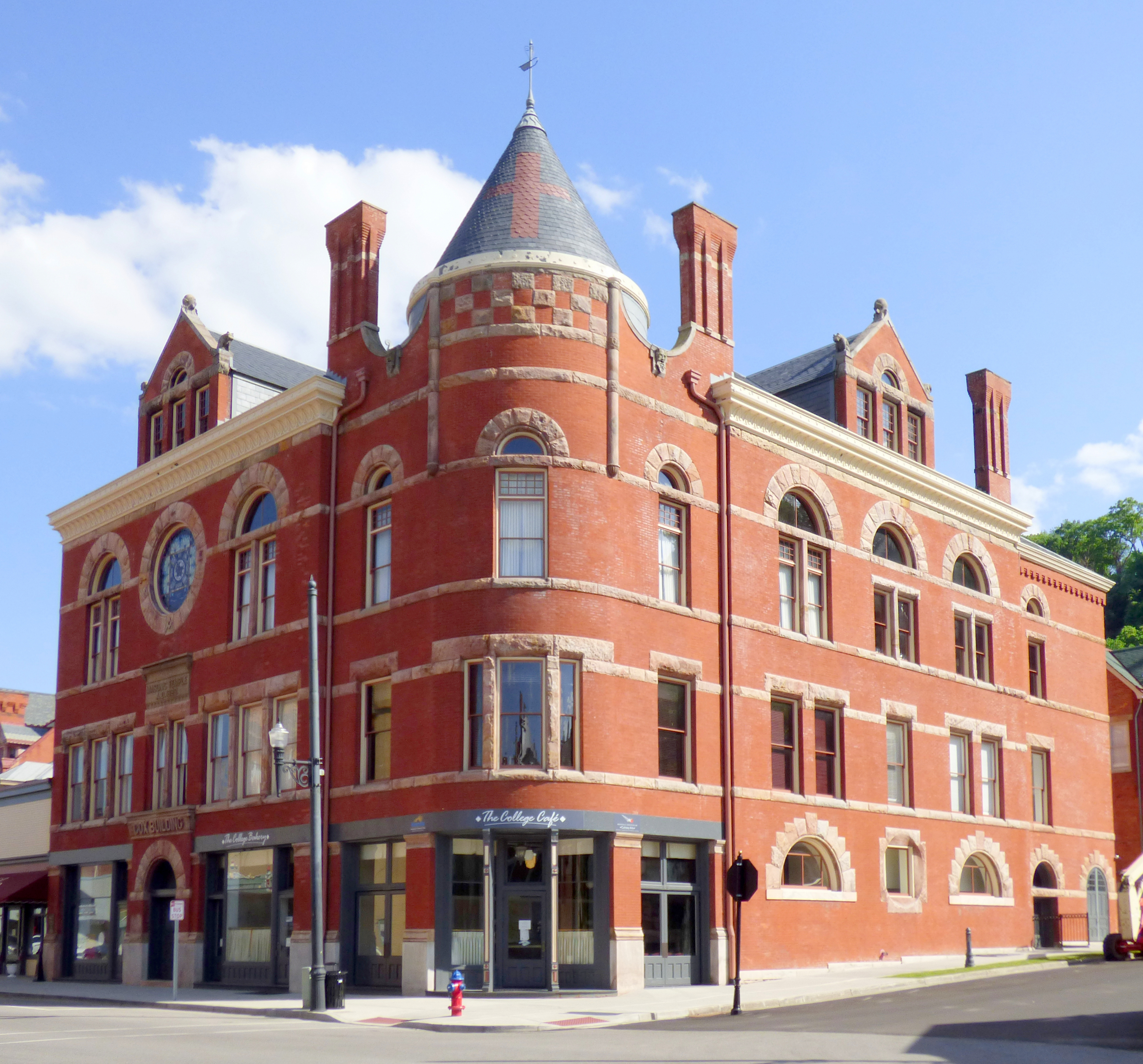
- The Cox Building

- Location within Kentucky Location within the United States
- Location: 2-8 E. 3rd St. Maysville, Kentucky
- Coordinates: 38°38′48″N 83°45′54″W
- Built: 1887
- Architect: W. R. Brown
- Architectural style: Richardsonian Romanesque
- NRHP reference No.: 11000538
- Added to NRHP: August 18, 2011

The Cox Building is a historic building located in Maysville, Kentucky, United States. Brothers George L. and William Hopkinson Cox began construction of the Richardsonian Romanesque structure at Third and Market Streets in 1886 and completed construction the following year. The project also included the construction of seven contiguous brick homes extending south along the east side of Market Street to Fourth Street.

The building was designed to accommodate three large storefronts on the ground floor with associated second-story storerooms for each. The remainder of the second floor was originally designed as an upscale professional office space for up to nine tenants. In practice, the nine offices were often joined into larger office suites and were later converted into apartments. The upper three stories of the Cox Building were designed explicitly for use as a Masonic Temple, specifically for the York Rite "Knights Templar".

The City of Maysville purchased the building in 2006 for $200,000 as a restoration project. The roof, fourth and fifth floors were destroyed by fire on November 9, 2010. Restoration work continued and the completed work was dedicated at 11:00 am on September 7, 2012.
