= 1912 United States Senate election in Kentucky =

- January 16, 1912
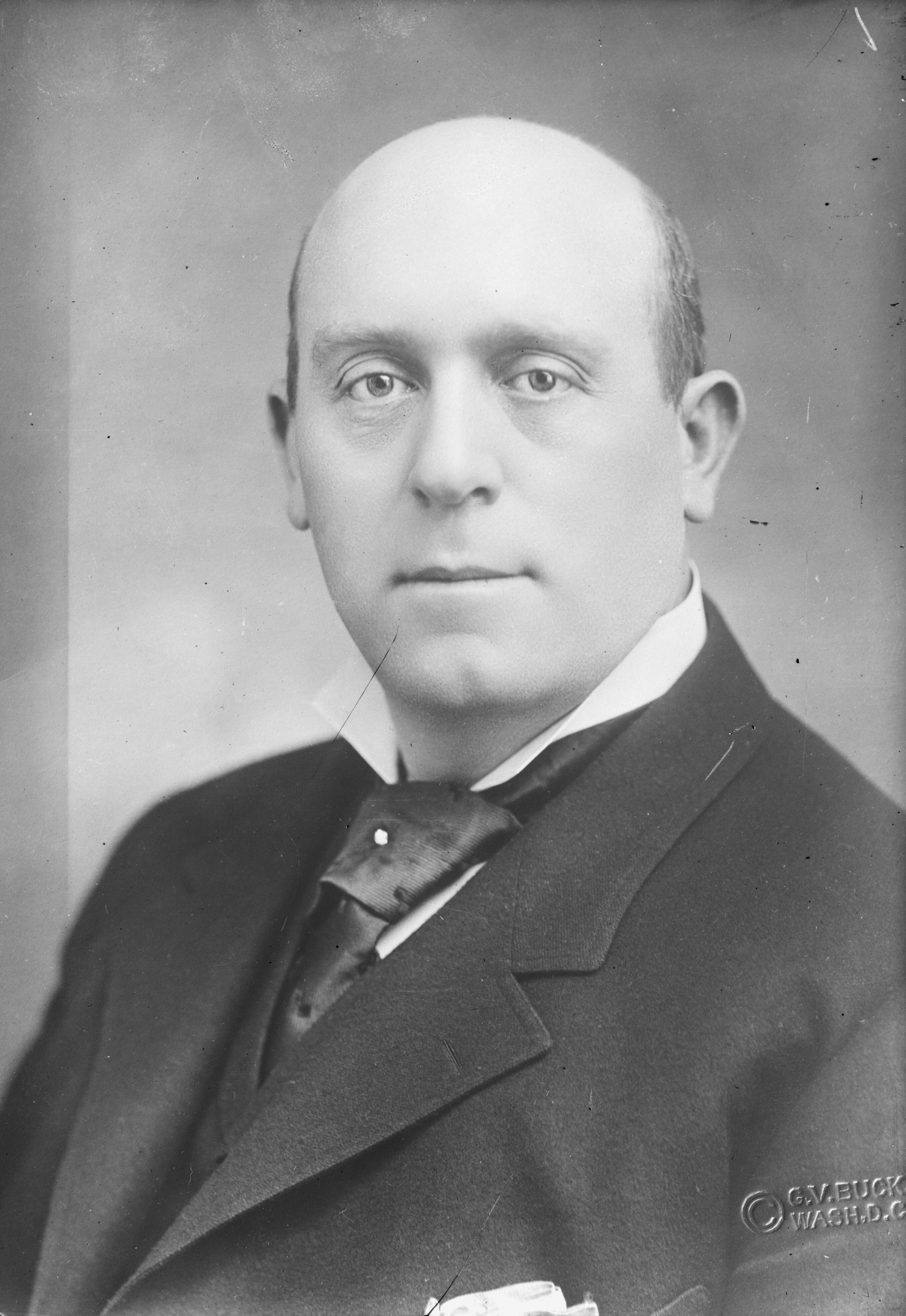

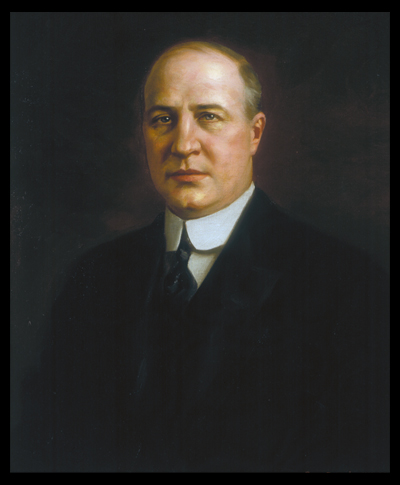
Nominee	Ollie Murray James	Edwin P. Morrow
Party	Democratic	Republican
Senate ballot	31 (83.8%)	6 (16.2%)
House ballot	74 (76.3%)	23 (23.7%)
- Blue denotes members voting for James and red denotes those voting for Morrow.
U.S. Senator before election
Thomas H. Paynter
Democratic
Elected U.S. Senator
Ollie Murray James
Democratic

The 1912 United States Senate election in Kentucky was held on January 16, 1912, after an initial election on January 9, 1912. Democratic representative Ollie Murray James was elected by the Kentucky General Assembly to the United States Senate. The election was held twice due to ambiguity in the law setting the election date. This was the last senate election in Kentucky before the ratification of the Seventeenth Amendment, which mandated the election of senators by popular vote.

== Democratic primary ==
The Democratic Party chose to select its candidate by a primary election, which was not required by law. The election was held Saturday, July 1, 1911. The only candidates to submit their names for the election were James and incumbent senator Thomas H. Paynter. However, Paynter withdrew his candidacy before the election was held, leaving James without opposition.

=== Candidates ===
- Ollie Murray James, U.S. representative for Kentucky's 1st congressional district (1903–1913)
- Thomas H. Paynter, U.S. senator (1907–1913) (withdrew June 24, 1911)

== Republican nomination ==
The Republican Party chose to select its candidate by legislative caucus, with Edwin P. Morrow winning the nomination unanimously on Monday, January 1, 1912.

=== Candidates ===
- Edwin P. Morrow, U.S. District Attorney for the Eastern District of Kentucky (1910–1913)

== Elections ==
=== First election ===
==== Senate ====
1912 United States Senate election in Kentucky (first Senate ballot)
Party	Candidate	Votes	%
Democratic	Ollie Murray James	31	88.6
Republican	Edwin P. Morrow	4	11.4
Total votes		35	100.0

==== House of Representatives ====
1912 United States Senate election in Kentucky (first House ballot)
Party	Candidate	Votes	%
Democratic	Ollie Murray James	75	75.8
Republican	Edwin P. Morrow	24	24.2
Total votes		99	100.0

=== Second election ===
==== Senate ====
1912 United States Senate election in Kentucky (Senate)
Party	Candidate	Votes	%
Democratic	Ollie Murray James	31	83.8
Republican	Edwin P. Morrow	6	16.2
Total votes		37	100.0
Democratic hold			

==== House of Representatives ====
1912 United States Senate election in Kentucky (House of Representatives)
Party	Candidate	Votes	%
Democratic	Ollie Murray James	74	76.3
Republican	Edwin P. Morrow	23	23.7
Total votes		97	100.0
Democratic hold			

== See also ==
- 1912–13 United States Senate elections

== Sources ==
- "Journal of the Senate of the Commonwealth of Kentucky, 1912 v. 1". Journals of the Kentucky General Assembly. Frankfort, Kentucky – via HathiTrust.
