= William Hopkinson Cox =

American politician (1856–1950)

William H. Cox
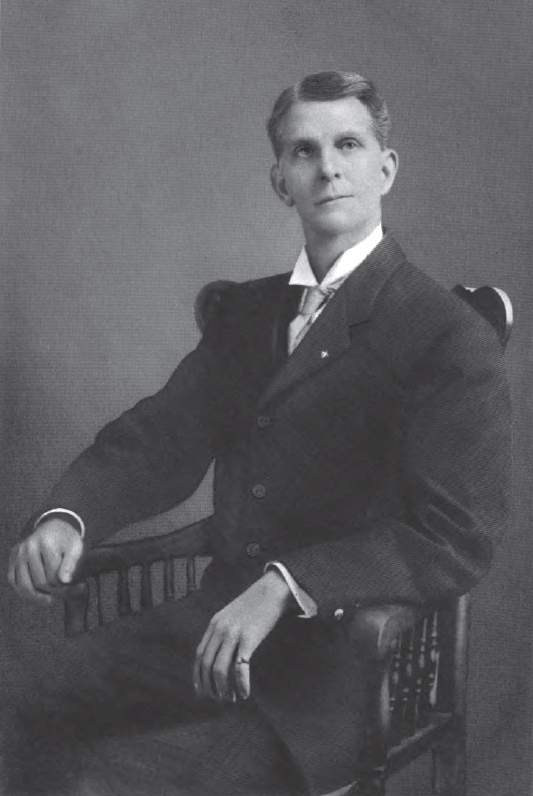

30th Lieutenant Governor of Kentucky
- In office December 10, 1907 – December 12, 1911
- Governor: Augustus E. Willson
- Preceded by: William P. Thorne
- Succeeded by: Edward J. McDermott

Member of the Kentucky Senate from the 31st district
- In office January 1, 1900 – December 10, 1907
- Preceded by: J. D. Rummans
- Succeeded by: Bert C. Grigsby

Personal details
- Born: October 22, 1856 Maysville, Kentucky, U.S.
- Died: October 13, 1950 (aged 93) Mason County, Kentucky, U.S.
- Party: Republican
- Spouse: Susan E. Farrow

William Hopkinson Cox (October 22, 1856 – October 13, 1950) was an American politician, who served as the 30th lieutenant governor of Kentucky from 1907 to 1911, under Governor Augustus E. Willson.

== Early life and family ==
Cox was born October 22, 1856, in Maysville, Kentucky. He was the son of William Hopkinson and Elizabeth R. (Newman) Cox. His paternal grandfather, George Cox, immigrated from London, England, in 1817 and founded a dry goods store in Maysville, Kentucky, in 1819.

Cox was educated in the private schools of Maysville. He began working in the family store at age fifteen, and he and his brother George assumed operation of the store when their father died in 1885. In 1904, the brothers sold the successful business to the firm of D. Hunt and Son. In 1889, Cox became president of the State National Bank in Maysville, holding this position until 1901. He was also director of the Electric Light and Gas Company for a time.

Cox took an active part in the development of Maysville, financing the construction of the Cox Building in that city. He also owned a housing terrace on Market Street between Third and Fourth Streets in Maysville, which became known as the Cox Block of Maysville.

In 1880, Cox married Susan E. Farrow, niece of the Chief Justice Peters of the Kentucky Court of Appeals. They had one daughter, Roberta Stockton (Cox) Wheat. Cox and his wife were faithful adherents of the Episcopal church.

== Political career ==
For seven years, Cox served on the Maysville City Council, presiding over the Council for five of those years. In 1888, he was chosen as the Republican nominee for a seat in the U.S. House of Representatives, but he declined the nomination. In November 1893, Cox was elected mayor of the city of Maysville. He was the first mayor of the city elected under the new Kentucky Constitution of 1891.

Cox was a delegate to the 1892 Republican National Convention that nominated Benjamin Harrison for a second term as President of the United States. He was chosen as Kentucky's representative to the delegation that officially notified Harrison of his renomination.

Cox was elected to represent Mason and Lewis counties in the Kentucky Senate. He was re-elected once, serving a total of eight years. During his term, he supported the local option solution to the question of prohibition. In 1906, he received every Republican vote in the legislature for the election to the United States Senate, but lost to Democrat Thomas H. Paynter.

Cox was elected Lieutenant Governor of Kentucky in 1907, serving under Governor Augustus E. Willson. He died October 13, 1950.

Political offices
Preceded by William P. Thorne	Lieutenant Governor of Kentucky; 1907–1911	Succeeded by Edward J. McDermott
