= William Birch Haldeman =

State adjutant general for the Kentucky Army National Guard (1912–1914)

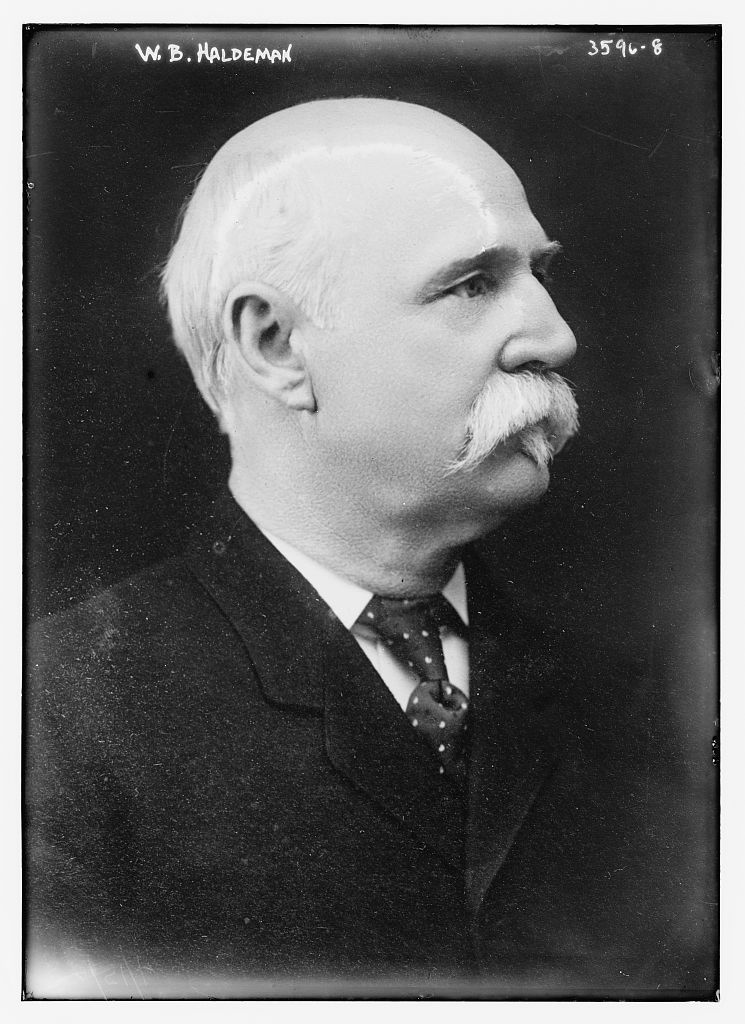
William Birch Haldeman circa 1915

William Birch Haldeman (July 27, 1846 – October 27, 1924) was the state adjutant general for the Kentucky Army National Guard from 1912 to 1914. He was part owner of The Courier-Journal and The Louisville Times.

== Biography ==
He was born on July 27, 1846, in Louisville, Kentucky, to Walter N. Haldeman. November 29, 1876, he married Lizzie Robards Offutt (1857–1930) in Shelbyville, Shelby County, Kentucky.

He was the state adjutant general for the Kentucky Army National Guard from 1912 to 1914.

He died on October 27, 1924, in Louisville while attending a horse race at Churchill Downs.
