= Walter Lanfersiek =

American lawyer

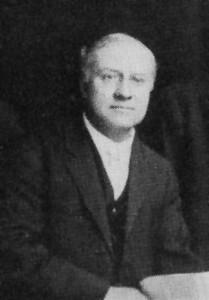
Walter Lanfersiek

Walter B. Lanfersiek also known as Walter B. Landell (February 3, 1873 – March 1, 1962) was an American attorney and political activist from Newport, Kentucky. Lanfersiek was the executive secretary of the Socialist Party of America from 1913 to 1916, during which time he was a close confidant of multi-time presidential candidate Eugene V. Debs. In the 1911 gubernatorial election, Lanfersiek was the Socialist Party of Kentucky's nominee for governor.

Lanfersiek was born in Cincinnati, Ohio in 1873 to parents William Henry and Elizabeth Lanfersiek. He graduated from Woodward High School. He earned a Bachelor of Law degree from the University of Cincinnati in 1895.

Lanfersiek was married to fellow socialist Pearl A. Blanchard, who ran for Newport School Commission in 1912.
