= Little Genesee, New York =

- Hamlet
- Location within New York Location within the United States
- Coordinates: 42°01′37″N 78°12′22″W
- Country: United States
- State: New York
- County: Allegany
- Town: Genesee
- Elevation: 1,552 ft (473 m)
- Time zone: UTC-5 (Eastern (EST))
  - Summer (DST): UTC-4 (EDT)
- ZIP Code: 14754
- Area code: 585
- GNIS feature ID: 955539

Little Genesee is a hamlet in the town of Genesee, Allegany County, New York, United States. The community is located along New York State Route 417, 3.4 miles (5.5 km) southwest of Bolivar. Little Genesee has a post office with ZIP code 14754, which opened on August 6, 1845.
