= Thomas H. Paynter =

American politician (1851–1921)

Thomas Hanson Paynter
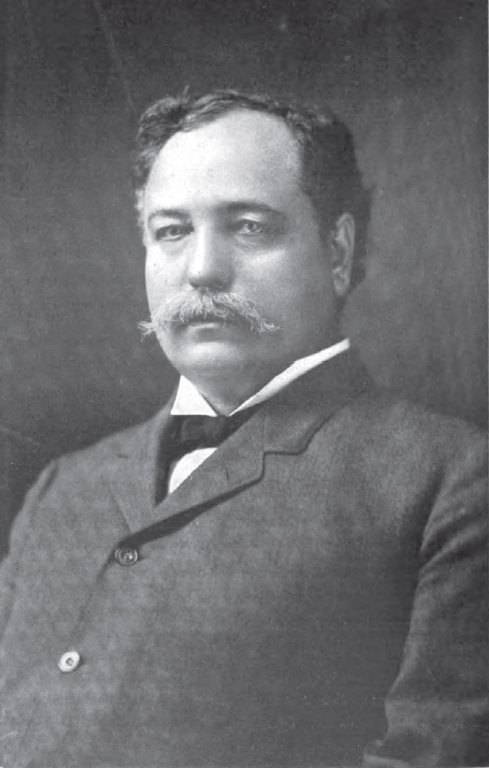
- Paynter, c. 1910

United States Senator from Kentucky
- In office March 4, 1907 – March 4, 1913
- Preceded by: J. C. S. Blackburn
- Succeeded by: Ollie M. James

Justice of the Kentucky Court of Appeals
- In office January 7, 1895 – August 1, 1906
- Preceded by: Seat established
- Succeeded by: John M. Lassing

Member of the U.S. House of Representatives from Kentucky's 9th district
- In office March 4, 1889 – January 5, 1895
- Preceded by: George M. Thomas
- Succeeded by: Samuel J. Pugh

Personal details
- Born: December 9, 1851 Vanceburg, Kentucky
- Died: March 8, 1921 (aged 69) Frankfort, Kentucky
- Resting place: Frankfort Cemetery
- Party: Democratic

Thomas Hanson Paynter (December 9, 1851 – March 8, 1921) was a United States senator and representative from Kentucky.

== Early life and education ==
Born on a farm near Vanceburg, Kentucky, Paynter attended the common schools, Rand's Academy, and Centre College. There he studied law, was admitted to the bar in 1872, and commenced practice in Greenup, Kentucky. He served as the prosecuting attorney of Greenup County, Kentucky from 1876 to 1882, and then resumed the practice of law in Greenup.

== Career ==
Paynter was elected as a Democrat to the Fifty-first, Fifty-second, and Fifty-third Congresses in the U.S. House of Representatives, serving from March 4, 1889, until January 5, 1895. There he served as chairman of the U.S. House Committee on Expenditures in the Post Office Department. He resigned in 1895, having been elected as a justice of the Kentucky Court of Appeals, where he served from 1895 to 1906. He resigned from this position as well, having been elected a U.S. Senator in the 1906 United States Senate election in Kentucky.

Paynter served in the Senate from March 4, 1907, to March 3, 1913. He was not a candidate for reelection in 1912. In the Senate he served as chairman of the U.S. Senate Committee to Examine Branches of the Civil Service. After his career in politics, he moved to Frankfort, Kentucky, in 1913 to continue the practice of law and follow agricultural pursuits. He died in Frankfort and was interred in the State Cemetery.

U.S. House of Representatives
Preceded by George M. Thomas	United States Representative from Kentucky's 9th district 1889 - 1895	Succeeded by Samuel Johnson Pugh
U.S. Senate
Preceded by J. C. S. Blackburn	United States Senator (Class 2) from Kentucky; 1907 - 1913	Succeeded by Ollie M. James
