= Augustus E. Willson =

American politician (1846–1931)

Augustus Willson
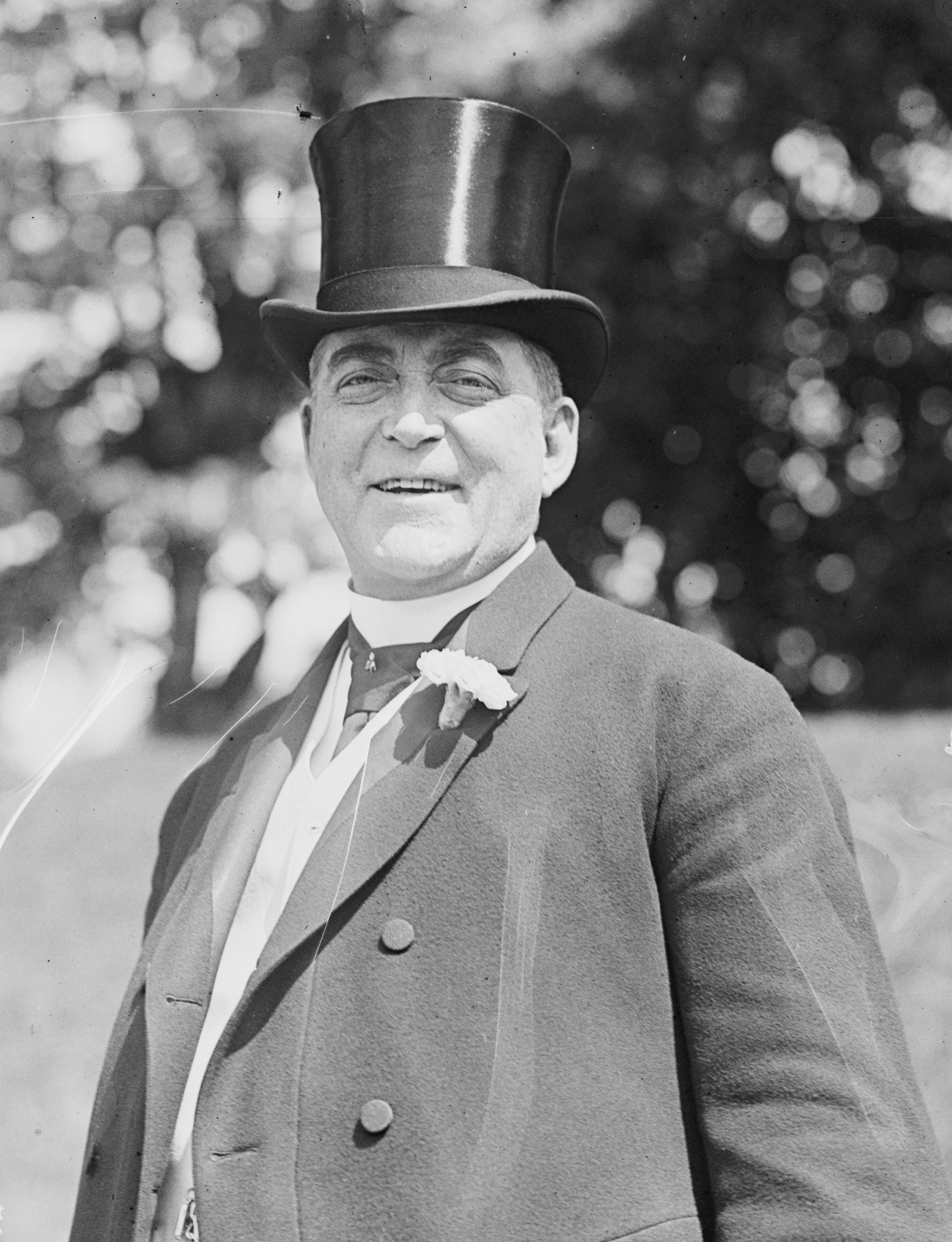
- Willson in 1908

Chair of the National Governors Association
- In office May 13, 1908 – September 12, 1911
- Preceded by: Position established
- Succeeded by: Francis E. McGovern

36th Governor of Kentucky
- In office December 10, 1907 – December 12, 1911
- Lieutenant: William Hopkinson Cox
- Preceded by: J. C. W. Beckham
- Succeeded by: James B. McCreary

Personal details
- Born: October 13, 1846 Maysville, Kentucky, U.S.
- Died: August 24, 1931 (aged 84) Louisville, Kentucky, U.S.
- Resting place: Cave Hill Cemetery; Louisville, Kentucky, U.S.
- Party: Republican
- Spouse: Mary Ekin (m. 1877)
- Relations: Forceythe Willson (brother)
- Children: 1
- Education: Harvard University (BA, MA)

Augustus Everett Willson (October 13, 1846 – August 24, 1931) was an American politician and the 36th governor of Kentucky. Orphaned at the age of twelve, Willson went to live with relatives in New England. This move exposed him to such authors as Ralph Waldo Emerson, Henry Wadsworth Longfellow, Oliver Wendell Holmes, and James Russell Lowell, who were associates of his older brother, poet Forceythe Willson. He was also afforded the opportunity to attend Harvard University, where he earned an A.B. in 1869 and an A.M. in 1872. After graduation, he secured a position at the law firm of future Supreme Court justice John Marshall Harlan. Willson and Harlan became lifelong friends, and Willson's association with Harlan deepened his support of the Republican Party.

A Republican in a primarily Democratic state, Willson suffered several defeats for public office, but was elected governor of Kentucky on his second attempt. Due to his handling of the Black Patch Tobacco Wars and his pardoning of several individuals involved in the assassination of Democratic governor William Goebel, Willson drew the ire of the Democrat-controlled General Assembly. As a result, few of his proposed reforms were considered by the legislature. His term ended in 1911, and in 1914, he made an unsuccessful bid for a seat in the U.S. Senate. Following this defeat, Willson retired to Louisville, where he died in 1931.

== Early life ==
Augustus Willson was born on October 13, 1846, in Maysville, Kentucky, the second child of Hiram and Ann Colvin (née Ennis) Willson. A year following his birth, his father moved the family to Covington. In 1852, the family moved again, this time to New Albany, Indiana. In 1856, Willson's mother died. Three years later, his father also died, leaving him an orphan at age twelve. He and his younger sister went to live with their grandmother in Allegany County, New York. Willson then moved to Cambridge, Massachusetts, to live with his brother Forceythe Willson, who had become a poet of some renown. There, he was exposed to men of letters such as Ralph Waldo Emerson, Henry Wadsworth Longfellow, Oliver Wendell Holmes, and James Russell Lowell.

Willson took a preparatory course of study at Alfred Academy in New York. Later, he enrolled for one year at a preparatory school in Cambridge before matriculating to Harvard University in 1865. His brother Forceythe became terminally ill during Augustus' sophomore year, and the younger man took a brief hiatus from his studies to care for him. Following Forceythe's death, Willson resumed his studies, and received a Bachelor of Arts degree in 1869.

After graduation, Willson studied at Harvard Law School, receiving a Master of Arts degree in 1872. He also studied in the law firm of Lothrop, Bishop, and Lincoln in Boston. He returned to New Albany in 1870, where he lived with Indiana congressman Michael C. Kerr and was admitted to the bar. In 1874, Kerr wrote a letter of introduction for Willson when he applied for a position in the Louisville law firm of John Marshall Harlan. Harlan described Willson as "one of the brightest young fellows I ever met." The two became lifelong friends, and Willson's association with Harlan deepened his support of the Republican Party. Willson became a junior partner in Harlan's firm, continuing there until Harlan's appointment as a Supreme Court justice in 1877.

== Political career ==
Willson's political career began when was he appointed chief clerk of the U.S. Treasury Department under Benjamin Bristow. He served in this capacity from December 1875 to August 1876, resigning to continue his law practice in Louisville. On July 23, 1877, Willson married Mary Elizabeth Ekin in Louisville;^{[a]} their only child died as an infant.

A Republican in a predominantly Democratic state, Willson suffered several defeats as he ran for public office. His 1879 loss in an election for a seat in the Kentucky Senate marked the first in a string of political defeats. He failed in bids to represent Kentucky's Fifth District in the U.S. House of Representatives in 1884, 1886, 1888, and 1892. But he continued to be active in the Republican Party and was a delegate to the Republican National Convention in 1884, 1888, 1892, 1904, 1908, and 1916. In 1897, he was a member of the executive committee at the national monetary conference in Indianapolis, Indiana, where he advocated a sound money position.

In 1903, Willson sought the Republican gubernatorial nomination. He had the backing of William O. Bradley, who in 1895 had become the first Republican governor in the state's history. Others at the convention favored Louisville businessman Morris B. Belknap. After a ruling against a contested delegation to the convention, Willson withdrew his candidacy. Bradley, angered that the party had not united behind his candidate, boycotted the convention. Belknap was handily defeated by Democrat J. C. W. Beckham in the general election.

=== Governor of Kentucky ===
In 1907, Willson was chosen by acclamation as the Republican candidate for governor. Willson's opponent had been chosen at a nominating convention two years earlier. Governor Beckham had convinced the Democrats to hold their primary early so he could secure the party's nomination for the 1908 senatorial election while he was still serving as governor. He wanted to influence the selection of his would-be successor. Using his clout as governor, Beckham ensured the selection of Samuel Wilber Hager as the party's gubernatorial nominee.

The chief campaign issue was the ongoing Black Patch Tobacco Wars in western Kentucky. Hager carried the stigma of being the hand-picked candidate of Governor Beckham, who had largely ignored the violence during his administration. On the other hand, Willson had twice represented the American Tobacco Company as their attorney. Western farmers had resisted their monopoly of tobacco prices and were trying to express their own power through the PPA; but they had begun to use violence against farmers who would not join the association. Democrats made much of this issue, and Willson did little to counter accusations that he was unsympathetic to the plight of the farmers. Hager tried to appeal to both sides of the conflict, but ultimately lost the support of both. Willson's position appealed to urban voters who wanted the state's reputation for violence to end even if it meant siding with the tobacco industry against the state's farmers.

In the general election, Willson garnered 214,481 votes to 196,428 for Hager. (Scattered votes were also cast for minor party candidates.) Strong support from urban areas swung the election for Willson. Half of Willson's 18,000-vote majority came from the city of Louisville. Republicans also won the mayoral races in Louisville and Paducah. A disagreement between Hager and an associate of Governor Beckham caused Beckham's support for his candidate to wane. Voters who favored prohibition – strong supporters of Beckham for his pro-temperance stand – also deserted Hager, who vacillated on the issue.

Willson was sworn in on December 10, 1907. Almost immediately, he drew the ire of the Democratic General Assembly for his handling of the Black Patch Wars. In contrast to Beckham's inaction, Willson immediately deployed the state militia and declared martial law in twenty western counties. Many white residents there had been allied with the Confederacy and were predominately Democratic. While the troops were helpful, there were never more than three hundred deployed, and they were not a major factor in ending the violence. Hostile Democrats in the General Assembly formed an investigative committee that found Willson guilty of violating the state's constitution by calling out the militia without a formal request by civil authorities. Willson also sent spies to infiltrate the "Night Riders" – an organization of vigilantes who perpetrated much of the violence – and determine which local officials supported them. He publicly announced he would pardon anyone who killed a Night Rider. This decision was hailed by some newspapers as an effective deterrent, while others criticized it as encouraging more lawlessness.

Willson's interventions ultimately had little to do with the end of the violence. He may have been more effective in ending violence associated with the Reelfoot Lake uprising in 1908, also located in western Kentucky and Tennessee. In 1908, juries convicted six men of murder in the related kidnapping and murder of Captain Quentin Rankin in Lake County, Tennessee. Many of the Night Rider leaders escaped being convicted and some were never prosecuted, but such court actions dampened the violence.

A 1909 measure sponsored by Kentucky representative Augustus O. Stanley removed a national tax on tobacco. In 1911, the Supreme Court of the United States found the American Tobacco Company to be in violation of antitrust laws. Each of these events helped raise tobacco prices, which pacified the farmers.

Willson further alienated the legislature by issuing pardons for several individuals convicted of complicity in the assassination of Governor William Goebel (1900). These included former Republican governor William S. Taylor (1899–1900) and Taylor's Secretary of State, Caleb Powers. Henry Youtsey, who was convicted for complicity in the assassination but turned state's evidence, was not pardoned. Democrats accused Willson of making partisan pardons of Taylor and Powers. Goebel's likeness was also removed from state checks and documents and was replaced by likenesses of either Abraham Lincoln, Henry Clay, or John C. Breckinridge.

The 1908 session of the General Assembly was dubbed the "Education Legislature". Its most significant accomplishment was passing legislation establishing high schools in every county of the state. It further increased funding for the newly renamed State University (later the University of Kentucky) and strengthened school attendance requirements. Other progressive reforms were also passed, including a stronger child labor law and a law establishing a juvenile court system. Off-track betting was made illegal, and abortion was defined as a crime.

In his biennial message to the legislature in 1910, Willson called for a uniform system of accounting based on legislation recently passed in the neighboring state of Indiana. He also advocated a measure requiring full disclosure of campaign expenditures. Due to its hostility toward Willson, the Assembly scarcely considered the governor's agenda or other needed legislation such as tax reform and redistricting. The reforms Willson advocated would later pass under a Democratic administration. The few accomplishments of this legislature included making electrocution the legal form of capital punishment and establishing of an eight-hour work day for public workers.

Outside the state, Willson enjoyed somewhat higher esteem. In 1908, Harvard University presented him with an honorary Doctor of Laws degree. Also in 1908, President Theodore Roosevelt called a meeting of state governors in Washington, D.C., to discuss conservation of natural resources. Willson was elected to chair this meeting, which became known as the National Governors' Conference. The meeting sparked interest in an annual gubernatorial meeting, and in 1910, Willson organized a second conference and was again elected chair. Although some had advocated for a House of Governors that would propose uniform state laws, Willson's opening remarks made it clear that this was not the intent of the National Governors' Conference. "This meeting has no legal authority whatever," Willson stated. "It is not a house of Governors. It is simply a conference of Governors."

== Later life ==
In the gubernatorial election of 1911, Republicans were divided as to whether they should celebrate Willson's administration or downplay it. His actions to quell the violence in the Black Patch Wars and his pardons to Taylor and Powers were both unpopular with many voters. The eventual candidate, Edward C. O'Rear, was lukewarm at best to Willson's administration. Willson was upset by this hesitancy and lent O'Rear only modest support on the campaign trail. Former governor Bradley also disagreed with O'Rear's selection and engaged in minimal campaigning. The failure of the party to unite behind their candidate gave Democrat James B. McCreary an easy victory.

Following his term as governor, Willson returned to his legal practice in Louisville. From 1910 to 1919, he served on the Harvard University Board of Overseers. In 1914, he was a candidate for the Senate seat of Johnson Camden. It was the state's first senatorial election since passage of the Seventeenth Amendment, meaning the seat would be filled by popular vote rather than by a vote of the legislature. The seat had originally belonged to former governor Bradley, who had died in office. Governor McCreary appointed Camden to fill the unexpired term, but Camden had agreed not to seek re-election so that J. C. W. Beckham could run for the seat. In the Republican primary, Willson defeated Richard P. Ernst. In the general election, the unpopularity of Willson's gubernatorial administration combined with the overwhelming popularity of Democratic President Woodrow Wilson, ensured that Beckham won the seat by more than 32,000 votes. This campaign was Willson's last. He died on August 24, 1931, and is buried in the Cave Hill Cemetery in Louisville.

== Notes ==
^[a] Appleton and the National Governors Association list the name as "Ekin." Powell suggests "Elkin," while Harrison lists "Ekins." The correct spelling is Ekin; she was the daughter of General James A. Ekin.

Party political offices
Preceded by Morris B. Belknap	Republican nominee for Governor of Kentucky; 1907	Succeeded by Edward C. O'Rear
Preceded by William Marshall Bullitt	Republican nominee for U.S. Senator from Kentucky (Class 3); 1914	Succeeded by Richard P. Ernst
Political offices
Preceded by J. C. W. Beckham	Governor of Kentucky; 1907–1911	Succeeded by James B. McCreary
New office	Chair of the National Governors Association; 1908–1911	Succeeded by Francis E. McGovern
