= Pettit =

Pettit may refer to:

- Pettit (surname), people with this name

== Places ==
- Pettit (lunar crater)
- Pettit (Martian crater), on Mars
- Pettit, Indiana
- Pettit, Kentucky
- Pettit, Oklahoma
- Pettit Creek, a creek in Bartow County, Georgia
- Pettit Lake, a large alpine lake in Blaine County, Idaho, United States
- Pettit Barracks, in Zamboanga City (Mindanao, the Philippines)
- Pettit Memorial Chapel, Frank Lloyd Wright building
- Pettit National Ice Center, in West Allis, Wisconsin
- Roberto L. Pettit (neighborhood), a neighbourhood (barrio) of Asunción, Paraguay
- Claude W. Pettit College of Law, a private, non-profit law school located in Ada, Ohio, United States

== Ships ==
- USS Pettit (DE-253), Edsall-class destroyer escort
- USS O. M. Pettit (1857), U.S. Navy Civil War tugboat

== See also ==
- Petit (disambiguation)
- Pettitt (surname)
- Pettits (ward), an electoral ward in the London Borough of Havering, London
- Andy Pettitte (1972– ), American baseball player
