= Thomas Pettit =

Thomas Pettit may refer to:

- Thomas Pettit (mayor) (1858–1934), mayor of Nelson, New Zealand
- Thomas M. Pettit (1797–1853), politician and judge from Pennsylvania
- Thomas S. Pettit (1843–1931), newspaper publisher and politician from Kentucky
- Tom Pettit (1931–1995), NBC news correspondent
- Tom Pettit (footballer) (1885–1970), Australian rules footballer

== See also ==
- Tom Pettitt (1859–1946), American real tennis player
- Pettit (surname)
