= Parker Watkins Hardin =

American politician (1841–1920)

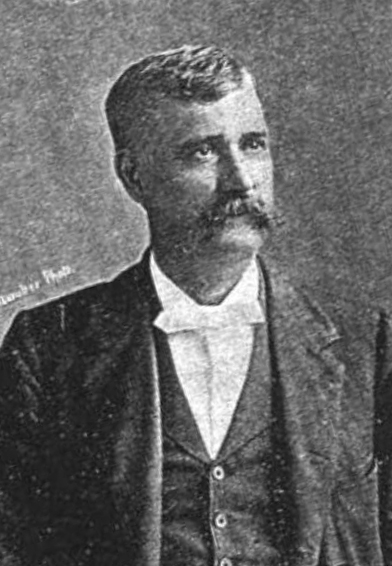

Attorney General of Kentucky
- In office 1879–1888
- Governor: Luke P. Blackburn; J. Proctor Knott; Simon Bolivar Buckner
- Preceded by: Thomas Moss
- Succeeded by: W. J. Hendricks

Personal details
- Born: June 3, 1841 Adair County, Kentucky
- Died: July 25, 1920 (aged 79) Richmond, Virginia
- Resting place: Frankfort Cemetery
- Party: Democratic
- Spouse: Mary E. Sallee (m. 1864)
- Profession: Lawyer

Parker Watkins ("Wat") Hardin (June 3, 1841 – July 25, 1920) was a politician from the U.S. state of Kentucky. From 1879 to 1888, he served as Attorney General of Kentucky. He was an unsuccessful candidate for Governor of Kentucky in 1891, 1895 and 1899.

== Early life ==
Parker Watkins Hardin was born in Adair County, Kentucky. He was the second child of Parker C. and Carolina (Watkins) Hardin. His father was the nephew of Congressman Benjamin Hardin and served in the Kentucky Senate from 1840 to 1848. Known to friends as "P. Wat," "Watt," "P. W.," "Parker," and sometimes "Polly Wolly", the younger Hardin was educated in the schools of Adair County, then studied law with his father.

In December 1864, Hardin married Mary E. Sallee. The couple had four children. The following year, he was admitted to the bar of Columbia, the county seat of Adair County. He formed a law partnership with his brother, Charles A. Hardin, in the city of Harrodsburg, Kentucky.

== Political career ==
Hardin's political career began in 1865 when he was elected city attorney for the city of Danville, Kentucky. In 1879, state Democrats nominated him for attorney general. A polished orator, he stumped for Democratic gubernatorial candidate Luke P. Blackburn when Blackburn became ill during the campaign. Despite Blackburn's illness, the entire Democratic slate was elected.

Hardin was re-nominated in 1883 on a Democratic slate that included J. Proctor Knott for governor against Republican Thomas Z. Morrow. Morrow's brother-in-law, William O. Bradley, was one of the Republican Party's strongest speakers, and he vigorously attacked the record of previous Democratic administrations, particularly that of Governor Blackburn. Hardin defended Blackburn's administration in a speech that drew heavy praise from Louisville Courier-Journal editor Henry Watterson. Watterson reprinted Hardin's entire speech in the Courier-Journal. Once again, the entire Democratic slate was elected by a large majority.

=== Gubernatorial election of 1891 ===
Hardin was re-elected as attorney general 1887. In 1891, he was one of four men who sought the Democratic gubernatorial nomination. The others were ex-Confederate John Y. Brown, Cassius Clay Jr. (nephew of the noted abolitionist), and Dr. John Daniel Clardy, a member of Kentucky's Farmers' Alliance. In the Democratic nominating convention, Brown led the field with 275 votes to Clay's 264, Clardy's 190, and Hardin's 186. Clay and Clardy split the votes of the state's agricultural interests, while Hardin and Clardy divided the free silver votes.

The vote count changed little over the next nine ballots, although Hardin moved ahead of Clardy. After the tenth ballot, the convention chair announced that the candidate with the fewest votes would be dropped. That turned out to be Clardy, and his delegates split their votes nearly equally among the remaining three candidates. On the next vote, Hardin was dropped. His delegates supported Brown, who won the nomination on the thirteenth ballot. Brown went on to win the governorship over candidates from the Republican, Populist, and Prohibition parties.

=== Gubernatorial election of 1895 ===
Democrats entered the 1895 gubernatorial election badly split over the question of free silver. Party leaders John G. Carlisle, Henry Watterson, and William Lindsay were all advocates of sound money principles. At the party's nominating convention, these leaders succeeded in getting the party to adopt a platform that included a sound money plank. Nevertheless, the delegates chose Hardin, a free silver supporter, as their gubernatorial candidate over Cassius Clay Jr., a sound money supporter. Historian James C. Klotter attributes the choice of Hardin to the candidate's overwhelming personal popularity.

Seeing the split in the Democratic ranks over the money question, Republicans, having never won the governorship of Kentucky before, put forth their strongest candidate, William O. Bradley, to oppose Hardin. The Populist Party also put forth a strong candidate, Thomas Pettit of Owensboro. The major party candidates agreed to a series of debates across the state. The first debate was held in Louisville on August 19, 1895. Hardin opened the debate with an attack on the Republican Party for its "carpetbagger despotism" during Reconstruction. Though pro-Southern oratory had long been a campaign tactic of Democratic candidates, Hardin was shocked by a heckler who cried out "The war is over; give us something else." The comment shocked Hardin, and the rest of his performance in the debate was affected. Even sympathetic newspapers admitted that his usual glowing oratory had failed him.

Despite the official party platform in favor of the gold standard, Hardin threw his support to the free silver position early in the race, believing he needed to do so to keep the party's rural agrarians from bolting to the Republicans. The strategy backfired as conservative Democrats abandoned the party. Sitting Democratic governor Brown refused to campaign for Hardin, and the Populist Party also ran Thomas S. Pettit, who siphoned off votes for Hardin. Republican Bradley also gained some Democratic votes from the American Protective Association, a secret fraternal group opposed to Catholics and immigrants. In the general election, Hardin lost to Bradley 172,436 to 163,524.

=== Gubernatorial election of 1899 ===
Hardin was among three men who sought the Democratic gubernatorial nomination in 1899. The others were former congressman William Johnson Stone and state senator William Goebel. Hardin was the early favorite to win the nomination. He was supported by the powerful Louisville and Nashville (L&N) Railroad and by Louisville political boss John Henry Whallen. His free silver views helped him with the state's populist voters, but Stone, from rural western Kentucky, was also courting those voters. Stone had an additional advantage among this group because he was not associated with a large corporation like the L&N. Goebel primarily had his support among the state's urban areas.

Just prior to the nominating convention, representatives for Goebel and Stone met to negotiate a deal whereby they could overcome the front-runner, Hardin. Goebel agreed to instruct half of his delegates from Louisville to vote for Stone in exchange for Stone's support of his choice of convention chairman. The two sides further agreed that if their candidate was defeated or withdrew, their delegates would support the other and not Hardin.

The convention opened on June 21, 1899, in Louisville's Music Hall. Stone supporter Ollie M. James nominated Judge David B. Redwine for chairman. When Urey Woodson, a Goebel supporter, seconded the nomination, the deal between the two men became apparent to all. Hardin supporters nominated William H. Sweeney of Marion County, but Sweeney was defeated by a vote of 551 1/6 to 529 5/6. Hardin incurred a further disadvantage when only four of his supporters were named to the thirteen-member committee on credentials. This committee would decide which delegates would be allowed to vote from delegations that were contested.

The following day, the credentials committee issued its report, which shifted 159 1/3 votes from Hardin to Goebel and Stone. Chairman Redwine only allowed uncontested delegations to vote on the committee's report, which was approved 441 to 328. This series of procedural defeats discouraged Hardin, and he announced his withdrawal from the race. As voting began, some Hardin delegates refused to acknowledge his withdrawal and voted for him anyway. When the Louisville delegation voted, they cast all their votes for Goebel instead of splitting them with Stone, as had been agreed earlier by the two men. At the end of the balloting, the vote was 520 for Goebel, 428 1/2 for Stone, and 126 1/2 for Hardin.

Seeing the collapse of the Stone-Goebel deal, Hardin supporters returned to their candidate on the second ballot, and they were joined by some outraged Stone supporters and even some of Goebel's delegates who were angered by his turnabout. The result of the second ballot was 395 5/12 for Stone, 359 11/16 for Hardin, and 330 2/3 for Goebel. Ten more ballots were taken before the convention adjourned for the day. The voting on the last ballot was 376 3/4 for Stone, 365 1/2 for Hardin, and 346 3/4 for Goebel.

The delegates did not convene on June 23 (a Sunday), but gathered to resume voting on Monday, June 24. The hall was packed with delegates and non-delegates; angered by Goebel's tactics and Redwine's biased rulings, both groups sang, shouted, and blew horns to disrupt the proceedings. Redwine attempted to take a roll call vote, but the noise made communication nearly impossible. Many delegations refused to vote under such conditions. Redwine announced a vote of 352 1/2 for Goebel, 261 1/2 for Stone, and 67 for Hardin, and declared Goebel the winner because he received a majority of the votes cast. Goebel declined to accept the nomination with anything less than a majority of the delegates present. Unable to proceed further, the convention adjourned for the day.

When the delegates gathered on June 25, both Stone and Hardin called for the convention to adjourn sine die, but Redwine ruled the motion out of order. This decision was appealed, but Redwine ruled the appeal out of order. The raucous delegates promised not to disrupt the proceedings and accept the result of the day's voting. Seven more ballots were cast, and the vote stood at 398 for Stone, 355 for Hardin, and 328 for Goebel. Finally, the delegates adopted a resolution to drop the candidate with the fewest votes after the twenty-fifth ballot. The result of this ballot was 389 for Goebel, 382 3/4 for Hardin, and 319 1/4 for Stone. Stone was dropped, and on the next ballot, Goebel was nominated by a vote of 561 1/2 to 529 1/2.

Following the convention, Hardin made no comment on Goebel or his nomination by the convention. Some discontent delegates began calls for a new convention, although there is no evidence that Hardin or Stone directly played any part in the organization of such a convention. Neither Hardin nor Stone gave Goebel much active support in the governor's race, and the election was won by Republican William S. Taylor.

== Later life ==
Hardin died of pneumonia in Richmond, Virginia at the age of 79. He was buried in Frankfort Cemetery in Frankfort, Kentucky.

Party political offices
Preceded by John Y. Brown	Democratic nominee for Governor of Kentucky; 1895	Succeeded by William Goebel
Legal offices
Preceded by Thomas Edward Moss	Attorney General of Kentucky; 1879–1888	Succeeded by William J. Hendrick
