= Pettit (surname) =

Pettit is an English surname of Hiberno-Norman origin. Variant spellings include Pettitt and Petitt. People with the surname include:

== In arts and media ==
- B. R. Pettit (1947–2006), American sculptor
- Catriona Pettit (born 1971), Australian television presenter
- George Pettit (born 1982), Canadian vocalist
- Alex Pettit (born 1986), American computer scientist, professor, and vocalist
- Lloyd Pettit (1927–2003), American sportscaster
- Thomas S. Pettit (1843–1931), newspaper publisher and politician from Kentucky
- Tom Pettit (1931–1995), American television news correspondent

== In government, law, and politics ==
=== Canada ===
- George Hamilton Pettit (1872–1953), Canadian politician
- Nathaniel Pettit (1724–1803), Upper Canada politician
- Trevor Pettit (born 1951), Canadian politician

=== United States ===
- Albert Pettit (1930–1997), U.S. Representative from Pennsylvania
- Alex Pettit (born 1966), American public administration official
- Charles Pettit (1736–1806), American lawyer and merchant
- John Pettit (1807–1877), United States Representative and Senator from Indiana
- John U. Pettit (1820–1881), U.S. Representative from Indiana
- Milton Pettit (1835–1873), Wisconsin politician
- Thomas M. Pettit (1797–1853), politician and judge from Pennsylvania
- Thomas S. Pettit (1843–1931), newspaper publisher and politician from Kentucky
- William B. Pettit (1825–1905), American lawyer from Virginia

=== Other countries ===
- Philip Pettit (born 1945), Irish philosopher and political theorist
- Thomas Pettit (mayor) (1858–1934), mayor of Nelson, New Zealand

== In science and academia ==
- Becky Pettit (born 1970), American sociologist
- Donald Pettit (born 1955), American astronaut
- Edison Pettit (1889–1962), American astronomer
- Joseph M. Pettit (1916–1986), American academic
- Katherine Pettit (1868–1936), American educator
- Mary DeWitt Pettit (1908–1996), American physician
- Philip Pettit (born 1945), Irish philosopher and political theorist
- Rowland Pettit (1927–1981), American chemist
- Steve Pettit, (born 1955), President of Bob Jones University

== In sport ==
=== Baseball ===
- Bob Pettit (baseball) (1861–1910), American baseball player
- Chris Pettit (born 1984), American baseball player
- Leon Pettit (1902–1974), American baseball pitcher
- Paul Pettit (1931–2020), American baseball pitcher

=== Other sports ===
- Bob Pettit (1932–2026), American basketball player
- Daniel Pettit (1915–2010), English footballer and industrialist
- Nicola Pettit (born 1978), New Zealand netball player
- Sean Pettit (born 1992), Canadian freeskier
- Terry Pettit, American volleyball coach
- Tom Pettit (footballer) (1885–1970), Australian rules footballer

== In other fields ==
- Charles Pettit (1736–1806), American lawyer and merchant
- Daniel Pettit (1915–2010), English footballer and industrialist
- Jane Bradley Pettit, American philanthropist
- Lyman C. Pettit (1868–1950), American pastor
- Robert Lee Pettit (1906–1941), American naval enlisted man; recipient of the Navy Cross
- William H. Pettit (1885–1985), New Zealand Christian missionary

== See also ==
- Andy Pettitte (born 1972), American baseball pitcher
