= William O'Connell Bradley =

American politician (1847–1914)

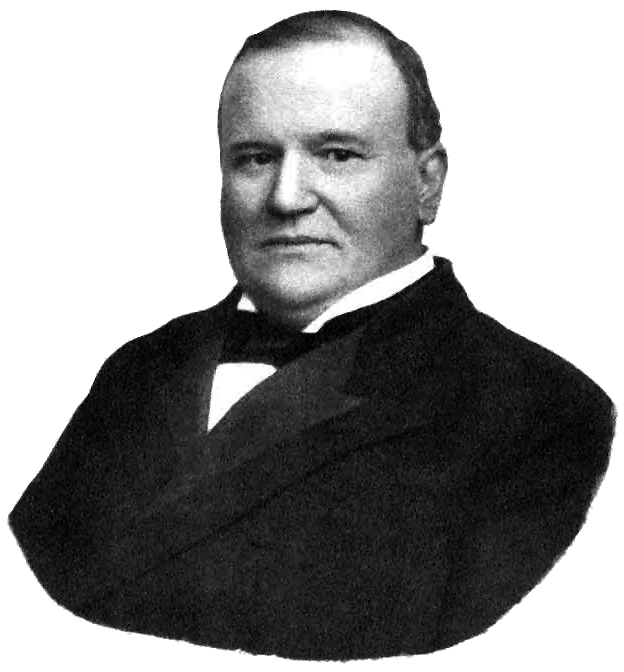

32nd Governor of Kentucky
- In office December 10, 1895 – December 12, 1899
- Lieutenant: William J. Worthington
- Preceded by: John Y. Brown
- Succeeded by: William S. Taylor

United States Senator from Kentucky
- In office March 4, 1909 – May 23, 1914
- Preceded by: James B. McCreary
- Succeeded by: Johnson N. Camden Jr.

Personal details
- Born: March 18, 1847 Garrard County, Kentucky, U.S.
- Died: May 23, 1914 (aged 67) Washington, D.C., U.S.
- Resting place: Frankfort Cemetery
- Party: Republican
- Spouse: Margaret Robinson Duncan
- Relations: Thomas Z. Morrow (brother-in-law); Edwin P. Morrow (nephew)
- Profession: Politician; lawyer

Military service
- Branch/service: Union Army
- Battles/wars: American Civil War

William O'Connell Bradley (March 18, 1847 – May 23, 1914) was an American politician from the state of Kentucky. He served as the 32nd governor of Kentucky and was later elected by the state legislature as a U.S. senator from that state. The first Republican to serve as governor of Kentucky, Bradley became known as the father of the Republican Party in Kentucky.

As a Republican in a heavily Democratic state, Bradley found little success early in his political career. He was defeated for a seat in the United States House of Representatives and in the United States Senate twice each. After rising to national prominence as a "Stalwart Republican" with his speech seconding the presidential nomination of Ulysses S. Grant at the 1880 Republican National Convention, he was nominated for governor in 1887. Although he lost the contest to Simon Bolivar Buckner, he reduced the usual Democratic majority substantially. He was again nominated for governor in 1895. Capitalizing on divisions in the Democratic Party over the issue of free silver, he defeated Parker Watkins Hardin in the general election. His term was marked by political struggles and violence. He was an advocate for African Americans and did much to advance their status in the state, but was unable to enact much of his pro-civil rights agenda due to a hostile Democratic majority in the state legislature.

Republican William S. Taylor was elected to succeed Bradley in the contentious 1899 gubernatorial election. When Democratic nominee William Goebel and his running mate J. C. W. Beckham challenged the election results, Bradley formed part of the legal team for the Republicans. The case was appealed to the Supreme Court, which found in favor of the Democrats. Despite being a member of the state's minority party, Bradley was elected to the U.S. Senate in 1907. Again, divisions within the Democratic Party played a role in his election. Bradley's opposition to Prohibition made him more palatable to some Democrats than their candidate, outgoing Governor Beckham. Beckham refused to withdraw in favor of a compromise candidate, and after two months of balloting, four Democratic legislators crossed party lines and elected Bradley. Bradley had a largely undistinguished career in the Senate. On the day he announced he would not seek re-election to his Senate seat, he was involved in a streetcar accident. He died from his injuries on May 23, 1914.

== Early life ==
William O'Connell Bradley was born near Lancaster in Garrard County, Kentucky, on March 18, 1847. He was the youngest child of Robert McAfee and Nancy Ellen (Totten) Bradley. The couple also had six daughters, five of whom survived infancy, and one other son, who died as an infant. Bradley's sister, Catherine Virginia (Bradley) Morrow, married judge Thomas Z. Morrow, who made an unsuccessful run for the governorship of Kentucky in 1883; their son, Edwin P. Morrow, was elected the 40th governor of Kentucky in 1917.

While Bradley was still a child, the family moved to Somerset, Kentucky, where Bradley was educated by private tutors and at a private school. After the outbreak of the Civil War, he twice dropped out of school and ran away to join the Union Army, first serving as a recruiting officer in Somerset, then enlisting as a private soldier in Louisville. Both times, his father removed him from the service because of his young age. Despite having only a few months of service to his credit, he was referred to as "Colonel Bradley" by many for the rest of his life.

In 1861, Bradley became a page in the Kentucky House of Representatives. He studied law under his father, one of Kentucky's leading criminal defense lawyers. Although Kentucky law required that anyone taking the bar examination be at least twenty-one years old, Bradley was allowed by a special provision of the state legislature to take it at age eighteen. This arrangement was contingent on Bradley's being judged competent by two circuit judges. Despite having no college education, Bradley passed the exam and was licensed in 1865, joining his father's firm in Lancaster. He later received an honorary Doctor of Laws degree from Kentucky University (now Transylvania University).

On July 13, 1867, Bradley married Margaret Robertson Duncan, and subsequently converted from Baptist Christianity to Presbyterianism, his wife's faith. The couple had two children, George Robertson Bradley and Christine (Bradley) South.

== Early political career ==
Bradley's political career began in 1870, when he was elected prosecuting attorney of Garrard County. A Republican in the heavily Democratic Eighth District, Bradley was defeated by Milton J. Durham for a seat in the U.S. House of Representatives in 1872. In 1875, his party honored him with a nomination to serve in the U.S. Senate, even though he was too young to legally qualify for the office. Nevertheless, he received the vote of every Republican in the state legislature. The following year, he again lost to Durham for a seat in the House of Representatives, but received 3,000 more votes than any Republican candidate had ever received in that district. He refused his party's nomination for the Senate in 1878 and 1882, and declined a nomination for state attorney general in 1879 because of ill health.

Bradley was unanimously chosen as a delegate-at-large to six consecutive Republican National Conventions. At the 1880 Republican National Convention in Chicago, he was unanimously chosen to second Roscoe Conkling's nomination of Ulysses S. Grant for a third term as president. His rousing oratory gained him the attention of prominent leaders of his party. At the 1884 convention, he was instrumental in defeating a motion to curtail Southern states' representation. President Chester A. Arthur chose Bradley to help recover financial damages from postal officials involved in the Star Route Frauds in 1885, but Bradley resigned from this responsibility over differences with U.S. Attorney General Benjamin H. Brewster regarding the prosecution of these cases.

== Gubernatorial election of 1887 ==
At their nominating convention in Louisville on May 11, 1887, Kentucky Republicans nominated Bradley for Governor of Kentucky to oppose Democrat Simon B. Buckner, a former Confederate general. In his acceptance speech, Bradley implored Kentuckians to realize that the Civil War was over and to discontinue their practice of electing ex-Confederate Democrats to public office. His platform included proposals for education, implementing a high protective tariff, and developing the state's resources. He pointed out that, though Kentucky contained more coal than Pennsylvania, the state bought half of its coal from that state. A similar situation existed with regard to lumber. He was also critical of excessive spending during the preceding Democratic administrations. Among his cited examples of extravagance were the creation of a state bureau of agriculture and the construction of a new state penitentiary. Democratic mismanagement of the state's affairs had resulted in able, young Kentuckians leaving the state to seek their fortunes because of a lack of opportunity at home, Bradley lamented.

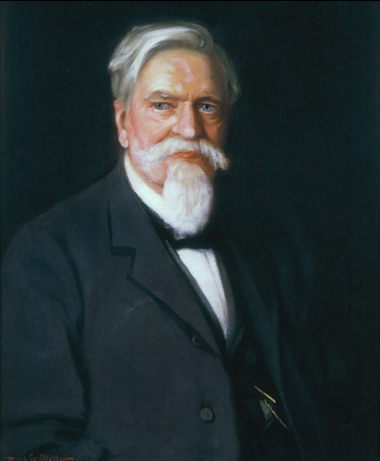
Simon Bolivar Buckner, Bradley's opponent in 1887

During the campaign, Buckner relied on party strength and personal popularity to give him an advantage over Bradley, a decidedly superior orator. In the only debate between the two, held at Grayson, Bradley attacked Democrats for creating "useless offices" such as railroad commissioners. He defended the Republican proposal of a highly protective tariff and advocated federal aid for education. When Buckner took the platform, he began by asking if Bradley had charged in an earlier speech that one of Buckner's speeches had been written by former governor J. Proctor Knott. Bradley acknowledged that he had heard that Knott had written the speech and that he (Bradley) had repeated this claim in one of his speeches. Buckner rebuked Bradley for circulating this "infamously false" charge, and withdrew his agreement to participate in any further joint debates. He then delivered a discourse attacking the protective tariff and federal aid for education.

True to his word, Buckner never again met Bradley in a joint debate. Rumors began to circulate that Buckner was afraid to meet Bradley in debate again, and Bradley did little to dispel these rumors. The Democrats were not completely united throughout the campaign, with prominent members of the party, including Milton J. Durham and State Senator Albert Seaton Berry, criticizing the Democratic record in the state. The Democratic Henderson Gleaner was also critical, opining "We should be ashamed of ourselves." Throughout the state, Bradley hammered the issue of the blind trust afforded to the perennial Democratic officeholders, specifically calling for an examination of the treasury. Though Bradley lost the election by more than 16,000 votes, he made the best showing of any Republican gubernatorial candidate to that time and garnered strong support from the state's black voters. His concerns about the state treasury proved valid: when Buckner ordered an audit of the treasurer's books in 1888, Treasurer James "Honest Dick" Tate fled with $250,000 from the state treasury. He was never found.

In 1888, Bradley's name was again put before the General Assembly as a candidate for the U.S. Senate, but he was defeated by James B. Beck by a vote of 94–31. Later that year, he received 103 of 832 votes for the Vice-Presidential nomination at the 1888 Republican National Convention, losing the nomination to Levi P. Morton. Upon the unsolicited recommendation of Senator Beck, President Benjamin Harrison nominated Bradley as Minister to Korea in 1889, but Bradley declined the nomination, opting to remain in Kentucky and pursue future political opportunities there. He was elected to the Republican National Committee three times between 1890 and 1896. In 1896, he was the Kentucky delegation's choice for presidential nominee.

== Gubernatorial election of 1895 ==
Bradley declared his candidacy early for the Republican gubernatorial nomination in 1895, and no real challenger emerged before the Republicans' nominating convention. Consequently, Bradley was nominated in a relatively harmonious convention. The major issue of the campaign was whether the country should maintain a monetary system based on the gold standard or allow the coinage of silver at a ratio of 16 to 1, commonly called the free silver position. At their convention, the Republicans adopted a platform that was unequivocally in favor of the gold standard.

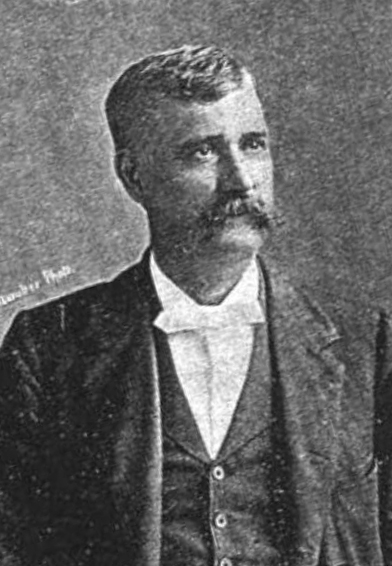
Parker Watkins Hardin, Bradley's opponent in 1895

Democrats were divided on the monetary issue. Their eventual nominee, Parker Watkins Hardin, was known to be a free silver supporter, but he pledged to abide by whatever platform the convention adopted. That platform was ambiguous with regard to the gold and silver question; it praised President Grover Cleveland and his treasury secretary, native Kentuckian John G. Carlisle, both gold supporters, and endorsed the national Democratic platform of 1892. Most believed this meant the platform favored gold, although silverites like Ollie M. James contended that the 1892 platform favored silver. Consequently, most Democrats left the convention not knowing where their nominee would stand on the money question.

The campaign opened in Louisville on August 19, 1895. In his first address, Hardin came out squarely for free silver, ensuring the division of his party for the rest of the campaign. Bradley reprised much of his argument from the 1887 campaign against Buckner. He charged mismanagement of the state government by Democrats, citing Tate's defalcation as evidence. He also stressed Hardin's association with Tate; Hardin had been the state's attorney general when Tate absconded, and the two were known to be friends. He denounced free silver and again called for a high protective tariff. He blamed Democratic President Cleveland for the national depression.

In the third debate, held in Hopkinsville, Hardin countered Bradley's offensive against him on the money issue by charging that the election of a Republican would lead to "Negro domination" of the state. This put Bradley in a dilemma. If he refused to acknowledge African-Americans' influence on the party, he would lose their votes; if he acknowledged it, he would lose many white voters. Bradley attempted to ignore the racial question in Hopkinsville and during the next two debates, instead intensifying his criticism of Hardin on the money question and his association with Tate. In the sixth joint debate, held August 30 at Eminence, some members of the audience began to heckle Bradley, who was hoarse from previous debates. After attempting to restart his opening statement four times, Bradley left the platform, and the next day announced he would not participate in any further joint debates as a result of the incident. Many believed Bradley was looking for a reason to end the debates in order to dodge the racial question, and the incident at Eminence gave him the opportunity. Some black Republicans resented Bradley's attempt to dodge the racial question and encouraged fellow African Americans not to support Bradley but vote for Populist Thomas S. Pettit instead.

In the general election, Bradley carried the vote of many Gold Democrats. He also drew a number of votes from those who sympathized with the views of the American Protective Association, an anti-immigrant, anti-Catholic organization. Some estimates placed the organization's membership at 14,000 in Louisville alone; it also had strength in the urban centers of Paducah, Lexington, Ashland, Covington, and Frankfort. Democrats were also hurt by economic factors, including the national economic problems and a severe drought in the state. Bradley was elected the first Republican governor of Kentucky, defeating Hardin by a vote of 172,436 to 163,524. Pettit, the Populist candidate, drew 16,911 votes, most of them from Democrats in western Kentucky. Turnout in the election was 85%. More votes than potential voters were registered in 18 counties, nine of which went for Bradley and nine for Hardin.

== Governor of Kentucky ==
Bradley was inaugurated December 10, 1895. During his term, Republicans controlled the Kentucky House of Representatives, while Democrats controlled the Kentucky Senate. This led to infighting between the two houses of the General Assembly and between the General Assembly and the governor. On joint votes, such as the election of U.S. Senators, the parties were even with sixty-eight members each; two Populists were also members of the Assembly, one who supported the Democrats and another who supported the Republicans.

=== Legislative session of 1896 ===
In the first legislative session of Bradley's term, 75 bills were filed, including a ban on the manufacture and sale of cigarettes, a measure to make carrying a concealed weapon a felony, and a bill banning gambling at racetracks and church fairs. Competing measures affecting pool halls were introduced – one would have lifted most of the restrictions on their operation while another would have banned them altogether. Bradley added an anti-lynching law to the legislative agenda. However, none of these bills were acted on; the vast majority of the Assembly's attention during the session was focused on the election of a U.S. Senator.

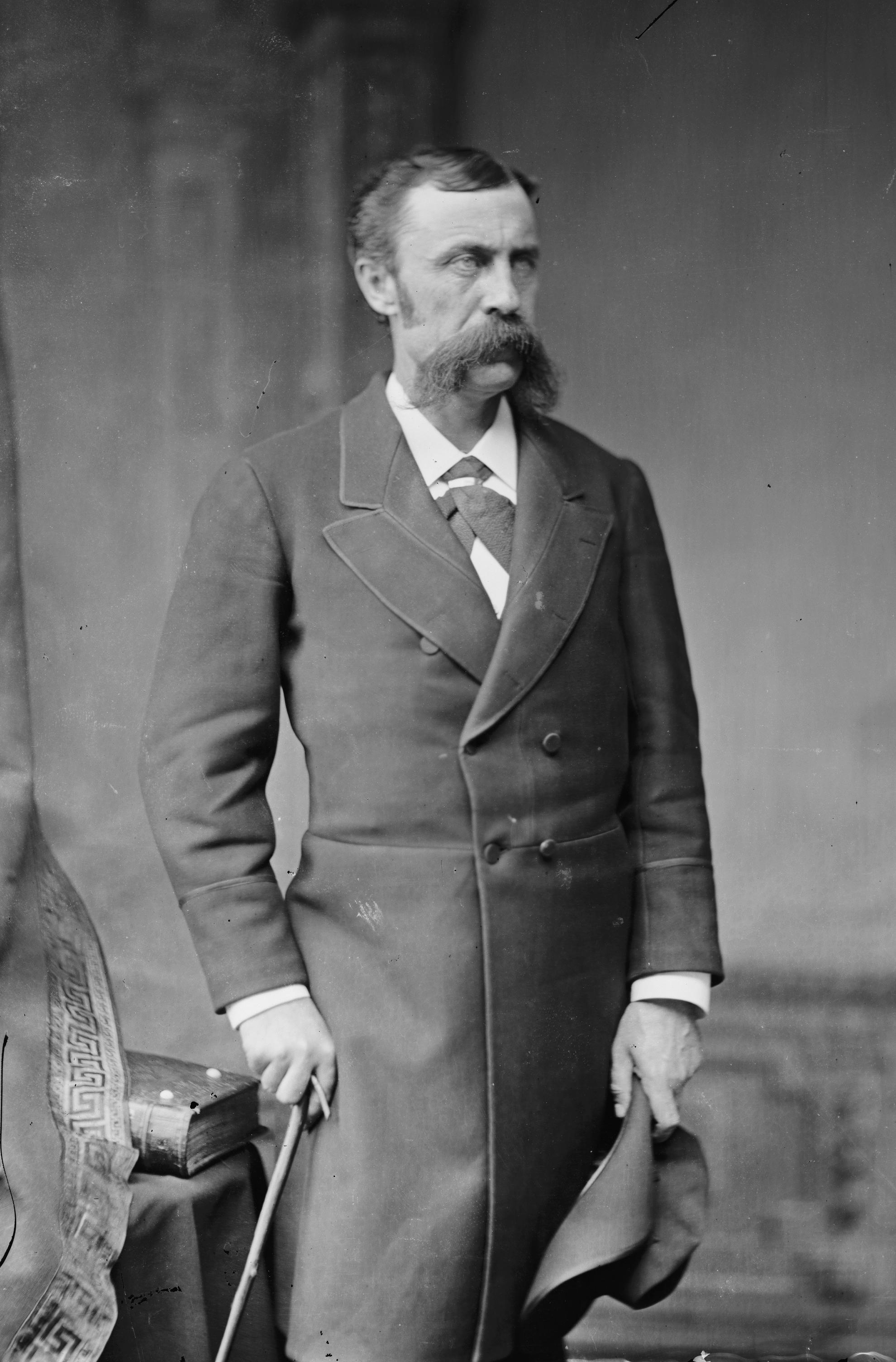
The election of a successor to Senator J. C. S. Blackburn dominated the first legislative session of Bradley's term.

Many Democrats were anxious to return Senator J. C. S. Blackburn to his seat in Congress, but some were instead supporting ex-Governor John Y. Brown. Democratic state senator Albert Berry was also making overtures about being considered for the seat. Republican legislators nominated W. Godfrey Hunter for the seat, and ultimately, Blackburn and Hunter emerged as the leading candidates. The Gold Democrats refused to back Blackburn, a free silver supporter, instead opting for ex-Governor James B. McCreary. On ballot after ballot, no candidate received a majority, though Blackburn received 65 votes once, leaving him just two votes shy of election. Treasury Secretary John G. Carlisle was put forward as a compromise candidate, but never received more than 61 votes. Other proposed compromise candidates included Louisville Courier-Journal editor Henry Watterson, congressman Walter Evans, ex-Governor Buckner, Judge William H. Holt, and Augustus E. Willson.

Free silver Democrats challenged Hunter's naturalization. It was finally concluded that Hunter, an Englishman, was naturalized under provisions of a federal law that allowed him to omit the standard preliminaries because of his service as a surgeon in the U.S. Army. Over the course of the contest, Hunter was also indicted for bribery, but was acquitted in short order for lack of evidence. Voting proceeded over several days, and demonstrators in the chamber galleries became disruptive in their support of various candidates. A Kentucky Post account from March 7, 1896, recorded that good-humored legislators began pelting each other with paper wads during the day's deliberations. This attempt at levity escalated until wrapped transcripts of the governor's message to the legislature were flying through the air. By March 11, tensions had reached the point that armed Democratic supporters were standing outside the state house in an attempt to intimidate Republican lawmakers and discourage them from entering. Attempts were made to unseat several legislators in the General Assembly, leading to threats of violence. Observers were banned from the gallery, and everyone entering the state house was searched for weapons.

Bradley called the militia to Frankfort to maintain order, and considered adjourning the session to an opera house in Louisville where more security could be provided. Some leading Democrats in Louisville lauded Bradley for preserving order, but Democratic lawmakers in the Senate sought the passage of resolutions to convict Bradley of interference with the election, fine him $500, and sentence him to six months in jail. These same legislators also threatened to imprison Lieutenant Governor William Jackson Worthington, allowing Democratic President pro tem of the Senate William Goebel to become acting governor. A committee was appointed to investigate Bradley, but the resolutions to convict and imprison him were not passed. On March 16, Governor Bradley declared martial law in the capital. The session adjourned later that day without having elected a senator. Among the session's few accomplishments were bills creating two reform houses in the state and providing for free turnpikes and gravel roads. A bill forbidding the employment of children of school age who had not attended at least twelve weeks of school during the year passed over Bradley's veto. In an effort to embarrass the governor, the Senate refused to pass a revenue bill, leaving the governor with no money to run the state. Following the session, a Northern Kentucky newspaper opined "It is hard to conceive how a legislature would go about accomplishing less than this present one has."

Bradley called a special session in March 1897 to resume the balloting for senator. He appointed Andrew T. Wood to fill the vacancy in case the legislators did not elect a senator in time for the congressional session to begin. The Republicans continued supporting Hunter, Free Silver Democrats still backed Blackburn, and Gold Democrats nominated businessman Henry L. Martin of Woodford County. When continued deadlock between Hunter and Blackburn ensued, Hunter withdrew his name from consideration. Republicans nominated St. John Boyle, but the gridlock continued unabated. After several ballots, Boyle also withdrew, and Republicans put forth lawyer and State senator William Joseph Deboe in his place. Deboe was elected on the 112th ballot, becoming the first Republican senator from the Commonwealth.

=== Advocacy for African American people ===
Bradley did much to advance the cause of African American people in Kentucky. He denounced racially motivated lynchings and demanded that county officials prosecute racial violence. He called a special legislative session in March 1897 to consider an anti-lynching bill that imposed penalties including a fine of up to $500 and removal from office for any peace officer who did not prevent a lynching or mob violence. It further empowered peace officers to recruit able-bodied men to help protect prisoners and fined them for failing to do so, if necessary. Despite the politically divided legislature, the bill quickly passed both houses of the General Assembly and Bradley signed it on May 11, 1897. In January 1898, Bradley accepted an invitation to speak before the Anti-Mob and Lynch Law Association in Springfield, Ohio. During Bradley's four-year term, twenty-five lynchings were committed in the state, down from fifty-six during the term of his predecessor.

One high-profile case that illustrated Bradley's opposition to racial violence was that of ex-slave George Dinning. After being emancipated, Dinning saved enough money to purchase a farm in Simpson County. On January 27, 1897, a mob of 25 armed white men came to Dinning's farm, accused him of stealing hogs and chickens, and demanded he leave the county within 10 days. Dinning denied being a thief and insisted several people in the county would vouch for his good character. The mob, enraged by Dinning's resistance, began firing on his house and wounded him twice. Dinning retrieved a gun from his house and fired into the mob, killing one man. The mob fled, and the next day, Dinning turned himself in to local officials. While he was in their custody, the mob returned to his farm, drove his family from their house, looted it, and razed it to the ground.

The Simpson County sheriff moved Dinning to Bowling Green and eventually to Louisville to prevent him from being lynched. Governor Bradley dispatched a squad of the state militia to protect him while his trial proceeded. Despite the fact that the case involved a black man killing a white man, most observers believed Dinning would be acquitted on grounds of self-defense. The jury, however, convicted Dinning of manslaughter and sentenced him to seven years of hard labor. Immediately, Bradley's office was flooded with requests for him to intervene on Dinning's behalf. The requests came from Black and white people, some of them ex-Confederates. Dinning's attorney, Augustus E. Willson, formally requested a pardon, and Bradley issued it 10 days after the conviction. Bradley opined that Dinning had acted reasonably under the circumstances and that it was a shame that no members of the mob were charged. After being freed, Dinning relocated to Indiana and hired ex-Confederate Bennett H. Young to file a federal lawsuit against some members of the mob that had identified themselves during his trial. The trial was held in Louisville, and Dinning was awarded $50,000 in damages.

In his address to the state legislature in January 1898, Bradley advocated the repeal of the state's Separate Coach Law, which provided separate streetcars for white and Black people. He appointed substantial numbers of African-Americans to patronage positions in government beyond the janitorial jobs they usually received. He named Edward E. Underwood as the first black person on the board of trustees for Kentucky State College (later the University of Kentucky). Because of his devotion to black advancement, Bradley was the only white person included in William Decker Johnson's 1897 compilation Biographical Sketches of Prominent Negro Men and Women of Kentucky.

=== Other matters of Bradley's term ===
The election of Republican president William McKinley in 1896 deepened the Democrats' resolve to oppose the Republican governor and his allies. Moreover, when the legislature convened in 1898, the Democratic majority in both houses was overwhelming. Bradley's message to the General Assembly in 1898 called for numerous reforms including spending cuts to reduce government waste, putting the state's charitable institutions under control of a non-partisan board, and reforms to public education and the legal system.

The legislature largely ignored the governor's message in favor of partisan concerns. A pure food and drug law was enacted without his signature. His veto of controversial legislation regulating railroad rates, however, was sustained. Both houses passed a resolution calling for the resignation of Senator William Lindsay, a Gold Democrat who did not support William Jennings Bryan's presidential bid, on grounds that he no longer represented the interests of his party. Lindsay responded that he represented the people of Kentucky and refused to resign his seat.

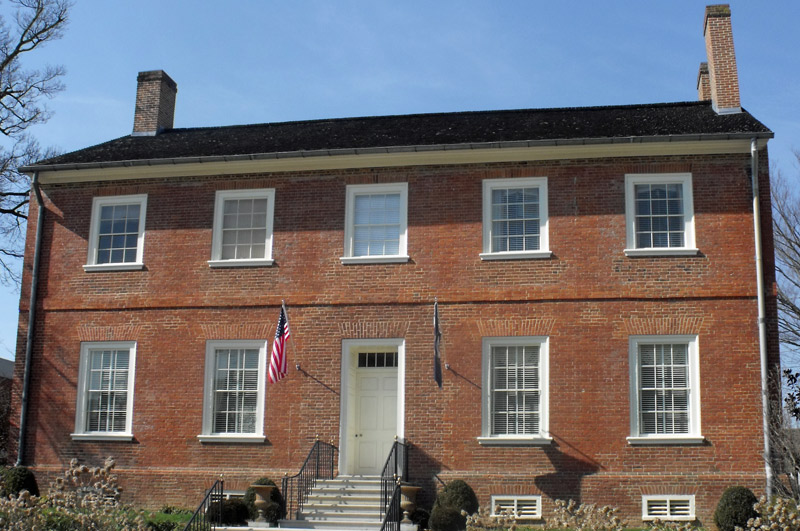
The governor's mansion was damaged by a fire during Bradley's term

Another of Bradley's concerns in his message to the legislature was the condition of the Governor's Mansion. In his address, he declared "As to the Executive Mansion, for years its floors have been propped up to prevent them from falling, and it required more than seven hundred feet of weather strips to make it comfortable in the winter. The present site is disagreeable, the view from one side overlooks the walls of the penitentiary, and from the other the smokestack of a large flouring mill nearby." Instead of addressing Bradley's concerns, the General Assembly passed a "ripper bill" taking control of the mansion from the governor and putting it under the supervision of the Court of Appeals. On February 10, 1899, the mansion caught fire as a result of a faulty flue in the governor's bedroom. The day was so cold that the firemen had difficulty keeping the water in their hoses unfrozen, and the mansion suffered extensive damage. Though the mansion was insured and a reporter for the Courier-Journal opined that the sensible thing to do would be to demolish the old structure and construct a new one or purchase another house in Frankfort to serve as the governor's mansion, the legislature was disinclined to make more than minimal accommodations for a Republican governor. Consequently, the mansion was once again repaired. The Bradleys stayed with a neighbor in Frankfort immediately after the fire. Thereafter, Governor Bradley stayed in Frankfort's Capitol Hotel, while Mrs. Bradley and daughter Christine returned to the family's home in Lancaster. The family re-occupied the residence prior to the end of Bradley's term.

Bradley struggled to end violent feuds that continued in the eastern part of the state. During his term, the so-called "Tollgate Wars" were ongoing. In many rural areas that could not afford to build good roads, private companies had built the roads and attempted to recover the costs and turn a profit by charging tolls. Poor residents of the areas, however, maintained that the tolls were excessive, especially in light of the national depression. They began to call for "free roads", but their calls went unheeded by the state and national governments. Many then resorted to violence, burning toll houses and threatening and attacking toll collectors. Bradley called for harsh action against this lawlessness, but the Democratic General Assembly, sympathetic to the plight of the poor residents of the state, refused to act. By the end of Bradley's term, most of the violence had ended, as companies sold their stock to local groups or simply abandoned their roads due to the violence.

Kentucky's four infantry regiments and two cavalry units that served in the Spanish–American War were beset by poor sanitation and disease in the army camps where they were stationed. The units saw little action in the war, but 84 men died as a result of the poor conditions. When the time came for the troops to return home, Bradley found that the state had no money to pay for the hospital trains needed for their trip. Bradley personally borrowed money from a bank to secure their passage, and trusted that the General Assembly would reimburse him.

=== Goebel Election Law; gubernatorial election of 1899 ===
On February 1, 1898, Senate President Pro Tem William Goebel sponsored a measure later referred to as the Goebel Election Law. The bill created a Board of Election Commissioners, appointed by the General Assembly, who were responsible for choosing election commissioners in all of Kentucky's counties. The board was empowered to examine election returns and rule on the results. The power to decide the outcome of disputed elections remained with the General Assembly, pursuant to Section 153 of the state constitution. Because the General Assembly was heavily Democratic and Goebel was considered a likely Democratic aspirant for the governorship in the 1899 election, the bill was attacked as blatantly partisan and self-serving, even by some Democrats. Nevertheless, Goebel was able to hold enough members of his party together to override Bradley's veto, making the bill law.

A proposal was made to call a special session to repeal the law, and Bradley was in favor of the action, but a poll of the legislators showed that too many of them were noncommittal to justify the call. Republicans organized a test case against the law, but the Kentucky Court of Appeals found it constitutional. As leader of the party, Goebel essentially hand-picked the members of the Election Commission. He chose three staunch Democrats – W. S. Pryor, former chief justice of the Kentucky Court of Appeals; W. T. Ellis, former U. S. Representative from Daviess County; and C. B. Poyntz, former head of the state railroad commission.

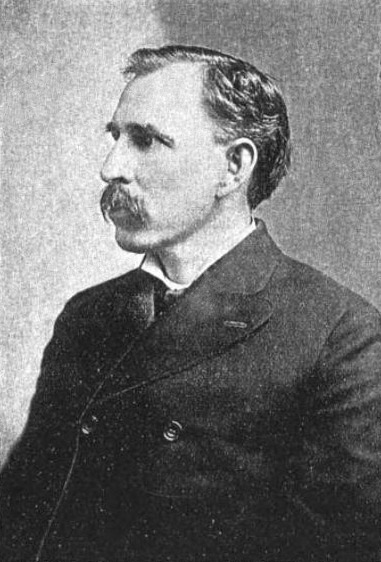
William S. Taylor was the Republican nominee to succeed Bradley.

As Bradley's term drew to a close, potential Republican candidates to succeed him were initially few. Some saw Kentucky's 18,000-vote plurality for William Jennings Bryan in the 1896 presidential election as a sure sign that the state would vote Democratic in 1899. Others were not interested in being on the defensive against the inevitable Democratic attacks on Bradley's administration. Still others were intimidated by the prospect of being defeated by the machinery of the Goebel Election Law. Sitting attorney general William S. Taylor was the first to announce his candidacy and soon secured the support of Senator Deboe. Later candidates included Hopkins County judge Clifton J. Pratt and sitting state auditor Sam H. Stone. The former was Bradley's choice, but Taylor was a skilled political organizer and was able to create a strong political machine amongst the county delegations. He seemed the favorite to win the nomination.

The Republican nominating convention convened on July 12 in Lexington. Angry that his party had not more seriously considered his candidate, Bradley did not attend. Black leaders in the party threatened to follow Bradley and organize their own nominating convention, as they believed Taylor represented the "lily-white" branch of the party. Taylor attempted to hold the party together by making one of the black leaders permanent secretary of the convention and promising to appoint other black leaders to his cabinet if elected. He also tried to bring Bradley back to the convention by promising to nominate Bradley's nephew, Edwin P. Morrow, for secretary of state. Bradley refused the offer. In the face of Taylor's superior organization, all the other candidates withdrew in a show of party unity, allowing Taylor to be nominated unanimously.

Bradley had initially been cool toward Taylor, but he agreed to tour the state with Republican leader Augustus E. Willson after Goebel, the eventual Democratic nominee, made a similar tour with William Jennings Bryan, who was wildly popular in the state. Although he insisted he only wanted to defend his administration from Democratic attacks, Henry Watterson suggested that Bradley was seeking to enlist Taylor's support for his anticipated senatorial bid. Bradley began his tour of the state in Louisville, charging that Democrats had to import an orator for their candidate because all of the state's best men had deserted him. He also encouraged African American people not to desert the Republican Party. He contrasted his appointments of African American people to his cabinet with the Democrats' support of the Separate Coach Bill. Throughout his speech, Bradley defended his administration and never once mentioned Taylor. Finally, he closed with the line "And go to the polls and elect Taylor!" As Bradley exited the stage, Willson whispered to him, "Bradley, that's the slickest thing you ever did in your life." As they continued to tour the state, Bradley and Willson often drew crowds larger than those assembled for Taylor.

As the campaign drew to a close, both Republicans and Democrats warned of the possibility that electoral fraud and violence would be perpetrated by the other side. Louisville mayor Charles P. Weaver, a Goebel Democrat, added 500 men to the city's police force just before the election, leading to charges that voter intimidation would occur in that city. Bradley countered by ordering the state militia to be ready to quell any disturbances across the state. On election day, the headline of the Courier-Journal proclaimed "Bayonet Rule".

For all the claims about the potential for violence, election day, November 7, remained mostly calm across the state. Fewer than a dozen people were arrested statewide. Voting returns were slow, and on election night, the race was still too close to call. When the official tally was announced, Taylor had won by a vote of 193,714 to 191,331. Former governor John Y. Brown, nominated by a dissident group of Democrats, had garnered 12,040 votes, and Populist candidate John G. Blair had captured 2,936. Though the Board of Elections was thought to be controlled by Goebel, it rendered a surprise 2–1 decision to certify the election results. The board's majority opinion claimed that they did not have any judicial power and were thus unable to hear proof or swear witnesses, leaving them without grounds to invalidate any votes. Taylor was inaugurated on December 12, 1899.

Following his term as governor, Bradley moved to Louisville and resumed his legal practice. Shortly after Bradley left office, Goebel and his running mate, J. C. W. Beckham, challenged the results of the 1899 election in the General Assembly, per the state constitution. All the candidates for the state's minor offices contested as well. Bradley and his colleague Augustus Willson formed part of the legal team that represented the Republicans before the General Assembly and in court, where they challenged the legality of the Goebel Election Law and, later, the actions of the General Assembly's contest committee.

Republicans around the state expected the General Assembly's contest committee to recommend disqualification of enough ballots to make Goebel governor. Armed men from eastern Kentucky filled the capital, awaiting the contest committee's findings. On the morning of January 30, as Goebel and two friends walked toward the capitol building, a shot rang out, and Goebel fell wounded. He was taken to a nearby hotel to be treated for his wounds. As expected, the contest committee recommended invalidating enough votes to make Goebel governor, and the General Assembly voted to certify the recommendation. Goebel was sworn in as governor, but he died on February 3. Beckham then took the oath of office and continued the legal challenge against Taylor and his lieutenant governor, John Marshall.

In federal court, Bradley argued on behalf of the Republican minor officers that the Goebel Election Law deprived citizens of their right to vote. The right to vote, he claimed, was inherent in the Fourteenth Amendment's guarantee of "liberty", and could not be taken from any citizen without due process. Federal judge William Howard Taft ruled that the Republicans would have to seek remedy in the state courts. After a protracted legal battle, all of the minor officers were unseated except Attorney General Clifton J. Pratt.

The cases of Taylor and Marshall were appealed to the Kentucky Court of Appeals, then to the Supreme Court of the United States. In the case of Taylor v. Beckham, Bradley countered Democrats' claims that the federal courts should not have jurisdiction by citing Thayer v. Boyd, a similar case in which the court had assumed jurisdiction. He further quoted authorities who opined that an elected office was property, using this to contend that Taylor's rights under the Fourteenth Amendment had been violated, thus giving the court jurisdiction. Also, Bradley asserted, the election of some members of the General Assembly's contest committee would hinge on the decision of that very committee. At least one member of the committee was known to have wagered on the election's outcome. These facts should have nullified the decision of the committee and the Assembly on the grounds that it had left some members as judges of their own cases, Bradley argued. Finally, Bradley cited irregularities in the proceedings of the contest committee, including giving insufficient time for the review of testimony provided in written form by Taylor and Marshall's legal representation. The court refused to intervene in the case, however, because it found that there were no federal questions involved. The lone justice dissenting from that opinion was Kentuckian John Marshall Harlan.

== Later life and death ==
On a joint ballot of the General Assembly in 1900, Bradley was defeated for a seat in the U.S. Senate by a vote of 75–54. After the unseating of Taylor, the state Republican party split into factions, with Godfrey Hunter at the head of one and Bradley at the head of the other. The two factions formed a tentative alliance to nominate Danville law professor John W. Yerkes in the special election called after Goebel's assassination, but Yerkes lost to Democratic nominee J. C. W. Beckham. At the 1904 Republican National Convention, Bradley was chosen to second the nomination of Theodore Roosevelt for president.

Factionalism again marked the Republican nominating convention in 1904. Bradley and his faction backed Augustus E. Willson for governor, while Hunter and Yerkes favored Louisville businessman Morris B. Belknap, the son-in-law of former governor Simon Buckner. When convention officials ruled against a county delegation committed to Willson, he withdrew from the contest. Bradley was angered as Belknap was nominated on the first ballot and subsequently lost to J. C. W. Beckham, who was allowed to seek a second term because a court ruled he had not been elected to a full term in 1900.

=== Career in the Senate ===
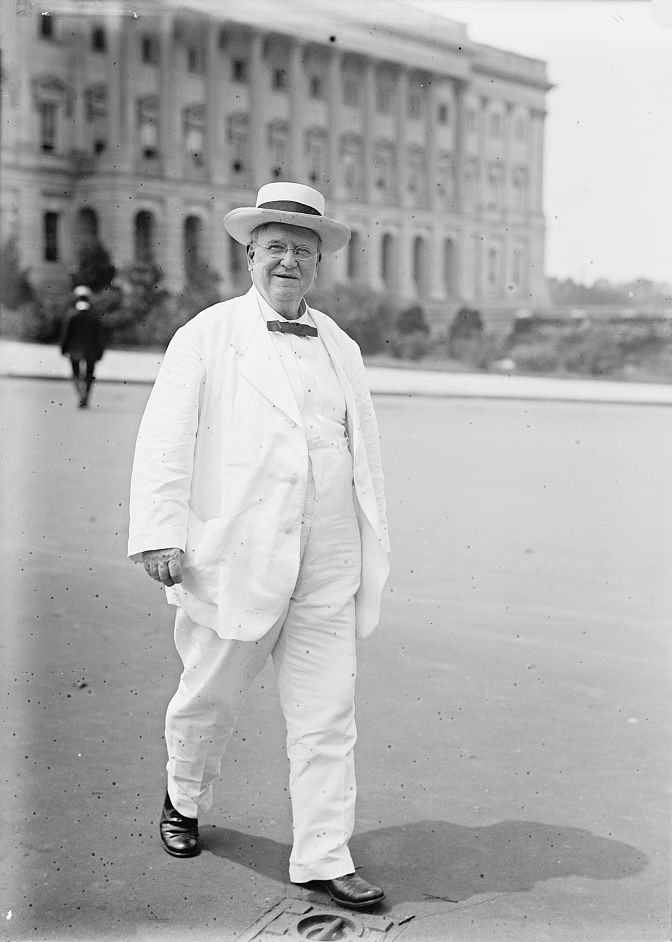
Bradley as a senator in 1913

In 1907, Republicans nominated Willson for governor, and he was elected. This victory again emboldened Republicans in the General Assembly, who nominated Bradley for a seat in the U.S. Senate in 1908. The Democrats countered by nominating outgoing Governor Beckham. Though the Democrats had a majority in the General Assembly, seven Democratic legislators refused to vote for Beckham because he favored Prohibition. Instead, they voted for other candidates, leaving no one with a majority. As balloting continued over the course of two months with no winner, some Democrats urged Beckham to withdraw in favor of a more palatable candidate. He refused, and after twenty-nine ballots, four Democrats who favored Bradley's "wet" position defied allegiance to their party, electing him by a 64–60 margin. None of the four were re-elected to their seats in the legislature, though one eventually became Bradley's private secretary.

During the Sixty-first and Sixty-second Congresses, Bradley was chairman of the U.S. Senate Committee on Expenditures in the Department of Justice. He was also chairman of the committee to Investigate Trespassers upon Indian Land during the Sixty-first Congress, and the chairman of the Committee on Revolutionary Claims during the Sixty-third Congress. Historian James C. Klotter opined that during Bradley's career in the Senate, he was "better known for his oratory than for his legislative accomplishments". He disappointed African-Americans by supporting the Taft administration's policy of not appointing African American people to patronage positions in the states where they resided.

In the 1908 presidential election, Bradley supported Charles W. Fairbanks for the Republican nomination, while Willson favored William Howard Taft. Disharmony marred the state nominating convention, and despite being a newly minted senator, Bradley was not chosen as a delegate to the Republican National Convention. This infuriated Bradley and ended his alliance with Willson. In the 1911 Republican nominating convention, Bradley did not support Edward C. O'Rear, the party's eventual gubernatorial nominee. He did little to support O'Rear in the general election, and former governor James B. McCreary was elected.

On May 14, 1914, Bradley announced his intent to retire from politics upon the completion of his term, owing to the decline of his general health. Hurrying to board a streetcar following his announcement, Bradley suffered a serious fall, sustaining two broken fingers, head trauma, and internal injuries. After briefly attempting to return to his duties, he became bedfast, and died on May 23, 1914. His official cause of death was listed as uraemia. Upon Bradley's death, both houses of Congress passed resolutions expressing their sympathy, and promptly adjourned out of respect. His body was returned to Frankfort for burial, but in accordance with the wishes of Bradley and his family, did not lie in state. He was buried in the state cemetery in Frankfort.

== See also ==
- List of members of the United States Congress who died in office (1900–1949)

Party political offices
Preceded by Thomas Z. Morrow	Republican nominee for Governor of Kentucky; 1887	Succeeded by Andrew T. Wood
Preceded by Andrew T. Wood	Republican nominee for Governor of Kentucky; 1895	Succeeded by William S. Taylor
Political offices
Preceded by John Y. Brown	Governor of Kentucky; 1895–1899	Succeeded by William S. Taylor
U.S. Senate
Preceded by James B. McCreary	United States Senator (Class 3) from Kentucky; 1909–1914	Succeeded by Johnson N. Camden Jr.
