= 1887 Kentucky gubernatorial election =

- August 1, 1887
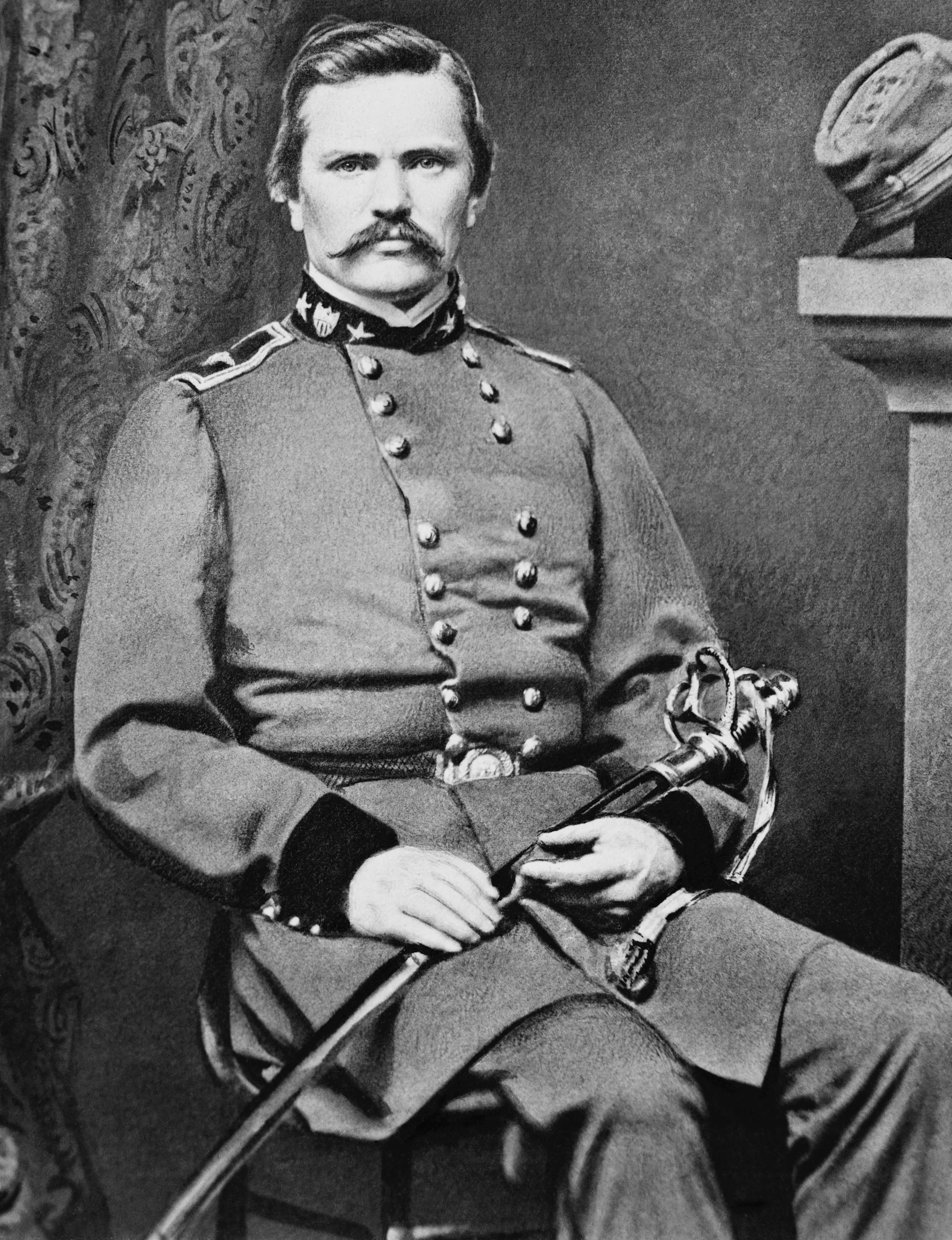

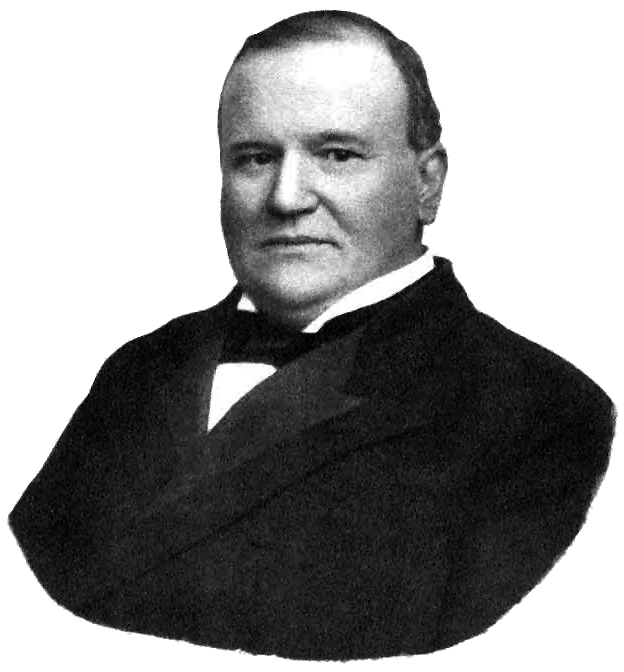
Nominee	Simon Bolivar Buckner	William O'Connell Bradley
Party	Democratic	Republican
Popular vote	143,270	126,473
Percentage	50.70%	44.76%
- County results Buckner: 40–50% 50–60% 60–70% 70–80% Bradley: 40–50% 50–60% 60–70% 70–80% 80–90% Cardin: 30–40%
Governor before election
J. Proctor Knott
Democratic
Elected Governor
Simon Bolivar Buckner
Democratic

The 1887 Kentucky gubernatorial election was held on August 1, 1887. Democratic nominee Simon Bolivar Buckner defeated Republican nominee William O'Connell Bradley with 50.70% of the vote.

== General election ==
=== Candidates ===
Major party candidates

- Simon Bolivar Buckner, Democratic
- William O'Connell Bradley, Republican

Other candidates

- Fontaine T. Fox, Prohibition
- A. H. Cardin, Union Labor

=== Results ===
1887 Kentucky gubernatorial election
Party	Candidate	Votes	%	±%
Democratic	Simon Bolivar Buckner	143,270	50.70%	−9.27%
Republican	William O'Connell Bradley	126,473	44.76%	+4.73%
Prohibition	Fontaine T. Fox	8,394	2.97%	N/A
Independent	A. H. Cardin	4,434	1.57%	N/A
Majority		28,081	5.94%	
Turnout				
Democratic hold		Swing		
