= Evanston, Kentucky =

Unincorporated community in Kentucky, United States

Coordinates: 37°32′30.73″N 83°1′53.53″W

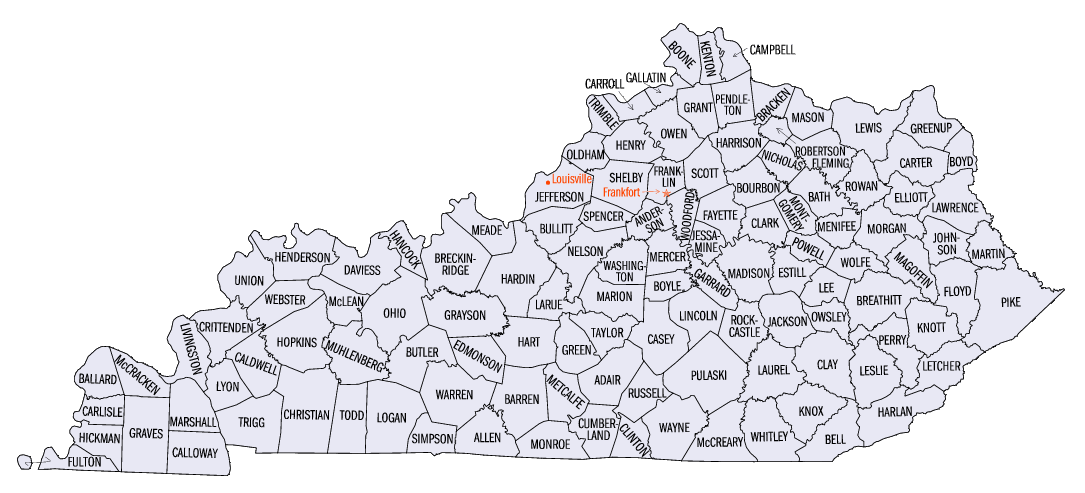
Kentucky

Evanston (also called Evanson) is an unincorporated settlement in Breathitt County, Kentucky. Established in 1950, it was named for Everett J. Evans.

The settlement was managed by the Pond Creek Pocahontas Company, which established a coal mine in the same year. It was later taken over by the Island Creek Coal Company which operated coal mines in the area. The coal-producing area was once known as the Tiptop triangle.
