= 1895 Kentucky gubernatorial election =

- November 5, 1895
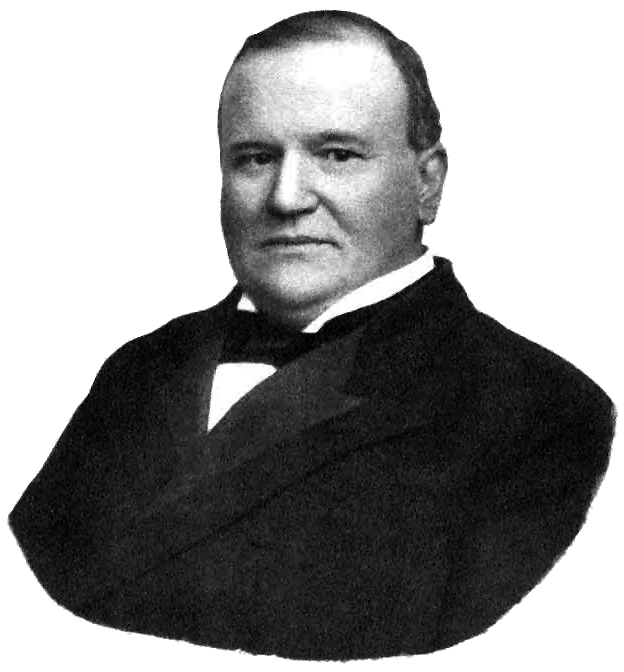

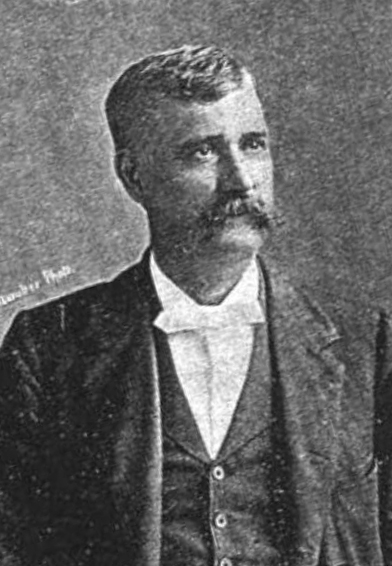
Nominee	William O'Connell Bradley	Parker Watkins Hardin
Party	Republican	Democratic
Popular vote	172,436	163,524
Percentage	48.29%	45.80%
- Bradley: 40–50% 50–60% 60–70% 70–80% 80–90% >90% Hardin: 40–50% 50–60% 60–70% 70–80%
Governor before election
John Y. Brown
Democratic
Elected Governor
William O'Connell Bradley
Republican

The 1895 Kentucky gubernatorial election was held on November 5, 1895. Republican nominee William O'Connell Bradley defeated Democratic nominee Parker Watkins Hardin with 48.29% of the vote.

== General election ==
=== Candidates ===
Major party candidates

- William O'Connell Bradley, Republican
- Parker Watkins Hardin, Democratic

Other candidates

- Thomas S. Petit, People's
- T.P. Demaree, Prohibition

=== Results ===
1895 Kentucky gubernatorial election
Party	Candidate	Votes	%	±%
Republican	William O'Connell Bradley	172,436	48.29%	+8.15%
Democratic	Parker Watkins Hardin	163,524	45.80%	−4.05%
Populist	Thomas S. Pettit	16,911	4.74%	−4.12%
Prohibition	T.P. Demaree	4,186	1.17%	+0.03%
Majority		8,912	2.49%	
Turnout				
Republican gain from Democratic		Swing		
