= Alexander B. Montgomery =

American politician

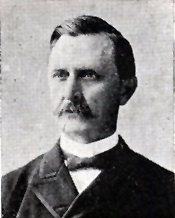

Member of the U.S. House of Representatives from Kentucky's 4th district
- In office March 4, 1887 – March 3, 1895
- Preceded by: Thomas A. Robertson
- Succeeded by: John W. Lewis

Member of the Kentucky Senate from the 12th district
- In office August 6, 1877 – August 1, 1881
- Preceded by: James W. Hays
- Succeeded by: Wilhite Carpenter

Personal details
- Born: Alexander Brooks Montgomery; December 11, 1837 near Tip Top, Kentucky, U.S.
- Died: December 27, 1910 (aged 73) Elizabethtown, Kentucky, U.S.
- Resting place: City Cemetery
- Party: Democratic
- Education: Georgetown College; University of Louisville School of Law
- Profession: Politician, lawyer

Alexander Brooks Montgomery (December 11, 1837 – December 27, 1910) was a U.S. representative from Kentucky.

Born near Tip Top, Kentucky, Montgomery attended the common and private schools. He graduated from Georgetown College in 1859 and from the Louisville Law School in 1861. He engaged in agricultural pursuits in Hardin County, Kentucky from 1861 to 1870. He was admitted to the bar and commenced the practice of law in Elizabethtown, Kentucky, in 1870. He was county judge of Hardin County from 1870 to 1874. He served as member of the Kentucky Senate from 1877 to 1881.

Montgomery was elected as a Democrat to the Fiftieth and to the three succeeding Congresses (March 4, 1887 – March 3, 1895). He served as chairman of the Committee on Expenditures in the Department of War (Fifty-second and Fifty-third Congresses). He was an unsuccessful candidate for re-election to the Fifty-fourth Congress. He served as member of the Dawes Indian Commission, appointed under an act of Congress to negotiate with the Five Civilized Tribes from 1895 to 1898. He resumed the practice of law at Elizabethtown, Kentucky, where he died December 27, 1910. He was interred in City Cemetery.

U.S. House of Representatives
Preceded by Thomas A. Robertson	Member of the U.S. House of Representatives from Kentucky's 4th congressional district March 4, 1887 – March 3, 1895	Succeeded by John W. Lewis
