= Pettit, Kentucky =

Unincorporated community in Kentucky, United States

Pettit
- Unincorporated community
- Location within the state of Kentucky Pettit (the United States)
- Coordinates: 37°41′20″N 87°7′55″W
- Country: United States
- State: Kentucky
- County: Daviess
- Elevation: 387 ft (118 m)
- Time zone: UTC-6 (Central (CST))
  - Summer (DST): UTC-5 (CST)
- GNIS feature ID: 500485

Pettit is an unincorporated community in Daviess County, Kentucky, United States, named for Thomas S. Pettit, the long-time publisher of The Monitor (now the Messenger-Inquirer), who helped clear and improve the land that the community now occupies.
