= 1883 Kentucky gubernatorial election =

- August 3, 1883
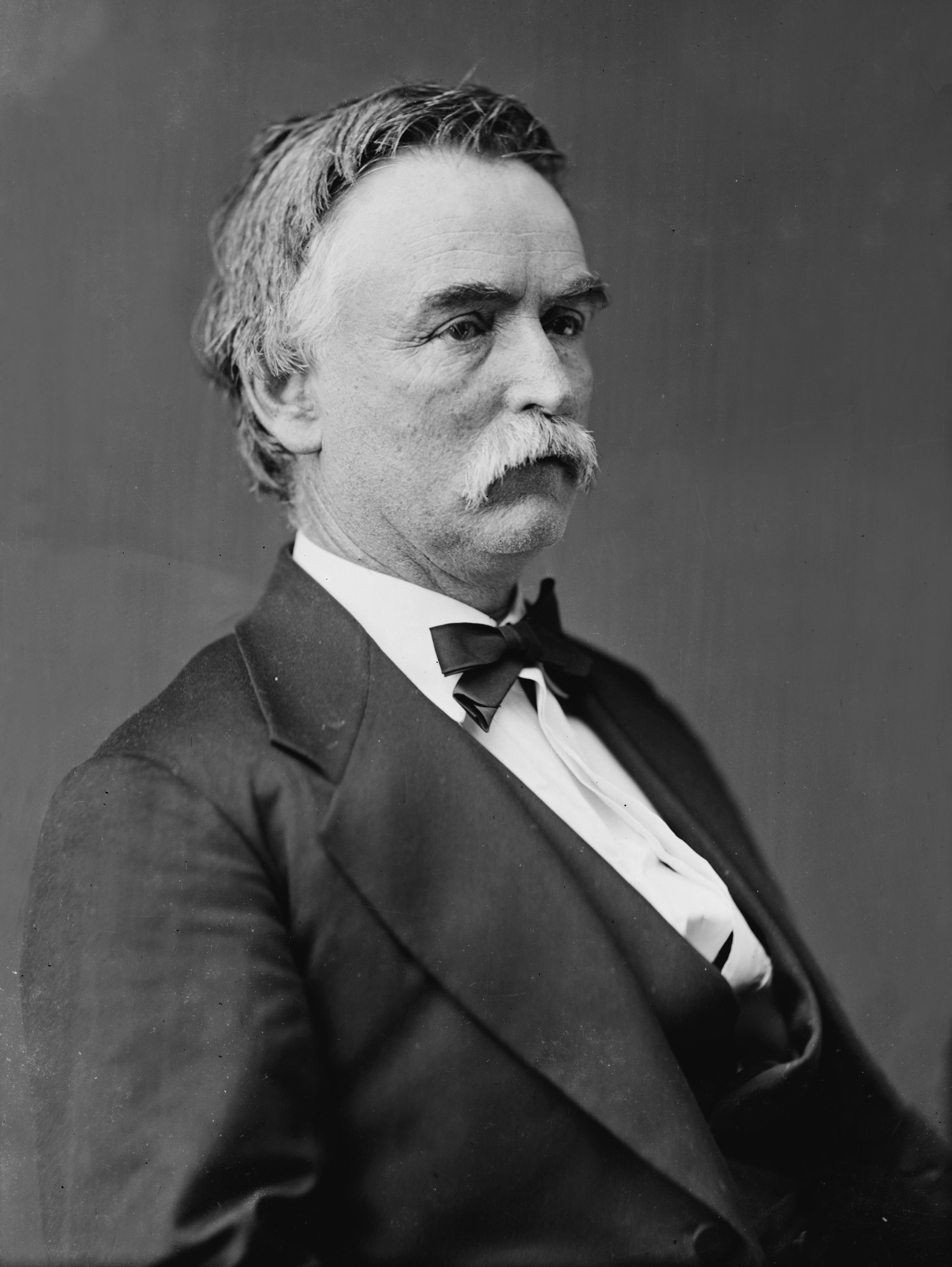

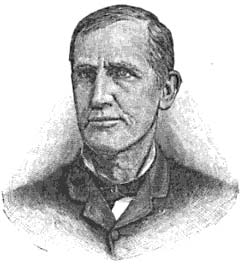
| Nominee | J. Proctor Knott | Thomas Z. Morrow |
| Party | Democratic | Republican |
| Popular vote | 133,615 | 89,181 |
| Percentage | 59.97% | 40.03% |
- County results Knott: 50–60% 60–70% 70–80% 80–90% >90% Morrow: 50–60% 60–70% 70–80% 80–90%
Governor before election
Luke P. Blackburn
Democratic
Elected Governor
J. Proctor Knott
Democratic

The 1883 Kentucky gubernatorial election was held on August 3, 1883. Democratic nominee J. Proctor Knott defeated Republican nominee Thomas Z. Morrow with 59.97% of the vote.

== General election ==
=== Candidates ===
- J. Proctor Knott, Democratic
- Thomas Z. Morrow, Republican

=== Results ===
1883 Kentucky gubernatorial election
| Party | Candidate | Votes | % | ±% |
|---|---|---|---|---|
| Democratic | J. Proctor Knott | 133,615 | 59.97% | +4.54% |
| Republican | Thomas Z. Morrow | 89,181 | 40.03% | +3.84% |
| Majority | | 44,434 | 19.94% | |
| Turnout | | | | |
| Democratic hold | | Swing | | |
