= Thomas Z. Morrow =

American politician (1836–1913)

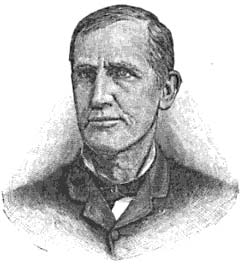

Judge of the 8th Kentucky Circuit Court
- In office 1886–1903

Member of the Kentucky Senate from the 17th district
- In office August 7, 1865 – May 1866
- Preceded by: Cyrenius Wait
- Succeeded by: John W. F. Parker

Member of the Kentucky House of Representatives from Pulaski County
- In office August 5, 1861 – August 3, 1863
- Preceded by: John Griffin
- Succeeded by: M. E. Ingram

Personal details
- Born: Thomas Zanzinger Morrow; September 3, 1836 Boyle County, Kentucky, US
- Died: August 25, 1913 (aged 76) Somerset, Kentucky, US
- Resting place: Somerset Cemetery; Somerset, Kentucky, US
- Party: Republican
- Spouse: Virginia Catherine Bradley
- Relations: Brother-in-law of William O. Bradley
- Children: Edwin P. Morrow
- Education: Centre College; Transylvania University
- Occupation: Lawyer

Military service
- Allegiance: United States of America
- Branch/service: (United States) Union Army
- Years of service: 1862–1863
- Rank: Lieutenant colonel
- Unit: 32nd Kentucky Infantry
- Battles/wars: American Civil War

Thomas Zanzinger^{[a]} Morrow (September 3, 1836 – August 25, 1913) was a lawyer, judge, and politician from Kentucky. He was one of twenty-eight men who founded the Kentucky Republican Party. His brother-in-law, William O. Bradley, was elected governor of Kentucky in 1895, and his son, Edwin P. Morrow was elected to that same office in 1919.

Morrow actively campaigned for Abraham Lincoln for president in 1860, and served in both houses of the Kentucky General Assembly. During the Civil War, he raised and commanded the 32nd Kentucky Infantry Regiment of the Union Army, which was in active service from 1862 to 1863. After the war, he remained active with the Republican Party, and was its nominee for governor in 1883, losing to J. Proctor Knott. He served seventeen years as a circuit court judge for Kentucky's 8th circuit. He died August 25, 1913, after a long illness.

== Early life ==
Thomas Morrow was born in Boyle County, Kentucky, on September 3, 1836. He was one of six children born to Alexander S. and Margaret (Boyd) Morrow. His paternal grandparents emigrated from Scotland to Pennsylvania before the Revolutionary War.

Alexander Morrow relocated to Paris, Kentucky, before coming to Flemingsburg. In 1848, the family moved to Danville, Kentucky, where Alexander found work as a merchant and hotel keeper. Thomas Morrow matriculated to Centre College and graduated in 1855. Among his fellow graduates that year were future Missouri governor Thomas Theodore Crittenden, future Kentucky governor John Y. Brown, and future Kentucky congressman William Campbell Preston Breckinridge. Morrow then enrolled in the law school at Transylvania University, graduating in 1856.

Following graduation, Morrow taught school for six months in Milledgeville, Kentucky in Lincoln County. In 1857, he moved to Somerset, Kentucky, where he became the editor of a Democratic newspaper for one year. After this, he opened his law practice, partnering with Joshua Fry Bell. In 1858, he was elected county attorney of Pulaski County; he served until his resignation in 1861.

Morrow married Catherine Virginia Bradley on December 24, 1858. Bradley was a sister to William O. Bradley, who was elected the first Republican governor of Kentucky in 1895 and later served as a U. S. Senator. The couple had eight children—7 boys and 1 girl. Their youngest children were twin boys; one of these was Edwin P. Morrow, who was elected governor of Kentucky in 1919.

== Civil War ==
Morrow supported the Union cause during the Civil War. He was one of twenty-eight men who founded the Kentucky Republican Party, and he actively campaigned for Abraham Lincoln during the 1860 presidential election. He was elected to the Kentucky House of Representatives in 1861 and served until 1863.

Morrow helped recruit part of the 32nd Kentucky Infantry for the Union Army, though three of his brothers enlisted in the Confederate Army. The unit went into service on October 28, 1862, with Morrow as its lieutenant colonel. They saw action at the Battle of Stanford among other engagements. Morrow mustered out at Danville, Kentucky, on August 12, 1863.

== Later political career ==
Elected to the Kentucky Senate in 1865, Morrow resigned the following year to accept an appointment as U.S. Assessor of Internal Revenue for the Eighth Collection District. He served in that capacity until 1869, and in 1870, he removed to Topeka, Kansas, and lived there for fourteen months before returning to Somerset and resuming his legal practice. He was a delegate and presidential elector to the Republican National Convention in 1876, and an alternate elector in 1880.

At the Republican state convention in Lexington, held May 23, 1883, Morrow was chosen as the Republican nominee for governor of Kentucky. His opponent was popular six-term congressman J. Proctor Knott. Morrow charged that the Democrats had, since the end of the Civil War, squandered the state's money and accomplished little. He cited as evidence that in 1865, the state's debt was $6 million and the state sinking fund contained $9 million in resources, but by 1883, the sinking fund was exhausted with the state debt still standing at $400,000. He also attacked outgoing Democratic governor Luke P. Blackburn for his liberal use of executive clemency. Morrow was no match for Knott's oratory nor the scathing press of Louisville Courier-Journal editor Henry Watterson. Knott won the election by a vote of 133,615 to 89,181.

In 1884, Morrow served as chair of the Republican State Central Committee. He was elected circuit court judge for Kentucky's 8th circuit in 1886, winning by a margin of 862 votes. He retained this position for seventeen years. Also in 1886, he was chosen division commander of the C. A. Zachary post of the Grand Army of the Republic in Somerset. He was a charter member of the First Presbyterian Church of Somerset and was an elder there for many years. He was also a member of the Somerset Elks Lodge and a charter member of the Somerset Odd Fellows Lodge.

In 1908, the city of Somerset erected a park and fountain in the public square and added bronze plaques on pedestals surrounding the fountain to honor citizens who contributed to Pulaski County's development; one of these plaques is dedicated to Morrow. Morrow died at the home of his son, W. Boyd Morrow, on August 25, 1913, after a long illness. He was buried in the city cemetery in Somerset.

== Footnotes ==
- ^[a]Some sources give the name as "Zantzinger".

== Sources ==
- Harrison, Lowell H.; James C. Klotter (1997). A New History of Kentucky. University Press of Kentucky. ISBN 0-8131-2008-X.
- Jillson, Willard Rouse (1921). Edwin P. Morrow – Kentuckian. C.T. Dearing Printing Company.
- "Obituary". The State Journal. 1913-08-26.
- Perrin, William Henry; J. H. Battle; G. C. Kniffin (1888). Kentucky, a history of the state. F. A. Battey.
- Smith, Zachariah Frederick (1886). The history of Kentucky: From its earliest discovery and settlement, to the present date. Courier-journal job printing company.
- Speed, Thomas; Alfred Pirtle; Robert Morrow Kelly (1897). The Union Regiments of Kentucky. Courier-journal job Print. Co.
- Tapp, Hambleton; James C. Klotter (1977). Kentucky: Decades of Discord, 1865–1900. The University Press of Kentucky. ISBN 0-916968-05-7.
- Tibbals, Alma Owens, ed. (1952). A History of Pulaski County, Kentucky. The Franklin Press.
- Ward, William H. (1886). Records of members of the Grand army of the republic. H. S. Crocker & co.

Party political offices
Preceded by Walter Evans	Republican nominee for Governor of Kentucky; 1883	Succeeded by William O'Connell Bradley
