= Pettitt =

Pettitt is an English surname of Hiberno-Norman origin. Variant spellings include Pettit and Petitt. People with the surname include:

- B. Montgomery Pettitt, American academic
- Dave Pettitt (born 1972), Canadian voice actor
- Ellen Pettitt (born 1986), Australian high jumper
- Florence Louise Pettitt (1918–2006), American opera conductor
- Garth Pettitt (1932–1992), English civil servant
- Henry Pettitt (1848–1893), British actor and dramatist
- John (Ian) Pettitt (1910–1977), Australian politician
- Peggy Pettitt (born 1950), American actress and playwright
- Tom Pettitt (1859–1946), American real tennis player

== See also ==
- Pettitt v Pettitt, a 1970 leading English trusts law case
- Andy Pettitte (born 1972), American baseball pitcher
