= John W. Lewis =

American politician

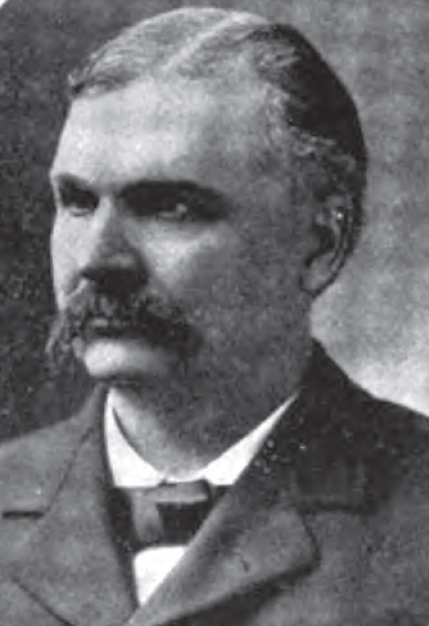

Member of the U.S. House of Representatives from Kentucky's 4th district
- In office March 4, 1895 – March 3, 1897
- Preceded by: Alexander B. Montgomery
- Succeeded by: David Highbaugh Smith

Personal details
- Born: October 14, 1841 Green County, Kentucky, U.S.
- Died: December 20, 1913 (aged 72) Fort Worth, Texas, U.S.
- Resting place: Lebanon Cemetery
- Party: Republican
- Education: Centre College
- Profession: Lawyer

John William Lewis (October 14, 1841 – December 20, 1913) was a U.S. representative from Kentucky.

Born near Greensburg, Kentucky, Lewis attended the common schools. He was graduated from Centre College, Danville, Kentucky, in 1862. He studied law. He was admitted to the bar in 1863 and practiced in Greensburg, Kentucky. He moved to Springfield, Kentucky, January 1, 1869. He was named temporary chairman of the Republican State convention on April 10, 1880. He served as delegate to the Republican National Conventions in 1880, 1884, 1888 and 1904. He served as delegate to the State constitutional convention of Kentucky in 1890 and was unseated upon a contest. He served as member of the Republican State central committee of Kentucky 1878-1891 and chairman in the State campaign of 1887. He served as special judge in the circuit courts of Marion, Taylor, and other counties.

Lewis was elected as a Republican to the Fifty-fourth Congress (March 4, 1895 – March 3, 1897). He was an unsuccessful candidate for reelection in 1896 to the Fifty-fifth Congress. He served as chairman of the congressional convention of his district in 1904 and 1908. He resumed the practice of his profession in Springfield, Kentucky. He died in Fort Worth, Texas, December 20, 1913. He was interred in Lebanon Cemetery, Lebanon, Kentucky.

U.S. House of Representatives
Preceded by Alexander B. Montgomery	Member of the U.S. House of Representatives from Kentucky's 4th congressional district March 4, 1895 – March 3, 1897	Succeeded by David H. Smith
