= George Dinning =

American former slave (c. 1857–1930)

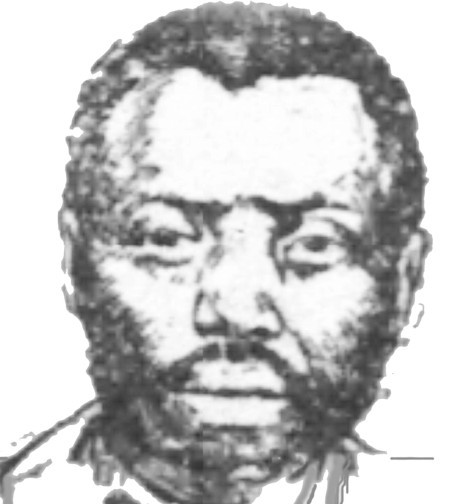
Sketch of George Dinning from 1899

George Dinning (c. 1857–1930) was an American former slave from Simpson County, Kentucky. In 1897, during self-defense of his home from an armed mob, he shot and killed the son of a wealthy white landowner. He was convicted of manslaughter, but was soon pardoned by Kentucky Governor William O'Connell Bradley. Dinning then successfully sued members of the Ku Klux Klan over the incident. His plight and case was followed in the national press; the public was divided over his guilt or innocence and the novelty of a black man suing whites in court. That a black man successfully sued the Klan was entirely new, a newspaper at the time opined that the "outcome is regarded as sensational, indicating an entirely new method of dealing with and punishing lawless mobs that have been so numerous in the south."

== Case ==
After being emancipated, Dinning saved enough money to purchase a farm in Simpson County. On January 27, 1897, a mob of 25 armed white men came to Dinning's farm, accused him of stealing hogs and chickens, and demanded he leave the county within 10 days. Dinning denied being a thief and insisted several people in the county would vouch for his good character. The mob, enraged by Dinning's resistance, began firing on his house and wounded him twice. Dinning retrieved a gun from his house and fired into the mob, killing one man, the son of a local wealthy landowner. The mob fled, and the next day, Dinning turned himself in to local officials. While he was in their custody, the mob returned to his farm, drove his family from their house, looted it, and razed it to the ground.

The Simpson County sheriff moved Dinning to Bowling Green and eventually to Louisville to prevent him from being lynched. Governor Bradley dispatched a squad of the state militia to protect him while his trial proceeded. Despite the fact that the case involved a black man killing a white man, most observers believed Dinning would be acquitted on grounds of self-defense. The jury, however, convicted Dinning of manslaughter and sentenced him to seven years of hard labor. Immediately, Kentucky Governor William O'Connell Bradley's office was flooded with requests for him to intervene on Dinning's behalf. The requests came from blacks and whites, some of them ex-Confederates. Dinning's attorney, Augustus E. Willson, formally requested a pardon, and Bradley issued it 10 days after the conviction. Bradley opined that Dinning had acted reasonably under the circumstances and that it was a shame that no members of the mob were charged.

After being freed, Dinning relocated to Indiana and hired Confederate war hero Bennett H. Young to file a federal lawsuit against some members of the mob that had identified themselves during his trial. The trial was held in Louisville, and Dinning was awarded $50,000 in damages, although the defendants were poor farmers and Dinning would ultimately collect only a fraction of that amount. That a black man successfully prevailed against the Klan in court was novel, a newspaper at the time opined that the "outcome is regarded as sensational, indicating an entirely new method of dealing with and punishing lawless mobs that have been so numerous in the south."

In 2021, author Ben Montgomery wrote a book about the case titled A Shot in the Moonlight: How a Freed Slave and a Confederate Soldier Fought for Justice in the Jim Crow South.
