= David Highbaugh Smith =

American politician

David H. Smith
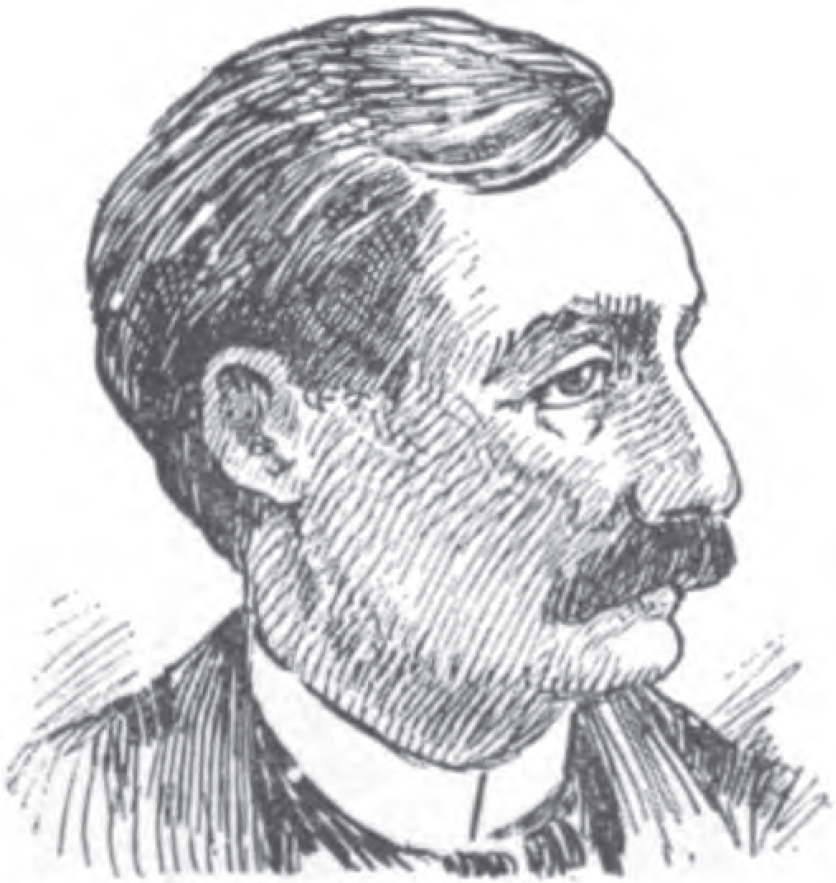

Member of the U.S. House of Representatives from Kentucky's 4th district
- In office March 4, 1897 – March 3, 1907
- Preceded by: John W. Lewis
- Succeeded by: Ben Johnson

Member of the Kentucky Senate from the 13th district
- In office August 3, 1885 – January 1, 1894
- Preceded by: Claiborne J. Walton
- Succeeded by: B. C. Gardner

Member of the Kentucky House of Representatives from LaRue County
- In office August 1, 1881 – August 6, 1883
- Preceded by: Samuel M. Sanders
- Succeeded by: Samuel M. Sanders

Personal details
- Born: December 19, 1854 Hart County, Kentucky, U.S.
- Died: December 17, 1928 (aged 73) Hodgenville, Kentucky, U.S.
- Resting place: Red Hill Cemetery
- Party: Democratic
- Profession: Lawyer

David Highbaugh Smith (December 19, 1854 – December 17, 1928) was a U.S. representative from Kentucky.

Born near Hammonville, Hart County, Kentucky, Smith attended the public schools and the colleges at Horse Cave, Leitchfield, and Hartford, Kentucky. He studied law. He was admitted to the bar in 1876 and commenced practice in Hodgenville, Kentucky. Superintendent of common schools for LaRue County in 1878. County attorney for LaRue County 1878–1881. He served as member of the State house of representatives 1881–1883. He served in the State senate 1885–1893, and as president pro tempore 1891–1893.

Smith was elected as a Democrat to the Fifty-fifth and to the four succeeding Congresses (March 4, 1897 – March 3, 1907). He was not a candidate for renomination in 1906. He was one of the managers appointed by the House of Representatives in 1905 to conduct the impeachment trial proceedings against Charles Swayne, judge of the United States District Court for the Northern District of Florida. He resumed the practice of law. He served as president of the Farmers' National Bank of Hodgenville, Kentucky. He died in Hodgenville, Kentucky, December 17, 1928. He was interred in Red Hill Cemetery.

U.S. House of Representatives
Preceded by John W. Lewis	Member of the U.S. House of Representatives from Kentucky's 4th congressional district March 4, 1897 – March 3, 1907	Succeeded by Ben Johnson
