= Thomas A. Robertson =

American politician

Thomas Austin Robertson

Member of the U.S. House of Representatives from Kentucky's 4th district
- In office March 4, 1883 – March 3, 1887
- Preceded by: J. Proctor Knott
- Succeeded by: Alexander B. Montgomery

Member of the Kentucky House of Representatives from LaRue County
- In office August 6, 1877 – January 1879
- Preceded by: Zachary T. Heady
- Succeeded by: S. M. Sanders

Personal details
- Born: September 9, 1848 Hodgenville, Kentucky, U.S.
- Died: July 18, 1892 (aged 43) Elizabethtown, Kentucky, U.S.

Thomas Austin Robertson (September 9, 1848 – July 18, 1892) was a U.S. representative from Kentucky.

Born in Hodgenville, Kentucky, Robertson pursued preparatory studies. He was graduated from Cecilian College and afterwards from the law department of the University of Louisville. He was admitted to the bar in 1871 and commenced practice at Hodgenville, Kentucky. County attorney of LaRue County 1874–1877. He served as member of the State house of representatives in 1877 and 1878. Commonwealth attorney of the eighteenth judicial district 1878–1883.

Robertson was elected as a Democrat to the Forty-eighth and Forty-ninth Congresses (March 4, 1883 – March 3, 1887). He served as chairman of the Committee on Expenditures in the Department of War (Forty-ninth Congress). He was an unsuccessful candidate for renomination in 1886. He resumed the practice of law at Elizabethtown, Kentucky, and died there July 18, 1892. He was interred in Red Hill Cemetery, Hodgenville, Kentucky.

U.S. House of Representatives
Preceded by J. Proctor Knott	Member of the U.S. House of Representatives from Kentucky's 4th congressional district March 4, 1883 – March 3, 1887	Succeeded by Alexander B. Montgomery
