= William B. Read =

American politician

William Brown Read
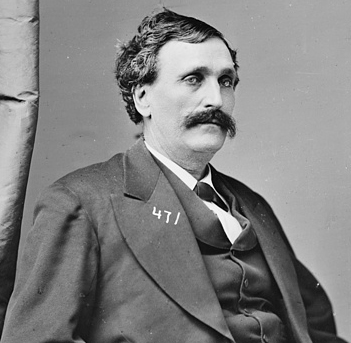

Member of the U.S. House of Representatives from Kentucky's 4th district
- In office March 4, 1871 – March 3, 1875
- Preceded by: J. Proctor Knott
- Succeeded by: J. Proctor Knott

Member of the Kentucky House of Representatives from LaRue County
- In office August 5, 1867 – August 2, 1869
- Preceded by: Jesse H. Rodman
- Succeeded by: John McDougal Atherton

Member of the Kentucky Senate
- In office August 3, 1857 – August 7, 1865
- Preceded by: William Howell
- Succeeded by: William Johnson
- Constituency: 19th district (1857–1861); 14th district (1861–1865)

Personal details
- Born: December 14, 1817 Hardin County, Kentucky, USA
- Died: August 5, 1880 (aged 62) Hodgenville, Kentucky, USA
- Party: Democratic
- Spouse: Sally Rawlings Kennedy Read
- Profession: Politician, Lawyer

William Brown Read (December 14, 1817 – August 5, 1880) was a 19th-century politician and lawyer from Kentucky.

Born in Hardin County, Kentucky, Read completed preparatory studies, studied law and was admitted to the bar, commencing practice in Hodgenville, Kentucky in 1849. He was a member of the Kentucky Senate from 1857 to 1865, was a delegate to both of the Democratic National Conventions in 1860 and was an unsuccessful candidate for Lieutenant Governor of Kentucky in 1863, losing to Richard T. Jacob. Read was again a delegate to the Democratic National Convention in 1864, was a member of the Kentucky House of Representatives from 1867 to 1869 and was elected a Democrat to the United States House of Representatives in 1870, serving from 1871 to 1875, being unsuccessful for renomination in 1874. Afterwards, he resumed practicing law until his death in Hodgenville, Kentucky on August 5, 1880. He was interred in Red Hill Cemetery in Hodgenville.

U.S. House of Representatives
Preceded by J. Proctor Knott	Member of the U.S. House of Representatives from Kentucky's 4th congressional district March 4, 1871 – March 3, 1875	Succeeded by J. Proctor Knott
