= Bennett H. Young =

Confederate Army officer (1843–1919)

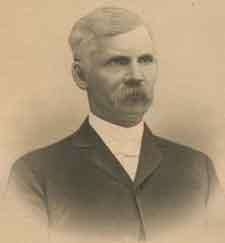
- Born: May 25, 1843; Nicholasville, Kentucky, U.S.
- Died: February 23, 1919 (aged 75); Louisville, Kentucky, U.S.
- Resting place: Cave Hill Cemetery; Louisville, Kentucky, U.S.
- Spouses: Mattie R. Robinson (m. 1866) Eliza S. Sharp (m. 1895)
- Children: 2
- Military career
- Allegiance: Confederate States of America (1861–1865)
- Branch: Confederate States Army
- Service years: 1861–1865
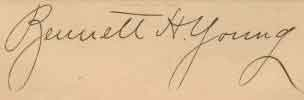
- Signature

Bennett Henderson Young (May 25, 1843 – February 23, 1919) was a commanding officer, lawyer, administrator, and author. As a Confederate officer during the American Civil War he led forces in the St. Albans Raid (October 19, 1864). After the war, he worked as a lawyer and author.

== Early life ==
Young was born in Nicholasville, Kentucky, on May 25, 1843, to Robert Young and Josephine Henderson. He was 17 years old when he enlisted as a private in the Confederate 8th Kentucky Cavalry. This unit became a part of John Hunt Morgan's cavalry command.

== St. Albans raid ==
Young was captured in Morgan's Raid but fled to Canada in the fall of 1863. Young traveled back to the Confederacy via Nova Scotia and Bermuda, where he proposed Canada-based raids on the United States as a means of building the Confederate treasury and forcing the Union Army to protect their northern border as a diversion. Young was commissioned as a lieutenant and returned to Canada, where he recruited other escaped rebels to participate in the October 19, 1864, raid on St. Albans, Vermont, a quiet town 15 miles (25 km) from the Canada–US border.

Young's Confederate wizards of the saddle; being reminiscences and observations of one who rode with Morgan (John Hunt Morgan) readable pdf file

Young and two others checked into a local hotel on October 10, saying they had come from St. John's in Canada for a "sporting vacation." Every day, two or three more young men arrived. By October 19, there were 21 cavalrymen assembled; just before 3:00 p.m. the group simultaneously staged an armed robbery of the three banks in St. Albans. They announced that they were Confederate soldiers and stole a total of $208,000 ($4,282,000 in current dollar terms). As the banks were being robbed, eight or nine of the Confederates held the townspeople prisoner on the village green as their horses were stolen. The Confederates killed one townsperson and wounded another. Young ordered his troops to burn the town down, but the four-ounce bottles of Greek fire they had brought failed to work, and only one shed was destroyed.

The raiders fled with the money into Canada, where authorities arrested them and held them in Montreal. There, the Lincoln administration retained prominent Irish-Canadian lawyer Bernard Devlin, QC, as counsel for the prosecution in the subsequent court case, which sought the raiders' extradition. The court ultimately decided that the soldiers were under military orders and that the officially neutral Canada could not extradite them to America. They were freed, but the $88,000 ($1,811,000 in current dollar terms) the raiders had on them was returned to Vermont.

== Later career ==
After the end of the Civil War, Young was excluded from President Andrew Johnson's amnesty proclamation. He could not return home until 1868. Thus, he spent time studying law and literature in Ireland at the Queen's University of Ireland and at the University of Edinburgh.

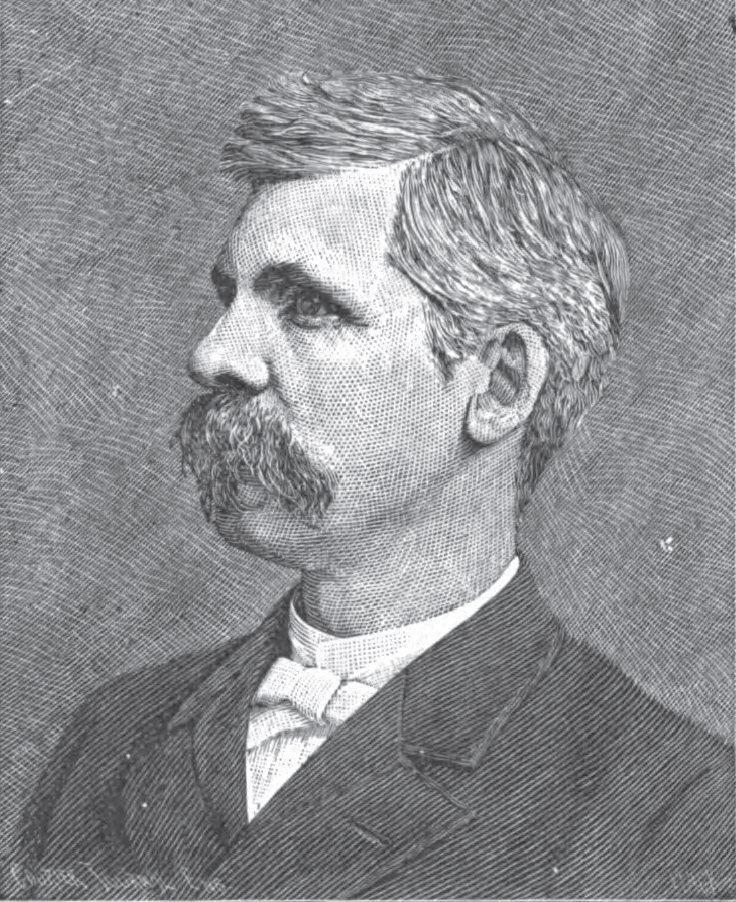

After being permitted to return to the United States, he became an attorney in Louisville, Kentucky. Young founded the first orphanage for black children in Louisville, a school for blind students, and did pro bono work for people experiencing poverty. He also worked as a railroad officer as President of the Louisville Southern Railroad, and wrote books. Young also served on the board of trustees of the Confederate Veteran.

In 1876, Young was selected by Governor James B. McCreary to represent Kentucky at the Paris Exposition of 1878.

In 1878, Young joined the Polytechnic Society of Kentucky as a financier to the institution. Young became president of the society after the death of Dr. Stuart Robinson.

In 1899, Young represented a formerly enslaved person, George Dinning, in a case against the Ku Klux Klan.

Between 1890 and 1908, Young helped create the Louisville Free Public Library.

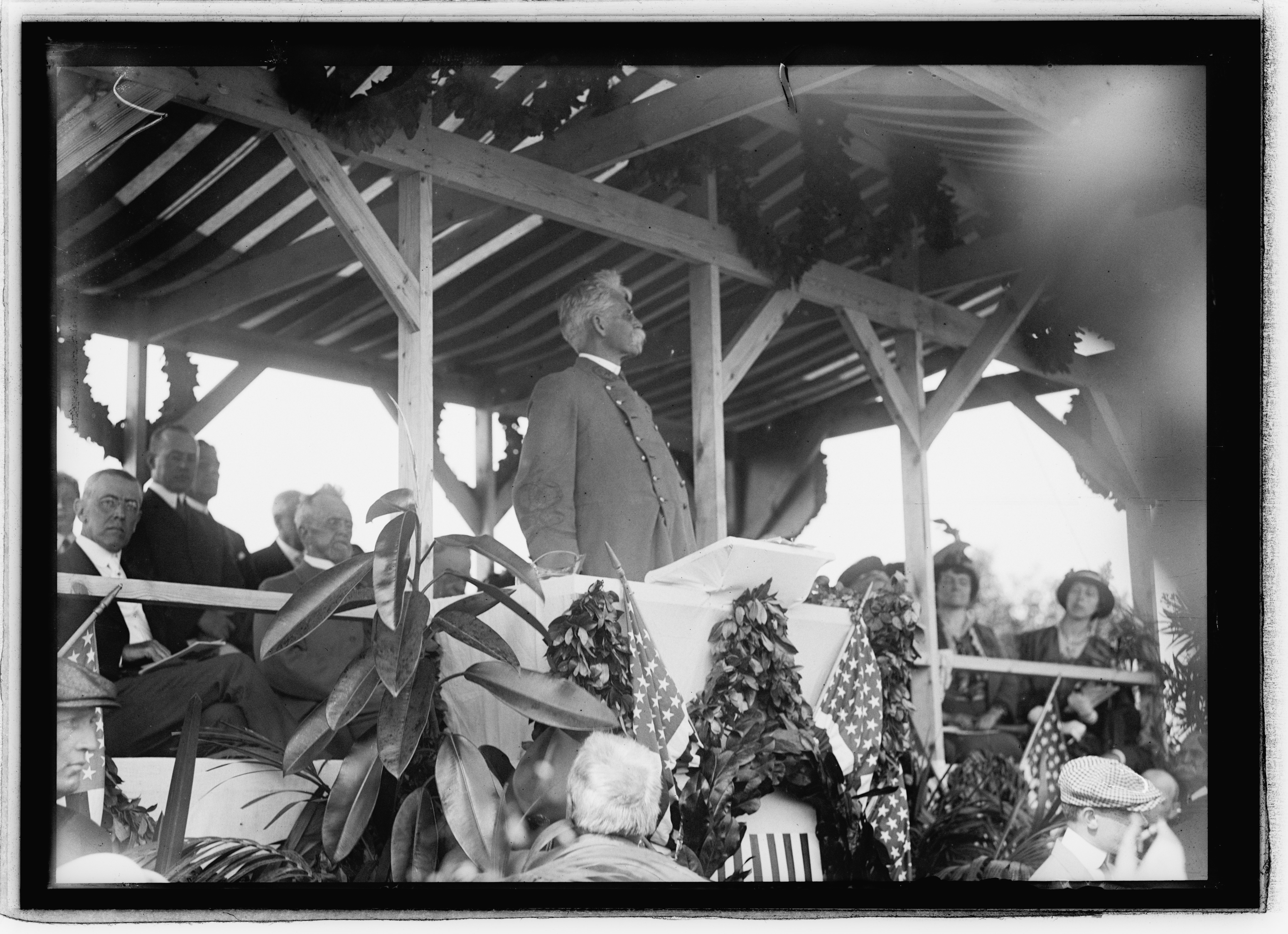
Unveiling of Confederate monument at Arlington National Cemetery

In 1913, Young was elected commander-in-chief of the United Confederate Veterans, which he held until his retirement in 1916, where he was made "honorary commander-in-chief for life."

== Family life ==
In 1866, Young married Mattie R. Robinson, and they had a son Lawrence, who became an attorney in Chicago. He remarried in 1895 to Eliza S. Sharp, and they had a daughter, Eliza Bennett Young.

== List of works ==
- The Prehistoric Men of Kentucky
- The History of the Kentucky Constitution

Young's Dr. Gander of Youngland readable pdf file

- Evangelistic Work in Kentucky
- Battle of Blue Licks
- The History of Jessamine County
- The History of the Division of the Presbyterian Church in Kentucky
- The Battle of the Thames
- Dr. Gander of Youngland
- Kentucky Eloquence
- Confederate Wizards of the Saddle

== Death and legacy ==
By 1908, Young was known as "the father of the Louisville Free Public Library."

Young died on February 23, 1919, at his home at 429 West Ormsby Avenue in Louisville, Kentucky. He was buried at Cave Hill Cemetery in Louisville.

The railroad bridge over the Kentucky River at Tyrone, Kentucky was named Young's High Bridge for him, and Youngstown, Kentucky was also named for him.
