= Messenger-Inquirer =

Newspaper in Owensboro, Kentucky

The Messenger-Inquirer
- Type: Daily newspaper
- Format: Broadsheet
- Owner: Paxton Media Group
- Publisher: Mike Weafer
- Editor: Matt Francis
- Founded: 1875
- Language: English
- Headquarters: 1401 Frederica St. Owensboro, Kentucky 42301; United States
- Circulation: 15,087 Monday-Saturday; 20,383 Sunday
- Website: messenger-inquirer.com

The Messenger-Inquirer is a local newspaper in Owensboro, Kentucky. The Messenger-Inquirer serves 15,087 daily and 20,383 Sunday readers in five counties in western Kentucky.

== History ==
The newspaper's roots trace back to 1875, when Lee Lumpkin founded The Examiner.

The newspaper's name was later changed to the Messenger. The Messenger was purchased by the Hager family, owners of the competing Owensboro Inquirer, in 1929.

By 1864, when Thomas S. Pettit purchased the paper, it had changed its name to The Monitor. Immediately after taking control of the paper, Pettit published a series of items vigorously criticizing the Republican Party and its policies during the Civil War. On November 17, 1864, Pettit was arrested on orders from General Stephen G. Burbridge on charges of being "notoriously disloyal" to the Union. He was taken to Memphis, Tennessee, and transferred into Confederate territory.

In May 1865, he returned to Owensboro and found his print shop and printing press had been destroyed by federal authorities. He traveled to Cincinnati, Ohio to purchase replacement equipment and, on hearing the story of his arrest and subsequent travels, the equipment dealer extended him a generous line of credit, allowing him to purchase more sophisticated equipment than had ever before been used in Owensboro. With this new equipment, Pettit revived the Monitor and published his stories of wartime banishment, bringing him significant acclaim in Kentucky. Moreover, he also published editorials by future U.S. Senator Thomas C. McCreery, giving the Monitor further credibility and increasing its readership.

The newspaper was purchased by A.H. Belo Corp. (then-owner of the Dallas Morning News) in 1997 for an undisclosed sum.

Belo sold the newspaper to Paxton Media Group in 2000.
