= Daniel Pettit =

English footballer & industrialist (1915–2010)

Personal information
- Full name: Daniel Eric Arthur Pettit
- Date of birth: 19 February 1915
- Place of birth: Liverpool, England
- Date of death: 28 July 2010 (aged 95)
- Place of death: Worcester, England

Senior career*
Years	Team	Apps	(Gls)
- Cambridge University

International career
1936	Great Britain	1	(0)
- * Club domestic league appearances and goals

Sir Daniel Eric Arthur Pettit (19 February 1915 – 28 July 2010) was an English footballer, soldier, and industrialist.

== Early life ==
Daniel Pettit was born in Liverpool in 1915, the son of Thomas Edgar Pettit, a book keeper and fruit merchant who lived in Peter Road, Walton, at the time of Daniel's birth. Thomas Pettit and his wife Pauline (née Kerr) later moved with their family to an address in Mossley Hill.

== Education and football career ==
After leaving Quarry Bank High School in Liverpool in 1934, Pettit studied history at Fitzwilliam College, Cambridge (then known as Fitzwilliam House), where he won the Clothworkers' Exhibition in his second year and graduated with an upper-second class degree in 1937. Having played for the youth teams of both Everton and Liverpool, Pettit also played amateur football for Cambridge University, captaining the side during the 1937–38 season.

Whilst still at university Pettit represented Great Britain in Football at the 1936 Summer Olympics. After arriving in Berlin he was obliged to attend a reception at the British Embassy, where the guest of honour was Adolf Hitler. With no option but to shake the Führer's hand, Pettit was often heard to say in subsequent years that he had been washing his own hand ever since. The British team lost 5–4 in the quarter-finals to the eventual winners Poland.

== Later life ==
After graduation Pettit was a history master at Highgate School. He served in the Second World War from 1940 with the Royal Artillery in Africa, India and Burma, learning Swahili and demobilising with the rank of Major in 1946. He returned briefly to Highgate before joining Unilever in late 1947 to work in corporate management, during which time he advised a young trainee named Paul McCartney to "spend less time messing about with music and concentrate on his career." From 1958 to 1970 he was Associate Company Director and then Chairman of Unilever.

Thereafter, in his final working years, Pettit was a distinguished industrialist of national renown, serving as Chairman of the National Freight Corporation from 1971 to 1978, and Director of Lloyds Bank from 1977 to 1985. During this latter period he was also Chairman of the Post and Telecommunications (PosTel) Investment Management Fund. He was made a Freeman of the City of London in 1971 and knighted for his services to industry in 1974.

He married in 1940 Winifred, daughter of William Bibby, by whom he had two sons. Pettit lived latterly at Bransford Court near Worcester.
