= Garth Pettitt =

British civil servant

Robert Garth Pettitt (14 August 1932 – 29 May 1992) was a British civil servant in the Foreign and Commonwealth Office, and subsequently worked at the Overseas Development Authority.

Pettitt's work was vital for the independence process for several former British territories in the Pacific.

Pettitt married Elizabeth Jenkins in 1964 (she died in 1970) and had one son and one daughter. He had a keen interest in birdwatching, and was a motorcyclist who joined the Sunbeam Motor Cycle Club.
