= Tiptop, Kentucky =

Unincorporated community in Kentucky, United States

- Unincorporated community
- Location within Kentucky Location within the United States
- Coordinates: 37°36′50″N 83°3′40″W
- Country: United States
- State: Kentucky
- County: Magoffin
- Elevation: 1,033 ft (315 m)
- Time zone: UTC-5 (Eastern (EST))
  - Summer (DST): UTC-4 (EDT)
- GNIS feature ID: 505307

Tiptop is an unincorporated community located in Magoffin County, Kentucky, United States. Tiptop was established as a coal mining community.
