= Tom Pettit (footballer) =

Australian rules footballer

Personal information
- Full name: Thomas Pettit
- Born: 24 July 1885; Brunswick, Victoria
- Died: 8 June 1970 (aged 84); Deepdene, Victoria

Playing career^{1}
Years	Club	Games (Goals)
1906	South Melbourne	1 (0)
- ^{1} Playing statistics correct to the end of 1906.

Tom Pettit (24 July 1885 – 8 June 1970) was an Australian rules footballer who played with South Melbourne in the Victorian Football League (VFL).
