= USS Pettit =

1943 Edsall-class destroyer escort

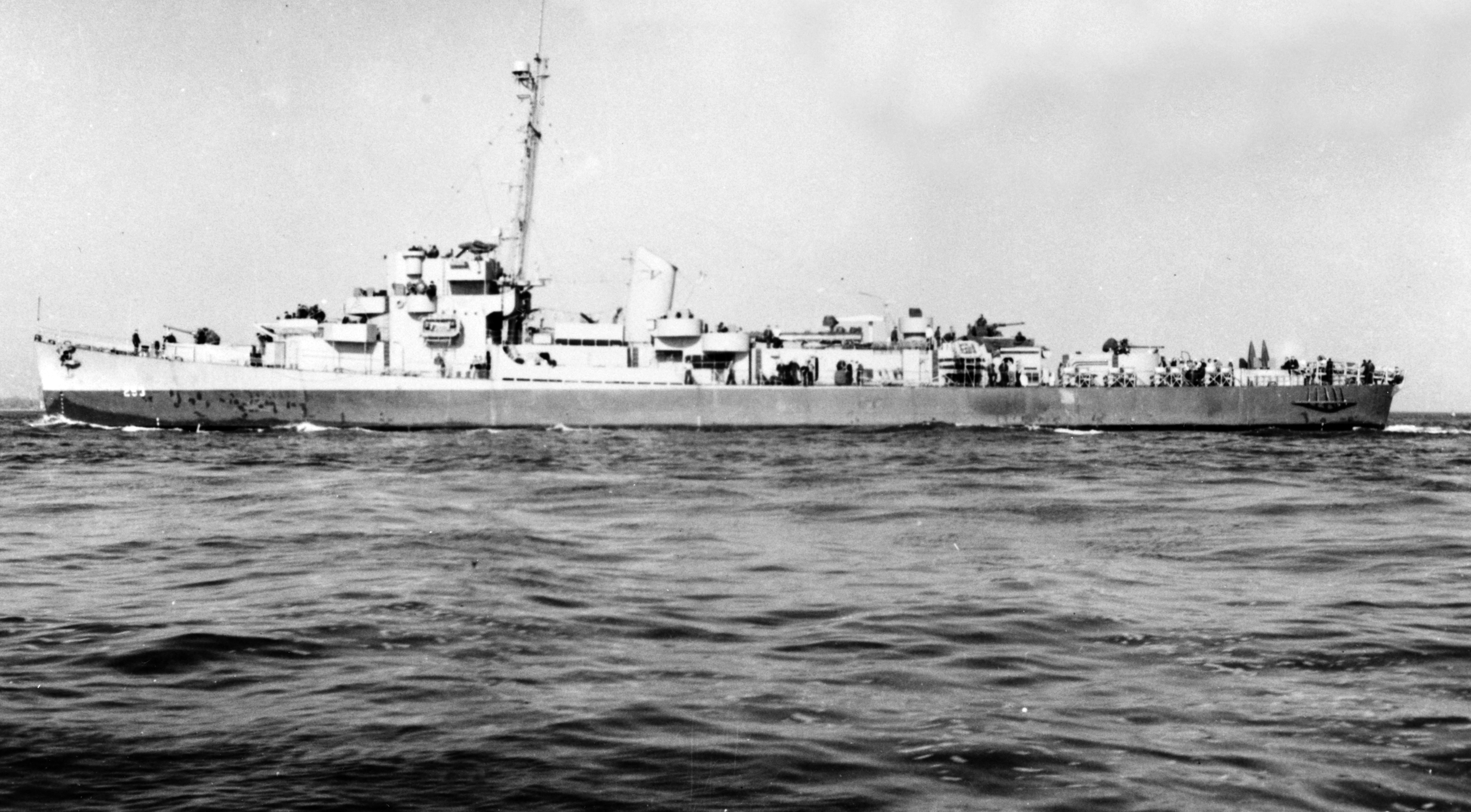

History

United States
- Namesake: Robert Lee Pettit
- Builder: Brown Shipbuilding Houston, Texas
- Laid down: 6 February 1943
- Launched: 28 April 1943
- Commissioned: 23 September 1943
- Decommissioned: 6 May 1946
- Stricken: 1 August 1973
- Fate: Sunk as target off Puerto Rico 30 September 1974

General characteristics
- Class & type: Edsall-class destroyer escort
- Displacement: 1,253 tons standard; 1,590 tons full load
- Length: 306 feet (93.27 m)
- Beam: 36.58 feet (11.15 m)
- Draft: 10.42 full load feet (3.18 m)
- Propulsion: 4 FM diesel engines, 4 diesel-generators, 6,000 shp (4.5 MW), 2 screws
- Speed: 21 knots (39 km/h)
- Range: 9,100 nmi. at 12 knots; (17,000 km at 22 km/h)
- Complement: 8 officers, 201 enlisted
- Armament: 3 × single 3 in (76 mm)/50 guns; 1 × twin 40 mm AA guns; 8 × single 20 mm AA guns; 1 × triple 21 in (533 mm) torpedo tubes; 8 × depth charge projectors; 1 × depth charge projector (hedgehog); 2 × depth charge tracks

USS Pettit (DE-253) was an Edsall-class destroyer escort in service with the United States Navy from 1943 to 1946. She was sunk as a target in 1974.

== Namesake ==
Robert Lee Pettit was born on 17 November 1906 in Clare, Michigan. He enlisted in the United States Navy on 13 September 1927 and attained the rate of Radioman First Class on 16 February 1938. He died in his PBY Catalina aircraft at Jolo Harbor, Philippines on 27 December 1941, as he remained bravely at his post in the burning, gasoline-flooded radio compartment. He was posthumously awarded the Navy Cross.

== History ==
USS Pettit was laid down 6 February 1943 by the Brown Shipbuilding Co., Houston, Texas; launched 28 April 1943; sponsored by Mrs. Robert Lee Pettit; and commissioned 23 September 1943.

=== Battle of the Atlantic ===
After Atlantic shakedown, Pettit reported for duty to Commander, Destroyers, Atlantic. Assigned to Destroyer Escort Division 20 in December 1943, she operated out of Norfolk, Virginia, that month to train destroyer escort nucleus crews. Later in December she escorted a convoy from Norfolk to Casablanca, Morocco, where she arrived 2 January 1944. She returned from this assignment to Brooklyn, New York, 24 January 1944. When stationed in home waters, Pettit trained periodically at Montauk Point, New York, and Casco Bay, Maine. From February 1944 to June 1945, she escorted trans-Atlantic convoys principally between Derry, Northern Ireland, and New York, New York. She also called at the ports of Cherbourg and Le Havre, France, and Plymouth, Liverpool, and Southampton, England.

=== Pacific War ===
After V-E Day, Pettit proceeded via Guantanamo Bay, Cuba, the Panama Canal, and San Diego, California, to Hawaii, arriving Pearl Harbor 25 July. She departed for Eniwetok, Marshall Islands, 27 August, and arrived there 3 September. From September into November 1945, she searched for possible Allied survivors on islands in the southwest Pacific. In December 1945 she operated from Pearl Harbor on a weather patrol.

=== Decommissioning and fate ===
Pettit decommissioned 6 May 1946 and entered the Atlantic Reserve Fleet. Into 1970 she was berthed at Norfolk. On 30 September 1974, she was sunk as target off Puerto Rico.
