= Thomas S. Pettit =

American politician (1843–1931)

Thomas Pettit
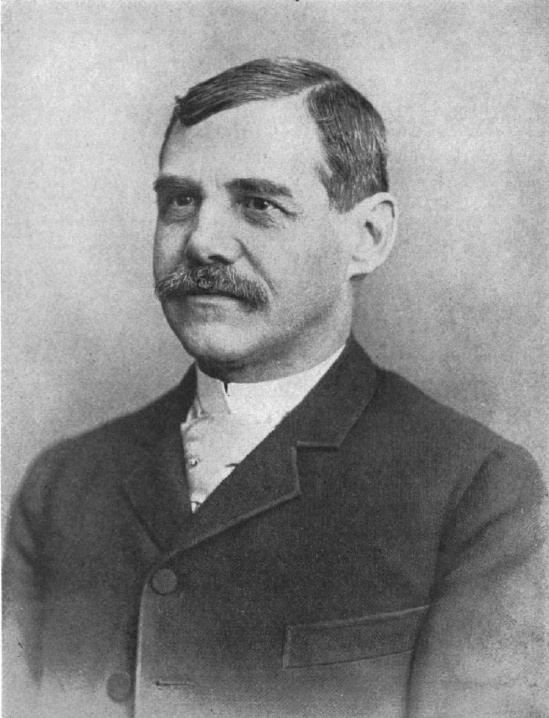
- Born: December 21, 1843; Frankfort, Kentucky
- Died: November 29, 1931 (aged 87); Owensboro, Kentucky
- Education: Georgetown College
- Occupation: Newspaper publisher
- Known for: Publisher of the Owensboro Monitor; active in Democratic politics
- Political party: Democrat; Populist
- Spouses: Margaret Blair (m. 1870–1913) Alice Frakes (m. 1916–1931)

Member of the Kentucky House of Representatives from Daviess County
- In office August 3, 1891 – January 1, 1894 Serving with B. T. Birkhead
- Preceded by: James H. Rudy; R. S. Triplett
- Succeeded by: A. C. Tompkins (Note: As the representative from the 15th district.); B. T. Birkhead (Note: As the representative from the 16th district.)

Thomas Stevenson Pettit (December 21, 1843 – November 29, 1931) was a newspaper publisher and politician from the U.S. state of Kentucky. Orphaned at age ten, he found work in a printing house in his hometown of Frankfort. In 1864, he moved to Owensboro, Kentucky, and purchased a newspaper called the Monitor. He incurred the wrath of Union Army General Stephen G. Burbridge because he vigorously criticized the Republicans' policies during the Civil War; Burbridge ordered Pettit arrested and relocated behind Confederate lines for the duration of the war.

Following the war, Pettit returned to Owensboro and revived the Monitor. He became involved in politics, serving as personal secretary to Governor James B. McCreary and Reading Clerk of the United States House of Representatives. In the early 1890s, he began to split from the Democrats' political philosophy and was elected to the Kentucky House of Representatives as an Independent. He was the Populist Party's nominee for governor in the 1895 gubernatorial election. Although he fell well short of election, his presence on the ticket drew enough votes from Democratic candidate Parker Watkins Hardin to give the election to William O. Bradley, who became Kentucky's first Republican governor. Pettit never again sought public office, but amassed a sizable personal fortune through various business investments in and around Owensboro. He died November 29, 1931. The town of Pettit, Kentucky was built on land he helped clear and was named in his honor.

== Early life ==
Thomas Pettit was born December 21, 1843, in Frankfort, Kentucky. He was the son of Franklin Duane and Elizabeth (Zook) Pettit. Franklin Pettit, who co-published The Kentucky Farmer with Thomas B. Stevenson, died when his son Thomas was very young. Soon after, Thomas' mother also died, leaving him an orphan at the age of ten.

== Printing career ==
Pettit supported himself by working in a print shop. He was educated in the common schools of Frankfort and briefly attended Georgetown College in Georgetown, Kentucky. In 1864, he moved to Owensboro, Kentucky, where he purchased a local newspaper called the Monitor. Upon taking control of the paper, he published a series of items vigorously criticizing the Republican Party and its policies during the Civil War. On November 17, 1864, Pettit was arrested on orders from General Stephen G. Burbridge on charges of being "notoriously disloyal" to the Union. He was taken to Memphis, Tennessee, and transferred into Confederate territory; he continued to travel behind Confederate lines for the duration of the war.

In May 1865, Pettit returned to Owensboro and found his print shop and printing press destroyed by federal authorities. He traveled to Cincinnati, Ohio to purchase replacement equipment and, on hearing the story of his arrest and subsequent travels, the equipment dealer extended him a generous line of credit, allowing him to purchase more sophisticated equipment than had ever before been used in Owensboro. With this new equipment, Pettit revived the Monitor and published his stories of wartime banishment, bringing him significant acclaim in Kentucky. Moreover, he also published editorials by future U.S. Senator Thomas C. McCreery, giving the Monitor further credibility and increasing its readership.

In December 1870, Pettit married Margaret Blair, the daughter of a prominent Owensboro merchant. The couple had one son, Harvey Blair Pettit.

After many years of publishing the Monitor, Pettit sold the paper to Urey Woodson, who changed its name to the Owensboro Messenger (now the Messenger-Inquirer).

== Political career ==
In 1868, Pettit was elected assistant reading clerk in the Kentucky House of Representatives, a position he held for six years. Through the influence of Senator Thomas McCreery, Pettit was appointed assessor of internal revenue for the second district by President Andrew Johnson in 1869 and served in this capacity through the end of Johnson's term. Upon James B. McCreary's election as governor of Kentucky in 1874, Pettit accepted an appointment as the governor's private secretary. He later resigned this position after being elected Reading Clerk of the U.S. House of Representatives. He retained this position until the Republicans regained a majority in the House in the elections of 1880.

In 1882, Pettit sought election to the U.S. House of Representatives, representing the Second District. He lost in the Democratic primary by 150 votes to James Franklin Clay of Henderson. The vote of Union County was thought to be the deciding factor in the primary.

Contemporary biographers opined that Pettit had probably attended more Democratic state conventions than anyone else in Kentucky. At each convention he attended, he was elected secretary. He served as one of the secretaries at the 1884 Democratic National Convention; four years later, he was again chosen as a convention secretary and a member of the committee to officially notify Grover Cleveland and Allen G. Thurman of their nominations for president and vice-president, respectively. In 1890, he was chosen as a delegate to the Kentucky constitutional convention. He successfully advocated for many changes to the Kentucky Constitution including the use of secret ballot voting in state elections and the requirement of a two-thirds majority for conviction in civil court cases.

In the early 1890s, Pettit's views began to differ from those of the Democratic Party. Immediately following the constitutional convention, he was elected as an Independent to represent Daviess County in the state House of Representatives. Though he was elected by a large majority, his candidacy was bitterly contested in his district. At the organizational meeting of the General Assembly, he received four votes for Speaker of the House, all from representatives of districts in western Kentucky.

Estranged from the Democratic Party by his refusal to identify with them during his race for the House, Pettit became a leader of the Populist Party in Kentucky. In 1893, he sought re-election to his seat as a Populist but was badly defeated by a Democratic candidate. Redistricting and an inefficient legislative session were factors in the defeats of several Populist candidates during the 1893 elections.

In July 1895, the Populist Party nominated Pettit for governor. He received the endorsement of Louisville's New South newspaper, one of the largest black newspapers in the state. The American Protective Association (APA), an influential society opposed to Catholicism, endorsed the entire Republican ticket except the party's gubernatorial candidate, William O. Bradley. The APA withheld its endorsement from Bradley because of rumors that some of his family members were Catholic, and the society was thought to favor Pettit until Bradley was reported to have joined the society in September 1895, forestalling their endorsement of Pettit. Pettit was not invited to participate in a series of debates held throughout the state between Bradley and Democratic nominee Parker Watkins Hardin.

In the general election, Pettit garnered 16,911 votes, compared to 172,436 for Bradley and 163,524 for Hardin. Although he had not been elected, his presence on the ballot had taken a significant number of Democratic votes from Hardin and resulted in the election of Bradley, Kentucky's first Republican governor.

== Later life and death ==
Pettit never again sought public office, but remained interested and active in politics, notably campaigning for William Goebel during the contentious 1899 gubernatorial election. He engaged in clearing and improving land in Daviess County, and the settlement that grew up on this land was named Pettit in his honor. Through a series of investments in various business ventures, Pettit built a substantial personal fortune. A prominent philanthropist, Pettit identified with the Presbyterian church and served as president of the Owensboro Masonic Temple and Grand Master of the Kentucky Order of the Free and Accepted Masons.

Pettit's wife died in June 1913. In September 1916, he married Alice Frakes. Pettit died in Owensboro on November 29, 1931.
