= J. Proctor Knott =

American politician (1830–1911)

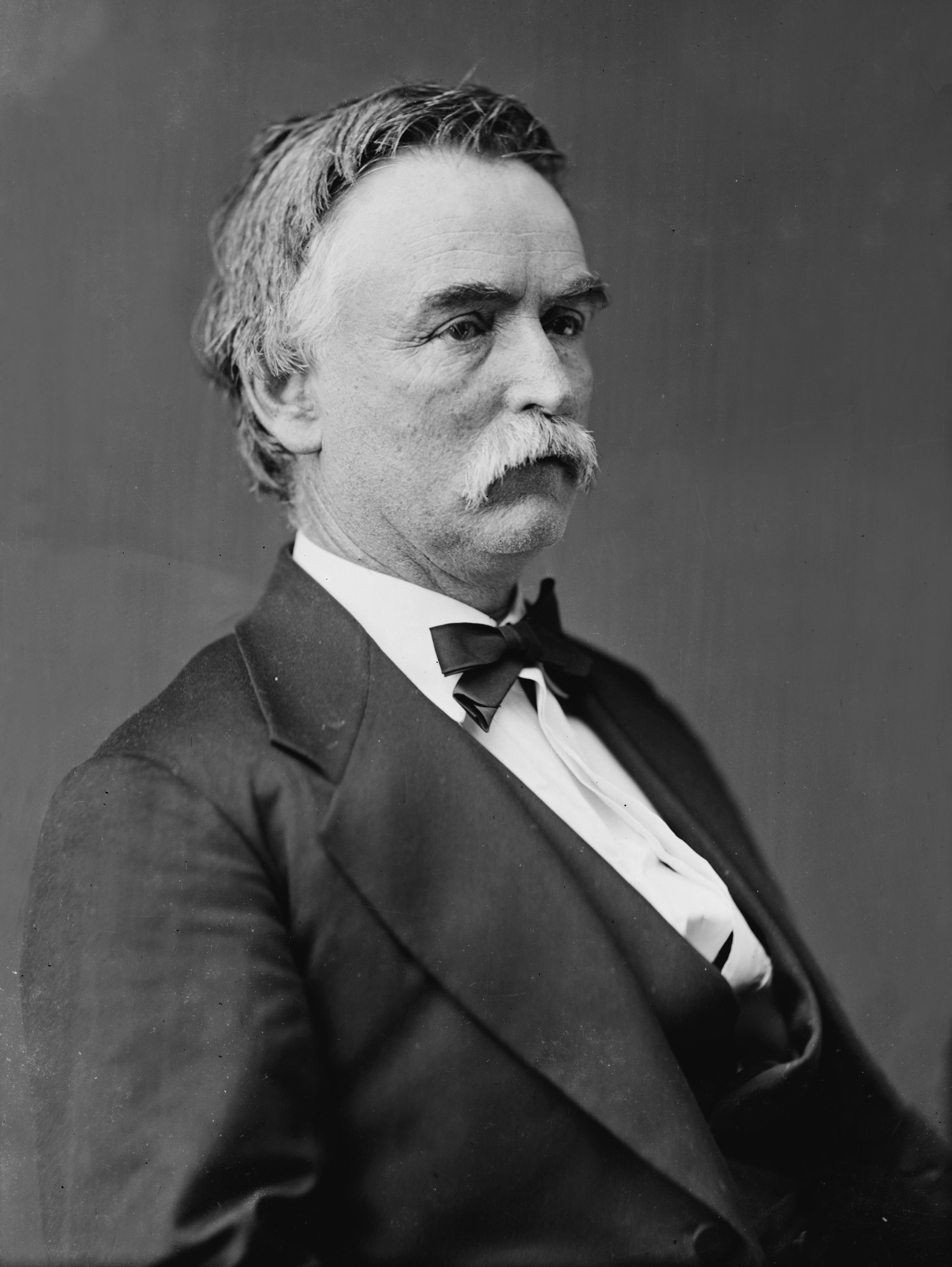
- Knott, 1870–1880

29th Governor of Kentucky
- In office September 5, 1883 – August 30, 1887
- Lieutenant: James R. Hindman
- Preceded by: Luke P. Blackburn
- Succeeded by: Simon B. Buckner

Member of the U.S. House of Representatives from Kentucky's 4th district
- In office March 4, 1867 – March 3, 1871
- Preceded by: Aaron Harding
- Succeeded by: William B. Read
- In office March 4, 1875 – March 3, 1883
- Preceded by: William B. Read
- Succeeded by: Thomas A. Robertson

Missouri Attorney General
- In office 1858–1861
- Governor: Robert Marcellus Stewart
- Preceded by: Ephraim B. Ewing
- Succeeded by: Aikman Welch

Member of the Missouri House of Representatives
- In office 1857–1858

Personal details
- Born: James Proctor Knott; August 29, 1830 Raywick, Kentucky, U.S.
- Died: June 18, 1911 (aged 80) Lebanon, Kentucky, U.S.
- Resting place: Ryder Cemetery
- Party: Democratic
- Spouses: Mary E. Forman (m. 1852; died 1853) Sarah R. McElroy (m. 1858)
- Profession: Lawyer

James Proctor Knott (August 29, 1830 – June 18, 1911) was a U.S. representative from Kentucky and served as the 29th governor of Kentucky from 1883 to 1887. Born in Kentucky, he moved to Missouri in 1850 and began his political career there. He served as Missouri Attorney General from 1859 to 1861, when he resigned rather than swear an oath of allegiance to the federal government just prior to the outbreak of the Civil War.

Knott was disbarred and briefly imprisoned for his refusal to take the oath of allegiance. He returned to Kentucky in 1863 and was elected to the U.S. House of Representatives. In 1871, he made a notable speech ridiculing a bill to subsidize westward expansion of railroads. In the speech, he lampooned the remote town of Duluth, Minnesota. The Duluth speech was eventually reprinted in several publications and brought Knott national acclaim. He did not stand for re-election in 1870, instead making a failed run for the office of governor. In 1875, he returned to the House and served as chair of the judiciary committee.

In 1883, Knott left Congress and made a successful run for governor. He secured major reforms in education, but was stymied in his pursuit of tax reform. After his term as governor, he was a delegate to the state's constitutional convention in 1891. In 1892, he became a professor at Centre College in Danville, Kentucky and helped organized the college's law school in 1894. He served as dean of the law school until an illness forced him to retire in 1902. He died at his home in Lebanon, Kentucky on June 18, 1911.

== Early life ==
J. Proctor Knott was born in Raywick, Kentucky, on August 29, 1830. He was the son of Joseph Percy and Maria Irvine (McElroy) Knott. He was tutored by his father from an early age, and later attended public school in Marion and Shelby counties. In 1846, he began to study law. In May 1850, he relocated to Memphis, Missouri, where he was admitted to the bar and commenced practice in 1851. He also served in the offices of the circuit court and county clerks.

Knott married Mary E. Forman on November 17, 1852. Forman died during the birth of the couple's first child in August 1853. On January 14, 1858, Knott married his cousin, Sarah R. McElroy.

== Political career ==
Knott's political career began in 1857 when he was elected to represent Scotland County in the Missouri House of Representatives. He served as chair of the judiciary committee and conducted the impeachment hearings against Judge Albert Jackson. Knott resigned his seat in the legislature in August 1858 to accept Governor Robert M. Stewart's appointment to fill the unexpired term of Missouri's attorney general, Ephraim B. Ewing. In 1860, he was elected to a full term as attorney general.

In January 1861, Missouri called a convention to determine whether it would follow the lead of other pro-slavery states and secede from the Union. Knott was sympathetic to the southern cause, but opposed the methods of the secessionists. The Unionist position carried the convention by an 80,000-vote majority. Knott resigned his position as attorney general rather than take an oath of allegiance required by the federal government. As a result of his refusal, he was disbarred from practice in the state of Missouri and imprisoned for a short time.

=== In the House of Representatives ===
In 1863, Knott returned to Kentucky and re-opened his legal practice in Lebanon. He was elected as a Democrat to the U.S. House of Representatives in 1867. As a legislator, he opposed the Reconstruction agenda of the Radical Republicans and ratification of the Fourteenth and Fifteenth amendments. He was re-elected to a second term, but did not stand for re-election in 1870.

Knott's most notable action as a legislator occurred near the end of his first stint in Congress. On January 27, 1871, he delivered a satirical speech ridiculing a bill that would have provided fifty-seven land grants and financial concessions to railroads to further their westward expansion. In the speech, Knott singled out the proposed Bayfield and St. Croix Railroad's proposed line from the St. Croix River to Duluth, Minnesota to make his point. He derided the remoteness of the town and the need for a railroad to it by repeatedly referring to a map and asking where Duluth was located. Following the speech, the railroad bill was killed and Congress adjourned for the day.

Knott's speech, known as Duluth! or The Untold Delights of Duluth, brought him national acclaim and copies of the speech were reprinted and sold. Residents of Duluth apparently were not offended by the speech, extending an offer for Knott to visit the city; Knott accepted the offer in 1891. In 1894, a city near Duluth was incorporated as "Proctorknott"; in 1904, it adopted its present name of Proctor, Minnesota.

In 1871, Knott made an unsuccessful bid to become governor of Kentucky, losing the Democratic nomination to Preston Leslie. He was re-elected to the House of Representatives in 1875, serving four consecutive terms. He chaired the House Judiciary Committee for the first three of these terms. In 1876, he was named one of the managers of impeachment proceedings against ex-Secretary of War William W. Belknap.

=== As governor of Kentucky ===
Knott was one of several candidates seeking the Democratic gubernatorial nomination in 1883. Other prominent candidates included Congressman Thomas Laurens Jones, former Confederate general Simon Bolivar Buckner, Judge John S. Owsley, and Louisville mayor Charles Donald Jacob. Balloting began on May 16, 1883, with Jones as the leading vote-getter but unable to secure a majority. After four ballots, Jacob withdrew his name, and Knott moved into the lead. The following day, Owsley dropped out of the balloting, and Knott extended his lead. Though Buckner remained on the ballot, the race came down to Jones and Knott. Delegates from Owen County switched to Knott, and other counties soon followed suit. Jones withdrew, and Knott was nominated unanimously.

In the general election, Knott defeated Republican Thomas Z. Morrow by a margin of nearly 45,000 votes. During his term in office, he asked the legislature to conduct a thorough reform of the state's tax system, but the legislators' only response was to create a board of equalization charged with making equitable tax assessments. The legislature also refused to grant the Railroad Commission all the powers Knott had requested.

Knott's most successful initiatives were in the area of education. Under his leadership, the state established a normal school for blacks in Frankfort and created a state teacher's organization. New legislation spelled out, often for the first time in the state's history, the duties and responsibilities of educators, administrators, and school boards.

Knott's major shortcomings were in deterring crime. Despite the feuds that continued to rage in the state, including one that lasted several years in Rowan County, Knott refused to acknowledge lawlessness as a problem. Overcrowding of prisons prompted Knott to employ his pardon power liberally. The legislature approved the construction of the Kentucky State Penitentiary at Eddyville, but it was Knott's predecessor, Luke P. Blackburn, who laid most of the groundwork for this project.

== Later life and death ==
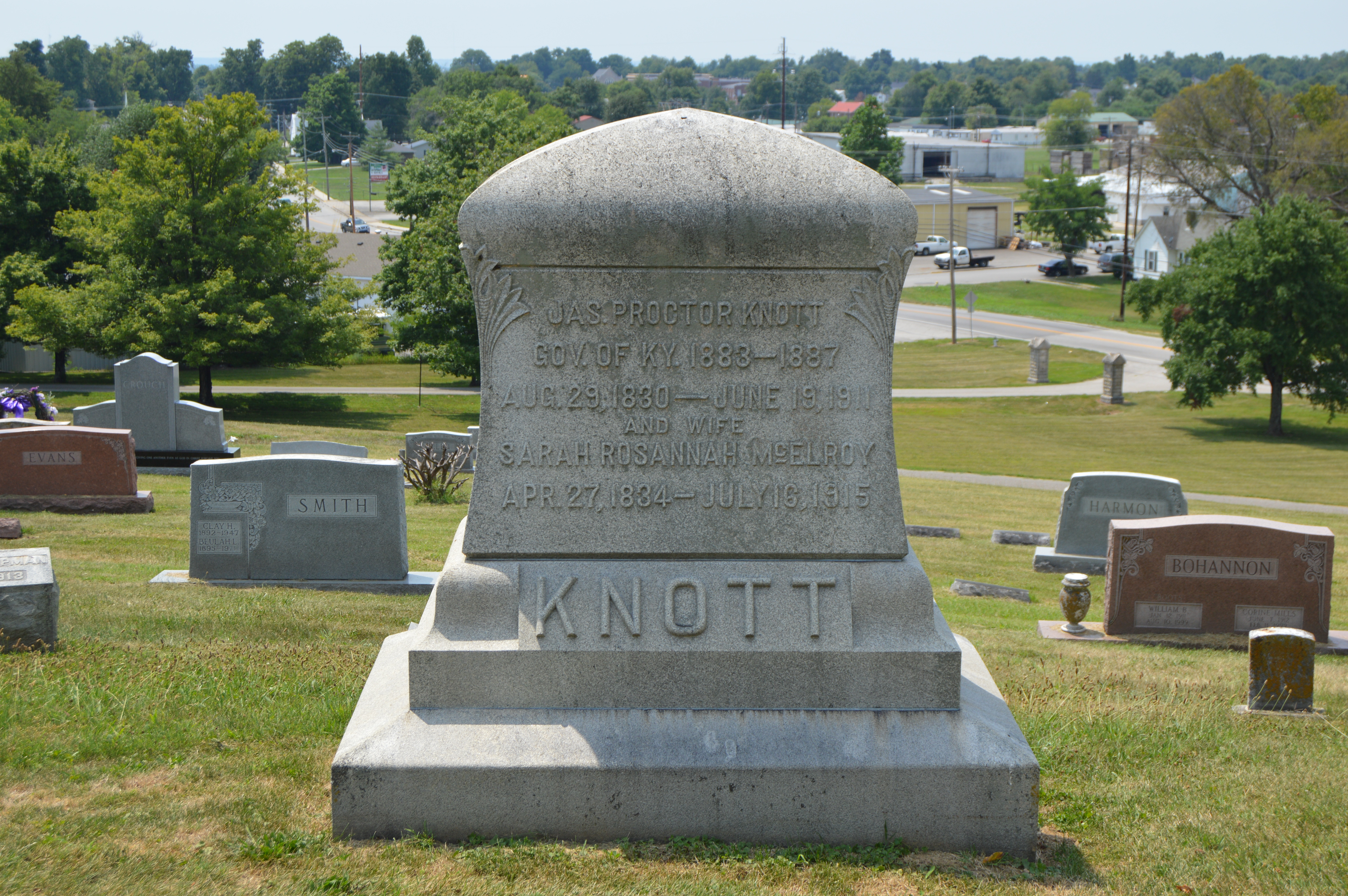
Knott's grave in Lebanon

Following his term as governor, Knott continued his legal practice in Frankfort. He declined two separate appointments offered to him by President Grover Cleveland. The first was to become Territorial Governor of Hawaii; the other was an appointment to the Interstate Commerce Commission. Knott served as a special assistant to Kentucky's attorney general in 1887 and 1888, and in 1891, he was chosen as a delegate to the state constitutional convention.

Knott became a professor of civics and economics at Centre College in Danville, Kentucky in 1892. In 1894, Knott and Centre president William C. Young organized a law department at the college; Knott became the department's first dean. An illness forced him to retire in 1902. He died in Lebanon on June 18, 1911, and was buried at the Ryder Cemetery in Lebanon. Knott County, Kentucky was formed in 1884 and named in his honor.

Party political offices
Preceded by Luke P. Blackburn	Democratic nominee for Governor of Kentucky; 1883	Succeeded by Simon Bolivar Buckner
Legal offices
Preceded by Ephraim B. Ewing	Missouri State Attorney General; 1858–1861	Succeeded by Aikman Welch
U.S. House of Representatives
Preceded by Aaron Harding	Member of the U.S. House of Representatives from Kentucky's 4th congressional district March 4, 1867 – March 3, 1871	Succeeded by William B. Read
Preceded by William B. Read	Member of the U.S. House of Representatives from Kentucky's 4th congressional district March 4, 1875 – March 3, 1883	Succeeded by Thomas A. Robertson
Political offices
Preceded by Luke P. Blackburn	Governor of Kentucky; 1883 – 1887	Succeeded by Simon B. Buckner
