= Samuel Hanson Stone =

American politician

Samuel H. Stone
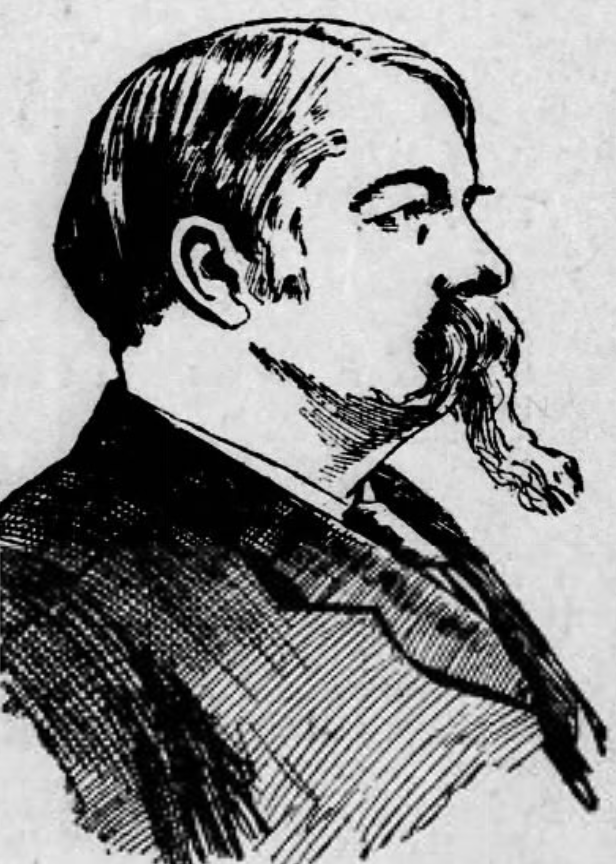
- Sketch of Stone, c. 1909

15th Kentucky Auditor of Public Accounts
- In office 1896–1900
- Preceded by: L.C. Norman
- Succeeded by: John S. Sweeney

Personal details
- Born: December 4, 1849 Madison County, Kentucky
- Died: April 3, 1903 (aged 53) Galveston, Texas
- Resting place: Richmond Cemetery; Richmond, Kentucky
- Party: Republican
- Education: Leipzig University

Samuel Hanson Stone (December 4, 1849 – April 3, 1909) was an American farmer and politician from Kentucky who served as the state's 15th Auditor of Public Accounts from 1896 to 1900. He unsuccessfully sought the Republican nomination for governor in 1899.

== Early life and education ==
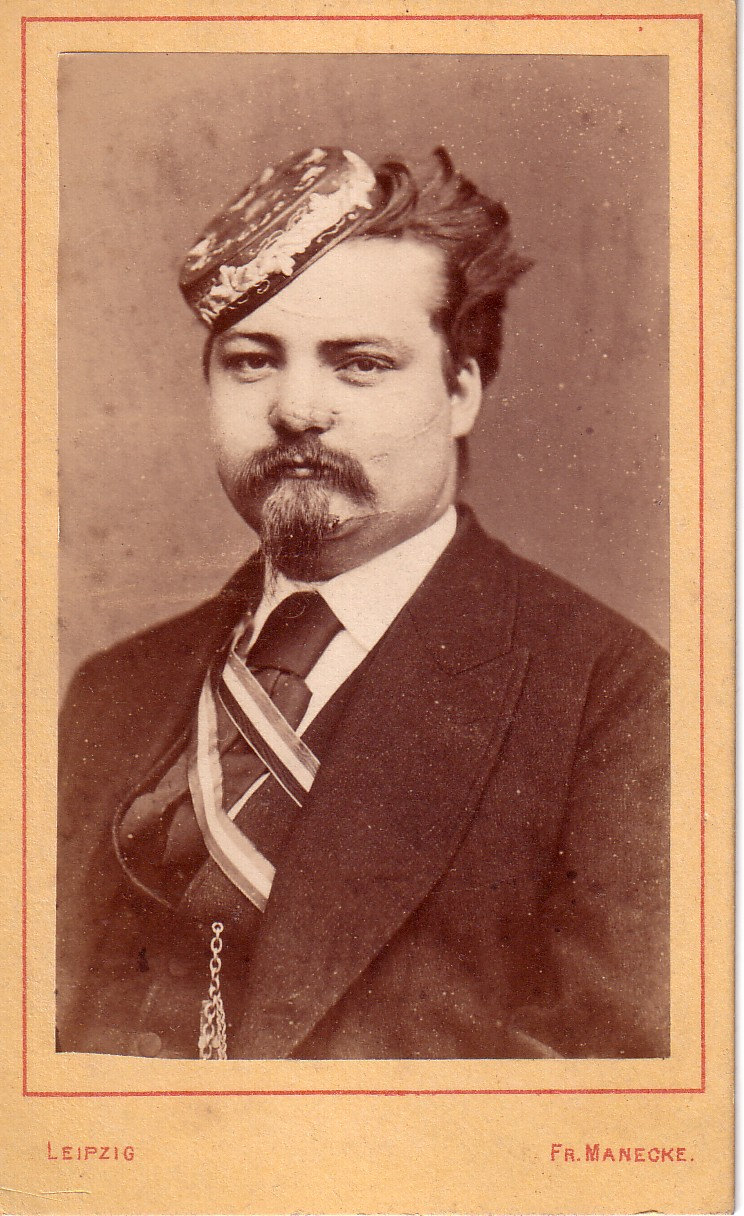
While a student at Leipzig University, Stone was a member of the Corps Thuringia Leipzig and gained the dueling scars seen here, c. 1870.

Samuel Hanson Stone was born in Madison County, Kentucky, to James Clifton and Matilda (Hanson) Stone. His father was a member of the first graduating class of Bethany College, received a law degree from Philadelphia Law School, and served as captain of a volunteer militia company raised for the Mexican–American War. His mother was the daughter of Winchester politician Samuel Hanson, who served in both chambers of the Kentucky General Assembly, and the sister of Roger Hanson. Samuel's great uncle was Thomas Stone, a founding father and signer of the Declaration of Independence.

In 1858, the family moved to Leavenworth, Kansas. An emancipationist and free-state Kansan, Stone's father was appointed as one of the state's four delegates to the Peace Conference of 1861, a meeting held in Washington D.C. in an effort to prevent secession. At the onset of the American Civil War, he was commissioned as a major general and given command of the state's militia forces.

In 1864, Stone attended the Lee High School in Massachusetts and started in 1866 with his study of jurisprudence at the University of Leipzig (located in Saxony, Germany). In January 1870, Stone relocated to Heidelberg, Germany where he became – after already becoming a member of the Corps Thuringia in Leipzig – a member of the Corps Rhenania Heidelberg. Within the same year Stone moved back to the U.S. where he started off as an assistant clerk at the Second National Bank in Leavenworth.

== Career ==
In 1874 Stone took residence in Madison County, Kentucky as a farmer and entrepreneur. Stone established 1876 close to Fort Estill Station a cattle farm and started to rear thoroughbred horses and rose to become the second biggest tobacco grower in the county.

From 1895 to 1899 Stone officiated as Auditor of Public Accounts for Kentucky. In 1899 he was defeated by the latter – controversial - office holder William S. Taylor (1853–1928) in the nomination campaign as candidate for the Republican Party for the office of Governor of Kentucky by a few votes.
