= Taylor v. Beckham =

- Supreme Court of the United States

Argued April 30 – May 1, 1900 Decided May 21, 1900
- Full case name: William S. Taylor and John Marshall, Plaintiffs in Err., v. J. C. W. Beckham Defendant in Err.
- Citations: 178 U.S. 548 (more) 20 S. Ct. 890; 20 S. Ct. 1009; 44 L. Ed. 1187

Case history
- Prior: 21 Ky. L. Rep. 1735, 56 S. W. 177

Holding
- Court refused to intervene in the case, claiming that no federal questions were at issue. The Kentucky Court of Appeals' decision in favor of Beckham was allowed to stand.

Court membership
- Chief Justice Melville Fuller Associate Justices John M. Harlan · Horace Gray; David J. Brewer · Henry B. Brown; George Shiras Jr. · Edward D. White; Rufus W. Peckham · Joseph McKenna

Case opinions
- Majority: Fuller, joined by Gray, Shiras, White, Peckham
- Concurrence: McKenna
- Concur/dissent: Brewer, joined by Brown
- Dissent: Harlan

Taylor v. Beckham, 178 U.S. 548 (1900), was a case heard before the Supreme Court of the United States on April 30 and May 1, 1900, to decide the outcome of the disputed Kentucky gubernatorial election of 1899. The litigants were Republican gubernatorial candidate William S. Taylor and Democratic lieutenant gubernatorial candidate J. C. W. Beckham. In the November 7, 1899, election, Taylor received 193,714 votes to Democrat William Goebel's 191,331. This result was certified by a 2–1 decision of the state's Board of Elections. Goebel challenged the election results on the basis of alleged voting irregularities, and the Democrat-controlled Kentucky General Assembly formed a committee to investigate Goebel's claims. Goebel was shot on January 30, 1900, one day before the General Assembly approved the committee's report declaring enough Taylor votes invalid to swing the election to Goebel. As he lay dying of his wounds, Goebel was sworn into office on January 31, 1900. He died on February 3, 1900, and Beckham ascended to the governorship.

Claiming the General Assembly's decision was invalid, Taylor sued to prevent Beckham from exercising the authority of the governor's office. Beckham countersued Taylor for possession of the state capitol and governor's mansion. The suits were consolidated and heard in Jefferson County circuit court, which claimed it had no authority to interfere with the method of deciding contested elections prescribed by the state constitution, an outcome that favored Beckham. The Kentucky Court of Appeals upheld the circuit court's decision on appeal and rejected Taylor's claim that he had been deprived of property without due process by stating that an elective office was not property and thus not protected by the Fourteenth Amendment.

The injection of Taylor's claim under the Fourteenth Amendment gave him grounds to appeal the decision to the U.S. Supreme Court. In a majority opinion delivered by Chief Justice Melville Fuller, the Supreme Court also rejected Taylor's claim to loss of property without due process and thus refused to intervene on Taylor's behalf, claiming that no federal issues were in question and the court lacked jurisdiction. Justices Gray, White, Shiras, and Peckham concurred with the majority opinion. Justice Joseph McKenna concurred with the decision to dismiss, but expressed reservations about the determination that an elected office was not property. Justice David J. Brewer, joined by Justice Henry B. Brown, contended that the Supreme Court did have jurisdiction, but concurred with the result in favor of Beckham. Kentuckian John Marshall Harlan authored the lone dissent from the majority opinion, claiming that the court did have jurisdiction and should have found in favor of Taylor based on his claim of loss of property without due process. He further argued that elective office fell under the definition of "liberty" as used in the Fourteenth Amendment and was protected by due process.

== Background ==
=== History ===
In 1898, the Kentucky General Assembly enacted a law which created a Board of Election Commissioners, appointed by the General Assembly, who were responsible for choosing election commissioners in all of Kentucky's counties. The board was empowered to examine election returns and certify the results. The power to decide the outcome of disputed elections remained with the General Assembly under Section 153 of the state constitution. The law was commonly referred to as the Goebel Election Law, a reference to its sponsor, President Pro Tempore of the Kentucky Senate William Goebel. Because the General Assembly was heavily Democratic and Goebel was considered a likely Democratic aspirant for the governorship in the 1899 election, the law was attacked as blatantly partisan and self-serving. Republicans organized a test case against the law, but the Kentucky Court of Appeals upheld it as constitutional.

Goebel secured the Democratic nomination for governor at a contentious nominating convention. Despite the nominations of two minor party candidates – including that of former governor John Y. Brown by a dissident faction of Democrats – the race centered on Goebel and his Republican opponent, Attorney General William S. Taylor. The results of the election were too close to call for several days. Before the official results could be announced, charges of voting irregularities began. In Nelson County, 1,200 ballots listed the Republican candidate as "W. P. Taylor" instead of "W. S. Taylor"; Democrats claimed these votes should be invalidated. In Knox and Johnson counties, voters complained of "thin tissue ballots" that allowed the voter's choices to be seen through them. In the city of Louisville, Democrats charged that the militia had intimidated voters there and that the entire city's vote should be invalidated.

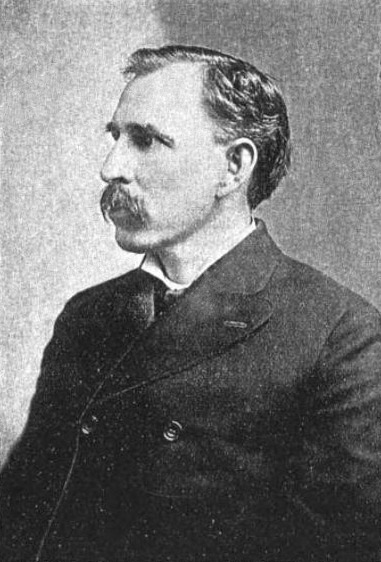
William S. Taylor was declared the winner of the election.

When the official tally was announced, Taylor had won by a vote of 193,714 to 191,331. Though the Board of Elections was thought to be controlled by Goebel allies, it voted 2–1 to certify the announced vote tally. The board's majority opinion claimed that they did not have any judicial power and were thus unable to hear proof or swear witnesses. Taylor was inaugurated on December 12, 1899. Goebel announced his decision to contest the board's decision to the General Assembly. The Assembly appointed a committee to investigate the allegations contained in the challenges. The members of the committee were drawn at random, though the drawing was likely rigged – only one Republican joined ten Democrats on the committee. (Chance dictated that the committee should have contained four or five Republicans.) Among the rules the General Assembly adopted for the contest committee were: that the committee report at the pleasure of the General Assembly, that debate be limited once the findings were presented, and that the report be voted on in a joint session of the Assembly. The rules further provided that the speaker of the House preside over the joint session instead of the lieutenant governor, as was customary. The Republican minority fought the provisions, but the Democratic majority passed them despite the opposition.

Republicans around the state expected the committee to recommend disqualification of enough ballots to make Goebel governor. Armed men from heavily Republican eastern Kentucky filled the capital. On the morning of January 30, 1900, as Goebel and two friends walked toward the capitol building, shots were fired, and Goebel fell wounded. After being denied entrance to the state capitol by armed men, the contest committee met in Frankfort's city hall and, by a strict party-line vote, adopted a majority report that claimed Goebel and Beckham had received the most legitimate votes and should be installed in their respective offices. When Democratic legislators attempted to convene to approve the committee's report, they found the doors to the state capitol and other public locations in Frankfort blocked by armed citizens. On January 31, 1900, they convened secretly in a Frankfort hotel, with no Republicans present, and voted to certify the findings of the contest committee, invalidating enough votes to make Goebel governor. Still lying on his sick bed, Goebel took the oath of office.

Goebel died of his wounds on February 3, 1900. Leaders from both parties drafted an agreement whereby Taylor and his Lieutenant Governor, John Marshall, would step down from their respective offices, allowing Goebel's lieutenant governor, J. C. W. Beckham, to assume the governorship; in exchange, Taylor and Marshall would receive immunity from prosecution in any actions they may have taken with regard to Goebel's assassination. The militia would withdraw from Frankfort, and the Goebel Election Law would be repealed and replaced with a fairer election law. Despite his allies' insistence, Taylor refused to sign the agreement.

=== Lower court decisions ===
As negotiations for a peaceful resolution of the elections for governor and lieutenant governor were ongoing, the Republican candidates for the state's minor offices filed suit in federal court in Cincinnati, Ohio, to prevent their removal from office. The case could have been filed in the federal court at Louisville, Kentucky, but Judge Walter Evans asked to be excused from adjudicating the case. The Republican officers, represented by ex-Governor William O'Connell Bradley and future governor Augustus E. Willson among others, argued that the Goebel Election Law deprived citizens of their right to vote. The right to vote, they claimed, was inherent in the Fourteenth Amendment's guarantee of "liberty", and could not be taken from any citizen without due process.

The case was argued before Judge (and later President) William Howard Taft, who held that the federal court could not prevent the removal of officers by injunction. He advised the Republicans to seek remedy quo warranto in the state courts. Taft further opined that, should any federal question be raised in such proceedings, the officers could seek remedy in a federal court on appeal. The Republicans were encouraged by Taft's decision, which cleared the way for an appeal all the way to the federal Supreme Court if a federal question could be raised.

The Republican minor officeholders returned to the state courts with their case. Franklin County circuit court justice James E. Cantrill ruled against them, and the Kentucky Court of Appeals, then the state's court of last resort, sustained Cantrill's ruling by a vote of 4–3. Republican Attorney General Clifton J. Pratt continued with legal challenges and finally was allowed to serve out his term. Though Cantrill's decision was based on the invalidation of Louisville's vote and the votes of four counties in eastern Kentucky, none of the legislators from those areas were unseated.

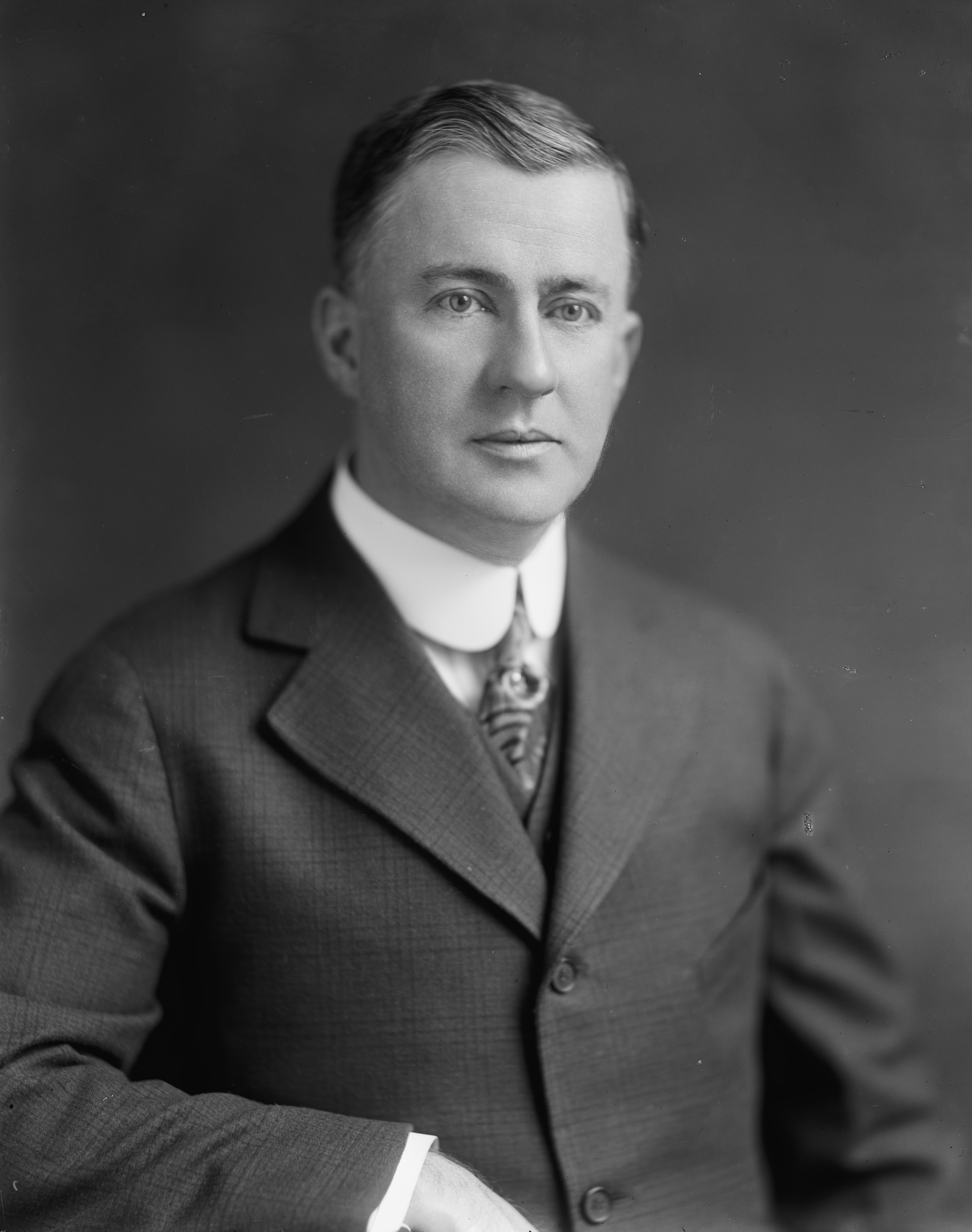
J. C. W. Beckham challenged Taylor for the governorship after Goebel's death.

Taft's ruling had no bearing on the cases of Governor Taylor and Lieutenant Governor Marshall except to spell out a means for them to take their cases to the federal courts, if necessary. On the same day that Taft's ruling was issued, Taylor filed suit in Jefferson County circuit court against Beckham and Adjutant General John Breckinridge Castleman to prevent them from exercising any authority due the offices they claimed. Unaware of Taylor's suit, Beckham filed suit against Taylor for possession of the capitol and executive building in Franklin County circuit court – a court believed to be favorable to the Democratic cause. Marshall also filed suit against Beckham and state senator L. H. Carter to prevent them from exercising any authority in the state senate, where the lieutenant governor was the presiding officer.

Republicans claimed that Taylor's suit, by virtue of having been filed two hours before Beckham's, gave the case precedence in Louisville. By mutual consent, the parties consolidated the suits, which were heard before Judge Emmet Field in Jefferson County circuit court. Both sides knew that Field's decision, whatever it might be, would be appealed, but both agreed to abide by the outcome of the final court's decision. The case was heard on March 1 and 2, 1900. Taylor's attorney's contended that the General Assembly had acted in a quasi-judicial manner, violating the principle of separation of powers. Further, because the contest committee's report did not specify how many votes were invalid, Republicans argued that all 150,000 votes cast in the contested counties had been invalidated by the General Assembly's vote, and consequently, the voters of those counties had been illegally disenfranchised. The most the Assembly should have been able to do, they claimed, was to invalidate the entire election. Finally, they contended that the alleged illegal activities of the General Assembly had deprived Taylor and Marshall of their property rights – the "property" in question being the offices they claimed – and their liberty to hold an elected office. Attorneys for Beckham contended that legislative actions historically had not been subject to judicial review, and indeed were not subject to such under any provision of the state constitution.

On March 10, 1900, Field sided with the Democrats. In his ruling, he opined that legislative actions "must be taken as absolute" and that the court did not have the authority to circumvent the legislative record. Republicans appealed the decision to the Kentucky Court of Appeals. In their appeal, they were careful to raise a federal issue. If Judge Field's ruling was correct, and the Board of Elections, the General Assembly, or both had the right under the state constitution to an absolute review of all elections, then the Assembly had been given absolute arbitrary power over elections, in conflict with the federal constitution.

On April 6, 1900, the Court of Appeals upheld Judge Field's decision by a vote of 6–1. The majority opinion held that an elected office is not property and thus not subject to the protections guaranteed in the Fourteenth Amendment. As a creation of the Kentucky Constitution, the court held, any elective office is conferred and held only subject to the provisions of that constitution. This put the matter beyond the reach of any judicial review, according to the court.

The four Democratic judges concurred on the majority opinion. Two Republican judges, in a separate opinion, concurred with the majority opinion, but declared that Taylor and Marshall had been done an irreparable injustice. The lone dissent, authored by the court's third Republican, held that the contest board had acted outside its legal authority. Republicans turned to the Supreme Court of the United States as their final option.

== Supreme Court ==
Louisville attorney Helm Bruce opened the Republicans' case before the Supreme Court on April 1, 1900. He maintained that, after Taylor's election had been certified by the Board of Elections, he was legally the governor of Kentucky, and the attempt by the legislature to oust him from office amounted to an arbitrary and despotic use of power, not a due process, as the federal constitution required. In addressing the complaints upon which the dismissal of ballots was justified – namely, the intimidation of voters in Jefferson County by the state militia and the use of "thin ballots" in forty Kentucky counties – Bruce maintained that even if the allegations were true, both were the fault of the state, not Taylor and Marshall, and were not sufficient grounds upon which to deny them their right to the offices they claimed.

Bruce was followed by Lawrence N. Maxwell, counsel for Beckham. Maxwell reiterated that the General Assembly had acted within its enumerated powers under the state constitution in deciding the outcome of the disputed election. He claimed that the decision of the state court of appeals made it clear that Taylor had not been legally elected governor, and therefore never possessed the property he was now claiming had been taken from him without due process. Maxwell further asserted that this disposed of any federal questions with regard to the case, and that the Supreme Court could claim no jurisdiction. The decision of the state court of appeals should be allowed to stand, he concluded. Lewis McQuown further argued on behalf of Beckham that, even if Taylor's claim to the governorship were legitimate, the investigation and decision by the General Assembly's contest committee represented sufficient due process. He acknowledged that the Goebel Election Law's provision that the legislature be the arbiter of any contested gubernatorial election differed little if at all from provisions in as many as twenty other states. If the Goebel Election Law was constitutional, as it had before been declared, then the Supreme Court had no jurisdiction regarding how it had been administered.

When Maxwell concluded his argument, ex-Governor Bradley spoke on Taylor's behalf. After reiterating Taylor's legal claim to the office of governor, he answered the question of jurisdiction by citing Thayer v. Boyd, a similar case in which the court had assumed jurisdiction. He further quoted authorities who opined that an elected office was property, using this to contend that Taylor's rights under the Fourteenth Amendment had been violated, thus giving the court jurisdiction. Also, Bradley asserted, the election of some members of the Assembly's contest committee would hinge on the decision of that very committee. At least one member of the committee was known to have wagered on the election's outcome. These facts should have nullified the decision of the committee and the Assembly on the grounds that it had left some members as judges of their own cases. Finally, Bradley cited irregularities in the proceedings of the contest committee, including insufficient time given for the review of testimony provided in written form by Taylor and Marshall's legal representation. Following Bradley's argument, the court recessed until May 14, 1900.

=== Opinion of the Court ===
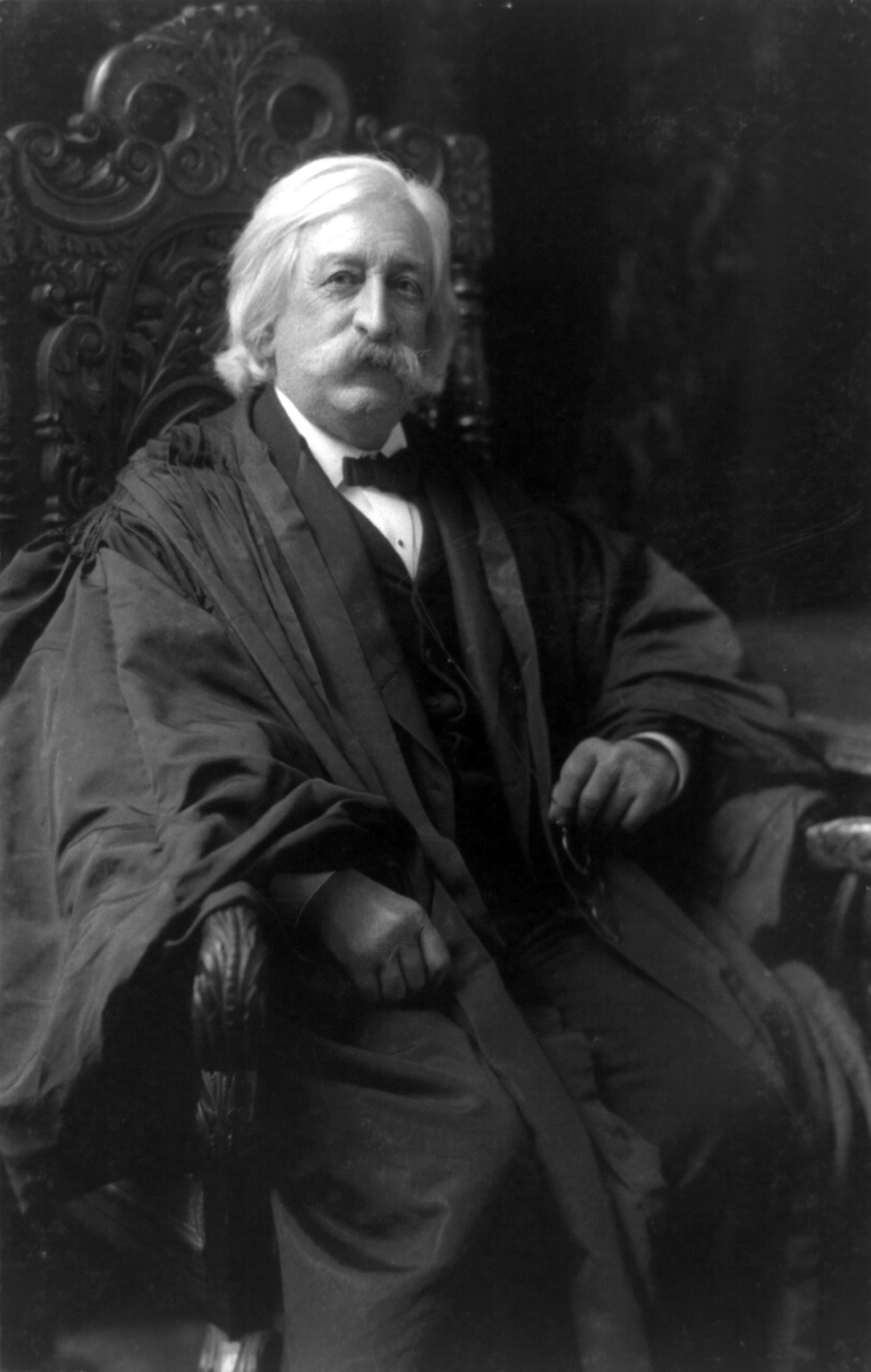
Chief Justice Melville Fuller delivered the majority opinion.

Chief Justice Melville Fuller delivered the opinion of the court on May 21, 1900. This opinion held that there were no federal issues in question in the case, and that the court lacked jurisdiction. The opinion affirmed the state court of appeals' assertion that an elective office was not property. Justices Gray, White, Shiras, and Peckham concurred with the majority opinion.

In his 1910 book, The Constitutional Law of the United States, Westel W. Willoughby noted that the court's ruling that an elective office was not property was at odds with previous decisions in which it had assumed jurisdiction in cases between two contestants for an office to determine if due process was granted. By assuming jurisdiction in these cases, Willoughby claimed, the court had given elective offices standing as property. Accordingly, Justice Joseph McKenna issued a separate concurring opinion in which he stated: "I agree fully with those decisions which are referred to [in the majority opinion], and which hold that as between the State and the office holder there is no contract right either to the term of office or to the amount of salary, and that the legislature may, if not restrained by constitutional provisions, abolish the office or reduce the salary. But when the office is not disturbed, when the salary is not changed, and when, under the Constitution of the State, neither can be by the legislature, and the question is simply whether one shall be deprived of that office and its salary, and both given to another, a different question is presented, and in such a case to hold that the incumbent has no property in the office, with its accompanying salary, does not commend itself to my judgment."

=== Dissent of Justice Brewer ===
Justice David J. Brewer issued a dissent stating that he believed that due process had been observed and that the majority opinion should have affirmed the lower court rulings rather than dismissing the case. In his opinion, Brewer stated: "[A]s I understand the law, this court has jurisdiction to review a judgment of the highest court of a State ousting one from his office and giving it to another, and a right to inquire whether that judgment is right or wrong in respect to any federal question such as due process of law, I think the writ of error should not be dismissed, but that the judgment of the Court of Appeals of Kentucky should be affirmed." Justice Henry B. Brown concurred with Brewer.

=== Dissent of Justice Harlan ===
The only dissent came from Kentuckian John Marshall Harlan. Harlan opined that not only did the court have jurisdiction, it should have sustained the writ of error on the grounds that the General Assembly's actions had deprived Taylor and Marshall of property without due process, in violation of the Fourteenth Amendment. Going beyond the claim that an elective office is property, Harlan wrote that the right to hold office fell within the definition of "liberty" as used in the Fourteenth Amendment. Justifying this claim, Harlan wrote: "What more directly involves the liberty of the citizen than to be able to enter upon the discharge of the duties of an office to which he has been lawfully elected by his fellow citizens?"

Whereas the majority opinion wholly ignored the proceedings of the General Assembly as irrelevant (the court lacking jurisdiction) and Brewer and Brown affirmed them, Harlan excoriated the legislature in his dissent. "Looking into the record before us, I find such action taken by the body claiming to be organized as the lawful legislature of Kentucky as was discreditable in the last degree and unworthy of the free people whom it professed to represent. ... Those who composed that body seemed to have shut their eyes against the proof for fear that it would compel them to respect the popular will as expressed at the polls." He also expressed disbelief at the majority opinion: "[T]he overturning of the public will, as expressed at the ballot box, without evidence or against evidence, in order to accomplish partisan ends, is a crime against free government, and deserves the execration of all lovers of liberty. ... I cannot believe that the judiciary is helpless in the presence of such a crime."

== Subsequent developments ==
Taylor v. Beckham established as a judicial principle that public offices are mere agencies or trusts, and not property protected by the Fourteenth Amendment. The U.S. Court of Appeals for the Second Circuit in 2005 stated that the Supreme Court subsequently had adopted a more expansive approach to identifying "property" within the meaning of the Fourteenth Amendment, but that it is the Supreme Court's prerogative alone to overrule one of its precedents.
