= James Hilary Mulligan =

American politician

James H. Mulligan

Member of the Kentucky Senate from the 27th district
- In office August 5, 1889 – January 1, 1894
- Preceded by: Mitchell Cary Alford
- Succeeded by: J. H. Holloway

Member of the Kentucky House of Representatives from Lexington
- In office August 1, 1881 – August 5, 1889
- Preceded by: T. J. Bush
- Succeeded by: George B. Kinkead

Personal details
- Party: Democratic

James Hilary Mulligan (November 21, 1844 – July 1, 1915) was a judge, politician, and poet from Kentucky.

== Biography ==
Mulligan was born in Lexington, Kentucky, son of the locally prominent businessman Dennis Mulligan and Ellen Alice (McCoy) Mulligan. He graduated from St. Mary's College (Collège Sainte-Marie de Montréal) in 1864 and received his law degree from Kentucky University (now Transylvania University) in 1869.

Judge Mulligan was an editor, attorney, judge, legislator (Kentucky House 1881–1889 and Senate 1889–1893), consul-general to Samoa (1894–1896), and orator. While in Samoa, he befriended Scottish novelist Robert Louis Stevenson. Mulligan was himself an editor and poet. His poem "In Kentucky" is perhaps the best known poem about the state, which he delivered at the close of a speech at the Phoenix Hotel in Lexington in 1902.

He married Mary Huston Jackson in 1869 and they had four children. Mary Mulligan died in 1876. Judge Mulligan married Genevieve Morgan Williams in 1881 and they had six children.

His home, Maxwell Place, is now the official residence of the president of the University of Kentucky. He is buried in Calvary Cemetery in Lexington.
