= Bradford County Jail =

Jail in Pennsylvania, United States

Coordinates: 41.7662°N 76.4438°W

The Bradford County Jail served as the jail in Bradford County, Pennsylvania from 1873 to 1991. It was located in Towanda, Pennsylvania.

The building is now home to the Bradford County Museum.

== History ==
In 1871, a new jail was needed for Bradford County, because the previous jail was located in the basement of the courthouse. It was constructed from 1871 to 1873. The land was purchased from the widow of Dr. E.H. Manson, after the house on the property burned down in a fire. The new jail was designed by Avery Frink, the architect of the Susquehanna County jail. The county commissioners decided to build the jail themselves, under the supervision of Frink, instead of contracting work. Construction of the massive stone building began in 1871 and was finally completed two years later in 1873. m The first prisoners were moved in on August 14, 1873. The front section of the building was the home of sheriff J. Monroe Smith and his family. During the jails 118-year operation, it housed a variety of prisoners, both male and female. After the jail was determined in 1991 to be in a rapidly deteriorating state, the county decided that a new, larger, and more modern jail would be built.

== Museum ==
In 1998, the county commissioners voted to transfer the property to the Bradford County Historical Society. The Bradford County Museum offers three floors of exhibits and activities presenting the history of the county. Through the exhibits, visitors are able to see and learn about the life in Bradford County, from the early days to the present. The museum holds artifacts on early settler's household and, early industrial displays, paintings and photo boards, and military objects all representing the county's heritage.
