= William Jackson Worthington =

American politician

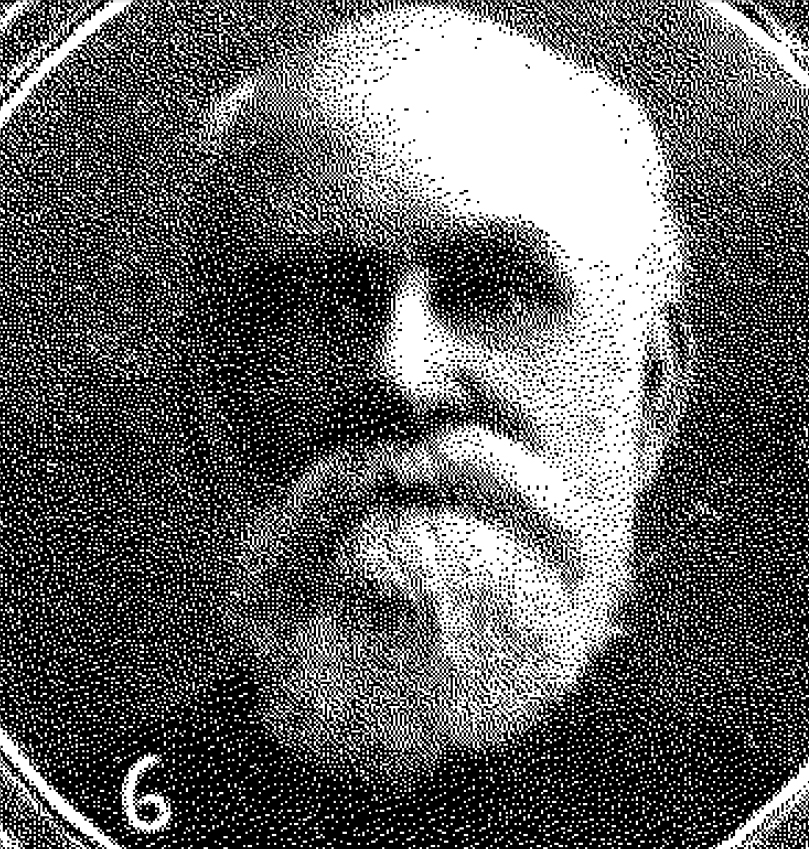

26th Lieutenant Governor of Kentucky
- In office December 10, 1895 – December 12, 1899
- Governor: William O. Bradley
- Preceded by: Mitchell Cary Alford
- Succeeded by: John Marshall

Member of the Kentucky House of Representatives
- In office January 1, 1902 – January 1, 1906
- Preceded by: Benjamine F. Meadows
- Succeeded by: C. W. G. Hannah
- Constituency: 99th district
- In office August 3, 1885 – August 1, 1887
- Preceded by: John T. King
- Succeeded by: W. J. A. Rardin
- Constituency: Greenup County

Member of the Kentucky Senate from the 32nd district
- In office August 7, 1865 – August 2, 1869
- Preceded by: Martin P. Marshall
- Succeeded by: K. F. Prichard

Personal details
- Born: November 9, 1833 Cambria County, Pennsylvania, U.S.
- Died: May 22, 1914 (aged 80) Boyd County, Kentucky, U.S.
- Party: Unconditional Union (1865); Republican
- Spouse(s): Catherine Steele (d. 1889); Lucy York
- Children: 7

William Jackson Worthington (November 9, 1833 – May 22, 1914) served in the Union Army during the American Civil War, was a state senator, and served as the 26th lieutenant governor of Kentucky under Governor William O. Bradley from 1895 to 1899. He was born in Pennsylvania and died in Boyd County, Kentucky.

== Early life ==
Worthington was born near Johnstown, Pennsylvania, but spent his childhood in Ohio. He came to Kentucky with his parents as a teenager, and served in the 22nd Kentucky Infantry Regiment of the Union Army during the American Civil War. He was commissioned captain of the Company B of the regiment, and was later promoted to the ranks of major and lieutenant colonel. Worthington was present during the Siege of Vicksburg and the Battle of Cumberland Gap. He was under the command of Ambrose Burnside during the Red River Campaign and at the Capture of New Orleans.

After the conflict's end, Colonel Worthington returned to his home in Greenup County, Kentucky and purchased a furnace in the Hanging Rock Iron Field. He was actively involved in the iron business for about fifteen years.

== Career ==
Worthington was prominent and influential in local affairs during his lifetime. He served one term as county judge of Greenup, Kentucky.

In 1895 he was elected lieutenant governor of the state. In 1896, Worthington pardoned one of the axe murderers involved in a horrific attack on a family of African Americans (Blyew v. United States). Worthington granted the pardon due to doubts over the evidence used to convict the man.

Worthington served several terms in the General Assembly before and after his tenure as lieutenant governor. In 1865, he was elected as a member of the Unconditional Union Party to the 32nd Senate district, which comprised Boyd, Carter, Greenup, and Lawrence Counties. In 1885, he was elected to represent Greenup County in the Kentucky House of Representatives. He was later reelected to the house in 1901 and 1903.

== Legacy ==
The city of Worthington, Kentucky was named after Worthington, being built by his daughters upon land inherited from the Colonel.

Political offices
Preceded by Mitchell Cary Alford	Lieutenant Governor of Kentucky; 1895–1899	Succeeded by John Marshall
