= William S. Taylor (Kentucky politician) =

American politician (1853–1928)

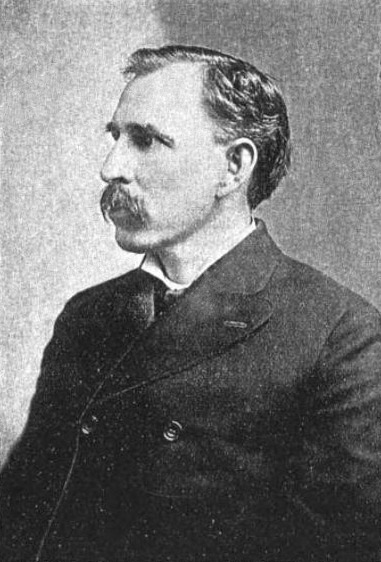

33rd Governor of Kentucky
- In office December 12, 1899 – January 31, 1900
- Lieutenant: John Marshall
- Preceded by: William O. Bradley
- Succeeded by: William Goebel

19th Attorney General of Kentucky
- In office 1896–1899
- Governor: William O. Bradley
- Preceded by: W. J. Hendricks
- Succeeded by: R. J. Breckinridge

Personal details
- Born: William Sylvester Taylor; October 10, 1853 Butler County, Kentucky, U.S.
- Died: August 2, 1928 (aged 74) Indianapolis, Indiana, U.S.
- Resting place: Crown Hill Cemetery and Arboretum, Section 2, Lot 44
- Party: Republican
- Spouse(s): Sara Tanner; Norah A. Meyers
- Occupation: Politician; lawyer; farmer; teacher

William Sylvester Taylor (October 10, 1853 – August 2, 1928) was an American politician who was the 33rd governor of Kentucky. He was initially declared the winner of the disputed gubernatorial election of 1899, but the Kentucky General Assembly, dominated by the Democrats, reversed the election results, giving the victory to his Democratic opponent, William Goebel. Thus, Taylor served only 50 days as governor.

A poorly educated but politically astute lawyer, Taylor began climbing the political ladder by holding local offices in his native Butler County. Though he was a Republican in an overwhelmingly Democratic state, divisions in the majority party resulted in his election as Attorney General of Kentucky on a ticket with the Commonwealth's first Republican governor, William O. Bradley. Four years later, Taylor was elected in 1899 to the governorship.

When the General Assembly reversed the election results after a dispute, incensed Republicans armed themselves and descended on Frankfort. Taylor's Democratic opponent, William Goebel, was shot and died after being sworn in on his deathbed. Taylor exhausted his finances in a legal battle with Goebel's running mate J. C. W. Beckham over the governorship. Taylor ultimately lost the battle, and was implicated in Goebel's assassination. He fled to neighboring Indiana. Despite eventually being pardoned for any wrongdoing, he seldom returned to Kentucky. Taylor died in Indianapolis, Indiana in 1928.

== Early life ==
William Taylor was born October 10, 1853, in a log cabin on the Green River, about five miles from Morgantown, Kentucky. He was the first child of Sylvester and Mary G. (Moore) Taylor. He spent his early years working on the family farm, and did not attend school until age fifteen; thereafter, he attended the public schools of Butler County and studied at home. In 1874, he began teaching, specializing in mathematics, history, and politics. He taught until 1882, and later became a successful attorney, but continued to operate a farm.

On February 10, 1878, Taylor married Sara ("Sallie") Belle Tanner. The couple had nine children, including six daughters and a son that survived infancy.

== Political career ==
Taylor's political career began in 1878 with an unsuccessful bid to become county clerk of Butler County. In 1880, he was an assistant presidential elector for Greenback candidate James Weaver. Two years later, he was elected county clerk of Butler County. He was the first person in the history of the county to successfully challenge a Democrat for this position.

Taylor became a member of the Republican Party in 1884. In 1886, he was chosen to represent the third district on the Republican state central committee. That same year, the party nominated a full slate of candidates for county offices, including Taylor as the nominee for county judge. In the ensuing elections, the full Republican slate was elected. Taylor was a delegate to the Republican National Convention in 1888. He was re-elected as county judge in 1890.

In 1895, Taylor was elected Attorney General of Kentucky, and served until 1899. During his term, state senator William Goebel proposed an election law that created a state Board of Elections which was empowered to appoint all election officers in every county and certify all election results. The board was to be appointed by the General Assembly, and there were no requirements that its composition be bi-partisan. The law was widely seen as a power play by Goebel, designed to ensure Democratic victories in state elections, including Goebel's own anticipated run for governor. The law passed the General Assembly, but was vetoed by Republican governor William O. Bradley. The General Assembly promptly overrode the veto. As attorney general, Taylor opined that the bill was unconstitutional. The measure was adjudicated by the Kentucky Court of Appeals and found to be constitutional.

=== Gubernatorial election of 1899 ===
Bradley's election in 1895 had marked the first time in Kentucky's history that the Commonwealth had elected a Republican governor. Angry Democrats, who had controlled the governorship since the fall of the Whig Party in 1855, sought to regain what they had lost. Bitter divisions in the party led to a contentious convention that nominated William Goebel as the party candidate. A faction of the Democratic Party held a second nominating convention and chose former governor John Y. Brown as their nominee.

The Republicans were initially no less divided than the Democrats. Senator William J. Deboe backed Taylor for governor. Governor Bradley backed Judge Clifton J. Pratt of Hopkins County, and the Republicans of Central Kentucky backed state auditor Sam H. Stone. Taylor organized a strong political machine and seemed in a solid position to obtain the nomination. Bradley was incensed that the party would not unite behind his candidate and boycotted the convention. Taylor unsuccessfully tried to woo him back with a promise to make his nephew, Edwin P. Morrow, secretary of state. Because Taylor represented the western part of the state, the so-called "lily white" branch of the Republican Party, black leaders also threatened not to support him; Taylor responded by hiring one of the black leaders his permanent secretary, and promised to appoint other black leaders to office if he won the election. Seeing that Taylor's nomination was likely, all the other candidates withdrew, and Taylor won the nomination unanimously.

During the campaign, Taylor was attacked by Democratic opponents because of his party's support from black voters and its ties to big business, including the Louisville and Nashville Railroad. They also charged that Governor Bradley had run a corrupt administration. Republicans answered with charges of factionalism and use of political machinery by Democrats. In particular, they derided the Goebel Election Law, which Taylor claimed subverted the will of the people.

Ex-Confederates were usually a safe voting bloc for the Democrats, but many of them deserted Goebel because he had, in 1895, while cashing a check, met and quickly shot his main local political opponent, the esteemed banker and former Confederate colonel John Sandford, in what he declared was an act of self-defense, but some see as more of an (illegal) duel, as both fired pistols at each other. Sandford, who received a fatal head wound, was a grandson of Revolutionary War General and US Congressman Thomas Sandford. On the other hand, blacks had historically been a safe bloc for the Republicans, but Taylor had alienated many of them by not strongly opposing the Separate Coach Bill, which would have racially segregated railroad facilities. Goebel also risked losing support to minor party candidates. Besides John Y. Brown, the dissenting Democrats' nominee, the Populist Party nominated a candidate, drawing votes from Goebel's populist base. To unite his traditional base, Goebel convinced William Jennings Bryan, a hero to most populists and Democrats, to campaign for him. As soon as Bryan finished his tour of the state, Governor Bradley reversed course and began speaking in favor of Taylor. While Bradley insisted that his motives were to defend his administration, journalist Henry Watterson believed Taylor had promised to support Bradley's senatorial bid if elected.

=== Governorship and later life ===
In the general election, Taylor secured just 2,383 more votes than Goebel. The Democrat-controlled General Assembly challenged the election results. Under the Goebel Election Law, a three-man Board of Elections (dominated by Democrats) were to review the results and certify the winner in the contest. Two of the members of the board had openly campaigned for Goebel, and all three owed their appointments to him, but in a surprising decision, the board voted 2–1 to certify Taylor as the winner.

The board claimed that the Goebel Election Law did not give them the power to hear proof of vote fraud or call witnesses, although the wording of their decision implied that they would have invalidated Taylor votes if they had been empowered to do so. Taylor was inaugurated on December 12, 1899. Days later, the Democratic-dominated General Assembly convened in Frankfort. They claimed the power to decide disputed elections, and formed a partisan commission (ten Democrats and one Republican) to examine the election results.

Fearing Democrats in the Assembly would "steal" the election, armed men came to Frankfort from various areas of the state, primarily Eastern Kentucky, which was heavily Republican. On January 30, Goebel was shot while entering the state capitol building. Taylor declared a state of emergency and called out the militia. He called a special session of the legislature, holding it in heavily Republican London, Kentucky rather than the capital. Democrats refused to heed the call, and met in Democratic-dominated Louisville instead. They certified the election commission's report that disqualified enough Taylor votes for Goebel to be declared the winner of the election. Shortly after being sworn in as governor, Goebel died from the gunshot wound he had received days earlier.

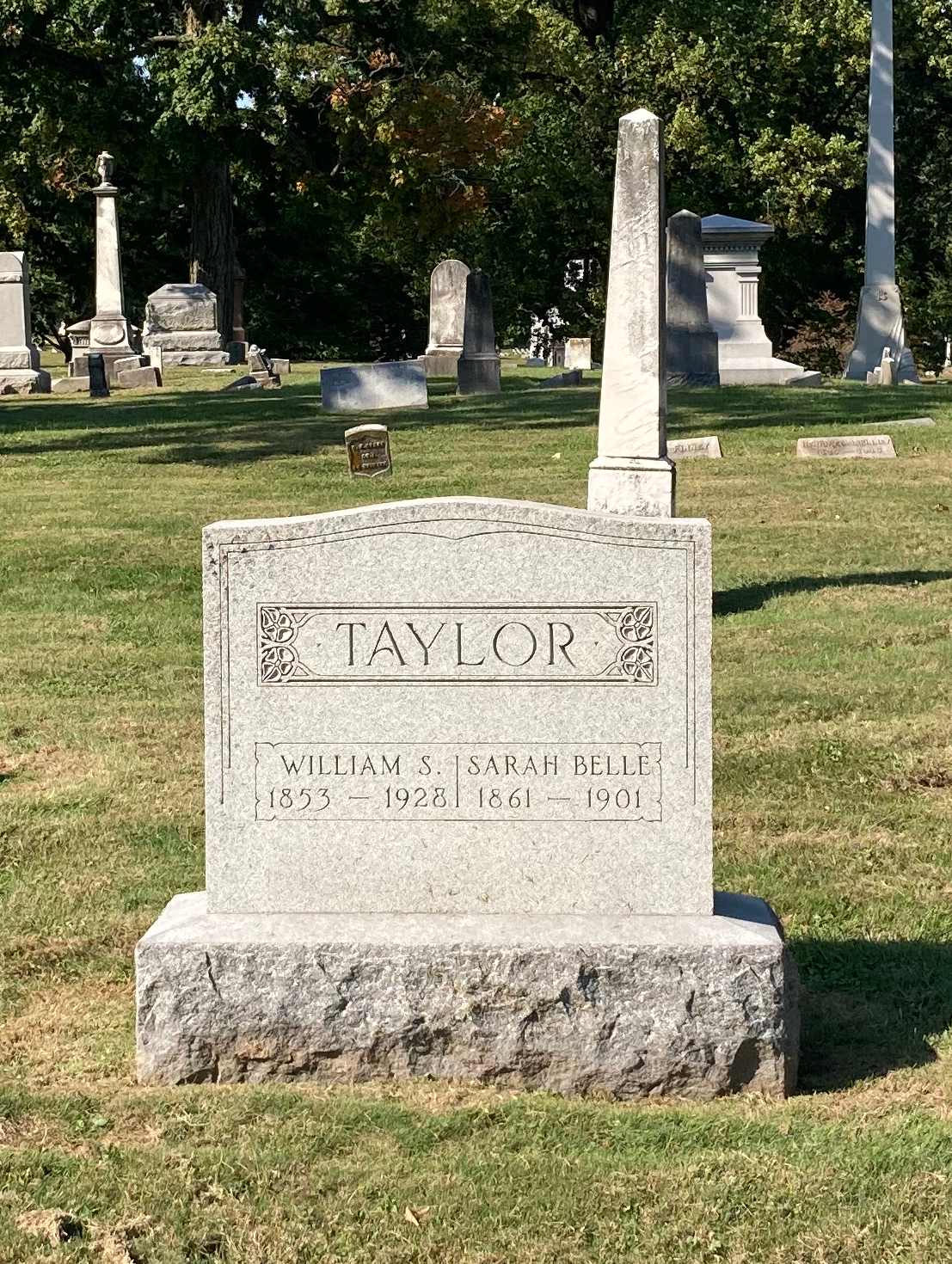
Taylor's grave at Crown Hill Cemetery

With Goebel dead, Democrats and Republicans met jointly and drafted a proposal to bring peace. Under terms of the proposal, Taylor and his lieutenant governor, John Marshall, would step down from their offices and be granted immunity from prosecution in the events surrounding the election and Goebel's assassination. The Goebel Election Law would be repealed, and the militia would disperse from Frankfort. Prominent leaders on both sides signed the agreement, but on February 10, 1900, Taylor announced he would not. The legislature convened on February 19, 1900, and agreed to put the election in the hands of the courts.

On March 10, 1900, the circuit court of Jefferson County upheld the General Assembly's actions that certified Goebel as governor. The case was appealed to the Kentucky Court of Appeals, then the court of last resort in Kentucky. On April 6, 1900, the Court of Appeals ruled 6–1 that Taylor had been legally unseated. Taylor appealed to the Supreme Court of the United States, and on May 21, 1900, the Court refused to hear the case. Only Kentuckian John Marshall Harlan dissented from this refusal. With Taylor's legal options exhausted, Goebel's lieutenant governor, J. C. W. Beckham, ascended to the governorship. During his short term as governor, Taylor had done little beyond making a few appointments and issuing a few pardons.

Taylor was indicted as an accessory in the assassination of Goebel. He fled to Indianapolis, where the governor refused to extradite him. At least one attempt to abduct him by force failed in 1901. Despite being pardoned in 1909 by Republican Governor Augustus E. Willson, Taylor seldom returned to Kentucky.

Financially strapped by the costs of challenging the election, Taylor became an insurance executive and practiced law. Shortly after arriving in Indiana, his wife died. In 1912, he briefly returned to Kentucky to marry Nora A. Myers. The couple returned to Indianapolis and had a son together. Taylor died of heart disease on August 2, 1928, and was buried at the Crown Hill Cemetery in Indianapolis.

== See also ==
- Taylor v. Beckham

Party political offices
| Preceded by William O'Connell Bradley | Republican nominee for Governor of Kentucky; 1899 | Succeeded by John W. Yerkes |
Legal offices
| Preceded by William J. Hendrick | Attorney General of Kentucky; 1896–1899 | Succeeded by R. J. Breckinridge |
Political offices
| Preceded by William O. Bradley | Governor of Kentucky; 1899–1900 | Succeeded by William Goebel |
