= Justus Goebel =

American tax attorney and tax-reform advocate (1858–1919)

- Goebel in 1912
- Born: July 21, 1858; Carbondale, Pennsylvania, U.S.
- Died: March 11, 1919 (aged 60); Cincinnati, Ohio, U.S.
- Resting place: Highland Cemetery; Covington, Kentucky, U.S.
- Spouse: Elizabeth Reynolds
- Children: 3
- Relatives: William J. Goebel (brother)

Justus Goebel, Sr. (July 21, 1858 – March 11, 1919) of Covington, Kentucky, was a Kentucky delegate to the 1912 Democratic National Convention and a tax-reform advocate. He was president of Lowry & Goebel.

== Biography ==
He was born on July 21, 1858, in Carbondale, Pennsylvania, to Wilhelm Goebel and Augusta Groenkle. He had brothers William J. Goebel and Arthur Goebel and sister Minnie Goebel Braunecker.

He married Elizabeth Reynolds and they had three children, Lieutenant Justus Goebel II (1892–1957); Captain William Arthur Goebel (born 1887), who both served in the American Expeditionary Forces; and Lilie Goebel Heusch, of Columbus, Ohio.

== Career ==
Goebel was a co-owner of the Lowry & Goebel carpet company.

A tax attorney, he was an advocate of tax reform in Kentucky and advocated for reevaluation of corporate assets. In a speech after his brother's assassination in 1900, Goebel accused corporate interests of being behind the crime and demanded that "The guilty in high places be uncovered, and justice be done to them."

His brother was assassinated in 1900, and in 1901 Goebel was indicted for bribery. In 1910 he moved to near Phoenix, Arizona, for health reasons.

He was a delegate to the 1912 Democratic National Convention from Kentucky. He died on March 11, 1919, in Cincinnati, Ohio, of the Spanish flu. Goebel was buried at Highland Cemetery in Covington.

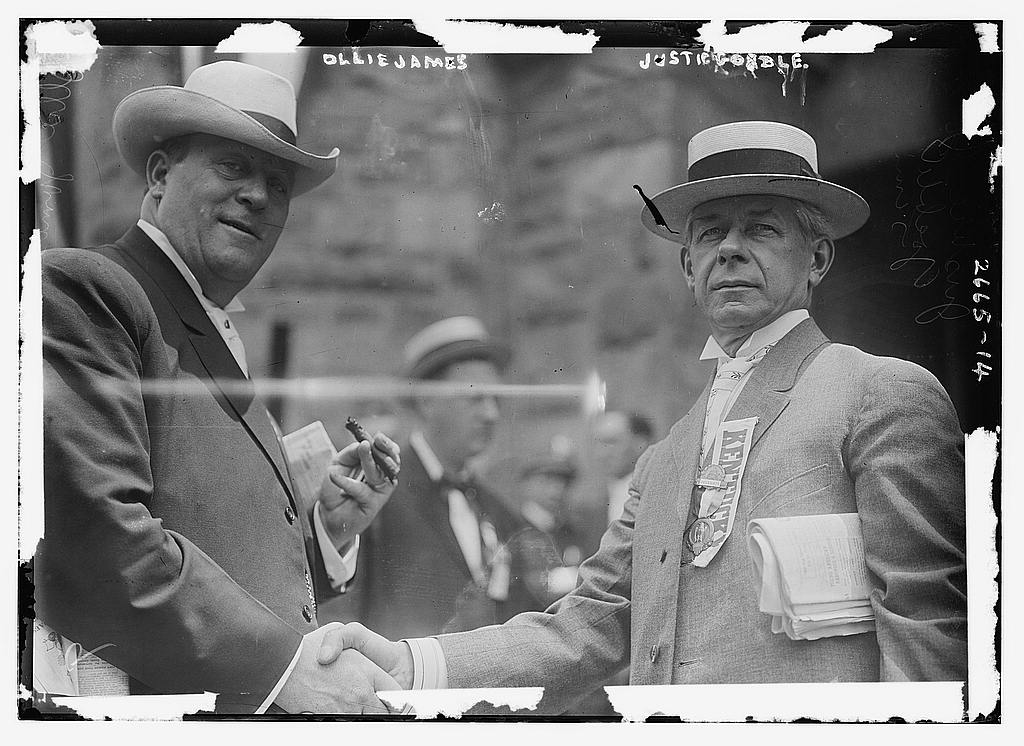
Ollie James and Goebel at the 1912 Democratic National Convention
