= John Marshall (Kentucky politician) =

American politician

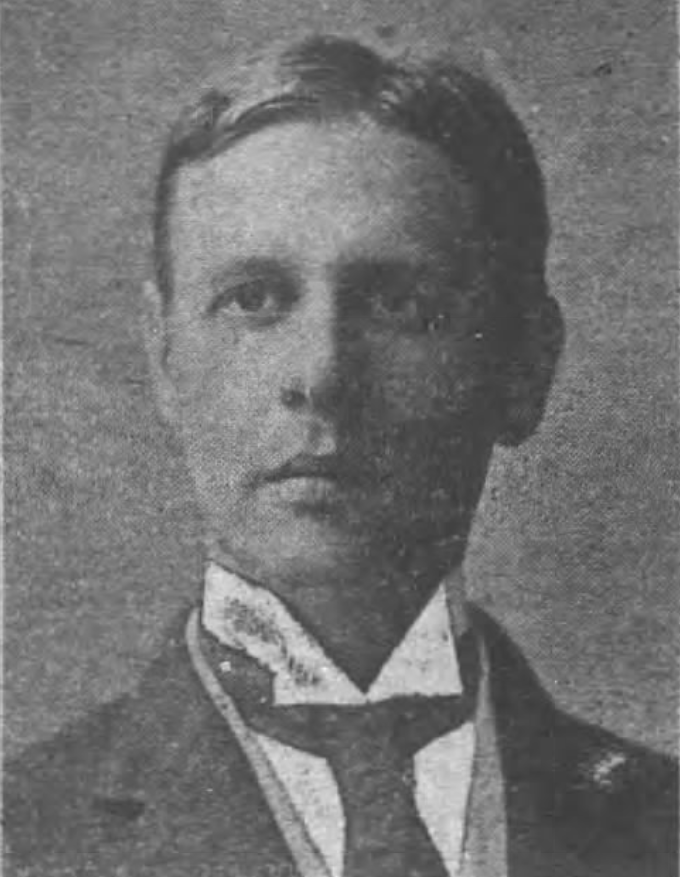
- Marshall, c. 1899

27th Lieutenant Governor of Kentucky
- In office December 12, 1899 – January 31, 1900
- Governor: William S. Taylor
- Preceded by: William Jackson Worthington
- Succeeded by: J. C. W. Beckham

Personal details
- Born: May 24, 1856 Louisville, Kentucky, U.S.
- Died: August 19, 1922 (aged 66) Anchorage, Kentucky, U.S.
- Party: Republican

John Marshall (May 24, 1856 – August 19, 1922) served as the 27th lieutenant governor of Kentucky under Governor William S. Taylor from 1899 to 1900. Both Governor Taylor and Lieutenant Governor Marshall were removed from office by a Supreme Court decision that ruled that William Goebel had rightly been elected governor in the contested 1899 election.

Political offices
Preceded by William Jackson Worthington	Lieutenant Governor of Kentucky; 1899–1900	Succeeded by J. C. W. Beckham
