= James William Bryan =

American politician

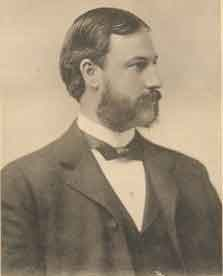

24th Lieutenant Governor of Kentucky
- In office August 30, 1887 – September 1, 1891
- Governor: Simon Bolivar Buckner
- Preceded by: James R. Hindman
- Succeeded by: Mitchell Cary Alford

Member of the Kentucky Senate from the 24th district
- In office August 3, 1885 – August 30, 1887
- Preceded by: T. F. Hallam
- Succeeded by: William Goebel

Personal details
- Born: June 9, 1853 Bourbon County, Kentucky, U.S.
- Died: April 8, 1903 (aged 49)
- Resting place: Cave Hill Cemetery
- Party: Democratic

James William Bryan (June 9, 1853 – April 8, 1903) was an American politician who served as the 24th lieutenant governor of Kentucky from 1887 to 1891.

He was born in Bourbon County, Kentucky in 1853. In 1887, he ran for, and was elected Lieutenant Governor of Kentucky, serving a full four-year term under Governor Simon B. Buckner.

== Sources ==
- The Political Graveyard: Index to Politicians: Bryan at politicalgraveyard.com

Political offices
Preceded by James Robert Hindman	Lieutenant Governor of Kentucky; 1883–1887	Succeeded by Mitchell Cary Alford
