= Mitchell Cary Alford =

American politician (1855–1914)

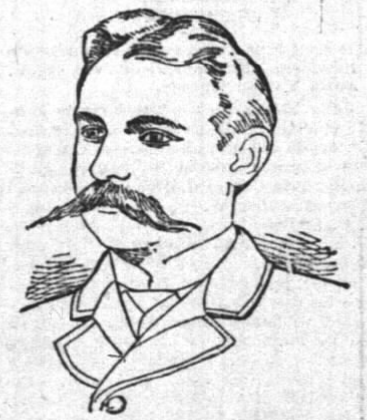
- Alford in 1891

25th Lieutenant Governor of Kentucky
- In office September 1, 1891 – December 10, 1895
- Governor: John Y. Brown
- Preceded by: James William Bryan
- Succeeded by: William Jackson Worthington

Member of the Kentucky Senate from the 27th district
- In office August 3, 1885 – August 5, 1889
- Preceded by: R. A. Spurr
- Succeeded by: James Hilary Mulligan

Personal details
- Born: July 10, 1855 Fayette County, Kentucky, U.S.
- Died: December 9, 1914 (aged 59)
- Resting place: Lexington Cemetery
- Party: Democratic
- Education: Transylvania University
- Profession: Lawyer

Mitchell Cary Alford (July 10, 1855 – December 9, 1914) was the 25th lieutenant governor of Kentucky.

== Early life ==
Mitchell Alford was born in Fayette County, Kentucky on July 10, 1856. He enrolled at Kentucky University (now Transylvania University), and graduated in 1877. He began studying law the following year, and earned a law degree with honors at Kentucky University in 1879. After graduation, he formed the law firm of Alford and Smith with Zachariah Frederick Smith, a college classmate.

== Political career ==
Two years after being admitted to the bar, he was appointed master commissioner of Fayette County. At the expiration of his four-year term, he was elected judge of the recorder's court in Lexington, Kentucky. He served a two-year term and was re-elected to a second term, but resigned in order to run for a seat in the Kentucky Senate.

Alford was elected to the Senate, representing the Lexington district. At the time of his election, he was the youngest member of the state senate. During the first session of his four-year term, he chaired the Senate Committee on Appropriations; during the second session, he chaired the Committee on Railroads.

At the 1891 Democratic nominating convention, Alford was nominated for the office of lieutenant governor without opposition. He was elected on a gubernatorial ticket with John Y. Brown. Following his four-year term, he was one of several Democratic candidates that sought to succeed Brown, but was unsuccessful in this endeavor due in part to his sound money stance during the party's split over Free Silver.

== Later life ==
Following the end of his term as lieutenant governor, Alford served several years as the chair of the state Democratic Central Committee. He was also president of the State League of Democratic Clubs. He helped organize the First National Bank of Middlesboro, Kentucky and was chosen its first president. He was a major stockholder in the Phoenix Hotel in Lexington, and eventually became its treasurer.

Political offices
Preceded by James William Bryan	Lieutenant Governor of Kentucky; 1891–1895	Succeeded by William Jackson Worthington
