= Bradford County Museum =

Museum in Towanda, Pennsylvania, United States

Coordinates: 41.7662°N 76.4438°W

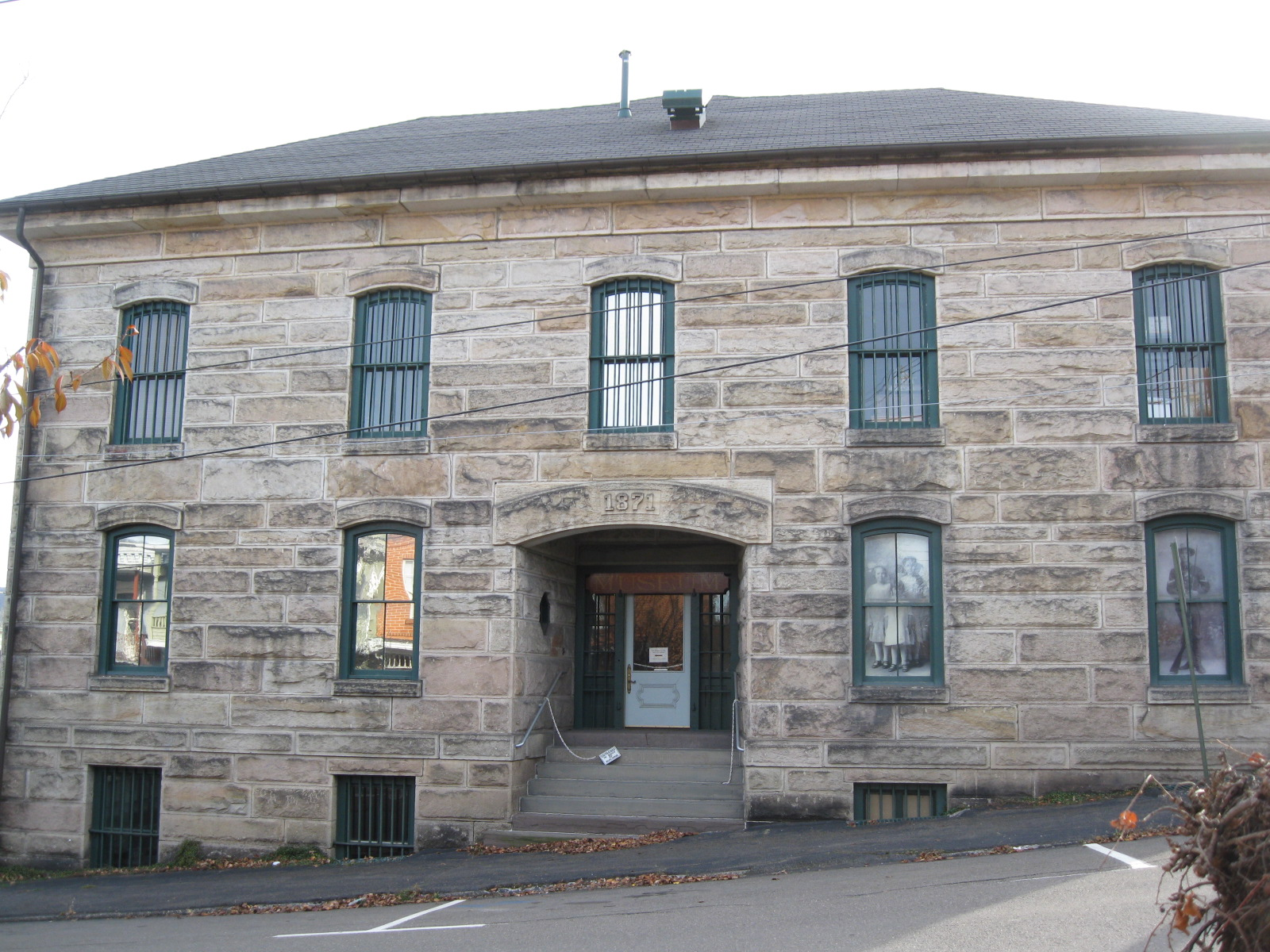
- Location: 109 Pine Street, Towanda, Pennsylvania
- Type: History museum with genealogical and historical research library
- Curator: Matt Carl

The Bradford County Museum is a local history museum in Towanda, Bradford County, Pennsylvania. Located in the building which previously housed the Bradford County Jail, it is owned and operated by the Bradford County Historical Society, which has been in operation since 1870.

== History ==
The museum offers two floors of exhibits in the former jail's cells related to county history from its early days to the present. Displays include early settler's household and farm equipment, area industry displays including coal mining and lumbering, medicine, glassware, transportation, textiles, a 1950s era jail cell and military objects.

The third floor features a genealogical and historical research library.

== Programs ==
Museum staff and volunteers collaborate with other organizations across the region to assist the Towanda Area School District with the planning and implementation of its annual Summer Academy, which enables at-risk students within the school district in grades nine through twelve "to regain credits lost and/or to complete remaining graduation requirements." In 2019, the program's ninth year of operation, five out of seven students successfully completed the program, which is funded through the Educational Improvement Tax Credit that is sponsored by regional businesses including Citizens and Northern Bank, First Citizens Bank, and UPMC.
