= Old State Capitol (Kentucky) =

- Old State House
- U.S. National Register of Historic Places
- U.S. National Historic Landmark
- U.S. Historic district – Contributing property
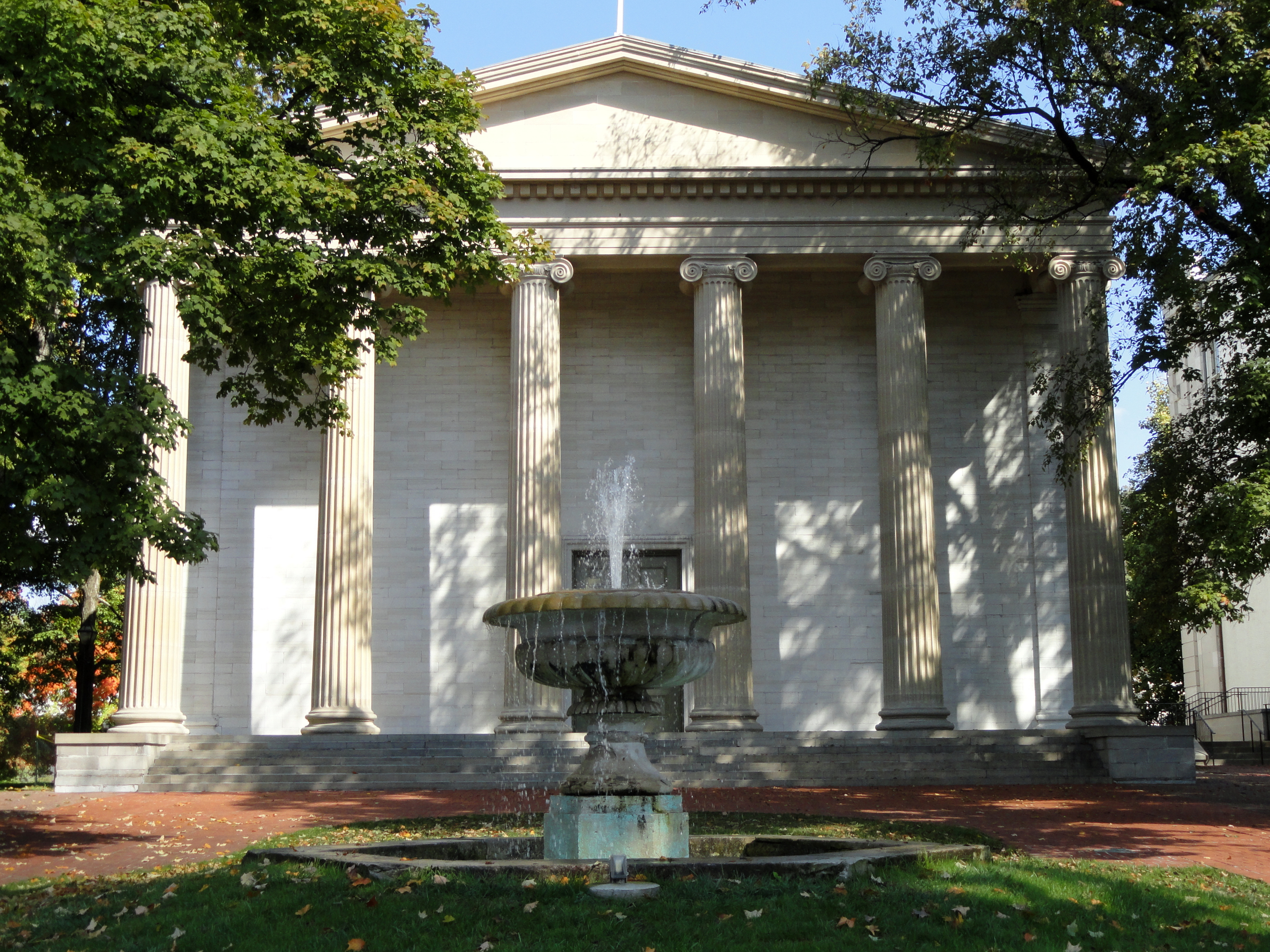
- The Old State Capitol of Kentucky in Frankfort

- Location within Kentucky Location within the United States
- Location: On Broadway, bounded by Madison, Clinton, and Lewis Sts., Frankfort, Kentucky
- Coordinates: 38°12′1.09″N 84°52′35.59″W
- Area: 3.5 acres (1.4 ha)
- Built: 1837
- Architect: Gideon Shryock
- Architectural style: Greek Revival
- Part of: Frankfort Commercial Historic District (ID79000986)
- NRHP reference No.: 71000346

Significant dates
- Added to NRHP: March 11, 1971
- Designated NHL: March 11, 1971
- Designated CP: May 10, 1979

The Old State Capitol in Kentucky, also known as Old Statehouse, is the former capitol building of the Commonwealth of Kentucky. The building is located in Kentucky's capital, Frankfort, and housed the Kentucky General Assembly from 1830 to 1910. The current Kentucky State Capitol was built in 1910. The Old State Capitol has served as a museum and the home of the Kentucky Historical Society since 1920. It has been restored to its American Civil War era appearance and was designated a U.S. National Historic Landmark in 1971 for its exceptional Greek Revival architecture, and is listed on the National Register of Historic Places.

The Kentucky legislature voted for its construction in 1827. The building was designed in the Greek Revival style by Gideon Shryock, an early Lexington, Kentucky architect. The Old State Capitol was his first building and he was only twenty-five years old. Shryock chose the Greek Revival style to symbolically link Kentucky, a young republic, with ancient Greece, the prototype of popular democratic government. He wanted the front of the building to duplicate the Temple of Minerva Polias at Priene. Greek temples had no windows, therefore the front of the capitol is devoid of fenestration. Other architectural features include a self-supporting stone stairway and a domed lantern above it to bring in sunlight.

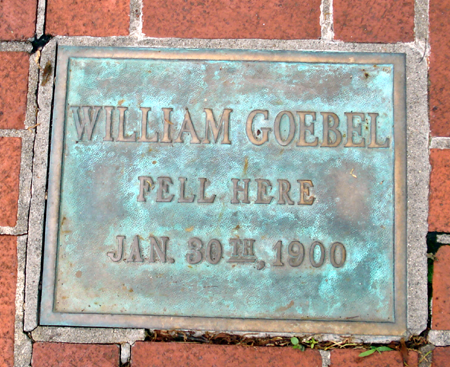
A plaque set in front of the building marks where Goebel fell after being shot.

A bitterly contested 1899 state governor election came to a climax when Democratic claimant William Goebel of Covington, Kentucky was assassinated at the capitol on his way to be inaugurated. A plaque reading "William Goebel fell here, Jan. 30th, 1900" exists near the front entrance of the building.

Martha Layne Collins, Kentucky's first female governor, lay in state, and also have her funeral held, at the building on November 9, 2025.

== See also ==
- List of National Historic Landmarks in Kentucky
- National Register of Historic Places listings in Franklin County, Kentucky
