= Adjutant General of Kentucky =

Head of the Kentucky National Guard in the US

Adjutant General of the Commonwealth of Kentucky
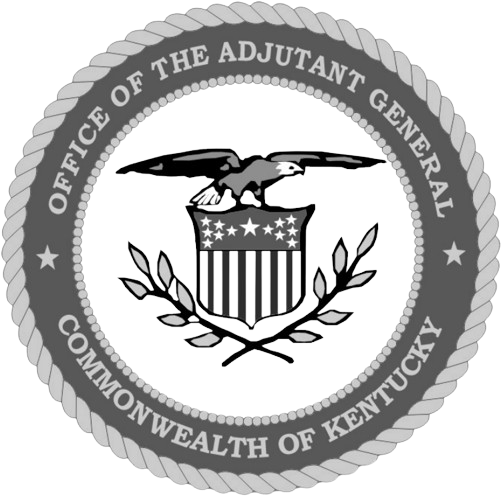
- Seal of the Office of the Adjutant General of the Commonwealth of Kentucky

- General officer flag

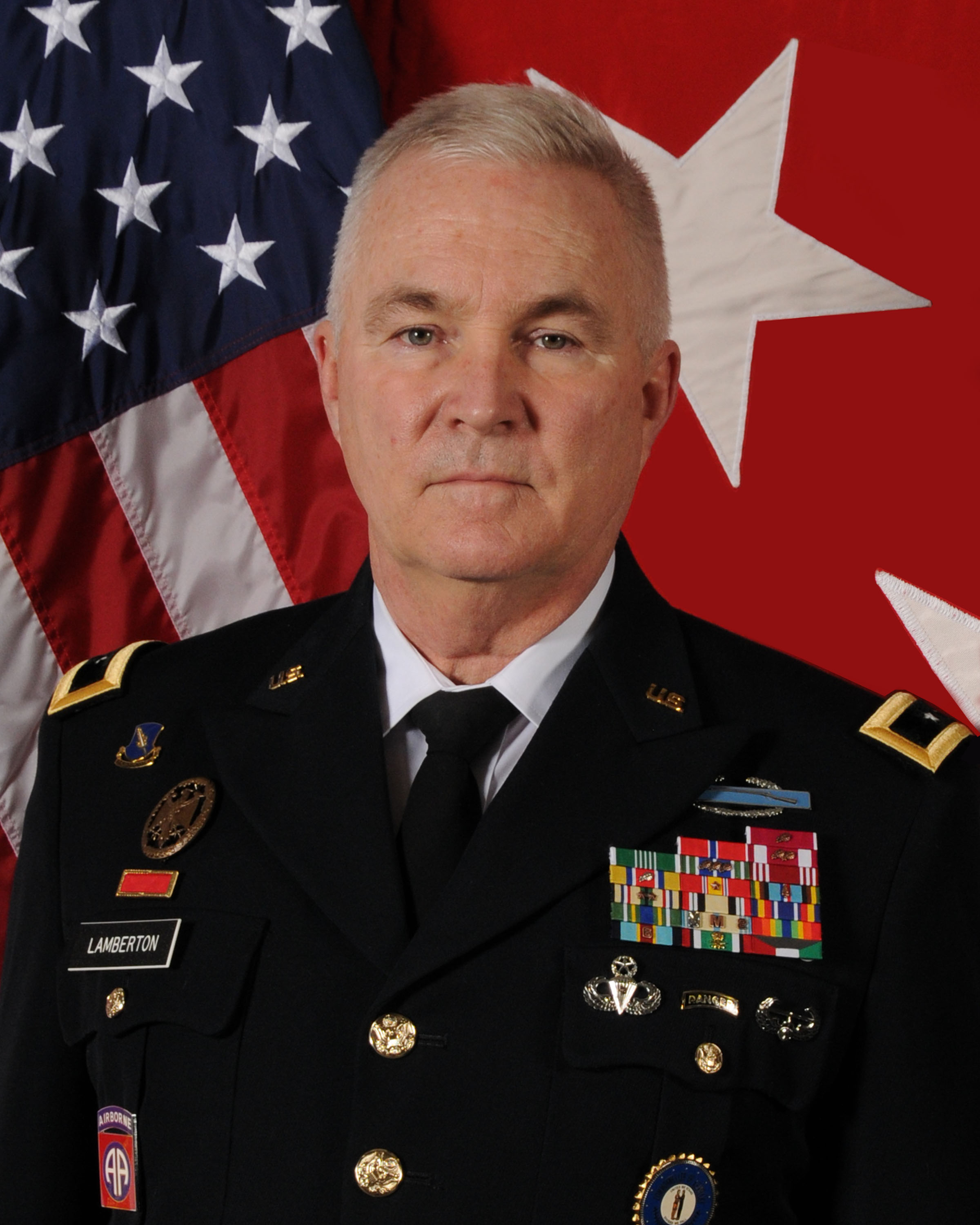
- Incumbent; Major General Haldane B. Lamberton since December 10, 2019
- Kentucky National Guard
- Seat: Frankfort, Kentucky
- Appointer: Governor of Kentucky
- Term length: Four years or end of appointing governor's tenure
- Formation: 1793
- First holder: Percival Pierce Butler

The Adjutant General of Kentucky is the senior-most officer and head of the Kentucky National Guard, second only to the governor acting as commander-in-chief as leader of Kentucky's armed forces.

The current adjutant general is Major General Haldane B. Lamberton, who was appointed by Governor Andy Beshear on December 10, 2019.

== History ==
=== Formation ===
The first constitution of Kentucky, ratified in April 1792, named the Governor of Kentucky as commander-in-chief of the army, navy, and militia of the commonwealth and granted them the authority to appoint field and staff officers.

While the exact date is unknown, Governor Isaac Shelby appointed Percival Pierce Butler as Kentucky's first adjutant general. The first official act taken by General Pierce is recorded to have been in March 1793.

=== Notable adjutants general and events ===
In 1851, Governor John L. Helm appointed future Supreme Court Justice John Marshall Harlan to the position at the age of 18 despite the fact that he had no prior experience serving in public office, and his only military experience was limited training for the Mexican–American War.

Samuel Ewing Hill, who served in the position from 1887 to 1891, is sometimes pointed to as the origin of the euphemism, "Sam Hill." General Hill was tasked by Governor Simon Bolivar Buckner to investigate the Hatfield-McCoy feud following a threat by West Virginia Governor Emanuel Willis Wilson to send the state militia across the Kentucky border to resolve the situation. From this, some newspapers began to question "what in the Sam Hill is going on," when reporting on the feud.

From February 3 to May 22, 1900, the office of adjutant general was contested as part of the wider disputes that resulted from the assignation of Governor William Goebel. General Daniel Collier –who was appointed by Governor William S. Taylor– and General John Breckinridge Castleman –appointed by Governor J. C. W. Beckham– each claimed the office. Following the decision of the United States Supreme Court in Taylor v. Beckham, Collier conceded the office to Castleman. Notably, both men had previously served as adjutant general in past administrations.

Beginning with the promotion of Adjutant General Roscoe L. Murray in 1950, all future adjutants general would automatically be commissioned as a major general.

== Appointment and qualifications ==
Kentucky Revised Statutes, Chapter 36.020 stipulates each governor must appoint an adjutant general immediately upon taking office. For the appointee to be eligible for the position they must have:

- Served at least 10 years in the Kentucky National Guard;
- Have attained the rank of lieutenant colonel;
- Have not been separated from the Kentucky National Guard for more than five years; and
- Meet the federal requirements for their current rank as well as the ranks of brigadier general and major general.

== List of adjutants general ==
| No. | Portrait | Name | Term of office | Governor(s) served |
|---|---|---|---|---|
| 1 | | Percival Pierce Butler | 1793 – 1817 | Isaac Shelby James Garrard Christopher Greenup Charles Scott Isaac Shelby George Madison Gabriel Slaughter |
| 2 | | Oliver G. Waggener | 1817 – 1828 | Gabriel Slaughter John Adair Joseph Desha |
| 3 | | Preston S. Loughborough | 1828 – 1829 | Joseph Desha |
| 4 | | Peter Dudley | 1829 – 1851 | Thomas Metcalf John Breathitt James T. Morehead James Clark Charles A. Wickliffe Robert P. Letcher William Owsley John J. Crittenden John L. Helm |
| 5 | | John Marshall Harlan | 1851 – 1859 | John L. Helm Lazarus W. Powell Charles S. Morehead |
| 6 | | Scott Brown | 1859 – 1861 | Beriah Magoffin |
| 7 | | John William Finnell | 1861 – 1863 | Beriah Magoffin James F. Robinson |
| 8 | | John Boyle | 1863 – 1864 | Thomas E. Bramlette |
| 9 | | Daniel Weisiger Lindsey | 1864 – 1867 | Thomas E. Bramlette |
| 10 | | Frank Lane Wolford | 1867 – 1870 | John W. Stevenson |
| 11 | | Josiah Stoddard Johnston | 1870 – 1871 | John W. Stevenson |
| 12 | | James Allen Dawson | 1871 – 1875 | Preston H. Leslie |
| 13 | | John Montgomery Wright | 1875 – 1879 | James B. McCreary |
| 14 | | Joseph Preyer Nuckols | 1879 – 1883 | Luke P. Blackburn |
| 15 | | John Breckenridge Castleman | 1883 – 1887 | J. Proctor Knott |
| 16 | | Samuel Ewing Hill | 1887 – 1891 | Simon Bolivar Buckner |
| 17 | | Andrew Jackson Gross | 1891 – 1893 | John Y. Brown |
| 18 | | John Crepps Wickliffe | 1893 – 1894 | John Y. Brown |
| 19 | | Andrew Jackson Gross | 1894 – 1895 | John Y. Brown |
| 20 | | Daniel Ray Collier | 1895 – 1898 | William O'Connell Bradley |
| 21 | | Wilbur Rush Smith | 1898 (Note: Smith served from September 9 to November 1, 1898.) | William O' Connell Bradley |
| 22 | | Daniel Ray Collier | 1898 – 1900 (Note: Collier reappointed on November 1, 1898, by Governor Bradley and on December 13,1899, by Governor Taylor. Office was disputed between Collier and Castleman from February 3 to May 22, 1900.) | William O' Connell Bradley Williams S. Taylor William Goebel J. C. W. Beckham |
| 23 | | John Breckenridge Castleman | 1900 (Note: Castleman formally assumed uncontested office on May 22, 1900, following decision Taylor v. Beckham. He remained in office until November 30.) | William Goebel J. C. W. Beckham |
| 24 | | David Rodman Murray Jr. | 1900 – 1903 | J. C. W. Beckham |
| 25 | | William Purcell "Percy" Dennis Haly | 1903 – 1906 | J. C. W. Beckham |
| 26 | | Henry Robert Lawrence | 1906 – 1907 | J. C. W. Beckham |
| 27 | | Philip Preston Johnston | 1907 – 1912 | Augustus E. Wilson |
| 28 | | William Birch Haldeman | 1912 – 1914 | James B. McCreary |
| 29 | | James Tandy Ellis | 1914 – 1919 | Augustus O. Stanley James D. Black |
| 30 | | James Madison DeWeese | 1919 – 1920 | Edwin P. Morrow |
| 31 | | Isaac Wilder | 1920 | Edwin P. Morrow |
| 32 | | Jackson Morris | 1920 – 1923 | Edwin P. Morrow |
| 33 | | Jouett Henry | 1923 – 1924 | William J. Fields |
| 34 | | James Arthur Kehoe | 1924 – 1927 | William J. Fields |
| 35 | | William Henry Jones Jr. | 1927 – 1932 | Flem D. Sampson Ruby Laffoon |
| 36 | | Henry H. Denhardt | 1932 – 1935 | Ruby Laffoon |
| 37 | | George Lee McLain | 1935 – 1939 | Albert "Happy" Chandler |
| 38 | | John Arthur Polin | 1939 – 1944 | Keen Johnson |
| 39 | | Gustavus Herbert May | 1944 – 1947 | Simeon Willis |
| 40 | | Roscoe Lee Murray | 1947 – 1951 | Earle C. Clements Lawrence W. Wetherby |
| 41 | | Jesse Scott Lindsey | 1951 – 1955 | Lawrence W. Wetherby |
| 42 | | John Jacob Bethurum Williams | 1955 – 1959 | Albert "Happy" Chandler |
| 43 | | Arthur Young Lloyd | 1959 – 1967 | Bert Combs Edward T. Breathitt |
| 44 | | Allan Kenneth Carrell | 1967 – 1968 | Louie Nunn |
| 45 | | Larry Clark Dawson | 1968 – 1971 | Louie Nunn |
| 46 | | Richard L. Frymire Jr. | 1971 – 1977 | Wendell Ford Julian Carroll |
| 47 | | Billy Gene Wellman | 1977 – 1987 | Julian Carroll John Y. Brown Jr. Martha Layne Collins |
| 48 | | Michael Walker Davidson | 1987 – 1991 | Wallace G. Wilkinson |
| 49 | | Tebbs Shewmaker Moore | 1991 | Wallace G. Wilkinson |
| 50 | | Robert Louis DeZarn | 1991 – 1995 | Brerton C. Jones |
| 51 | | John Russell Groves Jr. | 1995 – 2001 | Paul Patton |
| 52 | | Dean Allen Youngman | 2001 – 2003 | Paul Patton |
| 53 | | Donald C. Storm | 2003 – 2007 | Ernie Fletcher |
| 54 | | Edward W. Tonini | 2007 – 2015 | Steve Beshear |
| 55 | | Stephen R. Hogan | 2015 – 2019 | Matt Bevin |
| 56 | | Haldane B. Lamberton | 2019 – Present | Andy Beshear |
