= Cabell Breckinridge =

American politician

Cabell Breckiniridge

14th Secretary of State of Kentucky
- In office September 2, 1820 – September 1, 1823
- Governor: John Adair
- Preceded by: Oliver G. Waggener
- Succeeded by: Thomas Bell Monroe

12th Speaker of the Kentucky House of Representatives
- In office December 1, 1817 – December 5, 1819
- Preceded by: John J. Crittenden
- Succeeded by: Martin D. Hardin

Member of the Kentucky House of Representatives
- In office 1816–1819

Personal details
- Born: Joseph Cabell Breckinridge; July 14, 1788 Albemarle County, Virginia, U.S.
- Died: September 1, 1823 (aged 35) Frankfort, Kentucky, U.S.
- Party: Democratic-Republican
- Spouse: Mary Clay Smith
- Relations: John Breckinridge (father); Breckinridge family
- Children: 6, including John C. Breckinridge
- Education: College of New Jersey (now Princeton University)
- Profession: Lawyer

Military service
- Allegiance: United States
- Rank: Major
- Battles/wars: War of 1812

Joseph Cabell Breckinridge (July 14, 1788 – September 1, 1823) was an American lawyer, soldier, slaveholder and politician in Kentucky. From 1816 to 1819, he represented Fayette County in the Kentucky House of Representatives, and fellow members elected him as their speaker (1817 to 1819). In 1820, Governor John Adair appointed Breckinridge Kentucky Secretary of State, and he served until his death.

A member of the Breckinridge political family, he was the son of Virginia (then Kentucky) lawyer, Senator, and U.S. Attorney General John Breckinridge (1760–1806) and his wife Mary Hopkins Cabell Breckinridge (1769–1858), of another distinguished political family. Their son John C. Breckinridge would follow his father's (and grandfather's) path into law and politics and rise to become Vice President of the United States.

After graduating from Princeton University, Breckinridge intended to follow his late father's example by becoming a lawyer in Lexington, Kentucky, but first enlisted for service in the War of 1812. Soon after the war, he also began his political career by winning election to the Kentucky House of Representatives, where he led an unsuccessful attempt to oust Governor Gabriel Slaughter, who had ascended to the governorship upon George Madison's death. Breckinridge served as Speaker of the Kentucky House from 1817 to 1819. In 1820, he accepted Governor Adair's appointment as Secretary of State and moved to Frankfort, the state capital, to better attend to official duties, but fell ill with a fever in August 1823 and died on September 1, 1823.

== Early life and family ==
Joseph Cabell Breckinridge was born in Albemarle County, Virginia, on July 14, 1788. He was the second child and first son of John and Mary Hopkins "Polly" (née Cabell) Breckinridge. He was named for his maternal grandfather, Joseph Cabell, of Virginia's Cabell political family and known as "Cabell" throughout his life.

In 1793, his family moved to Lexington, Kentucky. Late in the year, a smallpox epidemic struck the city. Inoculations came too late, and although Breckinridge, his mother and his sister Letitia survived infection, his sister Mary and brother Robert died. Historian Lowell H. Harrison noted that otherwise "little is known of his boyhood", although presumably he received a private education suitable for his class and read from his father's extensive library.

In 1801, when Breckinridge was 12 years old, Kentucky legislators elected his father to represent the new state in the U.S. Senate. The family moved across the Appalachian Mountains to Bedford County, Virginia near Lynchburg, where they lived with relatives in order to be closer to the elder Breckinridge during the congressional session at Washington, D.C. While there, Cabell Breckinridge attended the New London Academy. A case of measles prevented him from attending the College of William & Mary, his father's alma mater, where his cousin, future Congressman James Breckinridge, was enrolled. In 1803, Cabell Breckinridge accompanied his father to the national capital, where he witnessed the debates over the Louisiana Purchase before returning to his studies. After Congress adjourned in March, John Breckinridge retrieved his son from school, and they arrived back at Cabell's Dale, the family estate near Lexington, on April 18, 1804.

Breckinridge did not travel eastward with his father in late 1804, but instead studied for about a year under Colonel Samuel Wilson before enrolling at the College of New Jersey (now Princeton University).

=== Princeton University ===
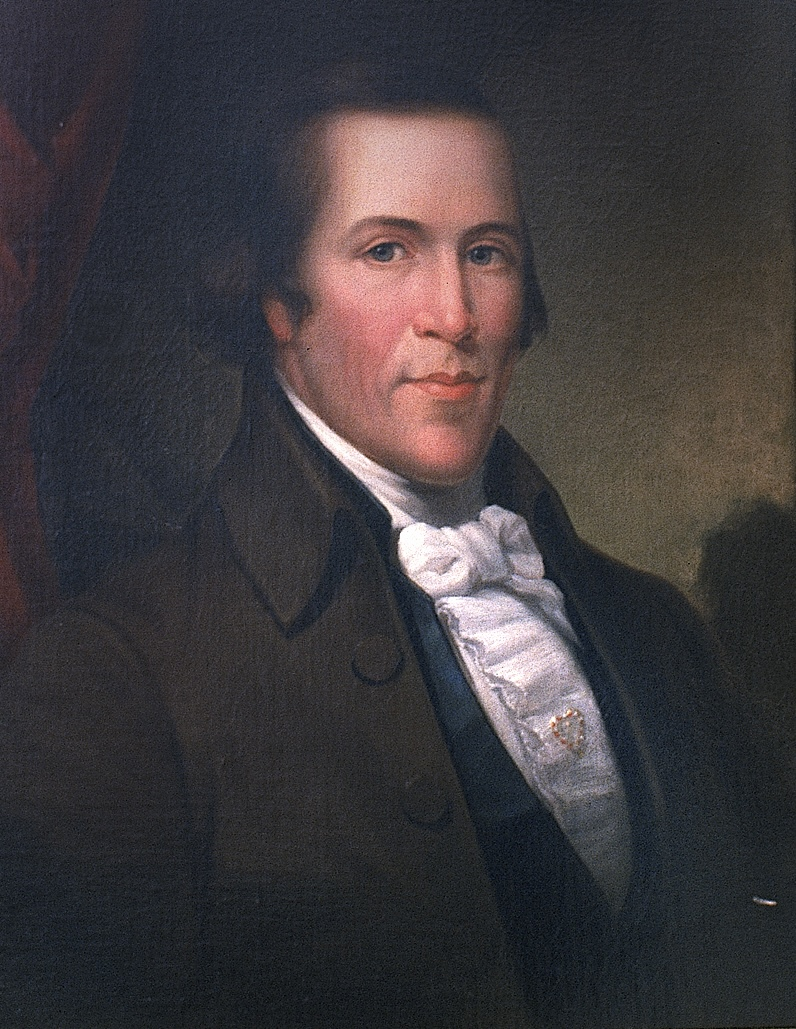
Breckinridge's father, John, died in 1806 while he was away at college.

Breckinridge arrived in Princeton, New Jersey, in late December 1805. Despite completing his final exams by April 5, he declined his father's offer to come to Washington because he needed to catch up on his studies in arithmetic. When the next term began in May, Breckinridge joined the American Whig–Cliosophic Society, a debating society founded by James Madison, Philip Freneau, Aaron Burr, and Henry Lee in 1769.

In mid-1806, Cabell learned that his father was sick back in Kentucky. Not long after, however, he received word that his father was improving and expected to meet him in Virginia en route to the capital. Although the specific rendezvous location was unspecified, he assumed it would near Lynchburg. In October, Breckinridge traveled to his uncle Lewis Breckinridge's home to wait for his father, who never arrived. After returning to Princeton as the new term began, Breckinridge learned that his father had attempted to leave Cabell's Dale on October 22 but collapsed off his horse and returned to his sick bed; he died December 14, 1806.

In January 1807, travelers from Kentucky finally brought Cabell Breckinridge word of his father's death. Despite Cabell's declaration to a relative that, "I consider my life dedicated to my mother's ease", he did not return immediately to Kentucky. John Breckinridge died intestate, complicating the settlement of his estate and creating financial difficulties for Cabell, who had been receiving support from his father. Desperate, he appealed to Alfred Grayson, his sister Letitia's husband and son of former Virginia Senator William Grayson, for assistance.

However, that March, Cabell joined about 125 other students protesting against the Presbyterian institution's strict rules and rigorous curriculum. College administrators subsequently suspended everyone who refused to withdraw his name from the formal protest petition. Breckinridge refused to apologize for his role in the protest. Instead, in May, he left Princeton for Cabell's Dale, but in Philadelphia found no available stages heading for Kentucky for two weeks. Unable to afford room and board for that long, he instead traveled south toward Lynchburg, then stayed with relatives in Fincastle. Breckinridge considered enrolling at the College of William and Mary for the fall term in 1807, believing he could complete his studies in nine months, but ultimately decided against it. He may have also managed to return to Cabell's Dale between July 1807 to July 1808, based on the absence of family correspondence.

By July 1808, Breckinridge decided to return to Princeton in October to finish his studies. His roommate, James G. Birney, and the university president, Rev. Samuel Stanhope Smith (who had also served as a missionary in Virginia and had been the founding president of Hampden-Sydney College), were both ardent abolitionists. However, many of Cabell Beckinridge's relatives owned slaves. Nonetheless, he became convinced that slavery must end, but only by voluntary emancipation, not by government interference. He received his bachelor's degree in 1810. About a year later, as discussed below, he married Rev. Smith's daughter.

=== Marriage ===
While completing his degree, Breckinridge began courting Mary Clay Smith, the university president's daughter and granddaughter of John Witherspoon, a signer of the Declaration of Independence and Princeton's sixth president. After graduation, Breckinridge had journeyed home to Kentucky, but returned to Princeton. He married Mary Smith on May 11, 1811. The couple had five children – Frances (born 1812), Caroline (born 1813), Mary Cabell (born 1815), John Cabell (born 1821), and Laetitia (born 1822). Their only son followed Breckinridge family tradition and became a lawyer as well as represented Kentucky in both houses of Congress, and eventually was elected Vice President of the United States in 1856, as well as became the fifth and final Confederate States Secretary of War.

== Soldier, planter and lawyer ==
After visiting friends and relatives in Princeton, Philadelphia, and New York City, the newly wed couple moved in with Breckinridge's widowed mother at Cabell's Dale. Before Breckinridge could begin his legal career, the U.S. entered the War of 1812. Commissioned a major, Breckinridge served as aide-de-camp under Congressman Samuel Hopkins during the War of 1812. He would later refer to the war as "a foolish and ineffectual brace of campaigns on the Illinois and Wabash".

After the war, Breckinridge was admitted to the Kentucky bar in 1814, and began his legal career in Lexington. He also taught religion, helped found the Second Presbyterian Church in Lexington and became one of its ruling elders. In 1815, Breckinridge purchased Thorn Hill, an estate on north Limestone and 5th streets in Lexington. By 1820, Cabell Breckinridge owned eight slaves.

== Political career ==
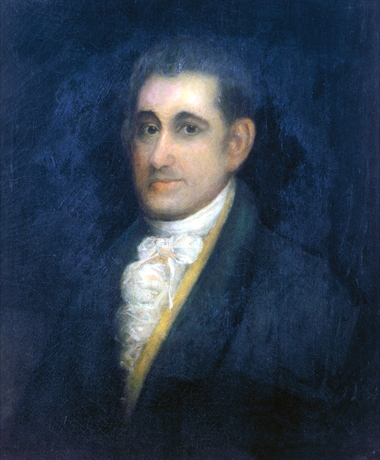
John Adair appointed Breckinridge Secretary of State in 1820.

In 1816, Breckinridge won election as a Democratic-Republican to represent Fayette Countyin the Kentucky House of Representatives, gaining the largest majority given to a candidate for office in that county to that point. His legislative career began during the national "Era of Good Feelings", largely congruent with the presidency of James Monroe, when political disagreements were relatively few. Nevertheless, dissension erupted in Kentucky in October 1816 after the death of Governor George Madison just three weeks into his term. Lieutenant Governor Gabriel Slaughter, as acting governor, rescinded Madison's appointment of Charles Stewart Todd as Secretary of State, replacing him with former Senator John Pope, who was unpopular because of his vote against declaring the War of 1812. Slaughter followed this up by appointing Martin D. Hardin, widely regarded as a Federalist despite his nominal identification with the Democratic-Republicans, to fill the Senate vacancy caused by the resignation of William T. Barry.

Both appointments were unpopular in the state, and on January 27, 1817, Breckinridge formed a coalition of legislators in the House that sponsored a bill to elect "a governor to fill the vacancy occasioned by the death of" Madison, essentially an attempt to oust Slaughter from the governorship. The bill passed the House by a vote of 56–30, but the Senate refused to concur. Madison's death was the first time the lieutenant governor succeeded permanently to the governorship, establishing the precedent for future instances. Nevertheless, several anti-Slaughter candidates were elected in the 1817 legislative elections. Breckinridge was re-elected in both 1817 and 1818 and was chosen Speaker of the House both years.

In 1820, Breckinridge's friend, newly elected Governor John Adair, appointed him as Kentucky Secretary of State. Of this appointment, historian William C. Davis wrote, "It was a prestigious, albeit not too influential, position and would require his full-time presence at the capital." He remained in Lexington until the birth of his son in January 1821; in February, the family moved to the Governor's Mansion in Frankfort to live with Adair. Although his mother opposed the move to Frankfort, he intended for it to be permanent; an acquaintance wrote that "his plans were extensive and his hopes high" for his family's life in the state capital. In addition to his duties as secretary of state, he continued to practice law.

== Death ==
Throughout his term, Breckinridge's health became increasingly fragile. When an illness described in contemporary accounts as "the prevailing fever" struck Lexington in 1823, he took the children to Cabell's Dale to prevent them from becoming ill. When he returned in late August, he contracted the fever. Despite the care of his brother, John, and the local doctors, he died on September 1, 1823, just over a week after falling ill. Originally buried on the grounds at Cabell's Dale, he and several family members were re-interred at Lexington Cemetery near the grave of his brother Robert Jefferson Breckinridge.

Breckinridge left behind $15,000 in debts, and with the nation still in the throes of the Panic of 1819, his assets were not enough to pay off the obligations. His wife, who also fell ill and was pregnant with the couple's sixth child, was so depressed because of his death and her subsequent financial straits that she suffered a miscarriage. She and the children moved in with Cabell's widowed mother at Cabell's Dale. For several years, she was dependent upon her in-laws for survival; Breckinridge's brother, Robert, assumed Cabell's debts, which he paid in full in 1832.

== See also ==
Political offices
Preceded by Oliver G. Waggener	Secretary of State of Kentucky; 1820—1823	Succeeded by Thomas B. Monroe
