= Oliver G. Waggener =

American politician

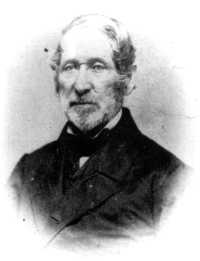

13th Secretary of State of Kentucky
- In office August 2, 1819 – September 1, 1820
- Preceded by: John Pope
- Succeeded by: Cabell Breckinridge

2nd Adjutant General of Kentucky
- In office September 19, 1817 – January 29, 1828
- Preceded by: Percival Pierce Butler
- Succeeded by: Preston S. Loughborough

Oliver G. Waggener was an American politician who served as the 13th Secretary of State of Kentucky as well as the 2nd Adjutant General of Kentucky.
