= 1918 United States Senate election in Kentucky =

- November 5, 1918
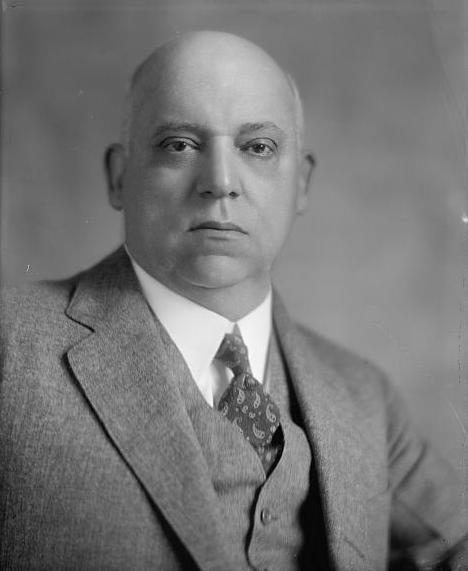

Nominee	Augustus O. Stanley (replacing Ollie M. James)	Ben Bruner
Party	Democratic	Republican
Popular vote	184,385	178,797
Percentage	50.77%	49.23%
- County results Stanley: 50–60% 60–70% 70–80% 80–90% Bruner: 50–60% 60–70% 70–80% 80–90% >90%
U.S. senator before election
George Brown Martin
Democratic
Elected U.S. Senator
Augustus Owsley Stanley
Democratic

The 1918 United States Senate election in Kentucky took place on November 7, 1918. Incumbent Senator Ollie M. James sought a second term in office but died on August 18. He was replaced on the Democratic ticket by Governor Augustus Owsley Stanley, who defeated Republican Ben Bruner.

== General election ==
=== Candidates ===
- Ben Bruner, doctor (Republican)
- Augustus Owsley Stanley, Governor of Kentucky (Democratic)

=== Campaign ===
After Senator James died, Governor Stanley appointed George B. Martin to complete his unexpired term, set to end on March 3. Stanley was then nominated by the Democratic State Committee for the full term in office. He enjoyed the unified support of the Democratic Party, including Senator J. C. W. Beckham, who worried Stanley would challenge him for his own seat again in 1920 as he had in 1914, and President Woodrow Wilson. Bruner, a relative unknown, ran a campaign opposed to the prohibition of alcohol and in favor of a bill banning the German language, which Stanley had vetoed as Governor.

=== Results ===
1918 U.S. Senate election in Kentucky
Party	Candidate	Votes	%
Democratic	Augustus Owsley Stanley	184,385	50.77%
Republican	Frederic M. Sackett	178,797	49.23%
Total votes		363,182	100.00%
Democratic hold			

== See also ==
- 1918 United States Senate elections
