= 1915 Kentucky gubernatorial election =

- November 2, 1915
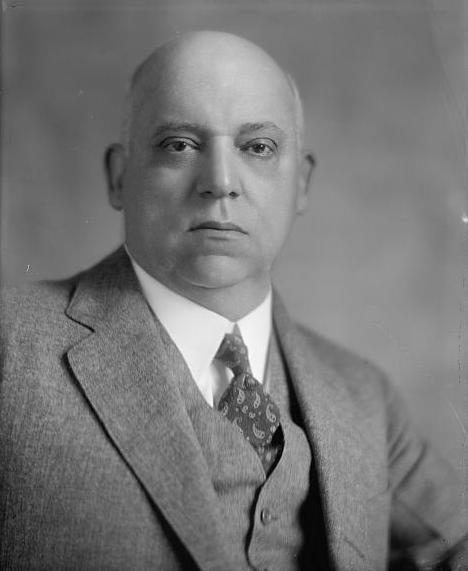

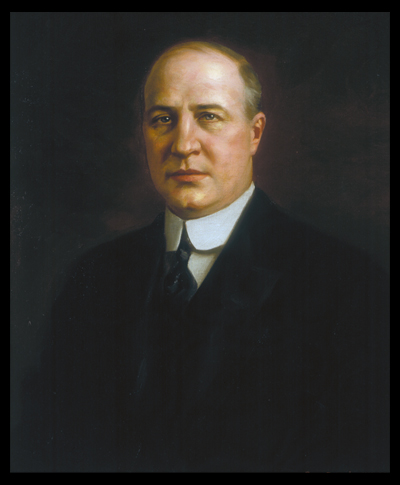
Nominee	Augustus Owsley Stanley	Edwin P. Morrow
Party	Democratic	Republican
Popular vote	219,991	219,520
Percentage	49.06%	48.96%
- Stanley: 40–50% 50–60% 60–70% 70–80% 80–90% Morrow: 40–50% 50–60% 60–70% 70–80% 80–90% >90%
Governor before election
James B. McCreary
Democratic
Elected Governor
Augustus Owsley Stanley
Democratic

The 1915 Kentucky gubernatorial election was held on November 2, 1915. Democratic nominee Augustus Owsley Stanley narrowly defeated Republican nominee Edwin P. Morrow by 471 votes.

== General election ==
=== Candidates ===
Major party candidates

- Augustus Owsley Stanley, Democratic
- Edwin P. Morrow, Republican

Other candidates

- L. L. Pickett, Prohibition
- Charles Dobbs, Socialist
- Fred J. Drexler, Progressive

=== Results ===
1915 Kentucky gubernatorial election
Party	Candidate	Votes	%	±%
Democratic	Augustus Owsley Stanley	219,991	49.06%	−2.95%
Republican	Edwin P. Morrow	219,520	48.96%	+4.04%
Prohibition	L. L. Pickett	4,201	0.94%	+0.10%
Socialist	Charles Dobbs	3,307	0.74%	−1.26%
Progressive	Fred J. Drexler	1,371	0.31%	N/A
Majority		471	0.10%	
Turnout				
Democratic hold		Swing		
