= 1919 Kentucky gubernatorial election =

- November 4, 1919
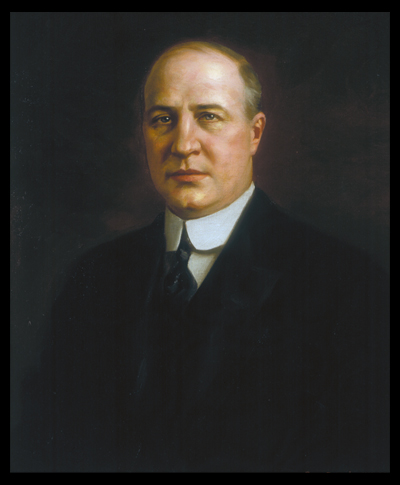

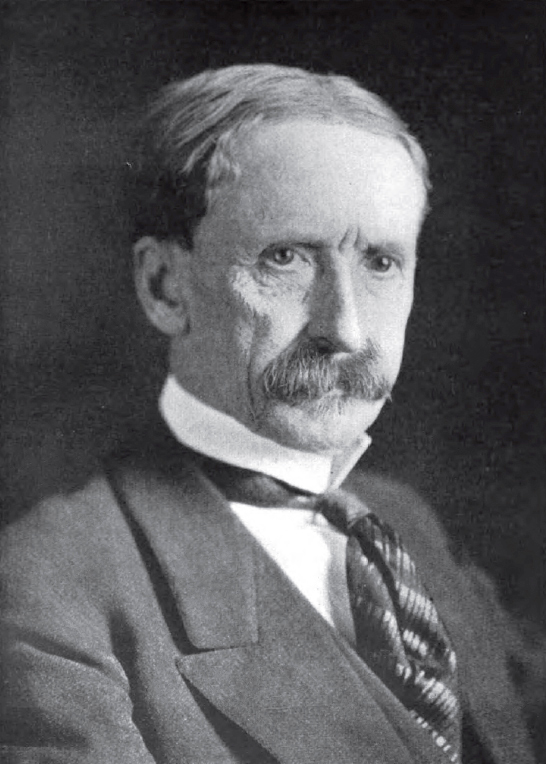
Nominee	Edwin P. Morrow	James D. Black
Party	Republican	Democratic
Popular vote	254,472	214,134
Percentage	53.82%	45.29%
- Morrow: 40–50% 50–60% 60–70% 70–80% 80–90% >90% Black: 40–50% 50–60% 60–70% 70–80% 80–90%
Governor before election
James D. Black
Democratic
Elected Governor
Edwin P. Morrow
Republican

The 1919 Kentucky gubernatorial election was held on November 4, 1919. Republican nominee Edwin P. Morrow defeated Democratic incumbent James D. Black with 53.82% of the vote.

== General election ==
=== Candidates ===
Major party candidates

- Edwin P. Morrow, Republican
- James D. Black, Democratic

Other candidates

- G. D. Becker, Socialist

=== Results ===
1919 Kentucky gubernatorial election
Party	Candidate	Votes	%	±%
Republican	Edwin P. Morrow	254,472	53.82%	+4.86%
Democratic	James D. Black (incumbent)	214,134	45.29%	−3.77%
Socialist	G. D. Becker	4,221	0.89%	+0.15%
Majority		40,338	8.53%	
Turnout				
Republican gain from Democratic		Swing		
