= George B. Martin =

American politician

George Brown Martin
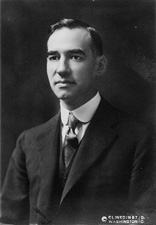

United States Senator from Kentucky
- In office September 7, 1918 – March 4, 1919
- Appointed by: Augustus O. Stanley
- Preceded by: Ollie M. James
- Succeeded by: Augustus O. Stanley

Personal details
- Born: August 18, 1876 Prestonsburg, Kentucky, U.S.
- Died: November 12, 1945 (aged 69) Catlettsburg, Kentucky, U.S.
- Party: Democratic

George Brown Martin (August 18, 1876 – November 12, 1945) was an American lawyer, judge, and politician who served as a United States senator from Kentucky as a member of the Democratic Party.

== Early life and education ==
Martin was born in Prestonsburg, Kentucky, and moved with his parents to Catlettsburg, Kentucky, in 1877. He attended public schools and graduated from Centre University in 1895. He studied law, was admitted to the bar in 1900, and began practicing in Catlettsburg.

== Career ==
Before entering politics, Martin was general counsel and director of the Big Sandy & Kentucky River Railway Company and vice president of the Ohio Valley Electric Railway Company. He also served as director of the Kentucky-Farmers Bank of Catlettsburg.

In 1904, Martin was elected county judge of Boyd County, Kentucky. He later became a member of the Council of National Defense for Kentucky in 1917. He was appointed a major in the United States Army Judge Advocate General's Corps, but did not serve due to his subsequent appointment to the Senate.

On September 7, 1918, Martin was appointed to the United States Senate by Governor Augustus Owsley Stanley to fill the vacancy caused by the death of Ollie M. James. He served until March 3, 1919, and did not seek election to a full term. While in the Senate, he was chairman of the U.S. Senate Committee on Expenditures in the Department of Agriculture.

== Later life and death ==
After leaving the Senate, Martin resumed the practice of law in Catlettsburg. He died there on November 12, 1945, and was interred in Catlettsburg Cemetery.

U.S. Senate
Preceded by Ollie M. James	United States Senator (Class 2) from Kentucky; 1918 - 1919	Succeeded by Augustus O. Stanley
