= Henry Denhardt =

American politician

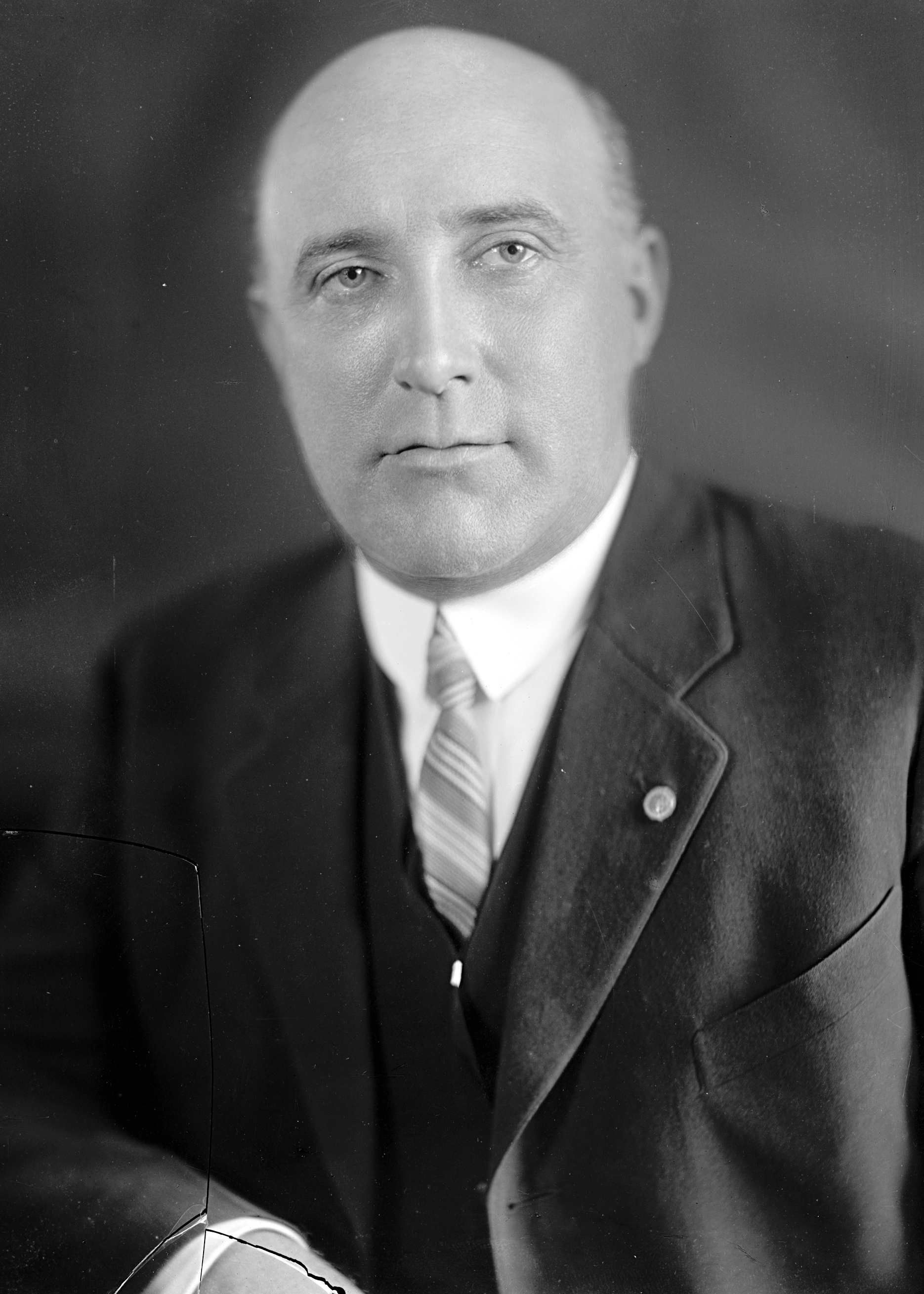

34th Lieutenant Governor of Kentucky
- In office December 11, 1923 – December 13, 1927
- Governor: William J. Fields
- Preceded by: S. Thruston Ballard
- Succeeded by: James Breathitt Jr.

36th Adjutant General of Kentucky
- In office March 14, 1932 – December 10, 1935
- Governor: Ruby Laffoon
- Preceded by: William Henry Jones Jr.
- Succeeded by: George Lee McLain

Personal details
- Born: March 8, 1876 Bowling Green, Kentucky, U.S.
- Died: September 20, 1937 (aged 61) Shelbyville, Kentucky, U.S.
- Party: Democratic
- Education: Cumberland University

Military service
- Allegiance: United States
- Branch/service: Kentucky National Guard
- Years of service: 1898-1935
- Rank: Brigadier General
- Battles/wars: Spanish–American War; Border War; Pancho Villa Expedition; World War I; Meuse-Argonne Offensive

Henry Herman Denhardt (March 8, 1876 – September 20, 1937) was an American politician and military officer, who served as the 34th lieutenant governor of Kentucky from 1923 to 1927, under Governor William J. Fields. He later served as the 36th Adjutant General of Kentucky from 1932 to 1935 under Governor Ruby Laffoon.

Denhardt was born in Bowling Green, Kentucky in 1876. In November 1936, he was charged with the murder of his girlfriend, Verna Garr Taylor, and tried in New Castle, Kentucky. The trial ended with a hung jury. Before Denhardt could be retried, he was shot and killed by Taylor's three brothers at the Armstrong Hotel in Shelbyville, Kentucky on September 20, 1937. The brothers were later acquitted of killing Denhardt.

Denhardt is also a suspect in the possible murder of Patricia Wilson on July 15, 1936. Her body was found in the elevator shaft of the Seelbach Hotel, having fallen over six floors. A coroner concluded that Wilson had caused her own death through recklessness. However, Denhardt was seen at the hotel that night, arguing on the eighth floor with a young woman. He was reportedly the last man seen by Wilson. Wilson's executor, Edward Langan, brought a lawsuit against Denhardt in July 1937 for killing Wilson, a case that was still ongoing when Denhardt was killed.

== See also ==
- 1921-1928 Newport, Kentucky steel strike

== Sources ==
- The Political Graveyard
- Louisville Courier Journal

Political offices
Preceded by S. Thruston Ballard	Lieutenant Governor of Kentucky; 1923–1927	Succeeded by James Breathitt Jr.
Preceded by William Henry Jones Jr.	Adjutant General of Kentucky; 1932–1935	Succeeded by George Lee McLain
