= S. Thruston Ballard =

American politician

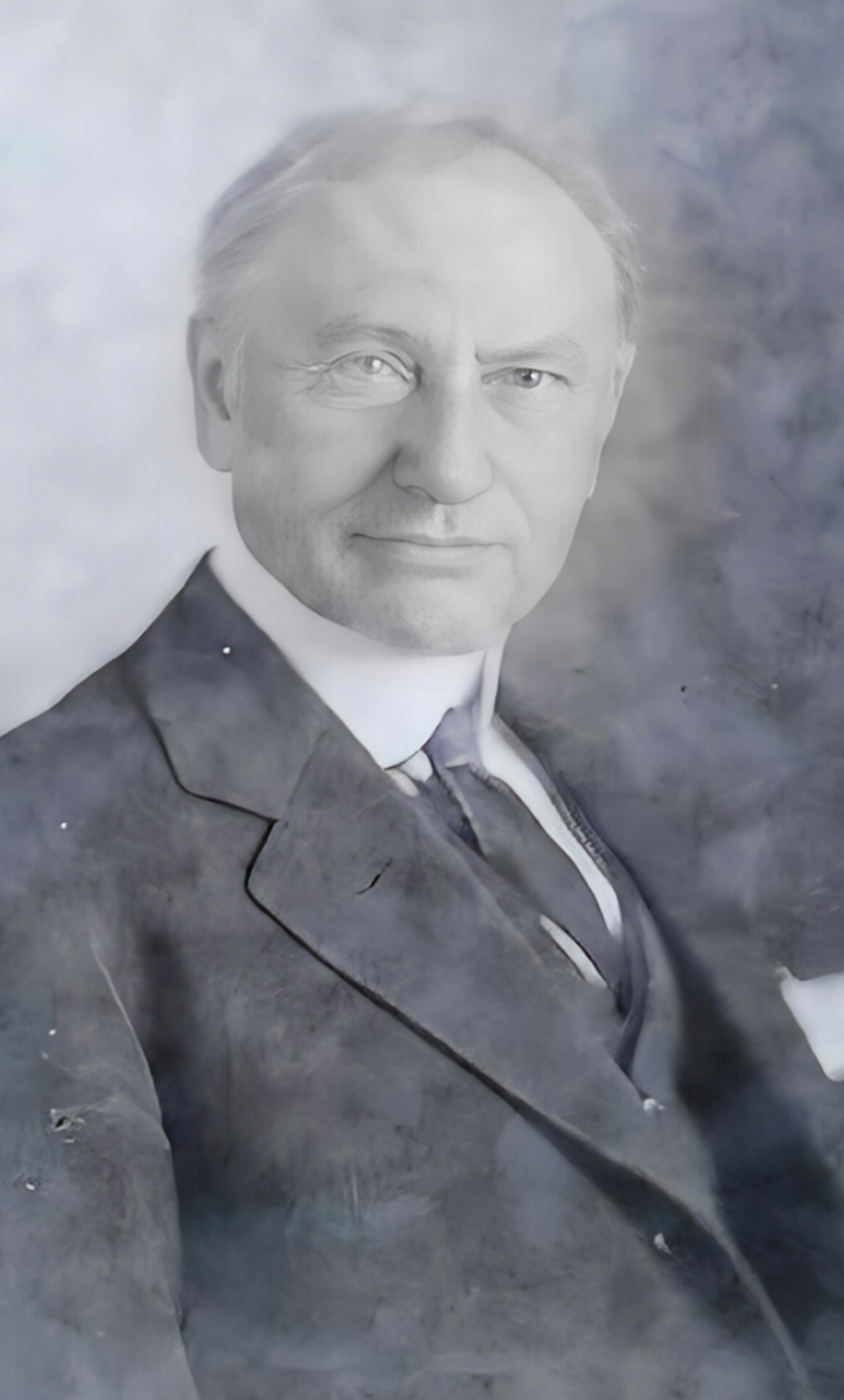

33rd Lieutenant Governor of Kentucky
- In office December 9, 1919 – December 11, 1923
- Governor: Edwin P. Morrow
- Preceded by: James D. Black
- Succeeded by: Henry Denhardt

Personal details
- Born: February 11, 1855; Louisville, Kentucky, U.S.
- Died: January 18, 1926 (aged 70); Glenview, Kentucky, U.S.
- Resting place: Cave Hill Cemetery; Louisville, Kentucky
- Political party: Republican
- Relations: Zudie Harris Reinecke (sister-in-law); Thruston Ballard Morton (grandson); Rogers Morton (grandson)

Samuel Thruston Ballard (February 11, 1855 – January 18, 1926) was an American politician, businessman, and philanthropist who served as the 33rd lieutenant governor of Kentucky from 1919 to 1923, under Governor Edwin P. Morrow.

== Early life and education ==
Samuel Thruston Ballard was born in Louisville, Kentucky to Andrew Jackson and Fannie (Thruston) Ballard. His father was a whig member of the Kentucky House of Representatives, representing Louisville from 1842 to 1843, as well as city attorney of Louisville and clerk of the United States District Court for the District of Kentucky.

Ballard was educated in public schools of Louisville and worked to expand his education at Huntoon's private academy. He went on to attend Cornell University where he was a member of Alpha Delta Phi and graduated in 1878.

For the next four years Ballard would work for Chess, Carley & Company. In 1880, with his brother R. C. Ballard Thruston, Ballard was president of the Ballard & Ballard Flour Company. The first mill was built in the back yard of the Ballard estate on Walnut Street.

On January 25, Ballard was married to Sunshine Harris (1861–1938), the daughter of Theodore Harris of Louisville Kentucky.

== Career ==
In 1884, he faced a debt crisis due to hard times in the land. In 1889, Ballard & Ballard Co. was one of the first employers to introduce the profit sharing plan.

Ballard attended the 1904 World's Fair in St. Louis, Missouri. While there, Ballard purchased and arranged the donation of the Egyptian mummy Tchaenhotep to the Louisville Free Public Library Museum.

In 1913, President Woodrow Wilson appointed Ballard to be member of the Commission on Industrial Relations.

Samuel and Sunshine had four children together. However, only their daughter, Mary, would survive to adulthood. Among Samuel's grandchildren are Thruston Ballard Morton and Rogers Morton.

== Death ==
In 1925, Ballard became ill at his winter home at Eau Gallie, Florida. On January 18, 1926, after being bedridden for weeks, Samuel died in his home at Glenview at the age of 71. The disease that took his life was cancerous in nature. He is buried at Cave Hill Cemetery.

Political offices
Preceded by James D. Black	Lieutenant Governor of Kentucky; 1919–1923	Succeeded by Henry Denhardt
