= Tchaenhotep =

Egyptian mummy

Tchaenhotep (a.k.a. ThenHotep) pronounced Cha-en-hotep, is a female Third Intermediate Period mummy. Currently, Tchaenhotep is on display at the Kentucky Science Center in Louisville, Kentucky, United States.

== Name and life ==
The meaning of her name is "the one who is content". Tchaenhotep lived somewhere between c. 1069 BC and c. 664 BC. Tchaenhotep died at an early age between 25 and 35 years old. She was one of eight in her family to be buried in the famous Valley of the Queens. At the time of her death the valley was no longer used for royal burials. She was buried along with forty-two other mummies.

== Tomb and coffin ==
Tchaenhotep's tomb was located by Italian Egyptologist Ernesto Schiaparelli in 1903. A dig that was commissioned by the Egyptian government. Schiaparelli was noted to have also discovered Queen Nefertari’s tomb in the Valley of the Queens. The catalogue number 2-2-1 is painted on the bottom of Tchaenhotep’s coffin. The purpose was to help identify the burial site in which she was discovered. With only partial hieroglyphs available the mummy was named "Then-Hotep". At this time, the sex of the mummy could not be determined. Professor Gaston Maspero, a well-known and admired Egyptologist, hand-picked Tchaenhotep to be sent to the 1904 St. Louis World's Fair.

== Move to the United States ==
Tchaenhotep was brought to the U.S. for the 1904 World's Fair in St. Louis Egyptian exhibit. She was purchased after the exhibit by the Lieutenant Governor of Kentucky, Samuel Thruston Ballard to be put on display at the Louisville Free Public Library Museum.

The Ohio River flood of 1937 damaged many museum exhibits including the mummy, which was crushed under a piano. She was eventually restored to the viewing public.

In 1977, the mummy was relocated to what is now Kentucky Science Center for display.

In 2000, the mummy was placed in the museum's collections storage area until 2005. During that time, it was analyzed by the Louisville Baptist Hospital East, where it was discovered that the heart and brain had not been removed. The resulting studies were made public for the museums exhibition release entitled the "World Around Us".
