= Edward J. McDermott =

American politician

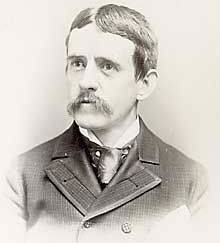

31st Lieutenant Governor of Kentucky
- In office December 12, 1911 – December 7, 1915
- Governor: James B. McCreary
- Preceded by: William Hopkinson Cox
- Succeeded by: James D. Black

Personal details
- Born: October 29, 1852 Louisville, Kentucky, U.S.
- Died: May 1, 1926 (aged 73)
- Party: Democratic
- Education: Harvard University
- Profession: Lawyer

Edward John McDermott (October 29, 1852 – May 1, 1926) was an American politician, who served as the 31st lieutenant governor of Kentucky from 1911 to 1915, under Governor James B. McCreary. At the time, this was the highest political post ever achieved by a Catholic in Kentucky.

== Bibliography ==
- Clift, G. Glenn (1942). Governors of Kentucky, 1792-1942. Cynthiana, Ky.: Hobson Press.
- "Obituary". Courier-Journal. May 2, 1926.

Political offices
Preceded by William Hopkinson Cox	Lieutenant Governor of Kentucky; 1911–1915	Succeeded by James D. Black
