= Richard Frymire =

American politician (born 1931)

Richard L. Frymire Jr.
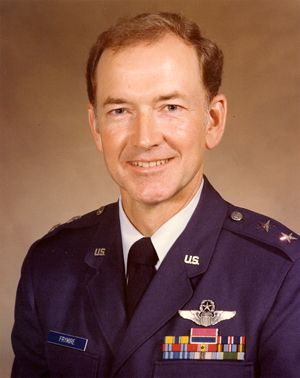

Judge/Executive of Hopkins County
- In office January 4, 1999 – January 6, 2003
- Preceded by: Danny H. Woodward
- Succeeded by: Patricia Hawkins

46th Adjutant General of Kentucky
- In office December 7, 1971 – December 8, 1977
- Governor: Wendell Ford; Julian Carroll
- Preceded by: Larry Clark Dawson
- Succeeded by: Billy Gene Wellman

Majority Leader of the Kentucky Senate
- In office January 1968 – January 1970
- Preceded by: J.D. Buckman
- Succeeded by: Walter Dee Huddleston

Member of the Kentucky Senate from the 6th district
- In office January 1, 1966 – January 1, 1970
- Preceded by: Frederick E. Nichols
- Succeeded by: William A. Logan

Member of the Kentucky House of Representatives from the 10th district
- In office January 1, 1962 – January 1, 1966
- Preceded by: Frederick E. Nichols
- Succeeded by: John Henry Cox

Personal details
- Born: April 1, 1931 (age 95) Louisville, Kentucky, U.S.
- Party: Democratic

Richard L. Frymire Jr. (born January 4, 1931) is an American former politician in the state of Kentucky.

He served as a member of the Kentucky House of Representatives from 1962 to 1966, and the Kentucky Senate from 1966 to 1970. From 1968 to the end of his tenure, he served Senate Majority Leader. He was appointed and served as Adjutant General of Kentucky from 1971 to 1977. He also was elected and served as judge/executive of Hopkins County, Kentucky, from 1999 to 2003.

Frymire retired from the Kentucky Air National Guard at the rank of major general.
