= James Breathitt Jr. =

American politician

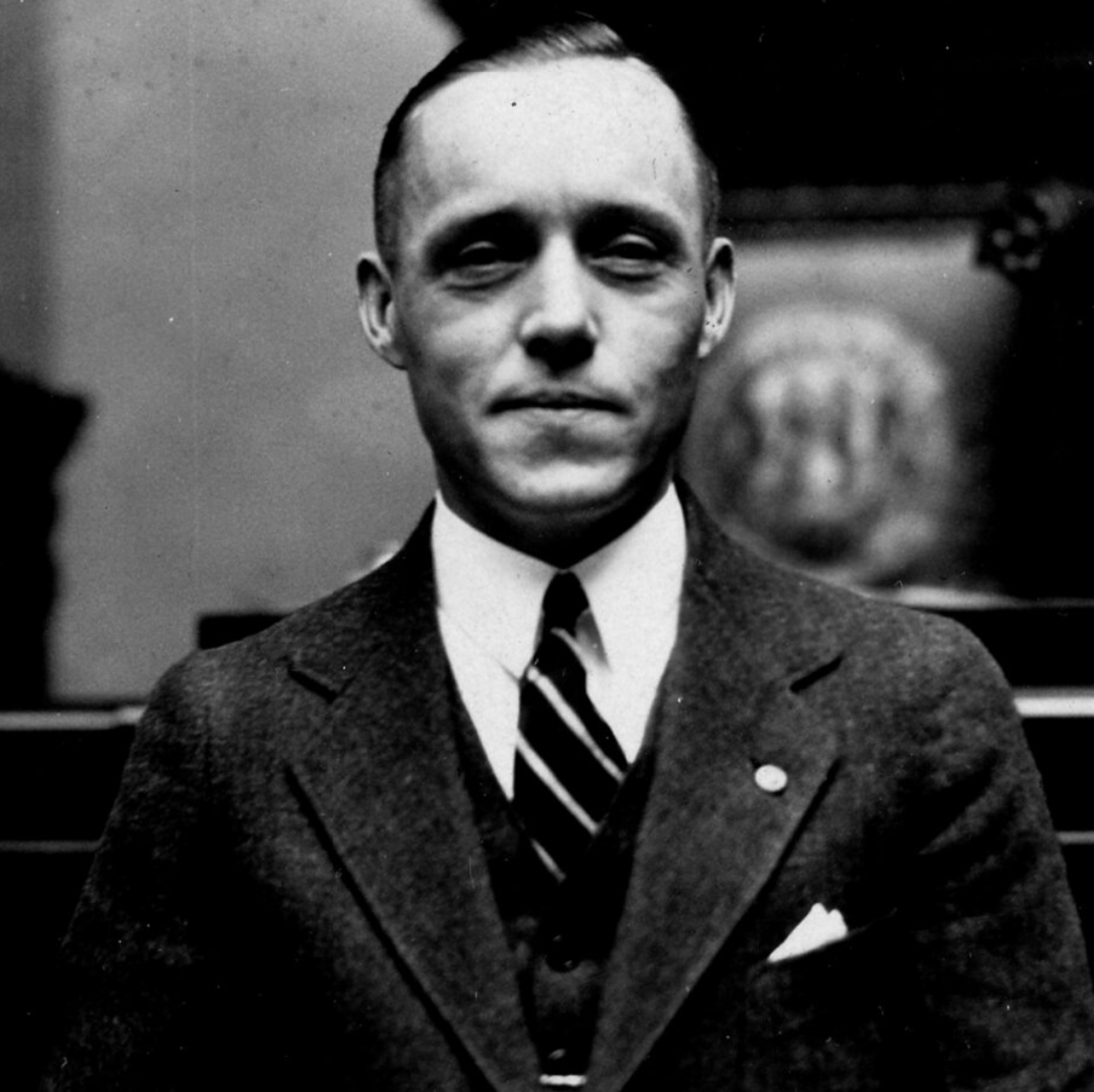
- Breathitt in 1928

Member of the Kentucky Senate from the 6th district
- In office January 1, 1934 – October 29, 1934
- Preceded by: Charles G. Franklin
- Succeeded by: Franklin Rives

35th Lieutenant Governor of Kentucky
- In office December 13, 1927 – December 8, 1931
- Governor: Flem Sampson
- Preceded by: Henry Denhardt
- Succeeded by: Happy Chandler

Personal details
- Born: December 14, 1890 Hopkinsville, Kentucky, U.S.
- Died: October 29, 1934 (aged 43)
- Resting place: Riverside Cemetery, Hopkinsville, Kentucky
- Party: Democratic
- Relations: John Breathitt (great-grand uncle); James Breathitt (father); Edward T. Breathitt (nephew)
- Education: Centre College

Military service
- Allegiance: United States
- Branch/service: United States Navy
- Battles/wars: World War I

James Breathitt Jr. (December 14, 1890 – October 29, 1934) was an American politician who served as the 35th lieutenant governor of Kentucky, and member of the Kentucky Senate.

He was a member of the prominent Breathitt family, and was seen as a rising star of the Kentucky Democratic Party prior to his early death due to illness in 1934.

== Early life and education ==
Breathitt was born on December 14, 1890, in Hopkinsville, Kentucky. His father was James Breathitt, who served as Attorney General of Kentucky from 1908 to 1912. His great-granduncle, John Breathitt, served as the 11th Governor of Kentucky from 1832 until his death in 1834.

He attended Hopkinsville High School where he was manager and captain of the school's football team. He went on to attend Centre College and was assistant manager of the basketball team as well as a member of the Deinologian Literary Society, Ancient Order of Pinheads, and Kappa Alpha Order fraternity. Breathitt graduated from Centre in 1911, was admitted to the Kentucky Bar Association the next year before entering into a law partnership with his father.

In 1912, Breathitt married Natalie Martin, a member of another prominent family from Frankfort. They would have one son, James Breathitt III.

Following the United States' entry into World War I, Breathitt enlisted in the naval aviation corps. After the war, Breathitt would reenter the legal field and become active in the Democratic Party as well as the American Legion.

== Political career ==
=== Democratic National Convention delegate ===
Breathitt was selected as a delegate to both the 1924 and 1928 Democratic National Conventions. During the 1928 convention, he served as chairman of the Kentucky delegation and was an opponent of those who levied criticism against presidential nominee Al Smith on the basis of his Catholicism.

=== Lieutenant Governor ===
In his first foray into elected office, Breathitt won the 1927 election for Lieutenant Governor of Kentucky by only 159 votes, defeating Republican candidate E. E. Nelson. Nelson attempted to challenge these results but was unsuccessful, and Breathitt was sworn in to office on December 13 alongside Governor Flem D. Sampson.

Sampson was the sole republican elected to a constitutional office that year and would face much opposition from both the Kentucky General Assembly and other state leaders throughout his tenure. Over time, Sampson's authority as governor was eroded, culminating in the actions of the 1930 Kentucky General Assembly. That year, the state legislature stripped Sampson of much of his remaining powers and delegated them to a three-man commission composed of Sampson, Breathitt, and Attorney General James W. Cammack. With this move, Breathitt became de facto governor for the remainder of his tenure.

=== State Senator ===
After serving for a year as city attorney of Hopkinsville, Breathitt was elected during the 1933 Kentucky Senate election to represent Kentucky's 6th Senate District, which at the time included Christian and Hopkins counties. However, he died before completing his term.

== Death ==
On October 22, 1934, Breathitt attended the funeral services of J. C. W. Beckham Jr., the son of former Kentucky Governor and United States Senator, J. C. W. Beckham. Breathitt fell ill shortly thereafter, and developed pneumonia. On October 29, Breathitt died at the age of 43 while at his home. His funeral services were held at Grace Episcopal Church.

Political offices
| Preceded by Henry Denhardt | Lieutenant Governor of Kentucky; 1927–1931 | Succeeded by A. B. "Happy" Chandler |
