= Augustus Owsley Stanley =

American politician (1867–1958)

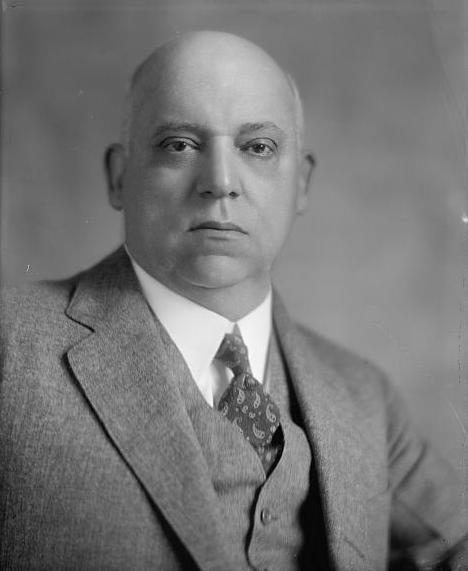
- Stanley, 1905–1945

United States Senator from Kentucky
- In office May 19, 1919 – March 3, 1925
- Preceded by: George B. Martin
- Succeeded by: Frederic M. Sackett

38th Governor of Kentucky
- In office December 7, 1915 – May 19, 1919
- Lieutenant: James D. Black
- Preceded by: James B. McCreary
- Succeeded by: James D. Black

Member of the U.S. House of Representatives from Kentucky's 2nd district
- In office March 4, 1903 – March 3, 1915
- Preceded by: Henry Dixon Allen
- Succeeded by: David Hayes Kincheloe

Personal details
- Born: May 21, 1867 Shelbyville, Kentucky, U.S.
- Died: August 12, 1958 (aged 91) Washington, D.C., U.S.
- Resting place: Frankfort Cemetery
- Party: Democratic
- Spouse: Susan F. Soaper (m. 1903)
- Education: Kentucky Agricultural and Mechanical College; Centre College
- Profession: Politician; lawyer

Augustus Owsley Stanley I (May 21, 1867 – August 12, 1958) was an American politician from Kentucky. Being a former member of the Democratic Party, he served as the 38th governor of Kentucky and also represented the state in both the U.S. House of Representatives and the U.S. Senate. From 1903 to 1915, Stanley represented Kentucky's 2nd congressional district in the House of Representatives, where he gained a reputation as a progressive reformer. Beginning in 1904, he called for an antitrust investigation of the American Tobacco Company, claiming they were a monopsony that drove down prices for the tobacco farmers of his district. As a result of his investigation, the Supreme Court of the United States ordered the breakup of the American Tobacco Company in 1911. Stanley also chaired a committee that conducted an antitrust investigation of U.S. Steel, which brought him national acclaim. Many of his ideas were incorporated into the Clayton Antitrust Act.

During an unsuccessful senatorial bid in 1914, Stanley assumed an anti-prohibition stance. This issue would dominate his political career for more than a decade and put him at odds with J. C. W. Beckham, the leader of the pro-temperance faction of the state's Democratic Party. In 1915, Stanley ran for governor, defeating his close friend Edwin P. Morrow by just over 400 votes in the closest gubernatorial race in the state's history. Historian Lowell H. Harrison called Stanley's administration the apex of the Progressive Era in Kentucky. Among the reforms adopted during his tenure were a state antitrust law, a campaign finance reform law, and several labor laws. In 1918, Stanley was chosen as the Democratic nominee to succeed the recently deceased senator Ollie M. James. Stanley was elected, but did not resign as governor to take the seat until May 1919 and accomplished little in his single term. He lost his re-election bid to Frederic M. Sackett in the 1924 Republican landslide and never again held elected office. He died in Washington, D.C., on August 12, 1958.

== Early life ==
Augustus Owsley Stanley was born in Shelbyville, Kentucky, on May 21, 1867; he was the eldest of seven children of William and Amanda (Owsley) Stanley. His father was a minister of the Disciples of Christ and served as a judge advocate on the staff of Joseph E. Johnston in the Confederate Army. His mother was the niece of former Kentucky governor William Owsley. He attended Gordon Academy in Nicholasville, Kentucky, and the Kentucky Agricultural and Mechanical College (later the University of Kentucky) before graduating with an A.B. from Centre College in 1889. At both Centre and Kentucky A&M, he competed at the State Oratorical Contest, becoming the only such competitor to represent two different institutions.

For a year after graduation, Stanley served as chair of belles-lettres at Christian College in Hustonville, Kentucky. The following year, he was principal of Marion Academy in Bradfordsville, then spent two years in the same position at Mackville Academy in Mackville. While he held these positions, he studied law under Gilbert Cassiday. He was admitted to the bar in 1894, and opened his practice in Flemingsburg, Kentucky.

== Political career ==
Stanley's first venture into the political arena was in 1897 when he made an unsuccessful bid to become county attorney of Fleming County. He continued to practice law in Flemingsburg until March 1898 when he moved to Henderson because of financial hardships. He served as a Democratic presidential elector on the ticket of William Jennings Bryan in 1900.

=== House of Representatives ===
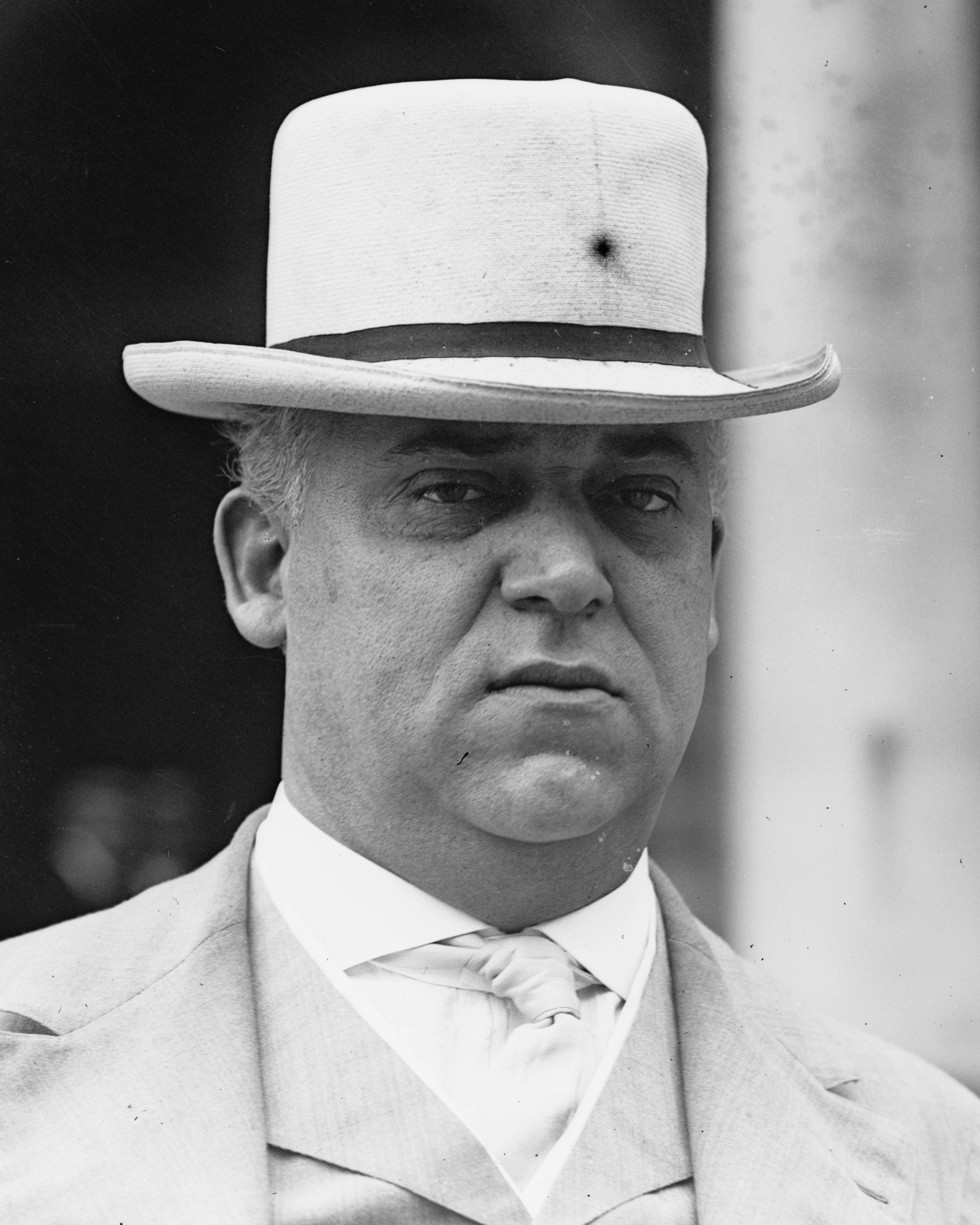
Augustus O. Stanley in Washington, D. C.

In 1902, Stanley was elected as a U.S. Representative from Kentucky's 2nd congressional district. During his tenure in the House, he served on the Committee on Mines and Mining, the Committee on Territories, and the Committee on Agriculture. He advocated for progressive reforms such as more extensive study of mine accident prevention, railroad regulation, a pure food and drug act, and an eight-hour work day.

By the time of Stanley's election to the House, the American Tobacco Company had eliminated all its substantial competitors either by acquisition or by driving them out of business. The company worked with British tobacco manufacturers to set tobacco prices worldwide. Congressman Stanley came to the defense of the tobacco farmers of his district, making him virtually unbeatable as a congressional candidate. In the first of his five consecutive terms, he authored a bill that would remove an oppressive national tobacco tax, hoping this would help raise prices for unprocessed tobacco. The bill was defeated by extensive lobbying efforts by the American Tobacco Company. In 1904, he convinced the Ways and Means Committee to hold public hearings on the American Tobacco Company's monopolistic actions, but the hearings did not convince legislators to repeal the tax nor take action against the American Tobacco Company.

Besides his legislative efforts on behalf of farmers, Stanley also directly encouraged them to organize and keep their crops off the market until prices improved. He helped draft the charter for the Dark District Tobacco Planters Association. Some of the more radical members of this group, known as the "Night Riders", used vigilante violence to compel membership in the Association during what became known as the Black Patch Tobacco Wars.

Finally in 1909, Stanley attached his proposed repeal of the tobacco tax as a rider to the Payne–Aldrich Tariff Act. The bill passed the House, but the Senate stripped Stanley's provision. Kentucky Senator Ollie M. James reintroduced the repeal into the Senate version of the bill, and it survived when the bill was passed into law. The repeal resulted in higher tobacco prices, and although Stanley had not been alone in getting the repeal passed, he received much of the credit. In 1911, Stanley's fight against the American Tobacco Company bore fruit, as the Supreme Court ruled the company to be in violation of antitrust laws and broke it into separate companies. Both the tax repeal and the breakup of American Tobacco helped quell the violence perpetrated by the Night Riders.

Stanley gained national notoriety for his actions against U.S. Steel. In 1909, he introduced a resolution calling for an investigation of the company, but it died in the House Rules Committee. A second resolution, introduced in June 1910, passed the House, but was ignored by President William Howard Taft. Stanley introduced a stronger resolution later that month, but it was killed in committee. After Republicans lost control of the house in the 1910 congressional elections, Stanley reintroduced his resolution. House Speaker Champ Clark appointed him as chairman of a nine-member committee to investigate U.S. Steel.

The committee's investigation lasted from May 1911 to April 1912. At its conclusion, the committee split along party lines. Stanley authored the majority report which condemned alleged price fixing by U.S. Steel and censured President Theodore Roosevelt for his role in U.S. Steel's purchase of the Tennessee Coal and Iron Company. The minority report, authored by Republican Augustus P. Gardner, absolved Roosevelt and downplayed the price fixing charges. Stanley's report also recommended a number of changes to strengthen the Sherman Antitrust Act of 1890. Though his recommendations were not enacted into law during his time in the House, many of them were eventually included in the Clayton Antitrust Act of 1914.

=== 1914 senatorial bid ===
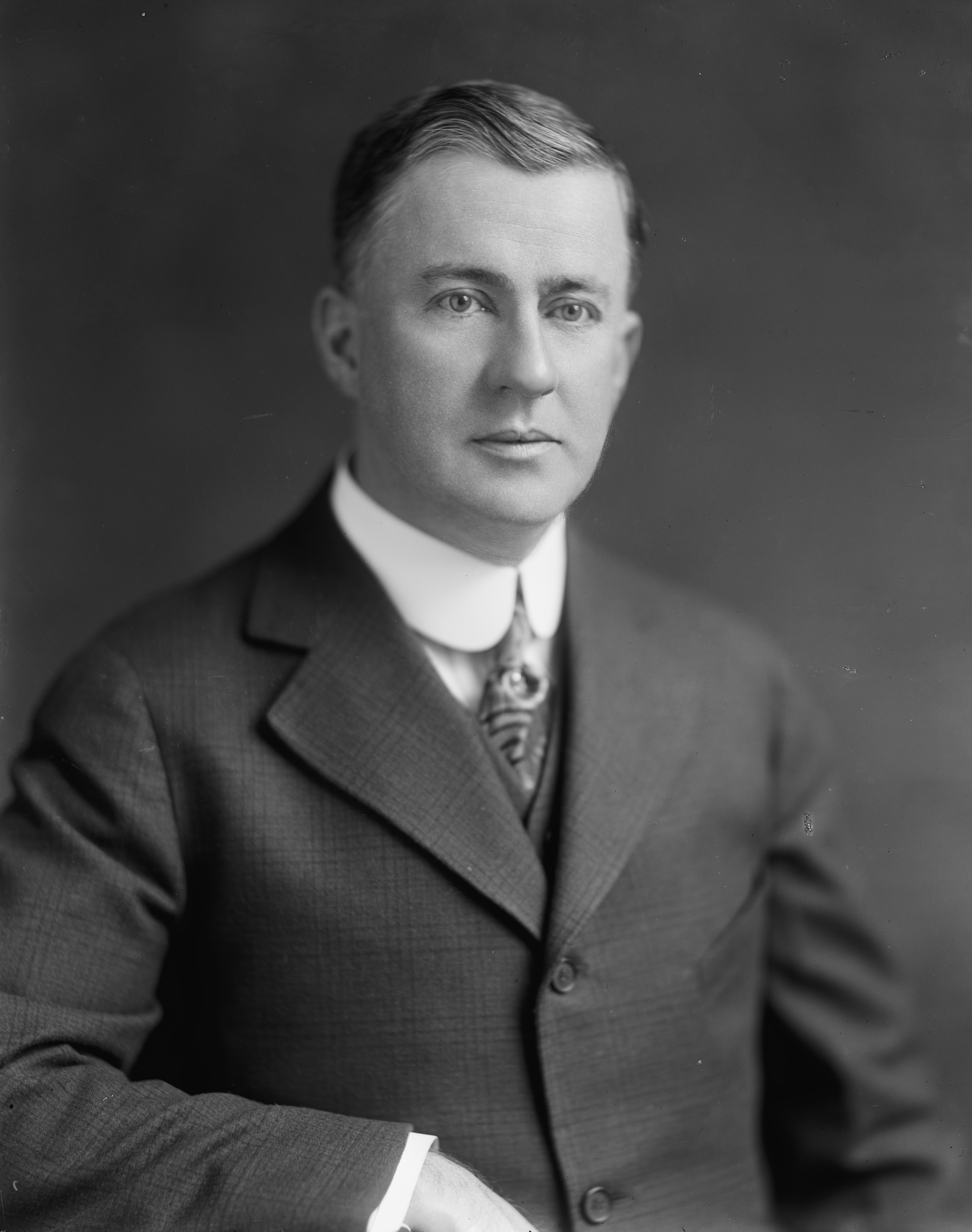
J. C. W. Beckham became Stanley's political enemy for the duration of his political career.

Although he had no serious challengers for his House seat, Stanley declined to seek re-election in 1914, choosing instead to run for a seat in the U.S. Senate. He was one of three Democrats seeking the seat, the others being Governor James B. McCreary and former governor J. C. W. Beckham. McCreary was never a serious challenger, and the primary campaign centered on Stanley and Beckham, the leaders of the two largest factions of the state's Democratic party. The two men disliked each other. Stanley had once referred to Beckham as "a fungus growth on the grave of Goebel" – an allusion to Beckham's former running mate, Governor William Goebel, whose assassination in 1900 had elevated Beckham to the governorship. During the campaign, Stanley criticized Beckham's use of machine politics, calling his opponent "Little Lord Fauntleroy".

Prohibition became the major issue of the campaign. Though both Stanley and Beckham were known to drink liquor, Beckham campaigned on a pro-temperance platform. Stanley, an opponent of prohibition, criticized Beckham's position as hypocritical, saying of pro-temperance politicians in general and Beckham in particular "They keep full of booze and introduce bills to punish the man who sells it to them." "[Beckham] would sell out the world to go to the Senate," he added. The support of Louisville Courier-Journal editor Henry Watterson and Representative Ben Johnson were not enough to carry Stanley to victory. Beckham secured the Democratic nomination by almost 7,000 votes and went on to win the seat in the general election.

=== Governor of Kentucky ===
Several candidates announced their intention to seek the Democratic gubernatorial nomination in 1915, but by late August, only two remained in the race. Stanley was the choice of the anti-prohibition faction of the party, while state superintendent Harry V. McChesney represented the prohibition faction, backed by Beckham. Stanley won the nomination with 107,585 votes to McChesney's 69,722. The Republicans nominated Stanley's close friend Edwin P. Morrow. The two traveled the state together, often speaking from the same stage.

Stanley was a powerful orator who used dramatic flourishes to emphasize his points. He would often loosen his tie before he ever started speaking, and by the end of his speech have thrown off his vest and coat. In one instance, the candidates debated a tax on dog owners of one dollar per dog. Stanley favored the tax, while Morrow contended that everyone should be allowed one dog tax-free. Stanley ridiculed the idea as "Free Old Dog Ring," and sometimes howled like a dog in speeches deriding the proposal. On another occasion Stanley, who had too much to drink, vomited in front of the audience as Morrow spoke. When Stanley took the podium, he remarked, "That just goes to show you what I have been saying all over Kentucky. Ed Morrow plain makes me sick to my stomach."

Democrats had been divided in the primary, but united behind Stanley in the general election. Senators Beckham and Ollie M. James endorsed him, as did Governor James B. McCreary. Samuel Gompers praised Stanley for his opposition to trusts while in Congress; endorsements from local chapters of the American Federation of Labor soon followed. Even Harry McChesney, Stanley's primary opponent, urged Kentuckians to vote a straight Democratic ticket.

The election was too close to call on election night. Knowing that a challenged election would be decided by the heavily Democratic General Assembly, Morrow conceded a week later. Official results showed that Stanley won the election by 471 votes, the closest gubernatorial vote in the state's history.

Historian Lowell H. Harrison called Stanley's administration the apex of the Progressive Era in Kentucky. The most significant legislation passed during the 1916 legislative session were a state antitrust law and a ban on railroads offering free passes to public figures. A Corrupt Practices Act required candidates for office to file reports of their expenses, limited the amount of allowable expenses, and forbade public service corporations from contributing to any campaign. Other accomplishments included initiating the state's first budget program, enacting its first workman's compensation law, and instituting a convict labor law. The one progressive measure that did not pass, a bill granting women's suffrage, failed in the House by a single vote.

Stanley called the General Assembly into special session in February 1917. At issue was reform of the state's tax code, which Stanley felt unjustly burdened agricultural interests. The state was also incurring large deficits, ranging from $100,000 to $700,000 annually. Though Kentucky was in better shape financially than many of its peers, Stanley still sought to balance the budget. The session lasted sixty days, and the legislature passed many of the bills he advocated. The most significant created a three-member state tax commission, chaired by M. M. Logan. Additional taxes were passed on distilled spirits, oil production, race tracks, and corporate licenses. Assessments on the value of property, which had typically been evaluated at one-third to one-half of fair market price, rose dramatically. To balance this increase, legislators reduced the tax rates on certain types of property. With the dramatic increase in funds yielded by the special session, the General Assembly approved funding increases in nearly every part of state government, including higher education. The State Board of Health was given expanded powers, and county boards of health were established.

Stanley's administration was affected by the United States' entry into World War I. The legislature established and funded a state Council of Defense, but Stanley vetoed a bill that would have banned the teaching of German in public schools.

As in his run for Senate and in the gubernatorial primary, the liquor question was central to Stanley's tenure as governor. Although anti-prohibition forces declared prohibition dead following his election, a prohibition amendment was introduced during the first legislative session following it. The amendment failed by a vote of 20–14 in the state senate. In 1918 it was submitted to the state's voters by an overwhelming 95–17 joint vote of the General Assembly. Although Stanley was against prohibition, he supported the 1918 amendment in order to settle the liquor issue and clear the legislature's order paper for other measures. In 1919, Kentucky was the first "wet" state to ratify the Eighteenth Amendment, enshrining prohibition into the national constitution.

=== U.S. Senator ===
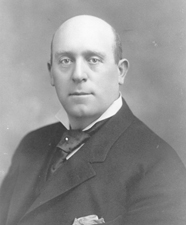
Ollie M. James; Stanley succeeded him in the U.S. Senate.

On August 18, 1918, incumbent senator Ollie M. James died. Stanley appointed George B. Martin to finish James' term, which was to expire on March 3 of the following year. James had already been nominated for re-election in 1918 by the Democratic primary, and the task of selecting the party's new nominee fell to the Democratic State Committee, which nominated Stanley. Stanley enjoyed the advantage of a united Democratic party; J. C. W. Beckham supported Stanley for this seat so Stanley would not challenge him for his own seat when he faced re-election. The Republicans chose a relative unknown, Dr. Ben L. Bruner. Stanley was attacked for his veto of the German language bill and for his long-standing views against temperance. Though the national mood was against the Democrats, a letter of support from President Woodrow Wilson bolstered Stanley's campaign, and he defeated Bruner by more than 5,000 votes. He resigned as governor to assume the Senate seat in May 1919. As a Democrat in a mostly Republican Senate, he wielded little influence.

When Stanley sought re-election to his seat in 1924, he faced an uphill battle. No Kentucky senator had been re-elected to his seat in over forty years (though senators had been popularly elected only since 1914). His opposition to prohibition cost him the support of pro-temperance voters and Democratic governor William J. Fields. He was also opposed by the Ku Klux Klan, then a powerful organization in the state, because of his opposition to bigotry and secret organizations. His Republican opponent Frederic M. Sackett secured the support of the Beckham wing of the Democratic Party. Despite having his own private stock of liquor, Sackett took a pro-temperance position in the campaign and was endorsed by the Anti-Saloon League. Louisville Courier-Journal editor Robert Worth Bingham added his endorsement, calling Sackett "one of the best men I know". In the general election, Stanley lost his seat by almost 25,000 votes. Sackett's victory meant Kentucky would have two Republican senators for the first time in its history.

== Later life and death ==
Following his defeat in the Senate, Stanley returned to his legal practice. In the 1927 gubernatorial election, he threw his support to his old enemy, J. C. W. Beckham, hoping to improve his chances of returning to the Senate in 1930. Beckham lost to Republican Flem D. Sampson, greatly diminishing Stanley's chances in the senatorial campaign.

In 1930, President Herbert Hoover appointed Stanley to the International Joint Commission, a body charged with settling boundary disputes between the United States and Canada. Stanley became its chair in 1933. He was proud of his service on the commission, and once noted that nowhere on earth have two great powers lived so long as neighbors with so few disputes. He served until 1954 when he resigned under pressure from his own party.

Stanley died in Washington, D.C., on August 12, 1958, and was buried in Frankfort Cemetery in Frankfort, Kentucky. He was survived by his wife, Sue (Soaper) Stanley, and two of his three sons, William Stanley and Augustus Owsley Stanley II. His grandson, Augustus Owsley Stanley III (1935–2011), became a well-known LSD chemist and backer of the Grateful Dead during the hippie movement.

== See also ==
Party political offices
Preceded by James B. McCreary	Democratic nominee for Governor of Kentucky; 1915	Succeeded by James D. Black
First	Democratic nominee for U.S. Senator from Kentucky (Class 2); 1918, 1924	Succeeded by Ben M. Williamson
U.S. House of Representatives
Preceded by Henry Dixon Allen	Member of the U.S. House of Representatives from Kentucky's 2nd congressional district 1903–1915	Succeeded by David Hayes Kincheloe
Political offices
Preceded by James B. McCreary	Governor of Kentucky; 1915–1919	Succeeded by James Dixon Black
U.S. Senate
Preceded by George B. Martin	U.S. senator (Class 2) from Kentucky; 1919–1925; Served alongside: J. C. W. Beckham, Richard P. Ernst	Succeeded by Frederic M. Sackett
