= James D. Black =

Governor of Kentucky in 1919

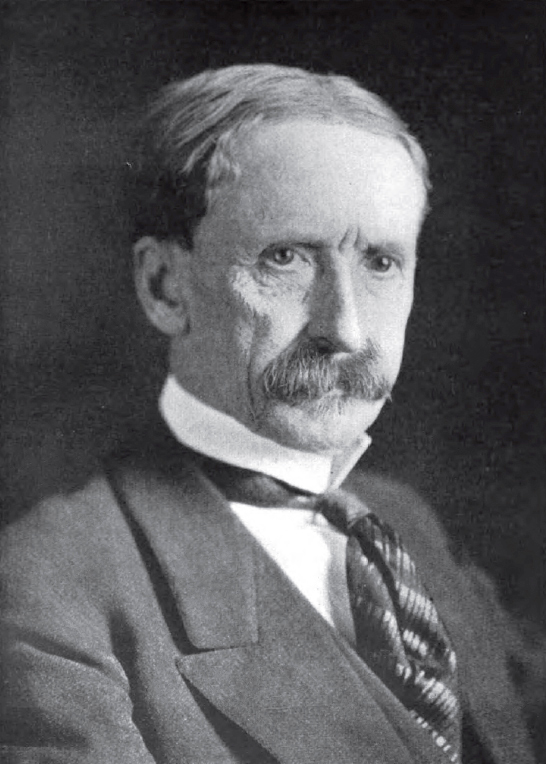

39th Governor of Kentucky
- In office May 19, 1919 – December 9, 1919
- Lieutenant: Vacant
- Preceded by: Augustus O. Stanley
- Succeeded by: Edwin P. Morrow

32nd Lieutenant Governor of Kentucky
- In office December 7, 1915 – May 19, 1919
- Governor: Augustus O. Stanley
- Preceded by: Edward J. McDermott
- Succeeded by: S. Thruston Ballard

Member of the Kentucky House of Representatives from Knox and Whitley Counties
- In office August 2, 1875 – August 6, 1877
- Preceded by: W. W. Sawyers (Bell and Knox); J. T. Freeman (Whitley)
- Succeeded by: James Perkins

Personal details
- Born: September 24, 1849 Knox County, Kentucky, U.S.
- Died: August 5, 1938 (aged 88) Barbourville, Kentucky, U.S.
- Party: Democratic
- Spouse: Mary Jeanette "Nettie" Pitzer
- Education: Tusculum College
- Profession: Attorney

James Dixon Black (September 24, 1849 – August 5, 1938) was an American attorney who was the 39th governor of Kentucky, serving for seven months in 1919. He ascended to the office when Governor Augustus O. Stanley was elected to the U.S. Senate.

Black graduated from Tusculum College in 1872 and taught school while studying law. He was admitted to the bar in 1874 and opened his legal practice in Barbourville, Kentucky. Eventually, his son, Pitzer Dixon, and his son-in-law, Hiram H. Owens, became partners in his practice, called Black, Black and Owens. Deeply interested in education, he served as superintendent of the Knox County public schools for two years, and was instrumental in the founding of Union College in Barbourville. He served as president of the college from 1910 to 1912.

Black was chosen as the Democratic nominee for lieutenant governor in 1915, despite having only meager previous political experience. He was elected on a ticket with Augustus O. Stanley and was elevated to governor when Stanley resigned to take a seat in the U.S. Senate. Much of his seven months as governor were spent on his re-election campaign. He was unable to satisfactorily answer charges of corruption made against the Stanley administration by his opponent, Edwin P. Morrow, who won the election by more than 40,000 votes. Black returned to his legal practice in Barbourville and served as president of a bank founded by his older brother. He was campaign manager for Alben Barkley's senatorial campaign when he died of pneumonia on August 5, 1938.

== Early life and family ==
Black was born on September 24, 1849, nine miles from Barbourville on Richland Creek in Knox County, Kentucky. He was the youngest of twelve children born to John Craig and Clarissa "Cassie" (Jones) Black. Black's older brother, Isaac Jones Black, was captain of the 49th Kentucky Mounted Infantry in the Union Army during the Civil War.

Black was educated in the rural and subscription schools in and around Barbourville. In 1872, he graduated from Tusculum College near Greeneville, Tennessee, with a Bachelor of Arts degree. After college, Black returned to Knox County where he taught in the public schools for two years. Concurrently, he studied law, and was admitted to the bar in August 1874. He opened his legal practice in Barbourville.

Black married Mary Jeanette "Nettie" Pitzer on December 2, 1875, in Barbourville. The couple had three children: Pitzer Dixon, Gertrude Dawn, and Georgia Clarice. All were members of the Methodist Episcopal Church. All three children graduated from what is now Centre College in Danville, Kentucky. Pitzer then went on to study law at the University of Virginia. After being admitted to the bar, he became a partner in his father's law firm. Georgia Black married Hiram Hercules Owens, who also became a partner in the Barbourville firm of Black, Black, and Owens.

== Educational career ==
Black was elected to represent Knox and Whitley counties in the Kentucky House of Representatives in 1875. A Democrat representing a district with a majority of Republican voters, he served a single, two-year term.

In 1879, Black and other citizens of Barbourville purchased stock to fund the start up of a new college in Barbourville. Black insisted that the college be named Union College, because he hoped the college would unify the community. He continued to be involved in the development of the college, serving as its attorney and as a fund-raiser. Deeply interested in education, he also served as superintendent of the Knox County public schools in 1884 and 1885, but returned to his law practice thereafter.

A long-time Freemason, Black served as master of his local lodge on seven different occasions, was twice high priest of the Barbourville Chapter of the Royal Arch Masons, and was chosen Grand Master of Kentucky in 1888. In 1893, he was chosen by Kentucky governor John Y. Brown as a commissioner to the Chicago World's Columbian Exposition, representing Kentucky's forestry and mineral departments.

On September 10, 1910, Black was named the eighth president of Union College. The following year, his alma mater awarded him an honorary Doctor of Laws degree. He served as president of Union College until 1912.

== Political career ==
Black returned to politics in 1912 when he became Kentucky's first assistant attorney general. In 1915, he was chosen as the Democratic nominee for lieutenant governor. Black was pro-temperance, and was chosen to balance the ticket with Augustus O. Stanley, who opposed prohibition. While Black defeated his opponent, Lewis L. Walker, by more than 8,000 votes, Stanley bested Republican Edwin P. Morrow by only 421 votes, the closest gubernatorial election in the state's history.

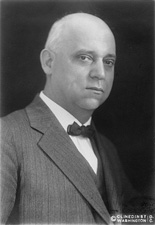
Augustus O. Stanley, Black's running mate in the 1915 gubernatorial election

Though Stanley and Black won the election, they never became political allies. At the time of their election and service, the Kentucky Constitution prescribed that the lieutenant governor would act as governor any time the governor left the state. Consequently, Stanley refused to travel out of state on vacation because he feared he would not approve of anyone Black would appoint to any unfilled governmental offices while he was gone.

Black ascended to the governorship on May 19, 1919, when Governor Stanley resigned to assume a seat in the U.S. Senate. His pro-temperance stand cost him many of Stanley's supporters, while his association with Stanley, a prohibition opponent, caused his support to wane among prohibitionists. There was no legislative session of the General Assembly during Black's term, so potential conflicts with the legislature were avoided.

Black immediately faced accusations of poor appointments by Stanley. The School Textbook Commission was singled out for particular criticism. The Kentucky Court of Appeals had ruled that the Commission acted illegally in selecting textbooks submitted in dummy form. Black called on the commissioners to resign, but when they refused, he claimed he had no power to remove them except for fraud or corruption. The Louisville Courier-Journal pointed out that Black could replace any Stanley appointees that had not yet been confirmed by the Senate, but Black refused to do so. Some believed that Black had agreed to retain Stanley's appointees in exchange for Stanley's support of Black's re-election campaign.

The settlement of state inheritance taxes on two estates also plagued Black. In the first case, Governor Stanley had made a compromise settlement of back taxes with L. V. Harkness before his death. The compromise was criticized, and although Black asked the attorney general to investigate, the case was not decided during Black's tenure as governor. In the second case, Stanley had appointed three special attorneys to collect inheritance taxes from the estate of Mrs. Robert Worth Bingham. Black wanted the attorneys to resign and save the state their large fees, but refused to remove them outright. This action was made more damning because one of the attorneys was a member of Black's campaign staff.

In 1919, Black was chosen as the Democratic gubernatorial nominee over John D. Carroll, chief justice of the Kentucky Court of Appeals, by more than 20,000 votes. The Republicans again nominated Edwin P. Morrow, who implored voters to "Right the Wrong of 1915". Since Black had very little record as governor in his own right, Morrow campaigned against him by attacking Stanley's administration as corrupt. Morrow cited as evidence the tax cases of Mr. Harkness and Mrs. Bingham and Black's inaction against the State Textbook Commission.

Black tried to remain positive in his race, and focused on national issues rather than defending Stanley's administration. He touted his support of President Woodrow Wilson and declared his support for the United States' admission into the League of Nations. His support of Wilson hurt him with German American voters, and Wilson's handling of recent coal strikes hurt Black with the traditionally Democratic labor vote.

Days before the election, Morrow exposed a contract approved by the state Board of Control to purchase cloth from a man named A. S. J. Armstrong at twice its normal price. Black responded to the allegation by temporarily suspending his campaign and ordering an investigation. The investigation revealed that Armstrong was a plumber who was bidding on behalf of his brother-in-law, a former prison official in the Stanley administration. Despite this revelation, Black refused to remove members of the Board of Control. This issue finally sank Black's candidacy; Morrow won the election by more than 40,000 votes.

In his final days in office, Black considered many requests for executive clemency. On December 1, 1919, he issued a pardon for Henry Youtsey, a recent parolee who had served eighteen years for conspiracy in the assassination of Governor William Goebel.

In 1918, while still serving as lieutenant governor, Black had assumed the presidency of the John A. Black National Bank of Barbourville, named for and founded by his older brother. He became chief prohibition inspector for Kentucky in 1920. Later, he served as director of the Barbourville Cemetery Company. While working as Ninth Congressional District campaign manager for Senator Alben Barkley in 1938, Black developed pneumonia and died on August 5, 1938. He is entombed in a mausoleum at Barbourville Cemetery.

Party political offices
Preceded by Augustus Owsley Stanley	Democratic nominee for Governor of Kentucky; 1919	Succeeded by J. Campbell Cantrill
Political offices
Preceded by Edward J. McDermott	Lieutenant Governor of Kentucky; 1915–1919	Succeeded by S. Thruston Ballard
Preceded by Augustus O. Stanley	Governor of Kentucky; 1919	Succeeded by Edwin P. Morrow
