= Edwin P. Morrow =

American politician (1877–1935)

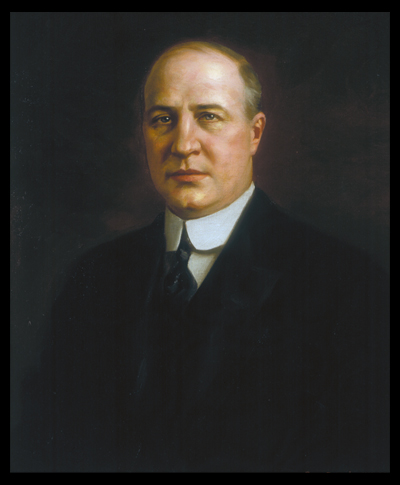

40th Governor of Kentucky
- In office December 9, 1919 – December 11, 1923
- Lieutenant: Thruston Ballard
- Preceded by: James D. Black
- Succeeded by: William J. Fields

U.S. District Attorney for the Eastern District of Kentucky
- In office 1910–1913
- Appointed by: William Howard Taft
- Preceded by: James N. Sharp
- Succeeded by: Thomas D. Slattery

Personal details
- Born: Edwin Porch Morrow; November 28, 1877 Somerset, Kentucky, U.S.
- Died: June 15, 1935 (aged 57) Frankfort, Kentucky, U.S.
- Resting place: Frankfort Cemetery
- Party: Republican
- Spouse: Katherine Hale Waddle
- Relations: Son of Thomas Z. Morrow; Nephew of William O. Bradley
- Education: University of Cincinnati Law School (LLB)
- Profession: Lawyer

Military service
- Branch/service: U.S. Army
- Years of service: 1898–1899
- Rank: Second lieutenant
- Unit: 4th Kentucky Infantry Regiment
- Battles/wars: Spanish–American War

Edwin Porch Morrow (November 28, 1877 – June 15, 1935) was an American politician, who served as the 40th governor of Kentucky from 1919 to 1923. He was the only Republican elected to this office between 1907 and 1927. He championed the typical Republican causes of his day, namely equal rights for African-Americans and the use of force to quell violence. Morrow had been schooled in his party's principles by his father, Thomas Z. Morrow, who was its candidate for governor in 1883, and his uncle, William O. Bradley, who was elected governor in 1895. Both men were founding members of the Republican Party in Kentucky.

After rendering non-combat service in the Spanish–American War, Morrow graduated from the University of Cincinnati Law School in 1902 and opened his practice in Lexington, Kentucky. He made a name for himself almost immediately by securing the acquittal of a black man charged with murder based on an extorted confession and perjured testimony. He was appointed U.S. District Attorney for the Eastern District of Kentucky by President William Howard Taft in 1910 and served until he was removed from office in 1913 by President Woodrow Wilson. In 1915, he ran for governor against his good friend, Augustus O. Stanley. Stanley won the election by 471 votes, making the 1915 contest the closest gubernatorial race in the state's history.

Morrow ran for governor again in 1919. His opponent, James D. Black, had ascended to the governorship earlier that year when Stanley resigned to take a seat in the U.S. Senate. Morrow encouraged voters to "Right the Wrong of 1915" and ran on a progressive platform that included women's suffrage and quelling racial violence. He charged the Democratic administration with corruption, citing specific examples, and won the general election in a landslide. With a friendly legislature in 1920, he passed much of his agenda into law, including an anti-lynching law and reorganizing state government. He won national acclaim for preventing the lynching of a black prisoner in 1920. He was not hesitant to remove local officials who did not deter or quell mob violence. By 1922, Democrats regained control of the General Assembly, and Morrow could not accomplish much in the second half of his term. Following his term as governor, he served on the United States Railroad Labor Board and the Railway Mediation Board but never again held elected office. He died of a heart attack on June 15, 1935, while living with a cousin in Frankfort.

== Early life ==
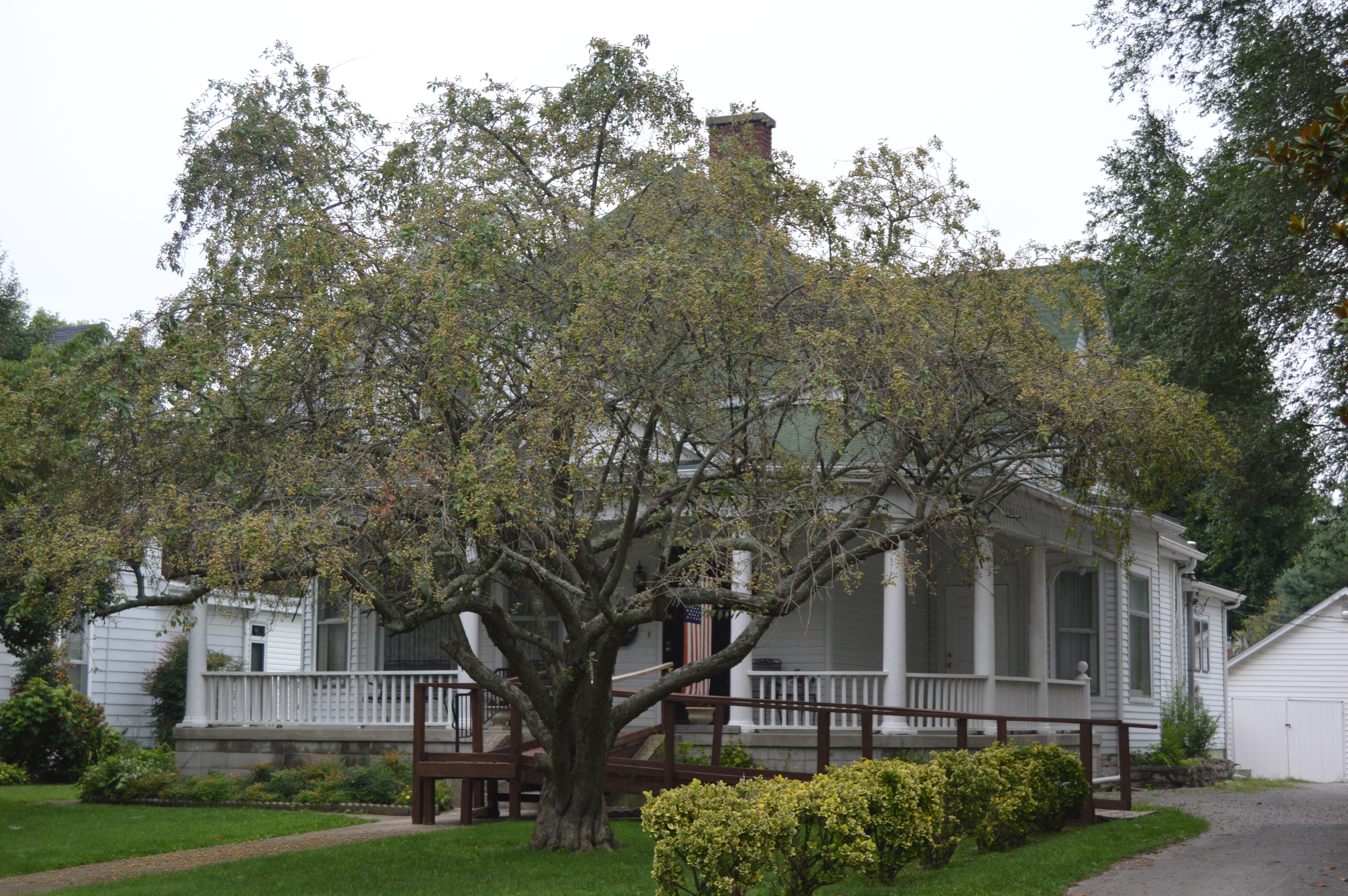
Morrow's house in Somerset

Edwin Morrow was of Scottish descent and was born to Thomas Zanzinger and Virginia Catherine (Bradley) Morrow in Somerset, Kentucky, on November 28, 1877. He and his twin brother, Charles, were the youngest of eight children. His father was one of the founders of the Republican Party in Kentucky and an unsuccessful candidate for governor in 1883. His mother was a sister to William O'Connell Bradley, who was elected the first Republican governor of Kentucky in 1895. Morrow's great-grandfather Thomas Morrow emigrated to America from Scotland before the Revolutionary War.

Morrow's early education was in the public schools of Somerset. At age 14, he entered preparatory school at St. Mary's College near Lebanon, Kentucky. He continued there throughout 1891 and 1892. From there, he enrolled at Cumberland College (now the University of the Cumberlands) in Williamsburg, Kentucky, and distinguished himself in the debating society. He was also interested in sports, playing halfback on the football team and left field on the baseball team.

On June 24, 1898, Morrow enlisted as a private in the 4th Kentucky Infantry Regiment for service in the Spanish–American War. He was first stationed at Lexington, Kentucky, and later trained at Anniston, Alabama. Due to a bout with typhoid fever, he never saw active duty and mustered out as a second lieutenant on February 12, 1899. In 1900, he matriculated for the fall semester at the University of Cincinnati Law School. He graduated with a Bachelor of Laws degree in 1902.

Morrow opened his practice in Lexington. He established his reputation in one of his first cases—the trial of William Moseby, a black man accused of murder. Moseby's first trial had ended in a hung jury, but because the evidence against him included a confession (which he later recanted), most observers believed he would be convicted in his second trial. Unable to find a defense lawyer for Moseby, the judge in the case turned to Morrow, who, as a young lawyer, was eager for work. Morrow proved that his client's testimony had been extorted; he had been told that a lynch mob waited outside the jail for him, but no such mob had ever existed. Morrow further showed that other testimony against his client was false. Moseby was acquitted on September 21, 1902.

Morrow returned to Somerset in 1903. There, he married Katherine Hale Waddle on June 18, 1903. Waddle's father had studied law under Morrow's father, and Edwin and Katherine had been playmates, schoolmates, and later sweethearts. The couple had two children, Edwina Haskell in July 1904 and Charles Robert in November 1908.

== Political career ==
In 1904, Morrow was appointed city attorney for Somerset, serving until 1908. President William Howard Taft appointed him U.S. District Attorney for the Eastern District of Kentucky in 1910. He continued in this position until he was removed from office by President Woodrow Wilson in 1913.

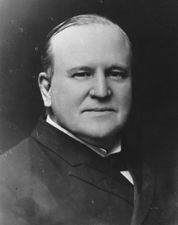
William O. Bradley, Morrow's uncle, was elected governor of Kentucky in 1895.

Morrow's first political experience was working on his uncle William O. Bradley's gubernatorial campaign in 1895. In 1899, Republican gubernatorial candidate William S. Taylor offered to make Morrow his Secretary of State in exchange for Bradley's support in the election; Bradley refused. Despite the encouragement of friends, Morrow declined to run for governor in 1911.

In 1912, Morrow was chosen as the Republican candidate for the Senate seat of Thomas Paynter. Paynter had decided not to seek re-election, and the Democrats nominated Ollie M. James of Crittenden County. The General Assembly was heavily Democratic and united behind James. On a joint ballot, James defeated Morrow by a vote of 105–28. Due to the passage of the Seventeenth Amendment the following year, this was the last time the Kentucky legislature would elect a senator.

At the state Republican convention in Lexington on June 15, 1915, Morrow was chosen as the Republican candidate for governor over Latt F. McLaughlin. His Democratic opponent was his close friend, Augustus O. Stanley. Morrow charged previous Democratic administrations with corruption and called for the election of a Republican because "You cannot clean house with a dirty broom." Both men ran on progressive platforms, and the election went in Stanley's favor by only 471 votes. Although it was the closest gubernatorial vote in the state's history, Morrow refused to challenge the results, which significantly increased his popularity. His decision was influenced by the fact that a challenge would be decided by the General Assembly, which had a Democratic majority in both houses.

=== Governor of Kentucky ===
Morrow served as a delegate to the Republican National Convention in 1916, 1920, and 1928. In 1919, he was chosen by acclamation as his party's candidate for governor. This time, his opponent was James D. Black. Black was Stanley's lieutenant governor and had ascended to the governorship in May 1919 when Stanley resigned to take a seat in the U.S. Senate.

Morrow encouraged the state's voters to "Right the Wrong of 1915". He again ran on a progressive platform, advocating an amendment to the state constitution to grant women's suffrage. His support was not as strong for a prohibition amendment. He attacked the Stanley–Black administration as corrupt. Days before the election, he exposed a contract the state Board of Control awarded to a non-existent company. Historian Lowell H. Harrison argued that Black's refusal to remove the members of the board following this revelation probably sealed his defeat. Morrow won the general election by more than 40,000 votes. It was the largest margin of victory for a Republican gubernatorial candidate in the state's history.

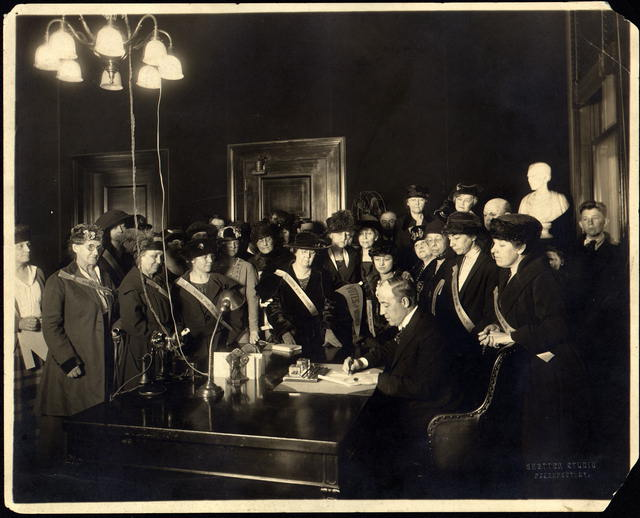
Morrow signs the bill ratifying the 19th Amendment, Kentucky Equal Rights Association members look on in celebration, January 6, 1920.

On January 6, 1920, Governor Morrow signed the bill ratifying the Nineteenth Amendment, making Kentucky the 23rd state to ratify it, and the moment is captured in a photograph with members of the Kentucky Equal Rights Association. During the 1920 legislative session, the Republicans held a majority in the state House of Representatives and were a minority by only two votes in the state Senate. During the session, Morrow was often able to convince C. W. Burton, a Democratic senator from Grant County, to support Republican proposals. Tie votes in the Senate were broken by Republican lieutenant governor S. Thruston Ballard. Consequently, Morrow was able to effect a considerable reorganization of the state government, including replacing the Board of Control with a nonpartisan Board of Charities and Corrections, centralizing highway works, and revising property taxes. He oversaw improvements to the education system, including better textbook selection and a tax on racetracks to support a minimum salary for teachers. Among Morrow's reforms that did not pass was a proposal to make the judiciary nonpartisan.

Morrow urged enforcement of state laws against carrying concealed weapons and restricted activities of the Ku Klux Klan. During his first year in office, he granted only 100 pardons. This was a considerable decrease from the number granted by his immediate predecessors. During their first years in office, J. C. W. Beckham granted 350 pardons, James B. McCreary (during his second stint as governor) granted 139, and Augustus O. Stanley granted 257. He was also an active member of the Commission on Interracial Cooperation, a society for the elimination of racial violence in the South.

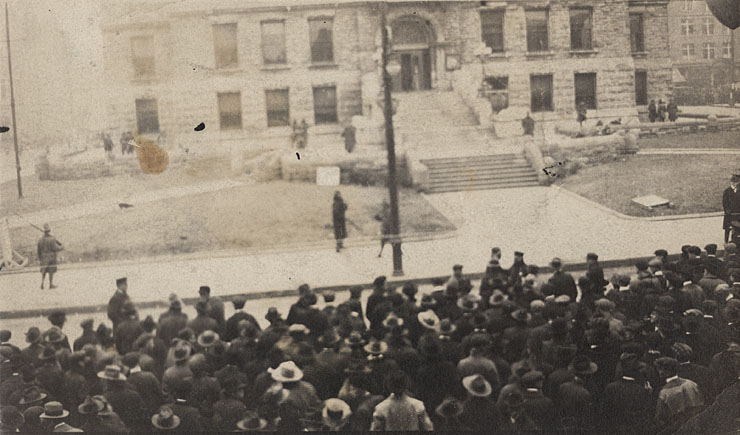
A mob gathered outside the courthouse during the trial of Will Lockett in 1920.

On February 9, 1920, Morrow dispatched the Kentucky National Guard to Lexington to protect Will Lockett, a black World War I veteran on trial for murder. Morrow told the state adjutant general "Do as much as you have to do to keep that negro in the hands of the law. If he falls into the hands of the mob I do not expect to see you alive." Lockett had already confessed, without the benefit of a lawyer, to the murder. His trial took only thirty minutes as he pleaded guilty but asked for a life sentence instead of death. Despite his plea, he was sentenced to die in the electric chair.

A crowd of several thousand gathered outside the courthouse while Lockett's trial was underway. A cameraman asked a large group of those gathered to shake their fists and yell so he could get a picture. The rest of the crowd mistakenly believed they were storming the courthouse and rushed forward. In the ensuing skirmish, one policeman was injured so badly that his arm was later amputated. The National Guard opened fire, killing six people and wounding approximately fifty. Some members of the mob looted nearby stores in search of weapons to retaliate, but reinforcements arrived from a nearby army post by mid-afternoon. Martial law was declared, and no further violence was perpetrated. A month later, Lockett was executed at the Kentucky State Penitentiary in Eddyville.

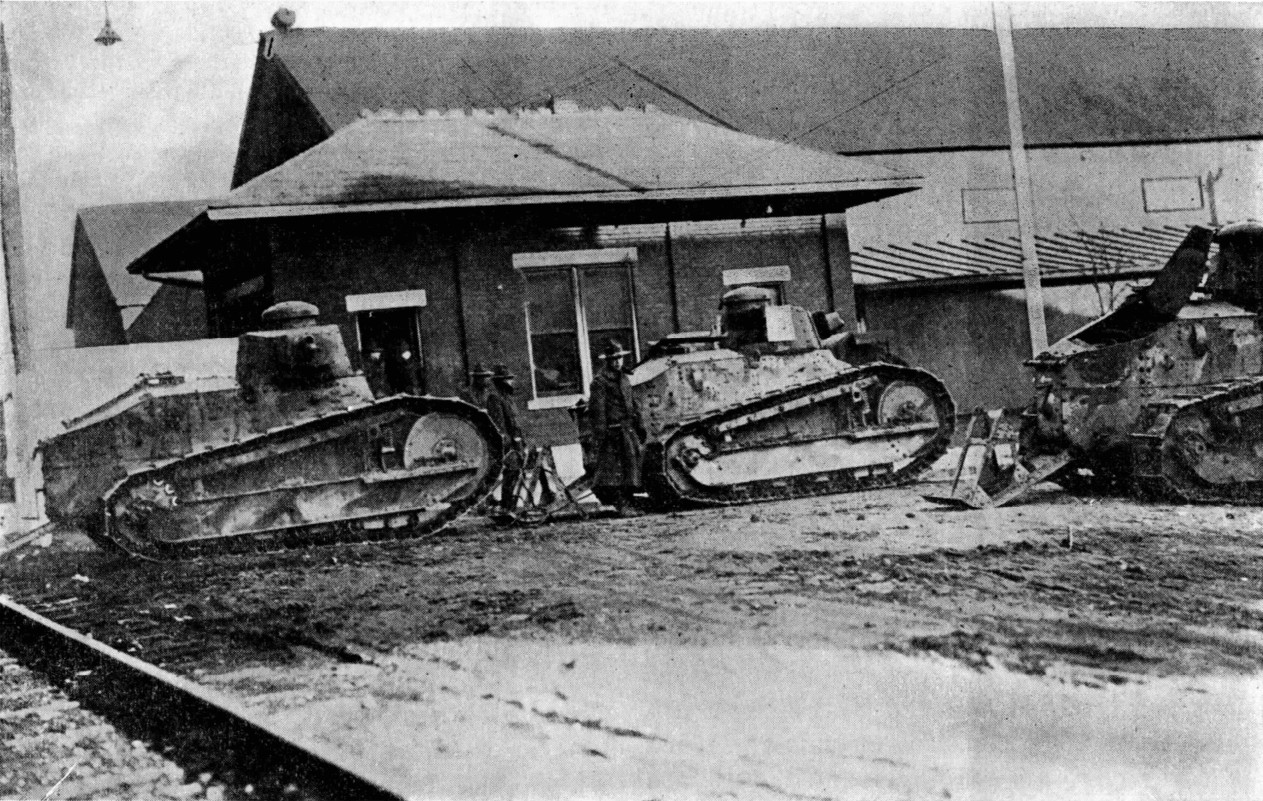
Tanks in Newport during the 1921-28 mill strike.

The incident is believed to be the first forceful suppression of a lynch mob by state and local officials in the South. Morrow received a laudatory telegram from the NAACP, and most of the national press regarding the incident was favorable. W. E. B. Du Bois called it the "Second Battle of Lexington". Morrow was consistent in his use of state troops to end violence in the state. In 1922, he again dispatched the National Guard to quell a mill strike in Newport.

Morrow also demanded consistency from local law enforcement officials. In 1921, he removed the Woodford County jailer from office because he allowed a black inmate to be lynched and offered a reward of $25,000 for information leading to the arrest and conviction of the perpetrators. Citizens of Versailles were more outraged that the jailer had been removed from office than that the prisoner had been lynched. The locals refused to aid in the investigation, and the lynchers were never arrested or charged. Local officials appointed the jailer's wife to finish his term in an attempt to skirt the removal.

In August 1922, a traveling salesman named Jack Eaton was arrested for allegedly assaulting several young girls. The girls' parents refused to press charges, and Eaton was released. Later, he was captured by a mob, who cut him several times and poured turpentine into his wounds. An investigation found that the Scott County sheriff had willfully delivered Eaton to the mob, and Morrow removed him from office. Though Eaton was a white man, blacks were elated with the removal because they hoped it would encourage other jailers to step up efforts to protect against lynchings and mob violence.

Morrow was frequently mentioned as a potential candidate for vice president in 1920. Still, he withdrew his name from consideration, sticking to a campaign promise not to seek a higher office while governor. On July 27, 1920, he made a speech in Northampton, Massachusetts, officially notifying Calvin Coolidge of his nomination for that office. Although he supported Frank O. Lowden for president, the nomination went to Warren G. Harding, and Morrow campaigned vigorously on behalf of his party's ticket.

In his address to the 1922 legislature, Morrow asked for $50 million for improvements to the state highway system and the repeal of all laws denying equal rights to women. He also recommended a large bond issue to finance improvements to the state's universities, schools, prisons, and hospitals. By this time, however, the Republicans had surrendered their majority in the state House, and practically all of Morrow's proposals were voted down. Morrow countered by vetoing several Democratic bills, including $700,000 in appropriations. Among the few accomplishments of the 1922 legislature were the passage of an anti-lynching law, the abolition of convict labor, and the establishment of normal schools at Murray and Morehead. Today, these schools are Murray State University and Morehead State University, respectively. The 1922 legislature also established a commission to govern My Old Kentucky Home State Park and approved construction of the Jefferson Davis Monument.

Although Morrow gained national praise for his handling of the Lockett trial, historian James C. Klotter opined that he "left behind a solid, and rather typical, record for a Kentucky governor." He cited Morrow's fiscal conservatism and inability to control the legislature in 1922 as reasons for his lackluster assessment. However, he praised Morrow's advancement of racial equality in the state. The state constitution prohibited Morrow from seeking a second consecutive term, and the achievements of his administration were not significant enough to ensure the election of Charles I. Dawson, his would-be Republican successor in the gubernatorial election of 1923.

=== Later career and death ===
Following his term as governor, Morrow retired to Somerset, where he became active in the Watchmen of the Republic, an organization devoted to eradicating prejudice and promoting tolerance. He served on the United States Railroad Labor Board from 1923 to 1926 and its successor, the Railway Mediation Board, from 1926 to 1934. He resigned to run for a seat in the U.S. House of Representatives representing the Ninth District, but lost his party's nomination to John M. Robsion.

Following his defeat in the congressional primary, Morrow planned to return to Lexington to resume his law practice. On June 15, 1935, he died unexpectedly of a heart attack while temporarily living with a cousin in Frankfort. He is buried in Frankfort Cemetery.

Political offices
| Preceded by James D. Black | Governor of Kentucky; 1919–1923 | Succeeded by William J. Fields |
Party political offices
| Preceded by Edward C. O'Rear | Republican nominee for Governor of Kentucky; 1915, 1919 | Succeeded by Charles I. Dawson |
