= Lieutenant Governor of Kentucky =

Elected US official

- Commonwealth seal

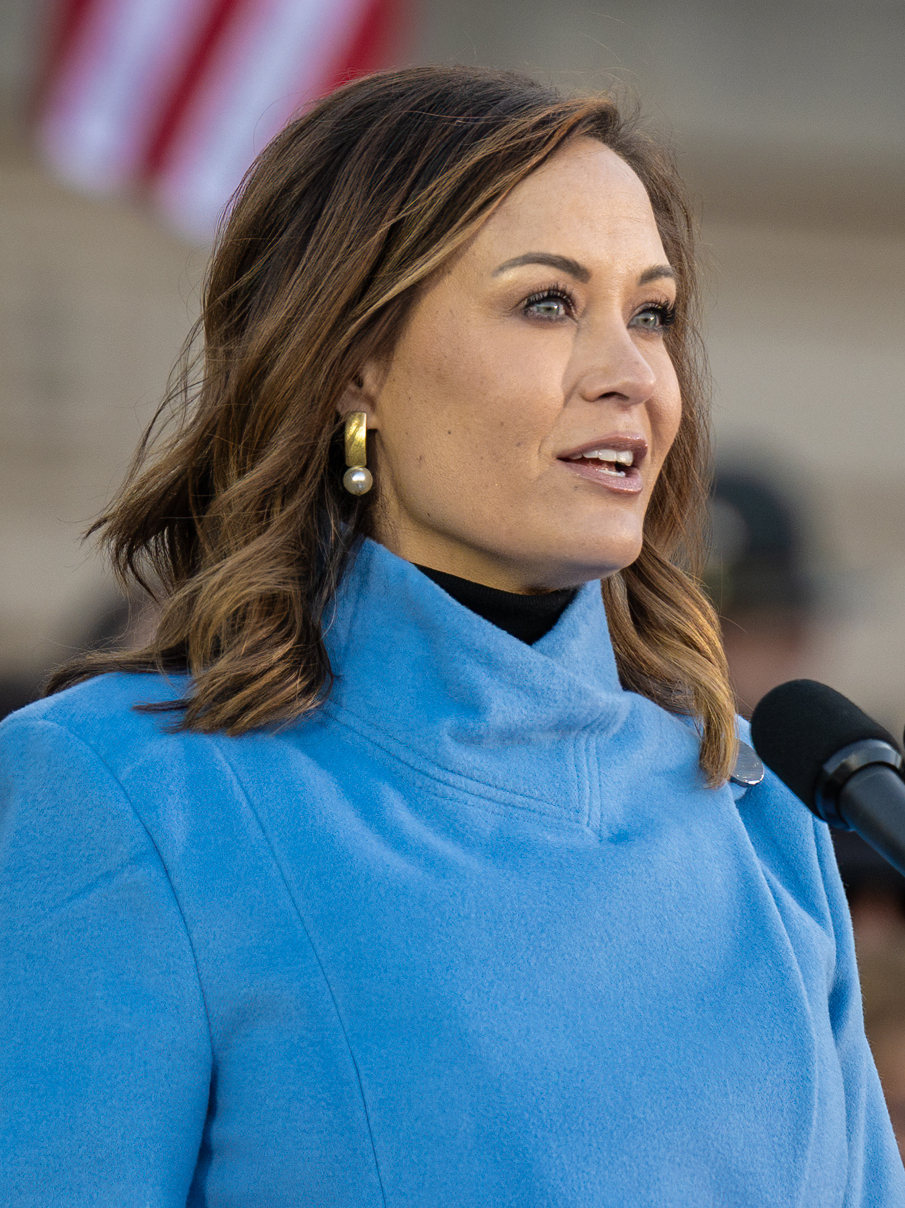
- Incumbent; Jacqueline Coleman since December 10, 2019
- Government of Kentucky
- Style: The Honorable
- Term length: Four years, renewable once consecutively
- Inaugural holder: Alexander Scott Bullitt (1800)
- Formation: Kentucky Constitution
- Succession: First
- Salary: $139,724.88
- Website: http://ltgovernor.ky.gov

The lieutenant governor of Kentucky was created under the state's second constitution, which was ratified in 1799. The inaugural officeholder was Alexander Scott Bullitt, who took office in 1800 following his election to serve under James Garrard in 1799. The lieutenant governor becomes governor of Kentucky under circumstances similar to those under which the vice president of the United States assumes the presidency. The current lieutenant governor is Democrat Jacqueline Coleman, who has been office since December 10, 2019.

== Duties of the Kentucky lieutenant governor ==
As specified in Kentucky Revised Statute 11.400, it states:

11.400 Duties of Lieutenant Governor. (1) In addition to the duties prescribed for the office by the Constitution of the Commonwealth of Kentucky, the duties of the Lieutenant Governor shall be as follows: (a) To serve as vice chairman of the State Property and Buildings Commission as prescribed by KRS 56.450; (b) To serve as vice chairman of the Kentucky Turnpike Authority as prescribed in KRS 175.430; (c) To serve as a member of the Kentucky Council on Agriculture in accordance with KRS 247.417; (d) To appoint one (1) member of the Public Officials' Compensation Commission as provided in KRS 64.742; (e) To serve as a member of the Board of the Kentucky Housing Corporation in accordance with KRS 198A.030; and (f) To serve as a member of Kentucky delegations on the following interstate compact commissions or boards: 1. The Southern Growth Policies Board as prescribed by KRS 147.585; 2. The Breaks Interstate Park Commission as provided in KRS 148.225; 3. The Falls of the Ohio Interstate Park Commission pursuant to KRS 148.242; 4. The Tennessee-Tombigbee Waterway Development Authority pursuant to KRS 182.305; 5. The Interstate Water Sanitation Control Commissions as prescribed by KRS 224.18-710; and 6. The Kentucky Mining Advisory Council for the Interstate Mining Compact as provided by KRS 350.310. (2) Nothing in this section shall prohibit the Governor and Lieutenant Governor from agreeing upon additional duties within the executive branch of the state government to be performed by the Lieutenant Governor. Effective: June 26, 2007

== Changes by 1992 amendment ==
The role and powers of the lieutenant governor of Kentucky were altered by a 1992 amendment to the Constitution of Kentucky. Prior to that 1992 amendment to the Constitution of Kentucky the lieutenant governor became acting governor at any time that the governor was outside of the commonwealth. Lieutenant governors Thelma Stovall (1975–1979) and Happy Chandler (1931–1935) engaged in high-profile use of their powers as acting governor when the elected governor was out of the commonwealth.

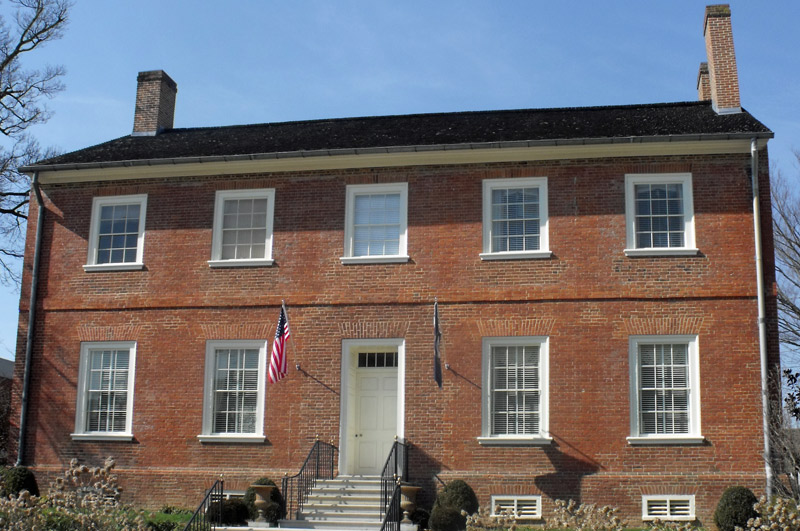
Kentucky's first governor's mansion served as the lieutenant governor's official residence for many years.

Also prior to the 1992 amendment of the Constitution of Kentucky, the lieutenant governor of Kentucky presided over the Kentucky Senate, casting a vote only in the event of a tie. The 1992 constitutional amendment supplanted the office of President pro tempore of the Kentucky Senate with the new office of President of the Kentucky Senate as presiding officer and abolished the lieutenant governor's duties involving the Senate. As a result, the lieutenant governor has no ongoing constitutional duties, and his or her traditional use of the Old Governor's Mansion as an official residence has been phased out.

Candidates for governor and lieutenant governor in Kentucky run together on party slates. This is the result of the same 1992 constitutional amendment; prior to that the candidates for both offices ran separately and, as a result, sometimes the two elected to those offices were not allies and did not work together. This was famously highlighted when then-Lt. Gov. A. B. "Happy" Chandler in 1935 and then-Lt. Gov. Thelma Stovall in 1978 called the Kentucky General Assembly into session to enact legislation that was not advocated by the governors at the time (Ruby Laffoon and Julian Carroll, respectively). In 1967 a Republican, Louie Nunn, was elected governor and a Democrat, Wendell H. Ford, was elected lieutenant governor; they served together in that way for four years.

== List of lieutenant governors ==
Democratic (29) Democratic-Republican (5) National Republican (1) Free Soil (0) Republican (7) Whig (5)

| # | Image | Name | Political party | Term | Governor(s) served under |
|---|---|---|---|---|---|
| 1 | | Alexander Scott Bullitt | | 1800–1804 | James Garrard |
| 2 | | John Caldwell | | 1804 | Christopher Greenup |
| 3 | | Thomas Posey | Democratic-Republican | 1806–1808 | Christopher Greenup |
| 4 | | Gabriel Slaughter | Democratic-Republican | 1808–1812 | Charles Scott |
| 5 | | Richard Hickman | | 1812–1816 | Isaac Shelby |
| 6 | | Gabriel Slaughter | Democratic-Republican | 1816 | George Madison |
| Office vacant from October 4, 1816 - August 29, 1820 | | | | | Gabriel Slaughter |
| 7 | | William T. Barry | Democratic-Republican | 1820-1824 | George Madison |
| 8 | | Robert B. McAfee | Democratic-Republican | 1824–1828 | Joseph Desha |
| 9 | | John Breathitt | Democratic | 1828–1832 | Thomas Metcalfe |
| 10 | | James T. Morehead | National Republican, Whig | 1832–1834 | John Breathitt |
| Office vacant from September 2, 1834 - August 31, 1836 | | | | | James T. Morehead |
| 11 | | Charles A. Wickliffe | Whig | 1836–1839 | James Clark |
| Office vacant from August 27, 1839 - September 2, 1840 | | | | | Charles A. Wickliffe |
| 12 | | Manlius Valerius Thomson | | 1840–1844 | Robert P. Letcher |
| 13 | | Archibald Dixon | Whig | 1844–1848 | William Owsley |
| 14 | | John LaRue Helm | Whig | 1848–1850 | John J. Crittenden |
| Office vacant from July 31, 1850 - September 2, 1851 | | | | | John L. Helm |
| 15 | | John Burton Thompson | Whig, Know Nothing | 1851–1853 | Lazarus W. Powell |
| 16 | | James Greene Hardy | Know Nothing | 1855–1856 | Charles S. Morehead |
Office vacant from July 16, 1856 - [?] 1859
| 17 | | Linn Boyd | Democratic | 1859 | Beriah Magoffin |
| 18 | | Richard Taylor Jacob | Democratic | 1863–1864 | Thomas E. Bramlette |
| Office vacant from [?] 1864 - September 3, 1867 | | | | | Thomas E. Bramlette |
| 19 | | John W. Stevenson | Democratic | 1867 | John L. Helm |
Office vacant from September 3, 1867 - September 5, 1871
| 20 | | John G. Carlisle | Democratic | 1871–1875 | Preston H. Leslie |
| 21 | | John C. Underwood | Democratic | 1875–1879 | James B. McCreary |
| 22 | | James E. Cantrill | Democratic | 1879–1883 | Luke P. Blackburn |
| 23 | | James R. Hindman | Democratic | 1883–1887 | J. Proctor Knott |
| 24 | | James W. Bryan | Democratic | 1887–1891 | Simon Bolivar Buckner |
| 25 | | Mitchell C. Alford | Democratic | 1891–1895 | John Young Brown |
| 26 | | William J. Worthington | Republican | 1895–1899 | William O. Bradley |
| 27 | | John Marshall | Republican | 1899–1900 | William S. Taylor |
| 28 | | J. C. W. Beckham | Democratic | 1900 | William Goebel |
| – | | Newton Willard Utley (Acting) | | 1902–1903 | J. C. W. Beckham |
| 29 | | William P. Thorne | Democratic | 1903–1907 | J. C. W. Beckham |
| 30 | | William H. Cox | Republican | 1907–1911 | Augustus E. Willson |
| 31 | | Edward J. McDermott | Democratic | 1911–1915 | James B. McCreary |
| 32 | | James D. Black | Democratic | 1915–1919 | Augustus O. Stanley |
| 33 | | S. Thruston Ballard | Republican | 1919–1923 | James D. Black; Edwin P. Morrow |
| 34 | | Henry Denhardt | Democratic | 1923–1927 | William J. Fields |
| 35 | | James Breathitt, Jr. | Democratic | 1927–1931 | Flem D. Sampson |
| 36 | | Happy Chandler | Democratic | 1931–1935 | Ruby Laffoon |
| 37 | | Keen Johnson | Democratic | 1935–1939 | Happy Chandler |
| 38 | | Rodes K. Myers | Democratic | 1939–1943 | Keen Johnson |
| 39 | | Kenneth H. Tuggle | Republican | 1943–1947 | Simeon Willis |
| 40 | | Lawrence W. Wetherby | Democratic | 1947–1950 | Earle Clements |
| 41 | | Emerson Beauchamp | Democratic | 1951–1955 | Lawrence W. Wetherby vacant |
| 42 | | Harry Lee Waterfield | Democratic | 1955–1959 | Happy Chandler |
| 43 | | Wilson W. Wyatt | Democratic | 1959–1963 | Bert Combs |
| 44 | | Harry Lee Waterfield | Democratic | 1963–1967 | Ned Breathitt |
| 45 | | Wendell Ford | Democratic | 1967–1971 | Louie Nunn |
| 46 | | Julian Carroll | Democratic | 1971–1974 | Wendell Ford |
Office vacant from December 28, 1974 - December 9, 1975
| 47 | | Thelma Stovall | Democratic | 1975–1979 | Julian Carroll |
| 48 | | Martha Layne Collins | Democratic | 1979–1983 | John Y. Brown Jr. |
| 49 | | Steve Beshear | Democratic | 1983–1987 | Martha Layne Collins |
| 50 | | Brereton C. Jones | Democratic | 1987–1991 | Wallace Wilkinson |
| 51 | | Paul E. Patton | Democratic | 1991–1995 | Brereton C. Jones |
| 52 | | Steve Henry | Democratic | 1995–2003 | Paul E. Patton |
| 53 | | Steve Pence | Republican | 2003–2007 | Ernie Fletcher |
| 54 | | Daniel Mongiardo | Democratic | 2007–2011 | Steve Beshear |
| 55 | | Jerry Abramson | Democratic | 2011–2014 | Steve Beshear |
| 56 | | Crit Luallen | Democratic | 2014–2015 | Steve Beshear |
| 57 | | Jenean Hampton | Republican | 2015–2019 | Matt Bevin |
| 58 | | Jacqueline Coleman | Democratic | 2019–present | Andy Beshear |

Some accounts also indicate that Kentucky's Confederate government had one lieutenant governor, Horatio F. Simrall, who was elected at the Russellville Convention in 1861. Simrall fled to Mississippi shortly thereafter.

== See also ==
- Governor of Kentucky
