= 1820 Kentucky gubernatorial election =

- August 7, 1820
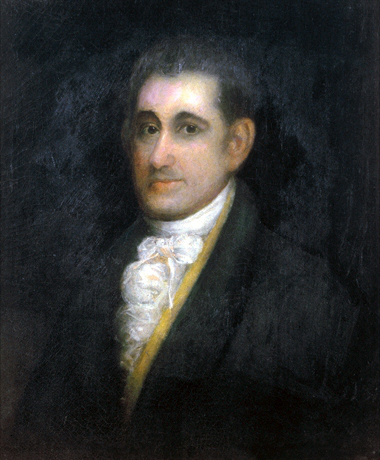

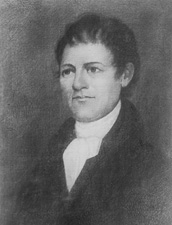

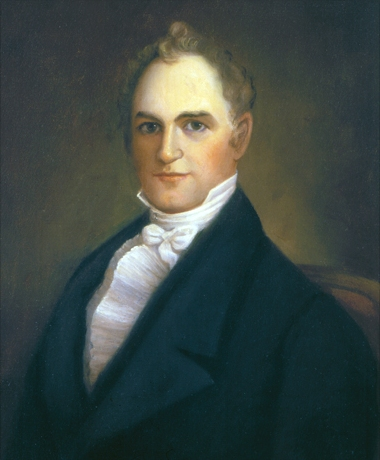

Nominee	John Adair	William Logan
Party	Democratic-Republican	Democratic-Republican
Popular vote	20,493	19,947
Percentage	32.83%	31.95%
Nominee	Joseph Desha	Anthony Butler
Party	Democratic-Republican	Democratic-Republican
Popular vote	12,419	9,567
Percentage	19.89%	15.33%
- Adair: 30–40% 40–50% 50–60% 60–70% 70–80% 80–90% Logan: 30–40% 40–50% 50–60% 60–70% 70–80% 80–90% 90–100% Desha: 30–40% 40–50% 50–60% 60–70% 70–80% 80–90% Butler: 30–40% 40–50% 60–70% 80–90%
Governor before election
Gabriel Slaughter (acting)
Democratic-Republican
Elected Governor
John Adair
Democratic-Republican

The 1820 Kentucky gubernatorial election was held on August 7, 1820.

Acting Democratic-Republican Governor Gabriel Slaughter did not stand for re-election.

Former U.S. Senator John Adair defeated Anthony Butler, Joseph Desha, and William Logan with 32.83% of the vote.

== General election ==
=== Candidates ===
- John Adair, former U.S. Senator
- Anthony Butler, member of the Kentucky House of Representatives
- Joseph Desha, former U.S. Representative
- William Logan, former U.S. Senator

==== Withdrawn ====
- John Emmerson

Adair, Butler, Desha and Emmerson represented the pro-relief faction and Logan represented the anti-relief faction.

=== Results ===
1820 Kentucky gubernatorial election (Note: Some sources give slightly different votes for Butler and Desha.)
Party	Candidate	Votes	%	±%
Democratic-Republican	John Adair	20,493	32.83%	
Democratic-Republican	William Logan	19,947	31.95%	
Democratic-Republican	Joseph Desha	12,419	19.89%	
Democratic-Republican	Anthony Butler	9,567	15.33%	
Majority		546	0.88%	
Turnout		62,426		
Democratic-Republican hold		Swing		

== See also ==
Old Court – New Court controversy
