= 1828 Kentucky gubernatorial election =

- August 4, 1828
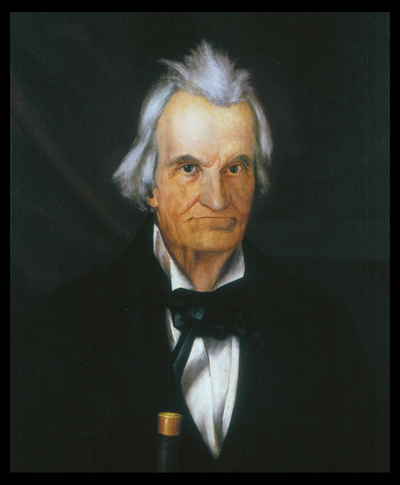

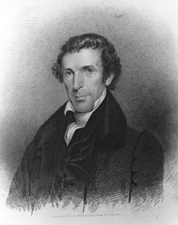
Nominee	Thomas Metcalfe	William T. Barry
Party	National Republican	Democratic
Popular vote	38,930	38,231
Percentage	50.45%	49.55%
- Metcalfe: 50–60% 60–70% 70–80% 80–90% Barry: 50–60% 60–70% 70–80% 80–90%
Governor before election
Joseph Desha
Democratic-Republican
Elected Governor
Thomas Metcalfe
National Republican

The 1828 Kentucky gubernatorial election was held on August 4, 1828.

Incumbent Democratic-Republican Governor Joseph Desha was term-limited, and could not seek a second consecutive term.

National Republican nominee Thomas Metcalfe defeated Democratic nominee William T. Barry with 50.45% of the vote.

== General election ==
=== Candidates ===
- William T. Barry, Democratic, former chief justice of the (New) Kentucky Court of Appeals
- Thomas Metcalfe, National Republican, former U.S. Representative

=== Results ===
1828 Kentucky gubernatorial election
Party	Candidate	Votes	%	±%
National Republican	Thomas Metcalfe	38,930	50.45%	
Democratic	William T. Barry	38,231	49.55%	
Majority		699	0.90%	
Turnout		77,161		
National Republican gain from Democratic-Republican		Swing		

== See also ==
Old Court – New Court controversy
