= Bank of the Commonwealth =

The name Bank of the Commonwealth represents any of the following:

- Bank of the Commonwealth (Kentucky), a historic site in Shepherdsville, Kentucky
- Bank of the Commonwealth (Michigan), a former financial institution headquartered in Detroit, Michigan; acquired by Comerica in 1983
