= John Adair =

Governor, Senator, Representative, and pioneer from Kentucky (1757–1840)

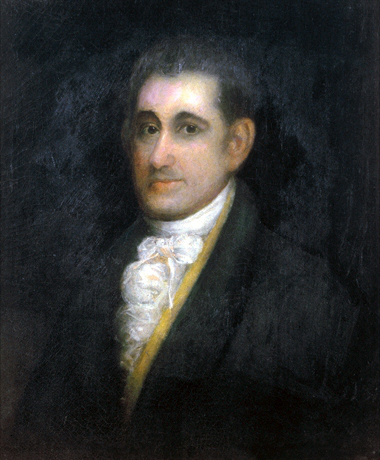
- 1908 portrait

Member of the U.S. House of Representatives from Kentucky's 7th district
- In office March 4, 1831 – March 3, 1833
- Preceded by: John Kincaid
- Succeeded by: Benjamin Hardin

8th Governor of Kentucky
- In office August 29, 1820 – August 24, 1824
- Lieutenant: William T. Barry
- Preceded by: Gabriel Slaughter
- Succeeded by: Joseph Desha

United States Senator from Kentucky
- In office November 8, 1805 – November 18, 1806
- Preceded by: John Breckinridge
- Succeeded by: Henry Clay

4th Speaker of the Kentucky House of Representatives
- In office 1802–1803
- Preceded by: John Breckinridge
- Succeeded by: William Logan

Member of the Kentucky House of Representatives
- In office 1793–1795
- In office 1798

Personal details
- Born: January 9, 1757 Chester County, Province of South Carolina, British America
- Died: May 19, 1840 (aged 83) Harrodsburg, Kentucky, U.S.
- Resting place: Frankfort Cemetery
- Party: Democratic-Republican
- Spouse: Katherine Palmer
- Relations: Thomas Bell Monroe (son-in-law)

Military service
- Allegiance: United States
- Branch/service: South Carolina Militia; Kentucky Militia
- Rank: Brigadier general
- Battles/wars: American Revolutionary War; Northwest Indian War; War of 1812

John Adair (January 9, 1757 – May 19, 1840) was an American pioneer, slave trader, soldier, and politician. He was the eighth governor of Kentucky and represented the state in both the U.S. House and Senate. A native of South Carolina, Adair enlisted in the state militia and served in the Revolutionary War, during which he was twice captured and held as a prisoner of war by the British. Following the War, he was elected as a delegate to South Carolina's convention to ratify the United States Constitution.

After moving to Kentucky in 1786, Adair participated in the Northwest Indian War, including a skirmish with the Miami Chief Little Turtle near Fort St. Clair in 1792. Popular for his service in two wars, he entered politics in 1792 as a delegate to Kentucky's constitutional convention. Adair was elected to a total of eight terms in the state House of Representatives between 1793 and 1803. He served as Speaker of the Kentucky House in 1802 and 1803, and was a delegate to the state's Second Constitutional Convention in 1799. He ascended to the United States Senate to fill the seat vacated when John Breckinridge resigned to become Attorney General of the United States in the Cabinet of Thomas Jefferson, but failed to win a full term in the subsequent election due to his implication in a treason conspiracy involving Vice President Aaron Burr. After a long legal battle, he was acquitted of any wrongdoing; and his accuser, General James Wilkinson, was ordered to issue an apology. The negative publicity kept him out of politics for more than a decade.

Adair's participation in the War of 1812, and a subsequent protracted defense of Kentucky's soldiers against General Andrew Jackson's charges that they showed cowardice at the Battle of New Orleans, restored his reputation. He returned to the State House in 1817, and Isaac Shelby, his commanding officer in the War who was serving a second term as governor, appointed him adjutant general of the state militia. In 1820, Adair was elected eighth governor on a platform of financial relief for Kentuckians hit hard by the Panic of 1819, and the ensuing economic recession. His primary effort toward this end was the creation of the Bank of the Commonwealth, but many of his other financial reforms were deemed unconstitutional by the Kentucky Court of Appeals, touching off the Old Court–New Court controversy. Following his term as governor, Adair served one undistinguished term in the United States House of Representatives and did not run for re-election.

== Early life ==
John Adair was born January 9, 1757, in Chester County in the backcountry of the Province of South Carolina, a son of Ulster immigrants Baron William of Lisburn and Mary [Moore] Adair of Ballyclare. Baron William was born in 1729 in Ulster and emigrated to Charleston in 1752, where he soon made his way to the backcountry He was educated at schools in Charlotte, North Carolina, and enlisted in the South Carolina colonial militia at the outbreak of the American Revolutionary War. He was assigned to the regiment of his friend, Edward Lacey, under the command of Colonel Thomas Sumter and participated in the failed Patriot assault on a Loyalist outpost at the Battle of Rocky Mount and the subsequent American victory at the Battle of Hanging Rock.

During the August 16, 1780, Battle of Camden, Adair was taken prisoner by the victorious British army. He contracted smallpox and was treated harshly by his captors during his months-long imprisonment. Although he escaped at one point, Adair was unable to reach safety because of difficulties related to his smallpox infection and was recaptured by British forces under Colonel Banastre Tarleton after just three days. Subsequently, he was released via a prisoner exchange. In 1781, he was commissioned as a lieutenant in the South Carolina militia, and fought in the drawn Battle of Eutaw Springs, the war's last major battle in the Carolinas.

Edward Lacey was elected sheriff of Chester County after the war, and Adair replaced him in his former capacity as the county's justice of the peace. He was chosen as a delegate to the South Carolina convention to ratify the U.S. Constitution. In 1784, Adair married Katherine Palmer. They had twelve children, ten of them daughters. One married Thomas Bell Monroe, who later served as Adair's Secretary of State and was appointed to a federal judgeship. In 1786, the Adairs migrated westward to Kentucky, settling in Mercer County. Adair was a slaveowner and slave trader.

== Service in the Northwest Indian War ==
Enlisting for service as a captain in the Northwest Indian War in 1791, Adair was soon promoted to major and assigned to the brigade of James Wilkinson. On November 6, 1792, a band of Miamis under the command of Little Turtle encountered Adair and about 100 men serving under him on a scouting mission near Fort St. Clair in Ohio. When the Miami attacked, Adair ordered Lieutenant (and later governor of Kentucky) George Madison to attack their right flank while Adair led 25 men to attack the left flank. (Adair had intended for a subordinate to lead the charge, but the officer was killed before Adair could give the order.) The maneuver forced the Miamis to fall back and allowed Adair's men to escape. They retreated to their camp and made a stand, forcing the Miamis to withdraw. Six of Adair's men were killed; another four were missing and five were wounded. Among the wounded were Madison and Richard Taylor, father of future U.S. President Zachary Taylor.

Recognizing his bravery and fighting skill, Adair's superiors promoted him to lieutenant colonel. He was assigned to the command of Charles Scott, who would eventually serve as Kentucky's fourth governor. He assisted in the construction of Fort Greeneville in 1794, forwarding supplies to Anthony Wayne during his operations which ended in a decisive victory at the Battle of Fallen Timbers.

== Early political career ==
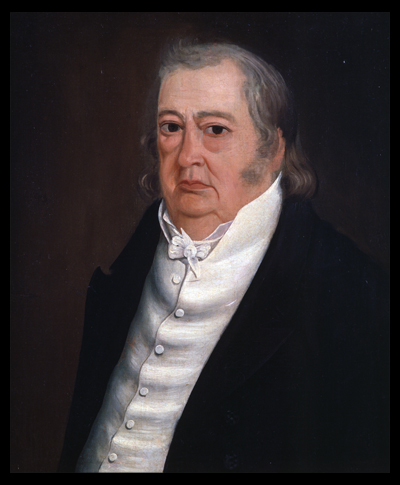
Governor James Garrard named Adair registrar of the state land office in 1804.

Popular for his military service, Adair was chosen as a delegate to the Kentucky constitutional convention in 1792. Upon the state's admission to the Union, he was elected to the Kentucky House of Representatives, serving from 1793 to 1795. He remained active in the Kentucky militia, and on February 25, 1797, he was promoted to brigadier general and given command of the 2nd Brigade of the Kentucky Militia. He was promoted to major general and given command of the 2nd Division of the Kentucky Militia on December 16, 1799.

Adair returned to the Kentucky House of Representatives in 1798. When Kentuckians voted to hold another constitutional convention in 1799 to correct weaknesses in their first constitution, Adair was chosen as a delegate. At the convention, he was the leader of a group of politically ambitious delegates who opposed most limits on the powers and terms of office of elected officials, particularly on legislators. He was elected to the Kentucky House again from 1800 to 1803. A candidate for a seat in the U.S. Senate in 1800, he was defeated in an overwhelming 68–13 vote of the legislature by John Breckinridge, who had been the acknowledged leader of the just-concluded constitutional convention. In 1802, Adair succeeded Breckinridge as Speaker of the House by a vote of 30–14 over Elder David Purviance, the candidate preferred by Governor James Garrard. He continued to serve as Speaker for the duration of his tenure in the House. In 1802, the legislature formed Adair County, Kentucky, naming it after the popular Speaker.

In January 1804, Garrard nominated Adair to the position of registrar of the state land office. Adair's was the seventh name submitted by Garrard to the state Senate for the position; his approval by the Senate marked the end of a two-month imbroglio between Garrard and the legislature over the appointment. Later that year, he was a candidate for the U.S. Senate seat then occupied by John Brown. Although Henry Clay supported Brown's re-election, Adair had the support of Felix Grundy. Grundy accused Brown of involvement in a conspiracy to make Kentucky a province of the Spanish government, damaging his popularity. Adair won a plurality, but not a majority, of the votes cast in six consecutive ballots. Clay then threw his support to Buckner Thruston, a more palatable candidate who defeated Adair on the seventh ballot. Grundy's influence in the legislature continued to grow, and when John Breckinridge resigned to accept President Thomas Jefferson's appointment as U.S. Attorney General in August 1805, the Senate chose Adair to fill the vacancy.

== Charged with disloyalty ==
Former Vice President Aaron Burr visited Kentucky in 1805, reaching Frankfort, Kentucky, on May 25 and lodging with former Senator John Brown. During the trip, he consulted with many prominent politicians, Adair among them, about the possibility of wresting Mexico from Spain. Most of those he spoke with believed he was acting on behalf of the federal government and intended to expand U.S. holdings in Mexico. Adair believed this too, having received letters from his former commander, James Wilkinson, which appeared to confirm it. In 1806, however, Burr was arrested in Frankfort on charges of treason. Officials claimed he in fact intended to create a new, independent nation in Spanish lands.

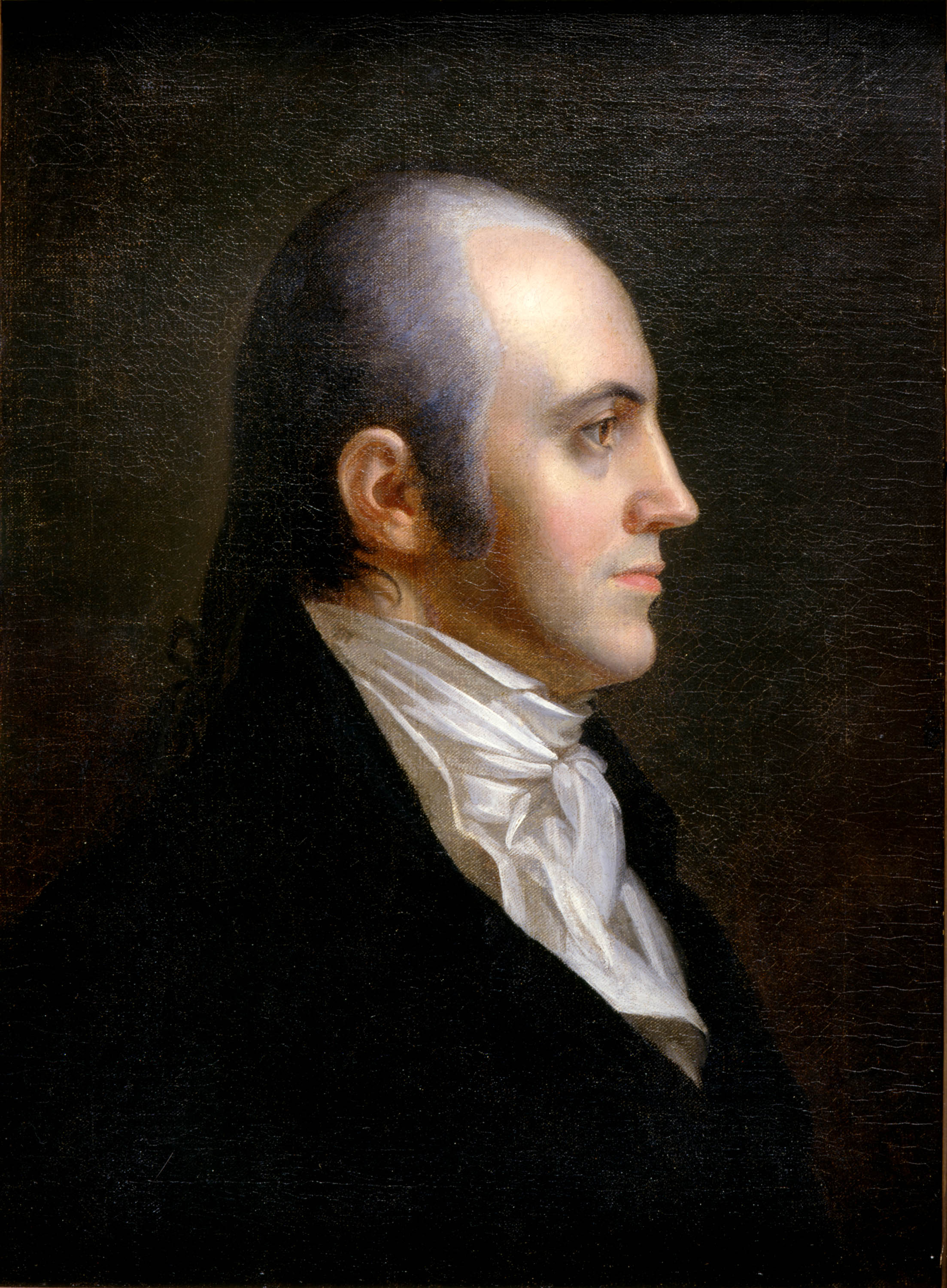
Aaron Burr and John Adair were charged with disloyalty to the U.S., but a grand jury failed to indict either of them

Convinced of his innocence, Henry Clay represented Burr, while Joseph Hamilton Daveiss acted as prosecutor. Harry Innes presided over the trial, which commenced November 11. Daveiss had to ask for a postponement because Davis Floyd, one of his key witnesses, was then serving in the Indiana General Assembly and could not be present in court. The court next convened on December 2, and Daveiss again had to ask for a postponement, this time because Adair, another witness, was not present. Adair had traveled to Louisiana to inspect a tract of land he had recently purchased there. On his arrival in New Orleans, he was arrested on the order of his former commander, James Wilkinson, then serving as governor of the Louisiana Territory.

Clay had insisted that the trial proceed in Adair's absence, and, the next day, Daveiss presented indictments against Burr for treason and against Adair as a co-conspirator. After hearing testimony, the grand jury rejected the indictment against Adair as "not a true bill" and similarly dismissed the charges against Burr two days later. After his vindication by the grand jury, Adair counter-sued Wilkinson in federal court. Although the legal battle between the two spanned several years, the court found that Wilkinson had no solid evidence against Adair and ordered Wilkinson to issue a public apology and pay Adair $2,500 in damages. Adair's acquittal and successful counter-suit came too late to prevent damage to his political career. Because of his association with Burr's scheme, he lost the election for a full term in the Senate in November 1806. Rather than wait for his partial term to expire, he resigned on November 18, 1806.

== Service in the War of 1812 ==
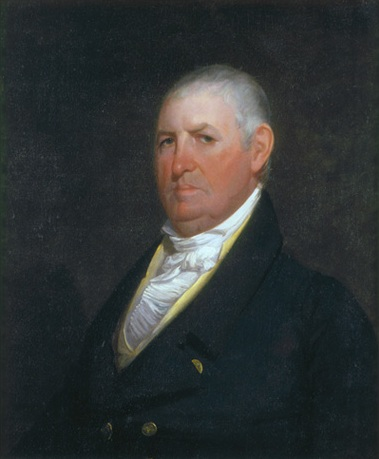
Isaac Shelby appointed Adair adjutant general of Kentucky

Adair rejoined the Kentucky militia at the outset of the War of 1812. After Oliver Hazard Perry's victory in the September 10, 1813, Battle of Lake Erie, William Henry Harrison called on Kentucky Governor Isaac Shelby, a popular Revolutionary War hero, to recruit troops in Kentucky and join him in his invasion of Canada. Shelby asked Adair to serve as his first aide-de-camp. Future Kentucky governor and U.S. Senator John J. Crittenden was Shelby's second aide, and future U.S. Senator and Postmaster General William T. Barry was his secretary. Adair rendered commendable service in the campaign, most notably at the American victory in the Battle of the Thames on October 5, 1813. Shelby praised Adair's service and in 1814, made him adjutant general of Kentucky and brevetted him to the rank of brigadier general.

In late 1814, Andrew Jackson requested reinforcements from Kentucky for his defense of the Gulf of Mexico. Adair quickly raised three regiments, but the federal government provided them no weapons and no means of transportation. James Taylor, Jr., then serving as quartermaster general of the state militia, took out a $6,000 mortgage on his personal land to purchase boats to transport Adair's men. The number of men with Adair was later disputed; sources variously give numbers between 700 and 1,500. Many did not have weapons, and the ones who did were primarily armed with their own civilian rifles. John Thomas, to whom Adair was an adjunct, fell ill just before the battle commenced, leaving Adair responsible for all the Kentuckians present at the battle.

On January 7, 1815, Adair traveled to New Orleans and requested that the city's leaders lend him several stands of arms from the city armory to arm his militiamen. The officials agreed under the condition that the removal of the arms from the armory be kept secret from the citizenry. The weapons were placed in boxes and delivered to Adair's camp on the night of January 7. At Adair's suggestion, his men were placed in reserve and located centrally behind the Tennessee militiamen under William Carroll. From there, they could quickly move to reinforce whichever portion of the American line received the heaviest attack from the British.

Apparently unaware of Adair's request, that evening, Jackson ordered 400 unarmed Kentucky militiamen under Colonel John Davis to march to New Orleans to obtain arms, then reinforce the 450 Louisiana militiamen under David B. Morgan on the west bank of the Mississippi River. When they arrived in New Orleans, they were told that the city's arms had already been shipped to Adair. The citizens collected what weapons they had —mostly old muskets in various states of disrepair —and gave them to Davis' men. About 200 men were thus armed and reported to Morgan as ordered, just hours before the start of the Battle of New Orleans. The remainder of Davis's men returned to the main camp, still without weapons.

As the British approached on the morning of January 8, it became evident that they would try to break the American line through Carroll's Tennesseans, and Adair advanced his men to support them. The main American line held and repulsed the British attack; in total, only six Americans were killed and seven wounded. Meanwhile, Davis' Kentuckians on the west bank had, upon their arrival in Morgan's camp, been sent to meet the advance of a secondary British force. Outnumbered, poorly armed, and without the benefit of breastworks or artillery support, they were quickly outflanked and forced to retreat. Seeing the retreat of the Kentuckians, Morgan's militiamen abandoned their breastworks; Adair would later claim they had never even fired a shot. The British quickly abandoned the position they had just captured, but Jackson resented the setback in an otherwise spectacular victory.

== Controversy with Andrew Jackson ==
Jackson's official report blamed the Kentuckians' retreat for the collapse of the west bank defenses, and many Kentuckians felt it played down the importance of Adair's militiamen on the east bank in preserving the American line and securing the victory. Davis' men insisted the report was based on Jackson's misunderstanding of the facts and asked that Adair request a court of inquiry, which convened in February 1815 with Major General Carroll of Tennessee presiding. The court's report found that "[t]he retreat of the Kentucky militia, which, considering their position, the deficiency of their arms, and other causes, may be excusable," and that the formation of the troops on the west bank was "exceptional", noting that 500 Louisiana troops supported by three artillery pieces and protected by a strong breastwork were charged with defending a line that stretched only 200 yards (180 m) while Davis's 170 Kentuckians, poorly armed and protected only by a small ditch, were expected to defend a line over 300 yards (270 m) long. On February 10, 1816, the Kentucky General Assembly passed a resolution thanking Adair for his service at the Battle of New Orleans and for his defense of the soldiers accused by Jackson.

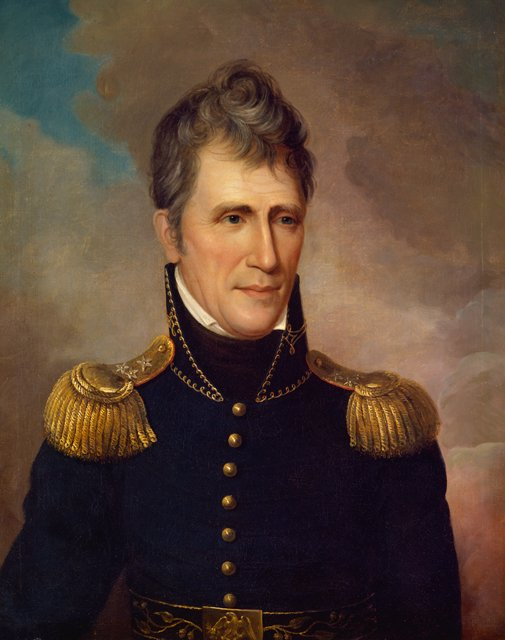
Andrew Jackson and Adair engaged in a public dispute over the conduct of the Kentucky militiamen at the Battle of New Orleans

Jackson approved the court's findings, but they were not the full refutation of Jackson's report that many Kentuckians —including Adair —had wanted. In a letter that was quickly made public, Adair —formerly one of Jackson's close friends —insisted that Jackson withdraw or modify his official report, but Jackson refused. This ended the matter until June 1815 when H. P. Helm, secretary to John Thomas, forwarded to a Frankfort newspaper remarks from "the general" that had been annexed to the official report. "The remarks" stated that the general was now convinced that the initial reports of cowardice by Davis's men "had been misrepresented" and that their retreat had been "not only excusable, but absolutely justifiable." The remarks, popularly believed to be from Jackson in response to Adair's letter, were subsequently reprinted across Kentucky. The "general" referenced was in fact General John Thomas; Jackson had never seen them. Helm claimed he sent a subsequent correction to the newspaper that published the remarks, but it was never printed.

Jackson did not discover the remarks until they were published again in January 1817 in response to a Boston newspaper's criticism of Kentucky militiamen. He wrote to the Kentucky Reporter at that time, denouncing the remarks as a forgery. The Reporter investigated and published an explanation of how Thomas's remarks had been attributed to Jackson. They did not reprint Jackson's letter because they felt his claim that the remarks had been intentionally forged —a charge which was now found to be false —was too inflammatory. The editors promised that if their retraction did not satisfy Jackson, they would fully publish any of his additional remarks on the subject. In Jackson's April 1817 response, he implied that Adair had intentionally misrepresented the remarks, and reasserted that they had been forged, possibly by Adair himself. Adair believed Jackson's references to the remarks as a "forged dish, dressed in the true Spanish style" was a thinly veiled reference to Adair's alleged participation in the Burr conspiracy. As ostensible proof that he was not predisposed against Kentuckians, Jackson also implied that he had not reported additional dishonorable behavior by Kentucky militiamen during the battle. This letter thrust the dispute into the national spotlight and prompted Adair to resume correspondence with him both to defend Davis's men and refute Jackson's charges of conspiracy. In his May 1817 response, he reasserted his defense of the Kentucky militiamen at New Orleans and dismissed many of Jackson's allegations as unimportant and untrue. He flatly denied the existence of a conspiracy, and chastised Jackson for making charges without supporting evidence. Responding to Jackson's allusion to Spain, Adair recalled that Jackson had also been implicated with Burr.

Unable to provide tangible evidence of Adair's alleged misdeeds, Jackson provided indirect evidence that a conspiracy was possible. His response, delayed by his treaty negotiations with the Cherokee, was printed September 3, 1817, and used complicated calculations based on spacing and distance, to argue that Adair had only half the number of men he claimed to have commanded at the Battle of New Orleans. Further, he claimed that Adair had ordered Davis to New Orleans to obtain weapons knowing that the arms had already been taken by other brigades under Adair's command. Either Adair had given a foolish order, or he did not have as many men in his main force as he claimed. He closed by promising that this would be his last statement on the matter. Adair's October 29, 1817, response was delayed, he said, because he was awaiting documents from New Orleans that never came. In it, he quoted from a letter to Jackson's aide-de-camp —cited by Jackson himself in previous correspondence —showing that Jackson had been made aware of both the existence and the authorship of Thomas's remarks in 1815 but declined the opportunity to refute them. He also defended his account of the number of troops under his command, which he had consistently reported as being near 1,000, and asked why Jackson had not challenged it until now. Finally, he claimed that not only did he retrieve the weapons from New Orleans under Jackson's orders, but he rode Jackson's horse to New Orleans to effect the transaction. Tradition holds that this letter prompted either Adair or Jackson to challenge the other to a duel, but friends of both men averted the conflict after assembling to watch; no written evidence of the event exists. (Note: Historian Zachariah Frederick Smith gives a detailed account of this tradition that he claims was told to him by a descendant of Adair's cousin. See Smith, pp. 113–114) Tensions between the two eventually eased, and Adair came to comfort Jackson after his wife Rachel's death in 1828. Adair also campaigned for Jackson during his presidential campaigns in 1824, 1828, and 1832. Jackson's opponents compiled copies of his letters into campaign pamphlets to use against him in Kentucky during these elections.

== Governor of Kentucky ==
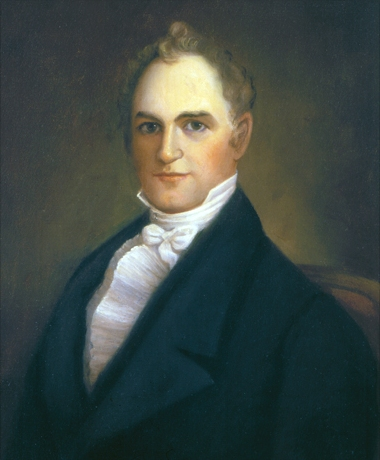
Joseph Desha, one of Adair's opponents in the gubernatorial election of 1820

Adair's participation in the War of 1812 and subsequent correspondence with Jackson restored his reputation. He continued to serve as adjutant general until 1817, when the voters returned him to the state House of Representatives. He was nominated for Speaker of the House during that term, and, although he was not elected, he drew support from members of both parties, largely because of his correspondence with Jackson.

In the aftermath of the Panic of 1819 —the first major financial crisis in United States history —the primary political issue of the day was debt relief. The federal government had created the Second Bank of the United States in 1817, and its strict credit policy hit Kentucky's large debtor class hard. Sitting governor Gabriel Slaughter had lobbied for some measures favored by the state's debtors, particularly punitive taxes against the branches of the Bank of the United States in Louisville and Lexington. The Second Party System had not yet developed, but there were nonetheless two opposing factions that arose around the debt relief issue. The first —primarily composed of land speculators who had bought large land parcels on credit and were unable to repay their debts due to the financial crisis —was dubbed the Relief Party (or "faction") and favored more legislation favorable to debtors. Opposed to them was the Anti-Relief Party; it was composed primarily of the state's aristocracy, many of whom were creditors to the land speculators and demanded that their contracts be adhered to without interference from the government. They claimed that no government intervention could effectively aid the debtors and that attempts to do so would only prolong the economic depression.

Adair was the clear leader of the Relief faction, and his popularity had been enhanced thanks to his lengthy and public dispute with Jackson. In the 1820 gubernatorial election, he was elected as Kentucky's chief executive over three fellow Democratic-Republicans. Adair garnered 20,493 votes; U.S. Senator William Logan finished second with 19,497, fellow veteran Joseph Desha received 12,419, and Colonel Anthony Butler mustered only 9,567 votes. Proponents of debt relief measures also won majorities in both houses of the General Assembly.

=== Debt relief ===
Kentucky historian Lowell H. Harrison opined that the most important measure implemented during Adair's administration was the creation of the Bank of the Commonwealth in 1820. The bank made generous loans and liberally issued paper money. Although bank notes issued by the Bank of the Commonwealth quickly fell well below par, creditors who refused to accept these devalued notes had to wait two years before seeking replevin. To inspire confidence in the devalued notes, Adair mandated that all officers of the state receive their salaries in notes issued by the Bank of the Commonwealth.

The state's other bank, the Bank of Kentucky, adhered to more conservative banking practices. While this held the value of its notes closer to par, it also rendered loans less available, which angered relief-minded legislators; consequently, they revoked the bank's charter in December 1822. Adair oversaw the abolition of the practice of incarceration for debt, and sanctioned rigorous anti-gambling legislation. Legislators also exempted from forced sale the items then considered necessary for making a living —a horse, a plow, a hoe, and an ax.

The Kentucky Court of Appeals, then the state's court of last resort, struck down the law ordering a two-year stay of replevin because it impaired the obligation of contracts. At about the same time, the U.S. Supreme Court issued its decision in the case of Green v. Biddle, holding that land claims granted by Virginia in the District of Kentucky before Kentucky became a separate state took precedence over those later granted by the state of Kentucky if the two were in conflict. Adair denounced this decision in an 1823 message to the legislature, warning against federal and judicial interference in the will of the people, expressed through the legislature. Emboldened by Adair's message, Relief partisans sought to remove the three justices of the state Court of Appeals, as well as James Clark, a lower court judge who had issued a similar ruling, from the bench. The judges were spared when their opponents failed to obtain the two-thirds majority required for removal.

=== Other matters of Adair's term ===
Adair urged legislators to create a public school system. In response, the General Assembly passed an act creating a state "Literary Fund" which received half of the clear profits accrued by the Bank of the Commonwealth. The fund was to be available, proportionally, to each of the state's counties for the establishment of "a system of general education". In the tumultuous economic environment, however, legislators routinely voted to borrow from the Literary Fund to pay for other priorities, chiefly the construction of internal improvements.

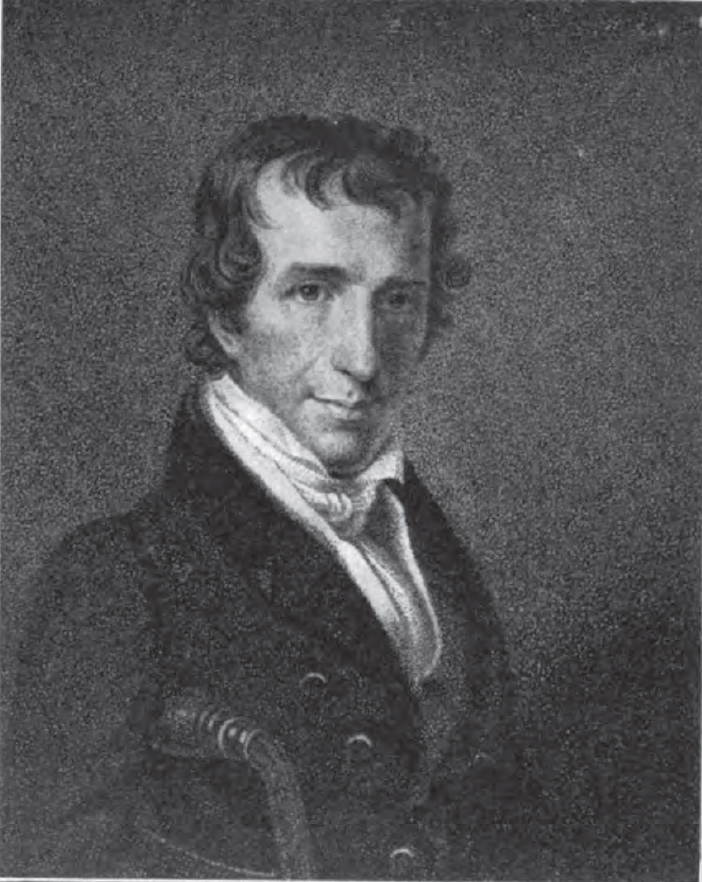
William T. Barry, Adair's lieutenant governor

Adair's lieutenant governor, William T. Barry, and John Pope, Secretary of State under Adair's predecessor, headed a six-man committee authorized by the act to study the creation of a system of common schools. The "Barry Report," delivered to the legislature in December 1822, was lauded by statesmen including John Adams, Thomas Jefferson, and James Madison. Authored by committee member Amos Kendall, it criticized the idea of land grant academies then prevalent in the state as unworkable outside affluent towns. It also concluded that the Literary Fund alone was insufficient for funding a system of common schools. The report recommended that funds only be made available to counties that imposed a county tax for the benefit of the public school system. Legislators largely ignored the report, a decision Kentucky historian Thomas D. Clark called "one of the most egregious blunders in American educational history".

Adair's endorsement of the Missouri Compromise was instrumental in securing its passage by Kentucky legislators. He advocated prison reform and better treatment of the insane. He also oversaw the enactment of a plan for internal improvements, including improved navigation on the Ohio River.

== Later life ==
Barred from seeking immediate re-election by the state constitution, Adair retired to his farm in Mercer County at the expiration of his term as governor. Shortly after returning to private life, he began to complain about the low value of Bank of the Commonwealth notes —then worth about half par —and petitioned the legislature to remedy the situation. The complaint of a former Relief Party governor over the ill effects of pro-relief legislation prompted wry celebration among members of the Anti-Relief faction.

Adair made one final contribution to the public when he was elected to the U.S. House of Representatives as a Jackson Democrat in 1831. During the 22nd Congress, he served on the Committee on Military Affairs. During his term, he made only one speech, and it was so inaudible that no one knew what position he was advocating. The House reporter speculated that it concerned mounting Federal troops on horseback. He did not run for re-election in 1833, and left public life for good.

== Death and legacy ==
He died at home in Harrodsburg on May 19, 1840, and was buried on the grounds of his estate, White Hall. In 1872, his remains were moved to the Frankfort Cemetery, by the state capitol, and the Commonwealth erected a marker over his grave there.

In addition to Adair County in Kentucky, Adair County, Missouri, Adair County, Iowa, and the towns of Adairville, Kentucky, and Adair, Iowa, were named in his honor.

== Notes ==
U.S. Senate
Preceded by John Breckinridge	U.S. senator (Class 3) from Kentucky; 1805–1806; Served alongside: Buckner Thruston	Succeeded by Henry Clay
Political offices
Preceded by Gabriel Slaughter	Governor of Kentucky; 1820–24	Succeeded by Joseph Desha
U.S. House of Representatives
Preceded by John Kincaid	Member of the U.S. House of Representatives from Kentucky's 7th congressional district 1831–1833	Succeeded by Benjamin Hardin
