= Payne-Desha House =

Historic house in Georgetown, KY, US

- U.S. National Register of Historic Places
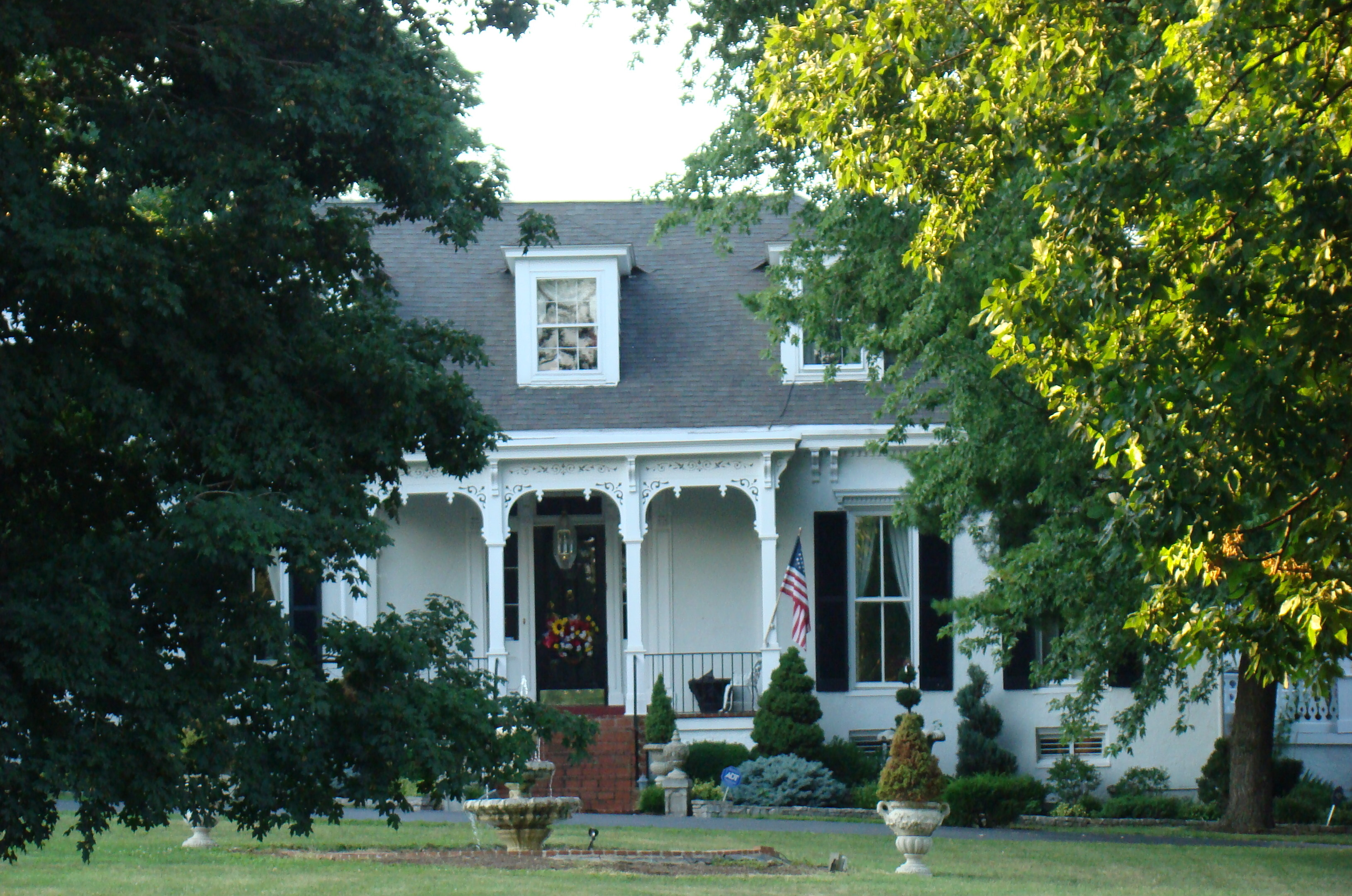

- Location within Kentucky Location within the United States
- Coordinates: 38°12′45″N 84°33′48″W
- Built: 1814
- Architectural style: Federal
- NRHP reference No.: 74000902
- Added to NRHP: December 2, 1974

The Payne-Desha House is a historic house located on land west of Royal Spring Branch near downtown Georgetown, Kentucky, USA. It was built in 1814 by Robert Payne, a Kentucky war hero from the Battle of the Thames. It was the last residence of Joseph Desha, the ninth governor of Kentucky.

The property was added to the U.S. National Register of Historic Places on December 2, 1974.

== History ==
In 1784, Elijah Craig established the town of Lebanon, Virginia near McClelland's Station, an abandoned army fort. The name was changed to George Town in 1790 as a tribute to the first President of the United States, George Washington. The town was centered around Royal Spring, a large spring that was reliable source of water for the residents and industry in the area.

The Payne-Desha House was built on the west side of Royal Spring Branch on land originally owned by Elijah Craig. After Craig's death in 1808, General Richard Gano and Josiah Pitts purchased the property near Royal Spring Branch from Craig's estate. In 1814 General John Payne bought both pieces of land, making a 20-acre (81,000 m^{2}) estate. Payne's son Robert and daughter-in-law Maria (Williams) built a large stone house on the property. Financial circumstances forced the sale of the estate in 1821 and Benjamen Smith bought the property.

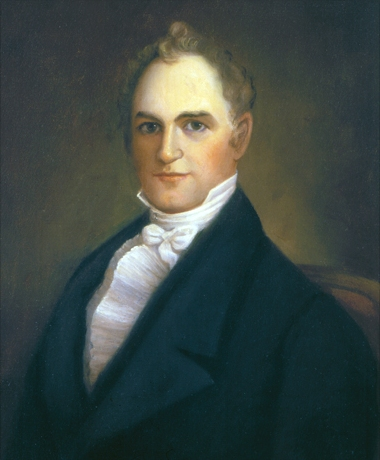
Joseph Desha

During the later years of his life, former Kentucky Governor Joseph Desha and his wife Margaret relocated to Georgetown. The couple first resided on East Main Street, then in 1841 moved to the property along Royal Spring Branch. Desha lived in the Payne-Desha House until his death on October 11, 1842.

James Y. Kelly owned the property in the later part of the 19th century when extensive changes were made to the exterior of the house. Another longtime resident of the house was James R. Hamilton, who remodeled the structure in 1955 and 1975.

== Architecture ==
Originally, the Payne-Desha House was built in the Federal style. In the late 19th century it was updated to the then popular Italianate style. Additionally, the house underwent renovations in 1955 and 1975.

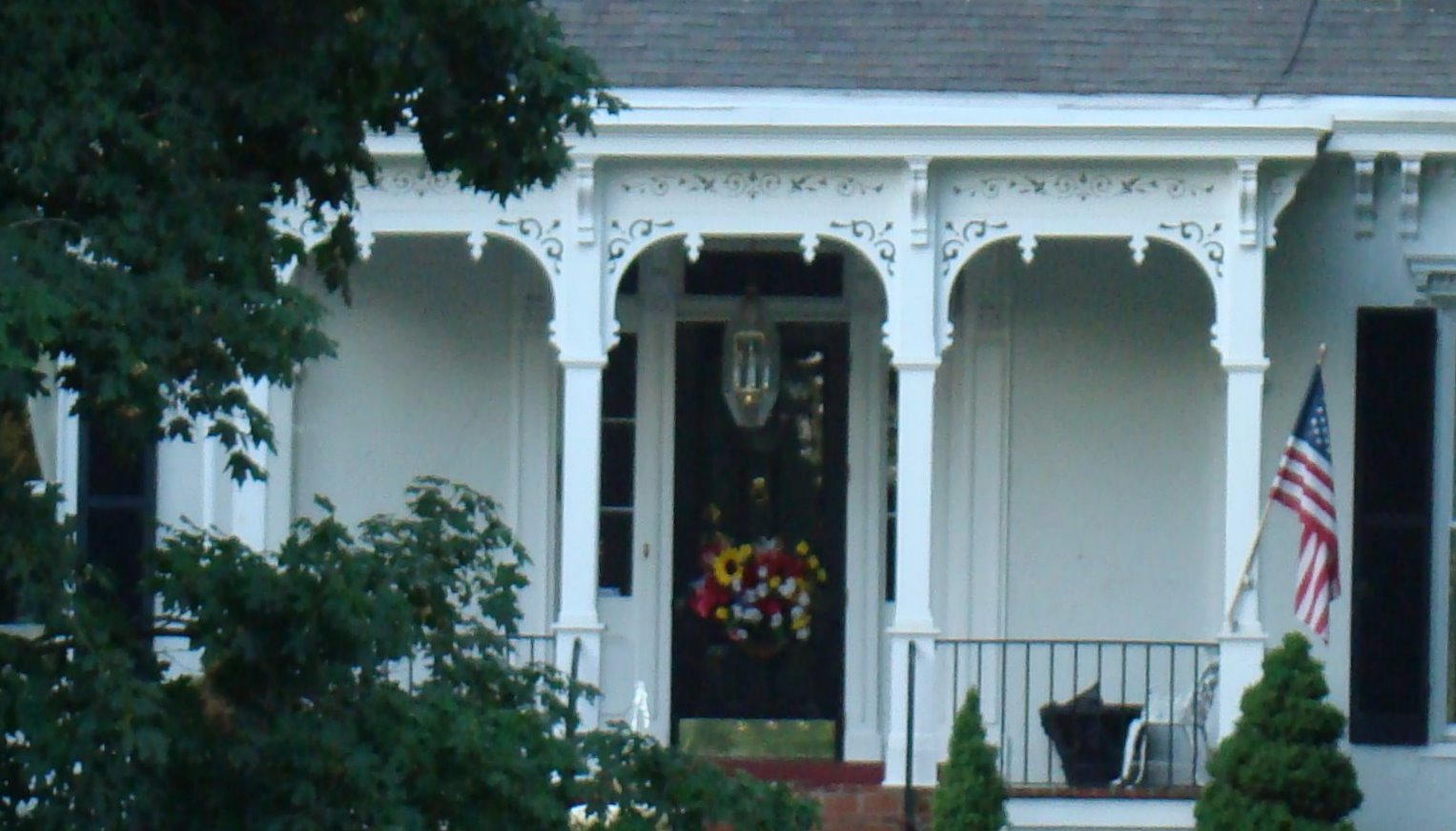
Details of Italianate style porch addition

As first built, the house featured "an arch spanned central hall, a winding staircase, ash floors, sunburst design mantels, beaded and fluted woodwork, three basements, and a hipped roof", making it one of the most intricate early stone structures in Scott County, Kentucky.

The exterior of the house was altered in the late 19th century with the addition of Italianate style porches, hood moulds, and roof brackets.
