= Gabriel Slaughter =

American politician, seventh Governor of Kentucky

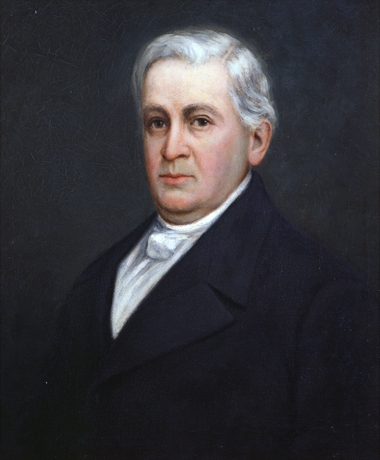
- Posthumous portrait, 1908

7th Governor of Kentucky
- In office October 14, 1816 – August 29, 1820
- Lieutenant: Vacant
- Preceded by: George Madison
- Succeeded by: John Adair

4th and 6th Lieutenant Governor of Kentucky
- In office September 5, 1816 – October 14, 1816
- Governor: George Madison
- Preceded by: Richard Hickman
- Succeeded by: William T. Barry
- In office December 1808 – August 24, 1812
- Governor: Charles Scott
- Preceded by: Thomas Posey
- Succeeded by: Richard Hickman

Member of the Kentucky Senate
- In office 1801-1808

Member of the Kentucky House of Representatives
- In office 1797-1801

Personal details
- Born: December 12, 1767 Culpeper County, Colony of Virginia, British America
- Died: September 19, 1830 (aged 62) Mercer County, Kentucky, U.S.
- Party: Democratic-Republican
- Spouse(s): Sarah Slaughter; Sara Hord; Elizabeth Rodes
- Profession: Soldier, Farmer

Military service
- Branch/service: Kentucky militia
- Rank: Colonel
- Battles/wars: War of 1812

Gabriel Slaughter (December 12, 1767 – September 19, 1830) was the seventh governor of Kentucky and was the first person to ascend to that office upon the death of the sitting governor. His family moved to Kentucky from Virginia when he was very young. He became a member of the Kentucky militia, serving throughout his political career. He received a citation from the state legislature in recognition of his service at the Battle of New Orleans.

After spending a decade in the state legislature, Slaughter was elected the fourth lieutenant governor of Kentucky, serving under Charles Scott. With the War of 1812 looming at the end of his tenure, Slaughter ran for governor against Isaac Shelby, the state's first governor and a noted military leader. Shelby beat Slaughter soundly. Four years later, Slaughter was again elected as the sixth lieutenant governor, serving under George Madison.

Madison died a short time into his term, whereupon Slaughter became acting governor. He sought to be sworn in as governor, but public sentiment turned against him when he replaced Shelby's son-in-law with John Pope as Secretary of State. Pope was an unpopular figure in Kentucky and, after his appointment, some in the General Assembly began to call for a special election to replace Slaughter. The measure did not pass, but Slaughter was never able to shed the title of "acting governor." Following his term as governor, Slaughter became a Baptist lay minister and served on the first board of trustees of Georgetown College. He died September 19, 1830, and was buried in his family's cemetery.

== Early life ==
Gabriel Slaughter was born in Culpeper County in the Colony of Virginia on December 12, 1767, the son of Robert and Susannah (Harrison) Slaughter. He was educated in the county's public schools and worked as a farmer. In 1786, Slaughter married a cousin, Sarah Slaughter, and the couple had two daughters – Mary Buckner Slaughter and Susan Harrison Slaughter.

Slaughter's father visited Kentucky as early as 1776, and moved to Mercer County permanently in 1789. In September 1791, Gabriel Slaughter sold his land in Virginia, and he and his family followed his father to Kentucky. He became known for his generosity, and his large mansion on the turnpike to Lexington was nicknamed "Wayfarer's Rest" because of the vast number of travelers that he allowed to stay there. Among his guests was future lieutenant governor Robert B. McAfee. Soon after his arrival in Kentucky, however, his wife Sarah died, leaving Slaughter to care for his two daughters alone.

In 1795, Slaughter was appointed justice of the peace in Mercer County by Governor Isaac Shelby. The same year, he was also named a tax commissioner for a district of Mercer County. On a return trip to Virginia in 1797, Slaughter married his second wife, Sara Hord. The couple returned to Slaughter's home in Mercer County, where they had three children: John Hord Slaughter, Frances Ann Hord Slaughter, and Felix Grundy Slaughter.

== Service in the Kentucky General Assembly ==
Slaughter's political career began in earnest with his 1797 election to the Kentucky House of Representatives representing Mercer County. He was named to the Committee on Enrollments, and probably served as chair, since he delivered the committee's reports to the Assembly. It is unclear whether he did not seek re-election in 1798, or whether he was defeated in that year's canvass. Whatever the case, he filled the space of his legislative hiatus by serving as trustee of the newly incorporated Harrodsburg Academy. He was re-elected to the state House in 1799. In addition to the Committee on Enrollments, he served on the Committee on Privileges and Elections and a joint committee that reported on the state of the Auditor's, Treasurer's, and Registrar's offices. Records show that he also served as chairman when the House sat as a committee of the whole on November 25, 1799.

Slaughter was re-elected to the state House in 1800, and from 1801 to 1808 he served in the Kentucky Senate. In 1801, he was chosen as one of three commissioners from Mercer County charged with selling stock shares in the Kentucky River Company, which was chartered to clear obstructions in the Kentucky River from its mouth to the mouth of its south fork. In 1804, he was a candidate for President Pro Tempore of the Kentucky Senate following the death of the Senate's presiding officer, Lieutenant Governor John Caldwell. Ultimately, however, Thomas Posey proved the more popular choice. From 1807 to 1808, he served as chair of the Senate Committee of Propositions and Grievances.

Slaughter was elected lieutenant governor in 1808. He was supported by Abraham Childers during the campaign. In a four-man race, Slaughter received more than three times the number of votes as his nearest opponent. His four-year term under Governor Charles Scott was largely undistinguished. Although the exact date is unknown, it is likely that the death of Slaughter's second wife preceded his election as lieutenant governor. On October 3, 1811, he married his third wife, Elizabeth (Thompson) Rodes, a widow from Scott County.

Prohibited by the Kentucky Constitution from succeeding himself as lieutenant governor, Slaughter ran for governor of Kentucky in 1812. The impending war with England, however, drew military hero and former governor Isaac Shelby into the race. Despite Shelby's immense popularity, Slaughter refused to withdraw from the race and was soundly beaten by more than a two-to-one margin. Following his defeat, Slaughter took a two-year hiatus from public life, and engaged in farming at his estate in Mercer County.

== Service in the state militia ==
Slaughter had been commissioned as a lieutenant colonel in the Fifth Regiment of the Kentucky militia on December 24, 1803. He was promoted to the rank of major in 1802 and colonel in 1803. In 1814, he answered Governor Shelby's call for volunteers to serve in the army of the Southwest under General Andrew Jackson.

When the Quartermaster general did not deliver promised supplies to Slaughter's regiment, private funds had to be used to purchase boats for their travel down the Mississippi River. They also ran short of weapons. Upon their arrival at New Orleans on January 4, 1815, General Jackson noted in his official report that "Not one man in ten was well armed, and only one man in three had any arms at all." The citizens of New Orleans provided enough firearms to equip the rest of Slaughter's men and another Kentucky battalion. Slaughter commanded 526 men. Despite being vastly outnumbered, Jackson's forces were victorious. Units from Kentucky and Tennessee, including Slaughter's regiment, bore the brunt of the British attack. Slaughter's troops were in reserve, behind the rest of Major General William Carroll's troops on the left wing Slaughter was later recognized by the state legislature for his service.

Following their service together, Jackson asked Slaughter to preside over a court martial. When the verdict was not satisfactory to Jackson, he ordered Slaughter to reconsider and reverse the decision. Slaughter declined, replying "I know my duty, and have performed it." This decision was respected by Jackson, and apparently did no harm to the mutual respect between him and Slaughter.

== Ascension to the governorship ==
In 1816, Slaughter was again elected to the post of lieutenant governor over Richard Hickman and James Garrard Jr. George Madison was elected governor without opposition. Madison died October 14, 1816, and Slaughter ascended to the governorship. This was the first time a sitting governor had died in office in Kentucky, and some questioned the legality of Slaughter's status in the position.

Following Governor Madison's death, Secretary of State Charles Stewart Todd offered to step down if Slaughter preferred to appoint someone else to the post. The letter was not an explicit resignation, as Todd emphatically declared his intention to work with Slaughter should the governor choose to retain him. Slaughter did replace Todd with former Senator John Pope, however, apparently as a political favor. This move proved disastrous for Slaughter's political career. Todd was very popular by virtue of being the son-in-law of twice-governor Shelby. By contrast, Pope was extremely unpopular for his vote in the U.S. Senate against declaring war in the War of 1812.

The move was panned in the state's newspapers, and by prominent citizens such as future governor James Turner Morehead. Yet Slaughter followed up with another unpopular decision, appointing Martin D. Hardin, a member of the hated Federalist Party, to fill the Senate seat of William T. Barry. Despite this, the General Assembly made the appointment permanent when it convened in December 1816. However, the administration candidate for a full senatorial term, John Adair was defeated in the General Assembly, which opted for John J. Crittenden.

On January 27, 1817, a faction in the Kentucky House of Representatives led by Joseph Cabell Breckinridge proposed a bill calling for the election of "a governor to fill the vacancy occasioned by the death of" Governor Madison. The measure failed, but the legislative elections of 1817 showed a popular mandate for a special gubernatorial election. The Kentucky House passed a bill calling for such elections by a vote of 56–30, but the measure died in the state senate. Nevertheless, Slaughter was never officially given the title of governor and was referred to as "lieutenant governor" or "acting governor" throughout his administration. The General Assembly censured both Slaughter and Pope for failing to require the proper security and oath of office for the state treasurer.

Slaughter's unpopularity led to the demise of many of his proposals, regardless of their merits. He suggested a comprehensive system of public schools and, though the idea had been proposed by previous governors, Slaughter devised a means of funding it. The hostile legislature refused the plan and overrode Slaughter's vetoes of bills that allowed individual schools to be supported by lotteries. Slaughter further proposed a reform of the penal system and recommended internal improvements, including the creation of a state library. These measures were also rejected.

Slaughter's governorship was further complicated by the financial panic of 1819, and he spent the majority of his term working to stabilize that state's economy. Politicians of the day generally divided into those who favored measures favorable to debtors – called the "relief" position or party – and those who insisted that creditors be paid in a timely manner – called the "anti-relief" position or party. On December 16, 1819, the General Assembly passed a law requiring a six-month moratorium on the collection of debts. Slaughter, an anti-relief partisan, vetoed the bill, but relief party legislators held a large majority in the General Assembly thanks to the previous fall's elections, and overrode the veto. The following February, the General Assembly passed an even more liberal stay law, preventing the collection of debts for one year if the creditor would accept payments in the devalued notes of the Bank of Kentucky and two years if they demanded payment in specie or specie-backed notes. These actions were a precursor to the Old Court-New Court controversy. While Slaughter clashed with the General Assembly over potential solutions to the crisis at the state level, he adopted a strong states' rights policy at the national level. He challenged the constitutionality of the Bank of the United States and the Supreme Court's ruling that individual states could not tax branches of the Bank.

== Religious leadership and later life ==
Following his term as governor, Slaughter failed in a bid to return to the state senate in 1821, but was re-elected to the state House of Representatives in 1823, serving a single term. During this term, he continued to support measures to improve education. He voted to ask Congress for aid for the Deaf and Dumb School in the state, and opposed redirecting fines and forfeitures earmarked for the state's "Seminaries of Learning" into the state treasury. He was also named to a joint committee to investigate the use of state appropriations to Transylvania University.

Concurrent with his political career, Slaughter took a leading role in the affairs of his church. He was born into the tradition of the Church of England, but soon became associated with the Baptist congregation at Shawnee Run. He served as a messenger from this congregation to the various associations with which it was connected for over thirty years. One such association was the South District Association; Slaughter served as clerk at that body's annual meeting in 1808 and 1809, and later served as its moderator for nine years. In 1813, he helped found the Kentucky Bible Society.

Following his term in the state House, Slaughter retired from politics and became an active lay minister of the Baptist faith. In 1829, he was appointed to the first board of trustees of Georgetown College, a Baptist college in Georgetown, Kentucky. He died on September 19, 1830, and was interred in his family's cemetery in Mercer County.

Political offices
Preceded by George Madison	Governor of Kentucky; 1816–1820	Succeeded by John Adair
Preceded by Thomas Posey	Lieutenant Governor of Kentucky; 1808–1812	Succeeded by Richard Hickman
Preceded by Richard Hickman	Lieutenant Governor of Kentucky; 1816	Succeeded by William T. Barry
