= Old Court – New Court controversy =

19th-century political controversy in Kentucky

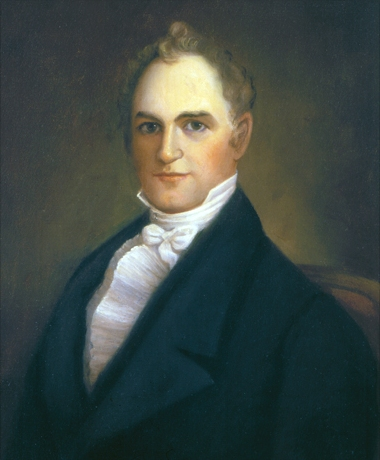
The Old Court – New Court controversy dominated the term of Kentucky Governor Joseph Desha

The Old Court – New Court controversy (sometimes known as the Kentucky Relief War) was a 19th-century political controversy in the U.S. state of Kentucky in which the Kentucky General Assembly abolished the Kentucky Court of Appeals and replaced it with a new court. The justices of the old court refused to recognize the action as valid, and for a time, two separate courts operated as the court of last resort for the state.

The controversy began when the financial Panic of 1819 left many Kentuckians in debt and unable to meet their financial obligations. A debt relief movement began in the state, and pro-relief candidates won majorities in the General Assembly in 1820. The Assembly passed a law of replevin that was extremely favorable to debtors. Disgruntled creditors challenged the constitutionality of the law, appealing their case to the Court of Appeals. The court opined in favor of the creditors. Attempts to remove the anti-relief justices failed. The pro-relief legislature passed a measure abolishing the Court of Appeals and replacing it with a new court, to which pro-relief governor Joseph Desha appointed pro-relief justices who upheld the replevin law.

As the economic situation in the state improved in the second half of the 1820s, the Old Court supporters regained control of both houses of the General Assembly. They abolished the New Court and restored the Old Court to power. In an 1829 case, the Court nullified decisions rendered by the New Court. In a 1935 case, the Court struck all the New Court cases from Kentucky common law.

== Background ==
A period of national prosperity followed the end of the War of 1812. In Kentucky, rapid population growth and strong demand for the state's goods led to land speculation becoming a popular enterprise. The charter of the Kentucky Insurance Company in 1802 and the Bank of Kentucky in 1806 made currency for loans plentiful. The establishment of branches of the Second Bank of the United States in Louisville and Lexington further augmented the availability of credit. In 1818, the General Assembly chartered 40 more state banks, and later added six more.

In late 1818, however, demand for U.S. goods fell sharply in Europe. Land values also began to fall, touching off the Panic of 1819. Many persons in the state were unable to repay their loans. A struggle began between creditors seeking to collect money owed to them and debtors seeking relief from obligations they could not meet. A Debt Relief Party sprang up in the state, which had long been a single-party bastion.

In 1819, Governor Gabriel Slaughter agreed to repeal the charters of the 46 banks—now known as "The Forty Thieves" —established by the General Assembly. He concurred when the General Assembly abolished damages on disputed bills of exchange.

== Beginning of the controversy ==
In 1820, the Debt Relief Party gained majorities in both houses of the General Assembly. On February 11, 1820, the Assembly passed a law of replevin, or "stay law," that prevented creditors from seeking court order for payment of a debt for a period of one year. They hoped that this would provide time for an economic recovery which would allow debtors to save their investments. If the creditor would not accept bank notes issued by the Bank of Kentucky, he was forced to wait an additional year to collect the debt.

On November 29, 1820, the Assembly chartered the Bank of the Commonwealth, another source from which debtors could obtain money. Creditors did not want to accept payment from either the Bank of Kentucky or the Bank of the Commonwealth; the notes of the former were depreciated due to a lack of capital and the latter had no capital and no guarantee of state credit. In December 1820, the Assembly modified the replevin law to state that creditors who would accept payment in notes from the Bank of the Commonwealth but not the Bank of Kentucky would be forced to wait three months to collect on a debt. The wait was one year if the creditor accepted only notes from the Bank of Kentucky, and it remained two years for creditors who would not accept notes from either.

By 1821, the Relief Party had successfully ended the practice of debt imprisonment in Kentucky. In December 1822, the party became so dissatisfied with the sound money practices of the Bank of Kentucky that they revoked its charter.

=== Williams v. Blair and Lapsley v. Brashear ===
Forced to choose between accepting depreciated money in payment for outstanding debts or waiting long times to collect debts, creditors turned to the courts for relief. In 1822, Bourbon County circuit court judge James Clark ruled in the case of Williams v. Blair that the replevin law violated the state and federal constitutions. This ruling was so unpopular with the Relief Party that they attempted to remove him from office, but the 59–35 vote fell just short of the needed two-thirds majority. Fayette County circuit court judge Francis P. Blair issued a similar ruling in the case of Lapsley v. Brashear.

Both cases were appealed to the Kentucky Court of Appeals—then the highest court in Kentucky—in 1823. In the case of Blair, the debt relief position was argued by George M. Bibb, while the anti-relief position was represented by Robert Wickliffe. In Lapsley, Wickliffe joined George Robertson and Ben Hardin to represent the anti-relief position, while the relief position was argued by John Rowan and William T. Barry. Chief Justice John Boyle wrote the majority opinion in Blair on October 8, 1823, and Associate Justice William Owsley issued the court's opinion in Lapsley three days later. In both cases, the anti-relief position was upheld.

== Formation of the New Court ==
The Assembly passed resolutions against all three justices on the Court of Appeals, but did not possess the two-thirds majority to remove them. Governor John Adair, a Relief Party supporter, urged the resistance, framing the issue as the court impeding the right of the people to self-govern. His efforts drew a resolution against him from the anti-relief minority on November 8, 1823.

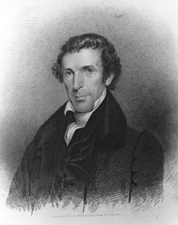
William T. Barry served as Chief Justice of the New Court

Frustrated by their defeats in the judiciary, the Relief Party turned its attention to the gubernatorial election of 1824, where they backed General Joseph Desha. Desha's election by the overwhelming vote of 38,378–22,499 was seen by the party as a mandate to pursue the relief agenda. An early proposal to reduce the salaries of the Court of Appeals justices to 25 cents per year was discarded without a vote, but the House of Representatives mustered the votes to remove the offending justices. The justices were spared removal when the Senate failed to pass the measure with a two-thirds majority. The vote was 23–12.

On December 9, 1824, the Senate voted to repeal the law that had established the Court of Appeals and to establish a new Court of Appeals with four justices. The measure came to the House floor on December 23. During the debate, Governor Desha personally lobbied legislators to support the measure, a blatant violation of the rules of the House. The next day the measure passed in the House by a vote of 54–43. Governor Desha appointed pro-relief stalwart William T. Barry as Chief Justice, and three associate justices who were also Relief Party supporters.

The existing court and the anti-relief party refused to recognize the new court as valid. Achilles Sneed, clerk of the Old Court, refused a legislative mandate to turn over his records to the New Court by January 1825. Francis Preston Blair, the New Court clerk, assembled a group that broke into Sneed's office and took what records they could find. Sneed was charged with contempt of court and fined for refusing to turn over the records. The Old Court continued to meet in a church in Frankfort; with two supreme courts, the possibility of civil war in Kentucky loomed.

== Resolution of the controversy ==
In the elections of 1825, the Old Court supporters won control of the Kentucky House of Representatives. When the General Assembly's session opened in November 1825, Old Court partisans immediately formed a committee to make recommendations related to the court of appeals. On November 23, Old Court supporters introduced a bill to repeal the reorganization act. The measure passed the House, but failed in the Senate, where Old Court and New Court supporters were equal in number; the deciding vote was cast by Lieutenant Governor Robert B. McAfee, aligned with New Court advocates. In December, the Assembly's committee concluded that the Old Court justices were "constitutional judges" and consequently, the legislature did not have power to abolish their positions. The best the Old Court supporters were able to do in 1825 was to pass a non-binding resolution condemning the reorganization act.

By 1826, economic prosperity was beginning to return to the state. The Old Court party augmented their majority in the House and gained a majority in the Senate. One legislator's proposition to resolve the controversy was to call for the resignation of the governor and lieutenant governor, the entire General Assembly, as well as the justices from both the Old and New Courts, essentially allowing the citizens to reset their entire government. This extreme measure was rejected. Instead, on December 29, 1826, the General Assembly repealed the reorganization act, and overrode Governor Desha's veto of the measure. They also repealed the replevin law that had touched off the controversy. On January 1, 1827, Francis Blair returned the court records in his possession to the Old Court.

Old Court chief justice John Boyle resigned to accept a federal judgeship. The General Assembly decided to speed the reconciliation of the two sides of the controversy by naming New Court partisan George Bibb as Boyle's replacement. Old Court justices Mills and Owsley resigned, hoping to clarify the situation further. They were immediately reappointed, but the Senate refused to confirm their appointments. The governor appointed George Robertson and Joseph R. Underwood, who were both confirmed by the Senate.

In all, the New Court heard 77 cases during the Old Court – New Court controversy. In the April 1829 case of Hildreth's Heirs v. McIntire's Devisees, the reconstituted Court of Appeals declared all of these decisions void. In 1935, in Smith v. Overstreet's Adm'r, the court formally ruled that the decisions were not part of the common law of Kentucky.

== See also ==
- Beauchamp–Sharp Tragedy - the murder of a New Court partisan during the controversy
- Isaac B. Desha - Governor Desha's son who was accused of murder during the controversy
- Bank of the Commonwealth (Kentucky)
