= William K. Wall =

Kentucky lawyer (1786–1853)

William Ketchum Wall
- Born: May 19, 1786; Washington County, Pennsylvania
- Died: March 22, 1853 (aged 66); Cynthiana, Kentucky

William Ketchum Wall (May 19, 1786–March 22, 1853) was a Kentucky politician and lawyer. He was a state judge, and a prosecutor for the Commonwealth of Kentucky for 25 years. He served in both houses of the Kentucky state legislature. According to an 1887 history of Kentucky, he was one of the most influential men in Harrison County in the first half of the 19th century.

== Life and career ==
William Ketchum Wall was born in Washington County in southwestern Pennsylvania, the son of Hannah Ketchum and John Wall. John Wall had been in the militia in Pennsylvania during the American Revolutionary War, and a farmer and "large land owner." The family moved to Mason County and then Harrison County, Kentucky in 1791, and settled on a farm about one mile outside Cynthiana. William K. Wall had three brothers, Garrett Wall, Stephen Wall, and Samuel Wall.

Wall went to school in Scott County and Harrison County, and then he and "John T. Johnson studied law together at Georgetown, in the office of Col. Richard M. Johnson." He was licensed to practice law in 1809 by judges John Allen and William McClung. He was a private in Captain Johnson's company during the War of 1812.

He served as a member of the Kentucky House of Representatives in 1814, 1815, 1816, 1817, and 1818. William K. Wall was a director of the Bank of Cynthiana in 1818. In 1825 he was prosecutor in the Isaac Desha murder case. In 1826 he was paid US$250 (equivalent to $7,114 in 2025) per quarter for his work as a state judge. He was a candidate from Harrison County to be a presidential elector in 1832. In 1836 he was a Whig candidate to be a presidential elector.

From 1820 to 1843, "under commissions from six governors, he was Attorney for the Commonwealth in the second Judicial District of Kentucky. He ran for Congress in 1843 but was defeated by John W. Tibbatts. He was a Kentucky state senator from 1846 to 1850. He was attending Whig political conventions in 1843. He chaired the Whig gubernatorial nominating convention in 1848. In 1850 he was chairman of a convention that opposed a new Kentucky state constitution.

== Personal life ==
His wife Priscilla died in 1833, possibly in the cholera epidemic that year, and she is buried in a vault tomb in Old Cynthiana Cemetery.

== Death and legacy ==
He died of pneumonia at his home in Cynthiana. His name was often prefaced by a title, such as Captain or Major or Colonel.

In 1839, Theodore Dwight Weld, Angelina Grimké, and Sarah Grimké, writing for the American Anti-Slavery Society, named Wall as one of the high-status southerners who engaged in the interstate slave trade, writing, "that a late member of the Kentucky Senate (Col. Wall) not only carried on the same business, a few years ago, but accompanied his droves in person down the Mississippi. Not as the driver, for that would be vulgar drudgery, beneath a gentleman, but as a nabob in state, ordering his understrappers."

Western Kentucky University holds two letters from Wall in its manuscript collection. Mississippi State University holds a letter to Wall from Henry Clay regarding the sale of a piece of a property.

== See also ==
- Title and rank in the antebellum U.S. South

== Sources ==
- Collins, Lewis; Collins, Richard H. (1874). Collins historical sketches of Kentucky. History of Kentucky. Vol. II. Covington, Ky.: Collins & Co.
- JCM (September 1905). "Captain John Wall and Major John Taylor. Sketch of the Revolutionary Ancestry of MRS. W. W. LONGMOOR, SR., OF FRANKFORT, KY". Register of Kentucky State Historical Society. 3 (9): 79–80. ISSN 2328-8183.
- Perrin, William Henry; Battle, J. H.; Kniffin, G. C. (1887). Kentucky: a history of the State, embracing a concise account of the origin and development of the Virginia colony, its expansion westward, and the settlement of the frontier beyond the Alleghanies: the erection of Kentucky as an independent State, and its subsequent development. Louisville, Ky.: F. A. Battey.
- Perrin, William Henry; Kniffin, G. C.; Battle, J. H. (1888b). Kentucky: a history of the state, embracing a concise account o f the origin and development of the Virginia colony; its expansion westward, and the settlement of the frontier beyond the Alleghanies; the erection of Kentucky as an independent state, and its subsequent development. Louisville, Ky.; Chicago Ill.: F. A. Battey & Company.
- Weld, Theodore Dwight; Grimké, Angelina; Grimké, Sarah Moore (1839). American Slavery As It Is: Testimony of a Thousand Witnesses. American Anti-Slavery Society. New York: Published by the American Anti-Slavery Society, office, no. 143 Nassau Street. LCCN 11008377. OCLC 14906369. OL 20509019M.
