= Robert B. McAfee =

American politician (1784–1849)

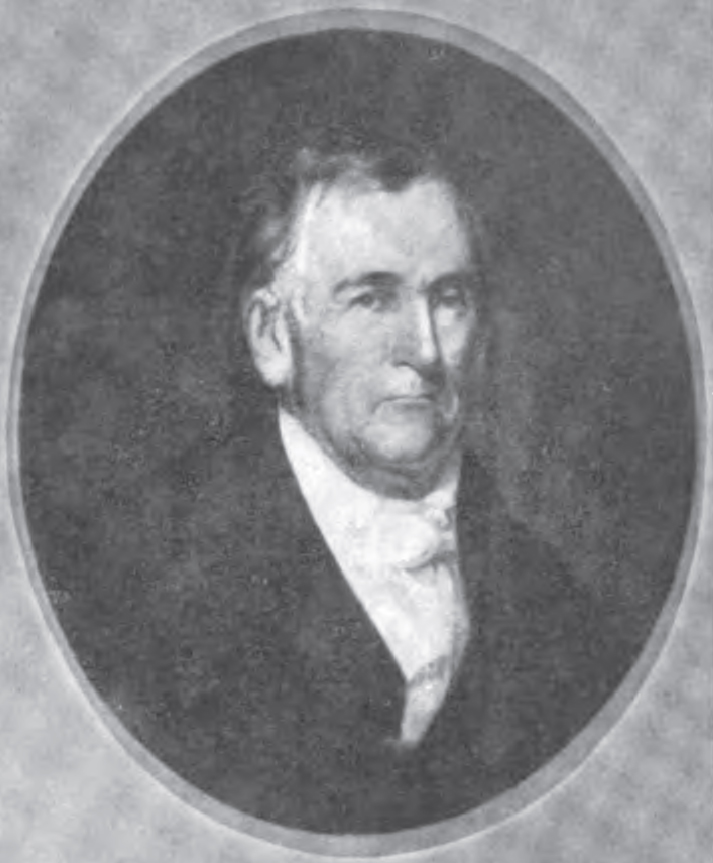

Member of the Kentucky Senate
- In office 1837–1845
- In office 1819–1824

5th United States Chargé d'Affaires, New Granada and Ecuador
- In office July 1, 1833 – June 20, 1837
- President: Andrew Jackson
- Preceded by: Thomas Patrick Moore
- Succeeded by: James Semple

8th Lieutenant Governor of Kentucky
- In office August 24, 1824 – August 26, 1828
- Governor: Joseph Desha
- Preceded by: William T. Barry
- Succeeded by: John Breathitt

Member of the Kentucky House of Representatives
- In office 1828–1832
- In office 1819–1821
- In office 1800–1812

Personal details
- Born: Robert Breckinridge McAfee; February 18, 1784 Mercer County, Kentucky
- Died: March 12, 1849 (aged 65) Salt River, Kentucky, U.S.
- Party: Democratic-Republican
- Spouse: Mary Cardwell (m. 1807)
- Education: Transylvania University

Military service
- Allegiance: United States of America
- Branch/service: United States Army
- Rank: General
- Battles/wars: War of 1812: • Battle of New Orleans • Battle of the Thames

Robert Breckinridge McAfee (February 18, 1784 – March 12, 1849) was an American diplomat, historian and politician who was the eighth lieutenant governor of Kentucky serving from 1824 to 1828.

== Early life ==
McAfee was born on February 18, 1784, in Mercer County, Kentucky. He was the son of Robert McAfee (1745–1795) and Anne (née McCoun) McAfee (1746–1794), who were distant cousins. Among his siblings was Samuel McAfee, Mary Ann (née McAfee) Adams, Sarah (née McAfee) Curran, and Anne (née McAfee) Cardwell. His brother Samuel and sister Anne both married Cardwell siblings. McAfee spent much of his leisure time in childhood hunting squirrels.

McAfee was orphaned in 1795 after his father, a pioneer of Kentucky, was killed in New Orleans, Louisiana. His guardian his father's friend and his namesake, John Breckinridge, who later became the Attorney General of the United States under President Thomas Jefferson.

== Career ==
McAfee attended Transylvania University, graduating in 1797, and after studying law with Breckinridge, was admitted to the bar in 1801 and opened a practice in Franklin County, Kentucky. In 1800, he was elected to represent Mercer County in the Kentucky House of Representatives and served there until he volunteered during the War of 1812.

=== Military service ===
During the War of 1812, McAfee served successively as sergeant, ensign and second lieutenant in the Army of the Northwest in its border campaign, then as quartermaster and lastly as captain of Richard Mentor Johnson's regiment in the expeditions against the Native Americans. He was made General in the United States Army and commanded a troop raised by order of Gen. Andrew Jackson, that took part in the Battle of New Orleans as well as the Battle of the Thames. In 1816, his book, History of the War of 1812 was published.

=== Political career ===
Following his military service, he lived in Harrodsburg, Kentucky, and was reelected to the House in 1819. In 1821, he was elected a member of the Kentucky Senate and served in the Senate until resigning his seat in 1824 to run, successfully, for Lieutenant Governor of Kentucky. McAfee was elected as a Democratic-Republican and served from August 24, 1824, to August 26, 1828, under Governor Joseph Desha. He cast a tie-breaking vote that prevented the abolition of the "New Court" during the Old Court-New Court controversy in 1825. After serving as Lt. Governor, he returned to the legislature in 1828 and remained active in Democratic politics, voting for the nomination of Andrew Jackson as president and Martin Van Buren as vice president at the 1832 Democratic National Convention in Baltimore.

On February 9, 1833, President Andrew Jackson named him Chargé d'affaires to New Granada and Ecuador, which he served after presenting his credentials at Bogotá on July 1, 1833, until he presented his recall on June 20, 1837.

After McAfee returned to Kentucky, he was again reelected twice more to the Kentucky Senate in 1837 and 1841. In 1842, he was appointed to the Board of Visitors (board of trustees) of the United States Military Academy at West Point and was elected its president in 1842.

=== Later career ===
McAfee retired from politics in 1845, he returned to his farm and later the same year, he published his autobiography, The Life and Times of Robert B. McAfee and His Family Connections.

== Personal life ==
On October 14, 1807, McAfee was married to Mary "Polly" Cardwell (1793–1850). Polly was the daughter of James Cardwell and Sarah Salley (née Crockett) Cardwell. Together, they were the parents of:

- Nancy Cardwell McAfee (d. 1857), who married William Arthur Hooe (1818–1869) in 1841.
- Louisiana J. McAfee (1809–1853), who married Robert M. Alexander (1798–1869).
- James Cardwell McAfee (1817–1877), who married Sarah Ann Edelen (1826–1899).
- Evelyn Breckenridge McAfee (1832–1914), who married William Bruce Edelen (1827–1897).

McAfee died on March 12, 1849, at his home at Salt River, Kentucky. He was buried in New Providence Churchyard in Harrodsburg, Kentucky.

Political offices
Preceded by William T. Barry	Lieutenant Governor of Kentucky; 1824–1828	Succeeded by John Breathitt
Diplomatic posts
Preceded by Thomas P. Moore	United States Chargé d'affaires, New Granada; 1833–1837	Succeeded by James Semple
