= William T. Barry =

American statesman (1784–1835)

William Barry
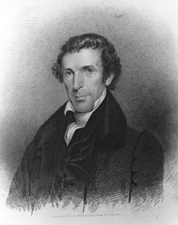

10th United States Postmaster General
- In office March 9, 1829 – April 10, 1835
- President: Andrew Jackson
- Preceded by: John McLean
- Succeeded by: Amos Kendall

16th Secretary of State of Kentucky
- In office September 2, 1824 – February 3, 1825
- Governor: Joseph Desha
- Preceded by: Thomas Bell Monroe
- Succeeded by: James Pickett

7th Lieutenant Governor of Kentucky
- In office August 29, 1820 – August 24, 1824
- Governor: John Adair
- Preceded by: Gabriel Slaughter
- Succeeded by: Robert B. McAfee

United States Senator from Kentucky
- In office February 2, 1815 – May 1, 1816
- Preceded by: George Walker
- Succeeded by: Martin D. Hardin

Member of the U.S. House of Representatives from Kentucky's 5th district
- In office August 8, 1810 – March 3, 1811
- Preceded by: Benjamin Howard
- Succeeded by: Henry Clay

Personal details
- Born: February 5, 1784 Lunenburg, Virginia, U.S.
- Died: August 30, 1835 (aged 51) Liverpool, England, UK
- Resting place: Frankfort Cemetery
- Party: Democratic-Republican (Before 1825); Democratic (1828–1835)
- Spouse(s): Lucy Overton; Catherine Mason
- Education: Transylvania University; College of William & Mary (BA)

William Taylor Barry (February 5, 1784 – August 30, 1835) was an American statesman and jurist. He served as Postmaster General for most of the administration of President Andrew Jackson and was the only Cabinet member not to resign in 1831 as a result of the Petticoat affair.

== Life ==
Born near Lunenburg, Virginia, he moved to Fayette County, Kentucky, in 1796 with his parents John Barry, an American Revolutionary War veteran, and Susannah (Dozier) Barry. His grandfather, Alexander Barry was born in Ribble Valley, Lancashire, England in 1721 and moved to America in 1744. He attended the common schools, Pisgah Academy and Kentucky Academy in Woodford County, Transylvania University at Lexington and graduated from the College of William & Mary at Williamsburg, Virginia in 1803, after which studied law and was admitted to the bar in 1805. He commenced practice at Jessamine County, Kentucky and then at Lexington.

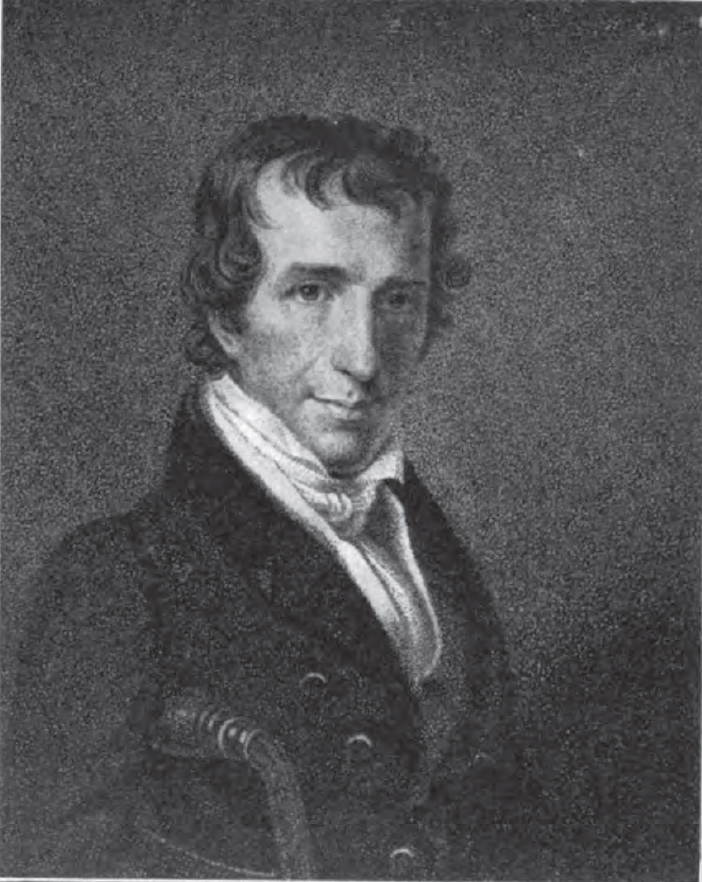
William Taylor Barry

=== Political life ===
Elected to the Kentucky House of Representatives in 1807, Barry became a member of the U.S. House of Representatives from 1810 to 1811, then served in the War of 1812. From 1815 to 1816, he became a U.S. Senator from Kentucky, then won election to the Kentucky Senate and served from 1817 to 1821. During his time in the Kentucky Senate Barry wrote to former President James Madison seeking support for a plan of subsidizing public education across the state; Madison responded enthusiastically and included in his letter of August 4, 1822 the often-cited observation: "A popular Government, without popular information or the means of acquiring it, is but a Prologue to a Farce or a Tragedy; or, perhaps both."

Meanwhile, Kentucky suffered from the Panic of 1819 and Barry became a leading figure in the debt relief party, which was successful in the elections between 1820 and 1824, although less successful when creditors challenged the relief laws in the courts. As a lawyer, Barry argued in support of those laws, which the Kentucky Court of Appeals overturned in 1823. Barry also became the sixth Lieutenant Governor of Kentucky (1820 to 1824), then served as Secretary of State of Kentucky (1824 to 1825). He resigned that position to become Chief Judge of the Kentucky Court of Appeals (the predecessor to the Kentucky Supreme Court) for the 1825 term during the Old Court - New Court controversy. Although the Old Court party won the 1826 elections, Barry ran for Governor of Kentucky in 1828.

Barry became U.S. Postmaster General in Andrew Jackson's administration, serving from 1829 to 1835. While Postmaster General, he outlawed the mailing of William Lloyd Garrison's abolitionist newspaper, The Liberator.

He was the only member of Jackson's original Cabinet not to resign as a result of the Petticoat Affair, which involved the social ostracism of Margaret O'Neill Eaton, the wife of Secretary of War John H. Eaton by a coalition of Cabinet members wives led by Second Lady Floride Calhoun. Barry, like Jackson, had sided with the Eatons.

=== Appointments and awards ===
He was appointed ambassador to Spain, but died before he could take office en route to his post, while stopped in Liverpool, England August 30, 1835. He was originally interred and a cenotaph still stands at St. James's Cemetery, Liverpool, England; he was reinterred in 1854 at Frankfort Cemetery, Frankfort, Kentucky.

Barry County, Michigan, Barry County, Missouri, Barry, Missouri, Barrytown, New York and Barryville, New York are named in his honor.

=== Societies ===
During the 1820s, Barry was a member of the prestigious society, Columbian Institute for the Promotion of Arts and Sciences, who counted among their members former presidents Andrew Jackson and John Quincy Adams and many prominent men of the day, including well-known representatives of the military, government service, medical, and other professions.

=== Personal ===
Barry was an uncle to Kentucky Governor Luke P. Blackburn.

== Biography ==
- United States Congress. "William T. Barry (id: B000192)". Biographical Directory of the United States Congress.

U.S. House of Representatives
Preceded by Benjamin Howard	Member of the U.S. House of Representatives from Kentucky's 5th congressional district 1810–1811	Succeeded by Henry Clay
U.S. Senate
Preceded by George Walker	U.S. Senator (Class 2) from Kentucky; 1815–1816; Served alongside: Jesse Bledsoe, Isham Talbot	Succeeded by Martin D. Hardin
Political offices
Preceded by Gabriel Slaughter	Lieutenant Governor of Kentucky; 1820–1824	Succeeded by Robert B. McAfee
Preceded by Thomas Bell Monroe	Secretary of State of Kentucky; 1824–1825	Succeeded by James Pickett
Preceded by John McLean	United States Postmaster General; 1829–1835	Succeeded by Amos Kendall
Party political offices
New political party	Democratic nominee for Governor of Kentucky; 1828	Succeeded by John Breathitt
