= Bank of the Commonwealth (Kentucky) =

Historic building in Kentucky, US

- U.S. National Register of Historic Places
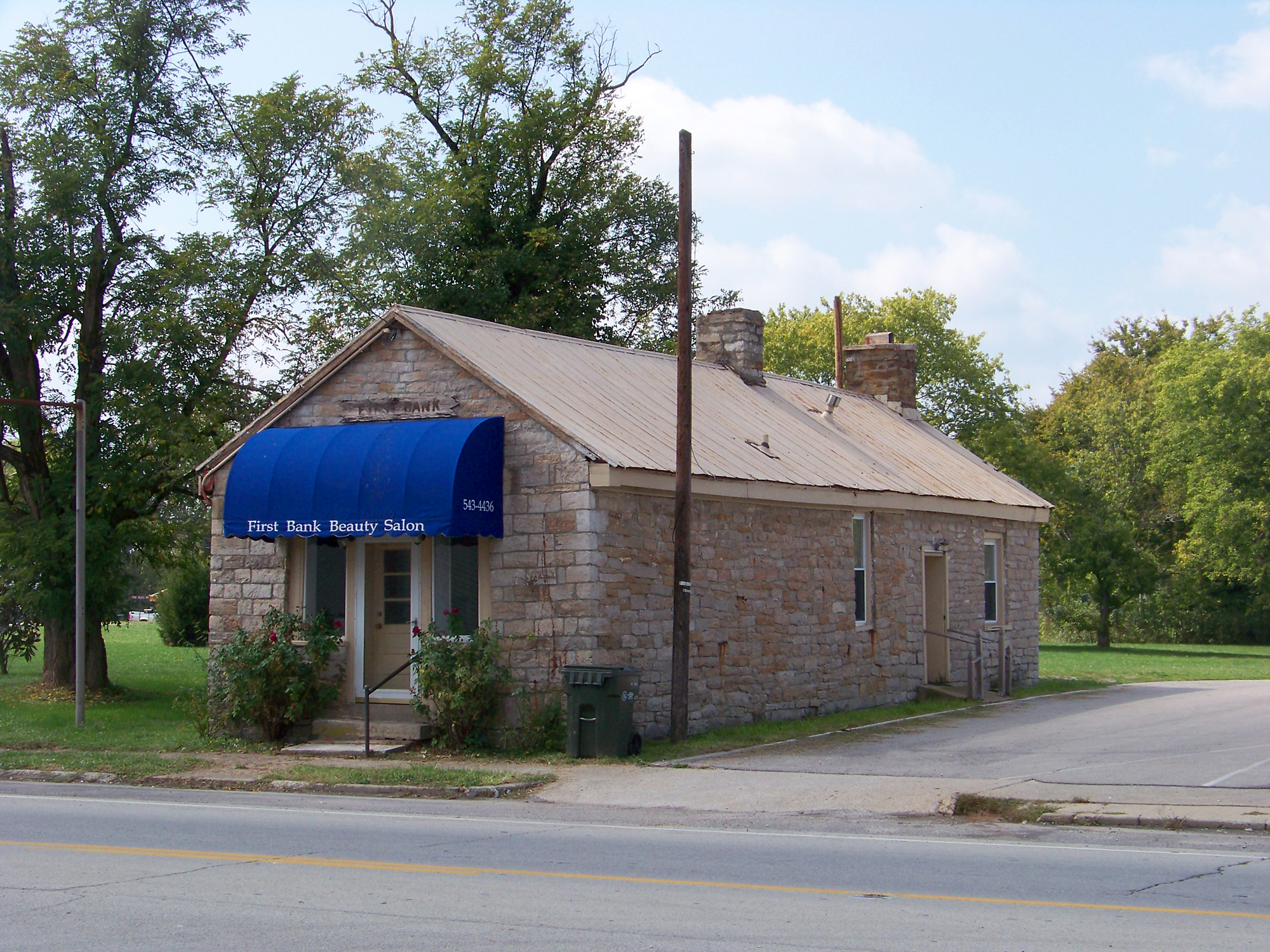

- Location within Kentucky Location within the United States
- Location: 411 S Buckman St., Shepherdsville, Kentucky
- Coordinates: 37°59′13.09″N 85°43′2.39″W
- Built: 1809
- Architectural style: Federal
- MPS: Early Stone Buildings of Kentucky Outer Bluegrass and Pennyrile TR
- NRHP reference No.: 87000173
- Added to NRHP: January 8, 1987

The Bank of the Commonwealth, also known as the Old Stone Bank, is a historic building on the National Register of Historic Places in Shepherdsville, Kentucky. According to its registration it was constructed around 1809 and operated by Abraham Field as Kentucky's first bank. Although Field, a local merchant, purchased the property in 1821, the rest of this history is in doubt, as is the building's connection to the state-owned Bank of the Commonwealth.
