= James Morehead =

James Morehead may refer to:

- James Turner Morehead (North Carolina politician) (1799–1875), Congressional Representative from North Carolina
- James T. Morehead Jr. (born 1838), his son, congressman, served in the North Carolina Senate
- James Turner Morehead (chemist) (1840–1908), chemist who founded what became Union Carbide
- James Turner Morehead (Kentucky politician) (1797–1854), senator and governor of Kentucky
- James B. Morehead (1916–2012), American fighter pilot of World War II
