= Thornton Buckner =

Virginia politician (1778–1854)

Member of the Virginia House of Delegates from Fauquier County
- In office October 10, 1814 – December 6, 1818 Serving with Thomas Marshall, Aldridge James
- Preceded by: Thomas Hunton
- Succeeded by: John P. Smith
- In office December 2, 1811 – May 16, 1813 Serving with Alexander Scott
- Preceded by: Thomas Hunton
- Succeeded by: Thomas Hunton
- In office December 5, 1808 – December 2, 1810 Serving with John Edmonds, William Clarkson
- Preceded by: William H. Macon
- Succeeded by: Augustine Jennings

Personal details
- Born: 1770 Fauquier County, Virginia
- Died: 1854 (aged 83–84) Taylor County, Kentucky
- Spouse(s): Sally Stanton, Matilda Buckner
- Relations: Richard A. Buckner (brother)
- Children: many
- Parent(s): Aylett Buckner, Judith Thornton
- Occupation: planter, politician, militia officer

Thornton Buckner (c. 1778 – 1854) was a Virginia planter, military officer and politician in Fauquier County, Virginia, which he represented in the Virginia House of Delegates for many terms before moving westward across the Appalachian Mountains to Kentucky, where he lived in Green County, and died in Taylor County decades after its creation from Green County.

== Early and family life ==
Thornton Bucker was the firstborn son born to the former Judith Thornton and her planter husband Aylette Buckner. The Buckner family had immigrated to the Virginia colony more than a century earlier, with attorney John Buckner (d. 1695) patenting considerable acreage in Gloucester County beginning in 1667 and points westward after the creation of Rappahannock Count (from which Essex County, Caroline County, Spotsylvania County and Prince William County would be formed in his children's lifetimes). The immigrant John Buckner served as the Gloucester county clerk for many years, and voters elected him as one of the two burgesses representing them part-time in the colonial capitol (Williamsburg) in 1682 and possibly in 1692 as well. Four of his sons would represent various counties early in the 18th century: John Buckner Jr. and later his brothers Robert and Richard represented Gloucester County, and William Buckner represented York County, Virginia. After following his father's example and serving as Essex County clerk for decades, Richard also became one of the first burgesses representing newly formed Caroline County before his death. This man's father, Aylett Buckner, was the firstborn son of the firstborn of burgess Richard's four sons, Major Richard Buckner, who married Elizabeth Aylett.

Aylette Buckner continued the family's westward move to developing Fauquier County, and as the 19th century began moved to Green County, Kentucky, where he died in 1811. He became a local Fauquier County justice of the peace by 1777, In 1778 he took the oath required to become Major of the Fauquier militia battalion. The elder Buckner served in the Virginia Line of the Continental Army (under Col. Armistead Churchill, until forced to resign because of ill health in 1781). After the conflict, despite a kerfuffle concerning the slow building of the county courthouse (the contractor for whom Buckner and two others stood surety was replaced), Aylett Buckner was elected the county Sheriff in 1793, but replaced in 1795. He was still alive in 1802, and possibly on the verge of moving westward into Kentucky with some sons and other relatives, when he made a gift of slaves to John T. Taylor, probably a dowry for his daughter's husband. The 1787 Virginia tax census shows Aylette Buckner owned 11 adult slaves and 17 younger slaves as well as five horses and ten cattle in the county that year, and mentions young Thornton. The family may have included four sons and four daughter. Perhaps the most distinguished was Richard Aylett Buckner (1763 or circa 1780 -1847) who moved to Green County, Kentucky (where their father may have received land grants based on his military service) and there became a legislator, judge and U.S. Congressman. Their sister Catherine Taliaferro Buckner Taylor likewise moved to Greensburg, (the seat of Green County, Kentucky) with her husband and family. In 1797, Thornton Buckner married Sally Stanton in Fauquier County, Virginia. He married Matilda Buckner in Green County, Kentucky in 1806.

== Career ==
Continuing his father's military tradition, Buckner became a captain in the Fauquier County Virginia militia in 1794, a year after he served as a deputy sheriff for the county. He was promoted to major in the Fauquier County militia in 1798. By the time the Virginia militia was called into service in the U.S. Army during the War of 1812, Thornton Buckner held the rank of colonel, and was discharged in Richmond in 1814.

For most of his adult life, Buckner farmed using enslaved labor. In the 1810 census, he owned 11 slaves, and 20 slaves in the 1820 census. In 1811, he was the first son mentioned in his father's probated will, although the document distributed Fauquier County land to his brother Richard adjacent to land Aylett Buckner had sold before he left, and another sister was given an enslaved woman.

Fauquier County voters elected Buckner as one of their delegates (part-time) to the Virginia House of Delegates in 1808, and with two one-year lapses continued to re-elect him annually for a decade.

Thornton Buckner visited his father, siblings and other relatives in Kentucky, then moved his family across the Appalachian Mountains to Green County, Kentucky by 1830, in which census his household included eleven free white people and seventeen slaves. A decade later the number of free white people in the Buckner household had decreased to seven through death or marriage, but the number of enslaved people had increased to nineteen. By 1850, the Buckner family resided in Taylor County, which had been created from Green County. This more detailed census noted Buckner's occupation as a farmer, estimated his real estate as worth $13,500 and gave ages for him, his 60-year-old wife and their adult daughters Matilda and Ellen and 23-year-old son Charles. By that year, the number of enslaved people in the household had increased to more than 30, ranging from 63-, 55- and 42-year-old Black men and 57- and 55-year-old Black women to Black boys of 7 and 3 years old and a 3-month-old infant as well as a Mulatto 7-year-old boy, a 7-year-old Black girl, four 5-year old, four 3-year-old, one 2-year-old, two 1-year-old girls and an 8-month-old baby girl.

== Death and legacy ==
Buckner died in Taylor County, Kentucky in 1854.
