= Richard Buckner =

Richard Buckner may refer to:

- Richard Buckner (artist) (1812–1883), English portrait painter
- Richard Aylett Buckner (1763–1847), United States Representative from Kentucky
- Richard Buckner (musician), American singer-songwriter
- Richard Buckner (burgess) (?–c. 1733), colonial Virginian politician
