= Frank Mebane =

American industrialist

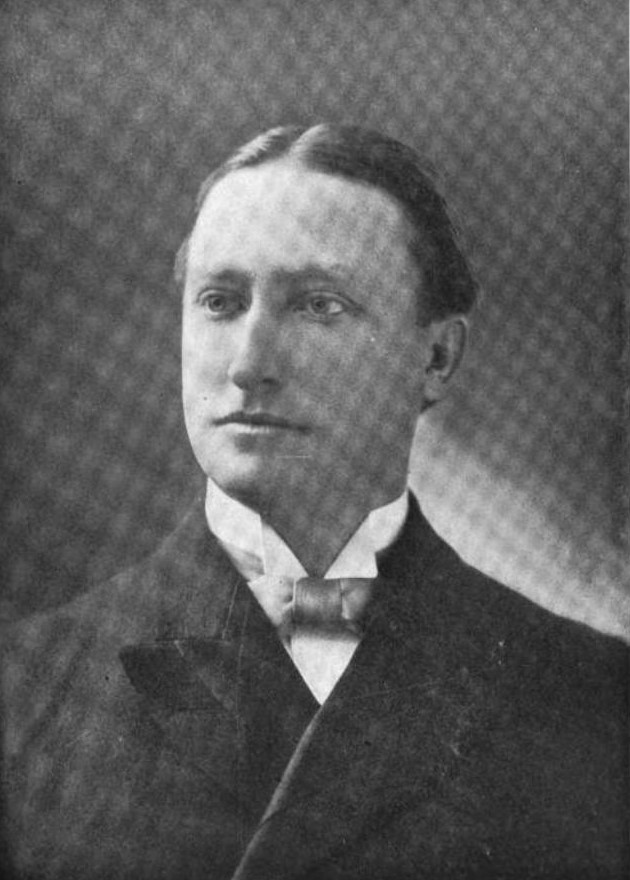
Mebane

Benjamin Franklin Mebane Jr. (February 4, 1865 – June 15, 1926) was an American industrialist.

== Early life ==
Benjamin Franklin Mebane Jr. was born on February 4, 1865, in Mebanesville, North Carolina, to Benjamin Franklin Mebane and Frances Lavinia Kerr Mebane. He was descended from Alexander Mebane, a Continental Army officer and U.S. Congressman for whom the town was named. He was educated at the Bingham School.

On February 8, 1893, Mebane married Lily Morehead, the granddaughter of industrialist and former governor of North Carolina John Motley Morehead.

== Career ==
=== Industry and business ===
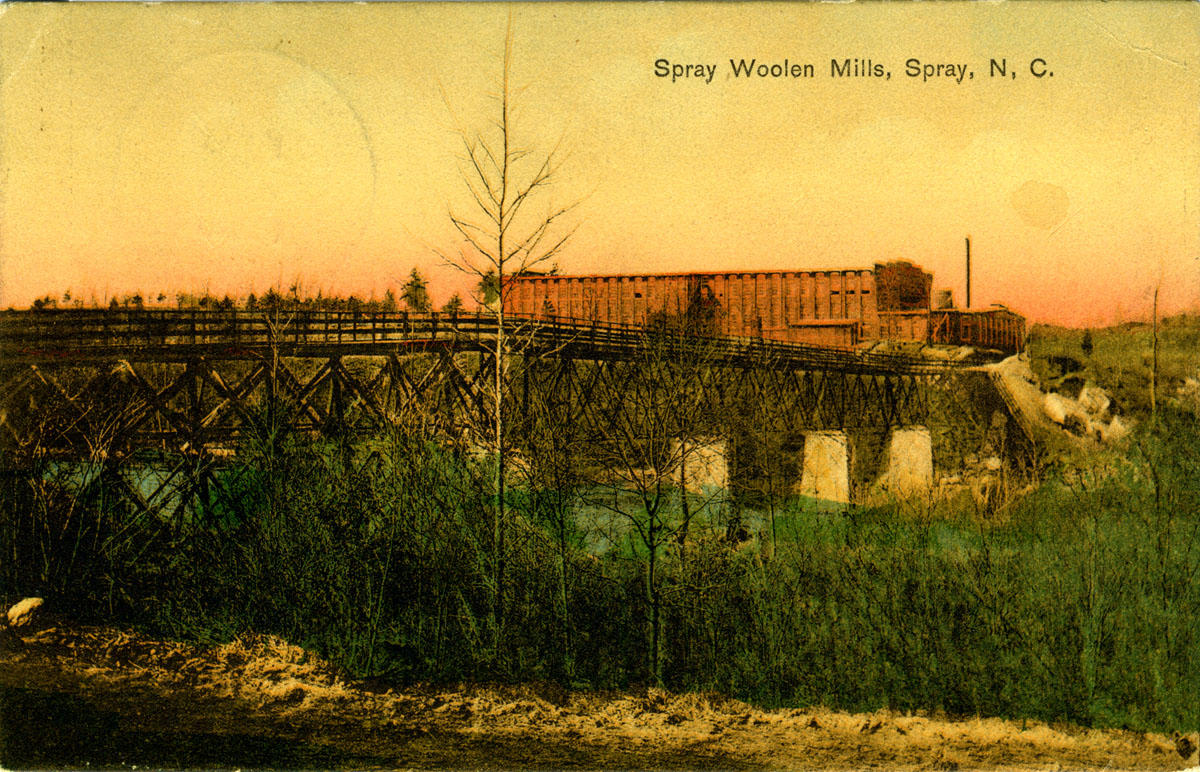
Spray Woolen Mills

When he was 17 years of age, Mebane left school and worked as a salesman in Danville, Virginia, and New York City. After having married, he moved to Spray, North Carolina. Mebane's father-in-law, James Turner Morehead, was the founder of the Leaksville Cotton and Woolen Mill Company and the Spray Water Power and Land Company. Morehead educated Mebane on the textile industry, and then Mebane moved to Greensboro and worked for the Cone Mills Corporation. Morehead later had Mebane become the president of both of his companies, and the latter proceeded to create six new textile mills and one warehouse company: Nantucket Mill in 1898, American Warehouse in 1899, Lily Mill in 1900, Spray Woolen Mill and Morehead Mills in 1902, Rhode Island Mill in 1903, and, with William F. Draper, the German-American Stock Company Mill in Draper in 1906.

In 1911 and 1912 Mebane created the North Carolina and Virginia Railroad. With the railroad having expended much of his financial resources, his main creditor, the Marshall Field Corporation of Chicago, assumed control of all but two of Mebane's mills. Control of them would later pass to Fieldcrest. Mebane also retained, through his Spray Water Power and Land Company and Rockingham Company, possession of 8,000 acres of farmland—known as "the Meadows"—near the confluence of the Smith and Dan Rivers and the town of Draper. There, he developed a successful cattle business and established a hunting lodge.

=== Political involvement and the Fishing Creek Bridge ===
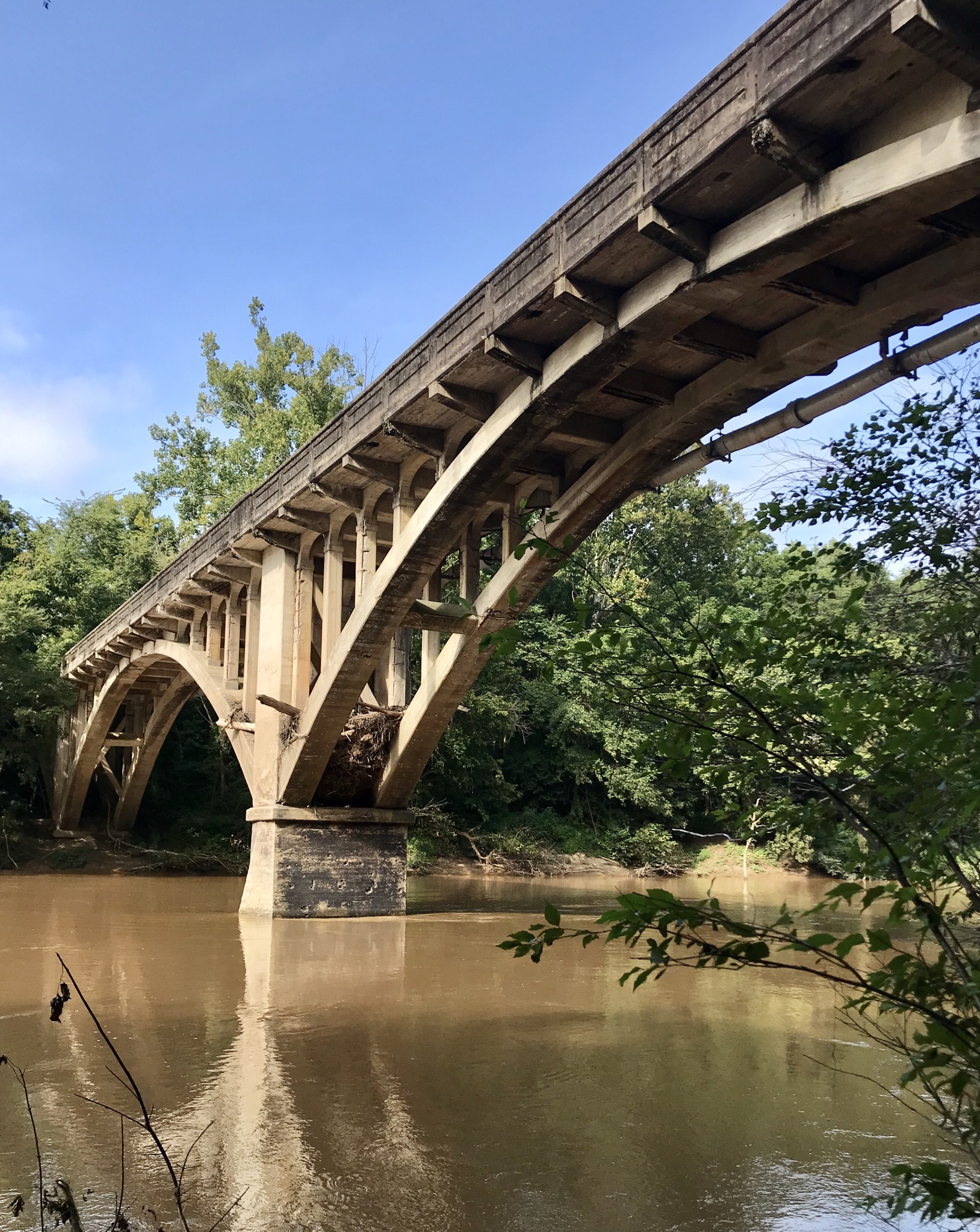
Mebane's Bridge

Mebane was a prominent member of the Republican Party in Rockingham County, which was dominated by the Democratic Party during his life. He served as a delegate-at-large during the 1904 Republican National Convention. With the support of friends and his workers, he was elected to the county school board, where he served from 1919 to 1925.

In the early 1920s, Mebane sought to construct a chemical plant in the Meadows. The only modern crossing over the Dan River in the vicinity of this area connecting his land to the nearby towns was the North Carolina Highway 87 bridge. Due to be completed in 1924, it was 1.5 miles upstream from the Meadows. Wanting a more direct route to his plant from the towns, Mebane decided that a new bridge should be constructed near the confluence of Fishing Creek and the Dan River. Mebane's full reasoning for wanting to have a road bridge erected—such as to make way for trucks instead of relying on rail depots—has never been made clear.

Though he would benefit the most from a bridge, Mebane thought that a crossing in the area would benefit industrial growth in Rockingham County and thought that the county government should pay for its construction. In 1922, he sought out three men to support his proposal: Josiah Ferre McCollum, Thomas Ruffin Pratt, and William Franklin Pruitt. Local newspapers later asserted that Mebane entertained the three—two farmers and a local merchant—at his mansion to convince them to back his plan. Mebane quietly helped the three men get elected to the five-person Rockingham County Board of Commissioners that year as Democrats. Shortly after taking office, Pratt, Pruitt, and McCollum formally proposed the construction of a bridge near the Meadows property. The two other commissioners on the board expressed reservations, noting that the Highway 87 bridge was due to be completed soon nearby. Undaunted, Mebane's commissioners, having a majority on the board, voted on March 19, 1923, that a bridge near the confluence of Fishing Creek and the Dan River was a "public necessity". They authorized the county to retain an engineer and pay up to $50,000 to erect a crossing at the site. Plans that year were also made to construct a $7,000 road to link the bridge to other thoroughfares.

The massive outlays for the road construction and an additional school construction program adopted by the commissioners required altering the county's financing. The commission raised the county's tax rate and issued new bonds with high interest rates, increasing the county's debt by nearly one-third. The tax hikes, the large expenditures, and the apparent cronyism of the bridge project enraged many county residents. A group of lawyers filed for an injunction court to prevent the commission from signing a contract to build the bridge. The injunction was denied on appeal, and the bridge opponents instead formed a "Citizens Committee" and organized three mass meetings at the Rockingham County Courthouse to protest the project. Speakers at the sessions denounced the bridge plan as a waste of money and as a sign that special interests were in control of the county commission. Discussion of the bridge faded over the following months, with many residents convinced that the unpopularity of the project would dissuade the commissioners from taking further action. Despite this, on January 7, 1924, Mebane's commissioners voted to contract the Luten Bridge Company of Knoxville, Tennessee, for $39,670 (~$574,140 in 2024) to build a crossing to be named the Fishing Creek Bridge.

County residents were enraged by the signing of the contract, and the political situation became so tense that Pruitt resigned and was replaced by an anti-bridge commissioner. The anti-bridge commissioners, now comprising the majority on the county board, resolved to not honor the bridge contract. The contractor nevertheless continued to work on the project, and completed the bridge by November. Mebane arranged for his Spray Water Power and Land Company to give the firm $25,000 in liberty bonds to help cover their expenses. The connecting road project was left unfinished.

== Death and legacy ==
Mebane died after a brief illness on June 15, 1926, in New York City, while awaiting passage to London aboard the RMS Aquitania to visit his wife. She received his $2,000,000 (~$28.3 million in 2024) estate. His death was reported in national news and received significant coverage in much of North Carolina's media. Despite the controversy of the bridge project, most posthumous coverage of Mebane was positive, praising his business acumen. In 1935 the North Carolina Department of Transportation built dirt routes to the Fishing Creek Bridge, connecting it to other roads. In 1968, the roads were paved and the crossing was renamed Mebane's Bridge. It is sometimes referred to as "Mebane's Folly" in reference to Mebane's determination to have it constructed.

== Works cited ==
- Carter, Bob (June 2004). "The Bridge To Nowhere: The Great Mebane's Bridge Controversy" (PDF). The Journal of Rockingham County History and Genealogy. XXIX (1): 1–23.
- Osgoodby, William Gardner, ed. (1904). The Republican National Convention, 1904,: With Portraits of Many of the Distinguished Members of the Party, a Concise History of the Republican Party from Its Birth, Extracts from Its First and Last Platforms, Convention Speeches and Other Historical and Political Information. New York & Washington, D.C.: Illustrated Publishing Company of America.
- Richman, Barak D. (2007). "The King of Rockingham County and the Original Bridge to Nowhere". Contracts Stories. Foundation Press. ISBN 9781587787218.
