= Governor Breathitt =

Governor Breathitt may refer to:

- John Breathitt (1786–1834), 11th Governor of Kentucky
- Ned Breathitt (1924–2003), 51st Governor of Kentucky
