= Morehead-Cain Scholarship =

University of North Carolina scholarship

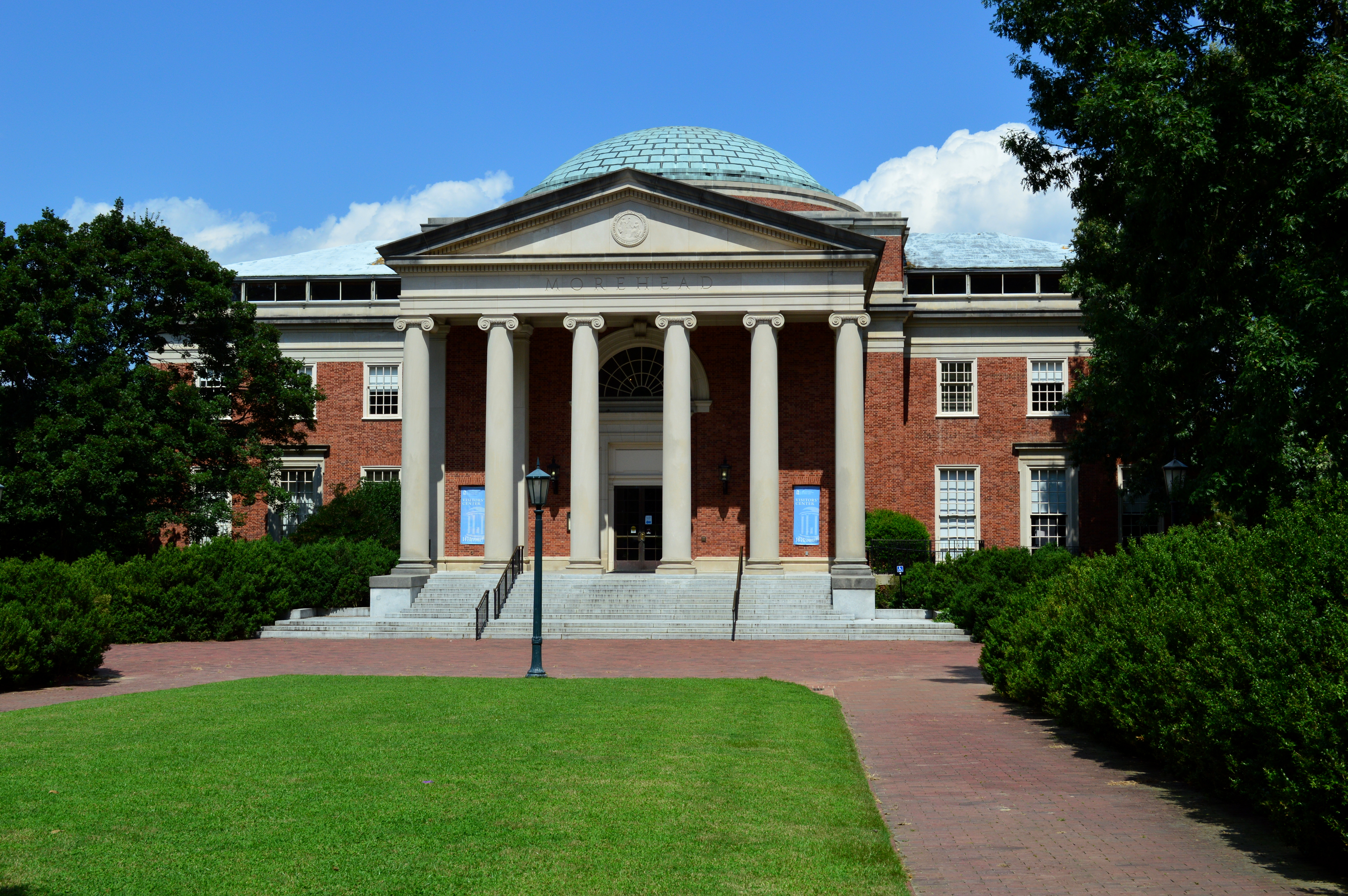
- Morehead Planetarium and Science Center
- Awarded for: Merit-based to high school seniors
- Description: Full scholarship to attend the University of North Carolina at Chapel Hill
- Sponsored by: Morehead Cain Foundation
- Location: Chapel Hill, North Carolina, USA
- Formerly called: Morehead Scholarship
- Established: 1951
- Website: moreheadcain.org

The Morehead-Cain Scholarship (previously known as the Morehead Scholarship from 1951 to 2007) is a scholarship program at the University of North Carolina at Chapel Hill. It admits high school seniors and covers their expenses for four years of undergraduate education at UNC Chapel Hill, as well as their summer enrichment activities, independent research, internships, and international study.

The program was founded in 1951. It was named after John Motley Morehead III in 1951 and also after the Gordon and Mary Cain Foundation in 2007.

== History ==
In 1945, John Motley Morehead III bequeathed US$130 million to the University of North Carolina at Chapel Hill to create the John Motley Morehead Foundation and the university's Morehead Planetarium. The Morehead Foundation created the Morehead scholarship program in 1951. This undergraduate scholarship covers expenses for four years of study at UNC Chapel Hill. Morehead-Cain scholars can also access "a network of peers and mentors, challenging internships and summer experiences, and an opportunity to travel the world."

The Morehead scholarship's first director was Robert Fetzer, a former UNC Chapel Hill track coach and athletic director. In 1958, he was replaced by Roy Armstrong, former director of admissions at the university. In 1972, Mebane M. Pritchett, a Morehead alumnus, became the executive director and served until 1987. Charles E. Lovelace Jr., another Morehead alumnus, was the next president. The current president is Chris Bradford.

Starting in 1974, the scholarship began to provide international travel and internships opportunities through the Morehead Summer Enrichment Program. The program is now structured across four summers and fully funds activities in four areas: a three-week outdoor leadership course, research or travel across five to twelve weeks, professional experience through an internship, and working on a community's challenges for eight to ten weeks.

Originally for students from North Carolina, the program expanded to include students from across the United States in 1954. In 1968, the first Morehead scholar from the United Kingdom was selected, followed by the inclusion of women in 1974. The program now includes students from Canada and some other countries.

The foundation and scholarship were respectively renamed the Morehead-Cain foundation and scholarship in 2007, following a US$100 million donation from the Gordon and Mary Cain Foundation to expand the program. Mary Cain said that this gift was in honor of her husband Gordan, a major stockholder in Union Carbide and helped found Texas Petrochemicals. Before Mary Cain's gift, the Morehead Foundation had US$115 million.

There are about 200 Morehead-Cain scholars on campus at UNC-Chapel Hill at any given time. With about 2,000 nominees, the 2022 freshman class of Morehead-Cain scholars includes 75 students: 41 scholars from North Carolina, 34 from other U.S. states, and ten international scholars from Canada, India, South Sudan, the United Kingdom, and Vietnam.

== Notable alumni ==
- Jerry Blackwell, prosecutor in the Derek Chauvin murder trial
- Roy Cooper, US senator-elect from North Carolina, 75th governor of North Carolina, and 50th attorney general of North Carolina
- James G. Exum, chief justice of the North Carolina Supreme Court
- Francis Collins, former director of the National Institutes of Health and the Human Genome Project
- Shilpi Somaya Gowda, best-selling novelist
- Matthew Heyd, Episcopal priest
- Candice Woodcock, a contestant on Survivor: Cook Islands and Survivor: Heroes vs. Villains

== See also ==
- Jefferson Scholarship
- Robertson Scholars Program
