= Mebane (surname) =

Mebane is a surname. Notable people with the surname include:

- Alexander Mebane, (1744–1795), American politician from North Carolina
- Brandon Mebane (born 1985), American football player
- Giles Mebane (1809–1899), American politician from North Carolina
- Lily Morehead Mebane (1869–1943), American relief worker during World War I
- Walter Mebane (born 1958), American political scientist
