= 1832 Kentucky gubernatorial election =

- August 6, 1832
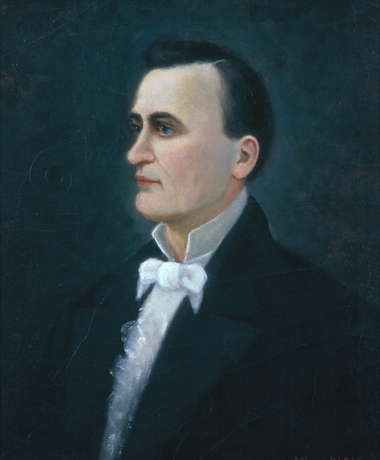

| Nominee | John Breathitt | Richard A. Buckner |
| Party | Democratic | National Republican |
| Popular vote | 40,715 | 39,473 |
| Percentage | 50.77% | 49.23% |
- Breathitt: 50–60% 60–70% 70–80% 80–90% >90% Buckner: 50–60% 60–70% 70–80%
Governor before election
Thomas Metcalfe
National Republican
Elected Governor
John Breathitt
Democratic

The 1832 Kentucky gubernatorial election was held on August 6, 1832.

Incumbent National Republican Governor Thomas Metcalfe was term-limited, and could not seek a second consecutive term.

Democratic nominee John Breathitt defeated National Republican nominee Richard A. Buckner with 50.77% of the vote.

Breathitt died on February 21, 1834, and was succeeded by Lieutenant Governor Whig James T. Morehead.

== General election ==
=== Candidates ===
- John Breathitt, Democratic, incumbent Lieutenant Governor of Kentucky
- Richard A. Buckner, National Republican, former U.S. Representative

=== Results ===
1832 Kentucky gubernatorial election (Note: Some sources give the result as Breathitt 40,780, Buckner 39,269.)
| Party | Candidate | Votes | % | ±% |
|---|---|---|---|---|
| Democratic | John Breathitt | 40,715 | 50.77% | +1.15% |
| National Republican | Richard A. Buckner | 39,473 | 49.23% | −1.15% |
| Majority | | 1,242 | 1.56% | |
| Turnout | | 80,188 | | |
| Democratic gain from National Republican | | Swing | | |
