= James T. Morehead (Kentucky politician) =

American politician and lawyer (1797–1854)

James Turner Morehead
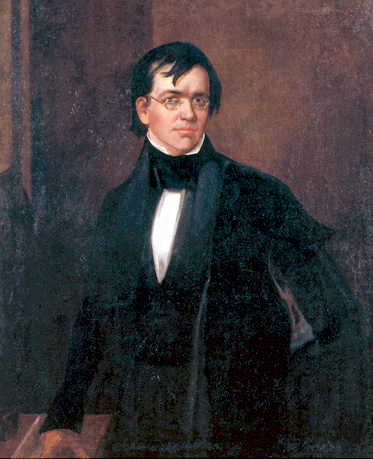

United States Senator from Kentucky
- In office March 4, 1841 – March 3, 1847
- Preceded by: John J. Crittenden
- Succeeded by: Joseph R. Underwood

12th Governor of Kentucky
- In office February 21, 1834 – August 30, 1836
- Lieutenant: Vacant
- Preceded by: John Breathitt
- Succeeded by: James Clark

10th Lieutenant Governor of Kentucky
- In office September 4, 1832 – February 21, 1834
- Governor: John Breathitt
- Preceded by: John Breathitt
- Succeeded by: Charles A. Wickliffe

Member of the Kentucky House of Representatives
- In office 1828–1831

Personal details
- Born: May 24, 1797 Bullitt County, Kentucky, US
- Died: December 28, 1854 (aged 57) Covington, Kentucky, US
- Resting place: Frankfort Cemetery
- Party: National Republican, Whig
- Spouse(s): Susan Helm Roberts (m. 1823, w. 1838); Lavinia Espy (m. 1839)
- Relations: Cousin of John Motley Morehead
- Education: Transylvania University
- Profession: Lawyer

James Turner Morehead (May 24, 1797 – December 28, 1854) was an American politician who was a United States Senator and the 12th governor of Kentucky. He was the first native-born Kentuckian to hold the governorship of the state. A member of Henry Clay's National Republican Party, Morehead entered politics just as his party was beginning to challenge the Democratic Party's dominance in the state.

Morehead was nominated for lieutenant governor at his party's nominating convention in Baltimore, Maryland in 1831, and was elected on a split ticket with Democratic governor John Breathitt. He ascended to the governorship upon Breathitt's death in 1834. Saddled with a shortened term, Morehead was not able to formulate a significant legislative agenda, and stuck to the politically safe issue of internal improvements during his term. When his party changed its name to the Whig Party and wrested control of the General Assembly from the Democrats in the summer of 1834, Morehead hosted the new party's first nominating convention in Frankfort.

Following his term as governor, Morehead returned to the state legislature. An opponent of abolitionism, he accompanied John Speed Smith to Ohio to secure the return of slaves owned by Kentuckians. He was later appointed to the U.S. Senate, where he remained a close ally of Clay's. In 1847, he retired to Covington, Kentucky, practicing law until his death in 1854. The city of Morehead, Kentucky, is named in honor of Governor Morehead.

== Early life and career ==
James Turner Morehead was born on May 24, 1797, near Shepherdsville, Kentucky, in Bullitt County. His parents, Armistead and Lucy (Latham) Morehead, moved to Russellville, Kentucky, when he was very young, and he was educated at the public schools in that city. He attended Transylvania University in Lexington, Kentucky, from 1813 to 1815. He then returned to Russellville, where he studied law under circuit court judge H. P. Broadnax and John J. Crittenden. He was admitted to the bar in 1818, and commenced practice in Bowling Green, Kentucky.

On May 1, 1823, Morehead married Susan Helm Roberts. The couple had four children, three sons and a daughter. He was elected to the Kentucky House of Representatives representing Warren County from 1828 to 1831. While there, he served on the Committee on Internal Improvements, and reported a bill for state subscription to the Maysville-Lexington Turnpike Company in 1831.

== Governor of Kentucky ==
In 1831, Morehead was also a delegate to the National Republican Party Convention in Baltimore, Maryland that nominated Henry Clay for president. During the convention, he was nominated for the office of lieutenant governor. Though his National Republican running mate, Richard A. Buckner, was defeated by Democrat John Breathitt, Morehead was elected the ninth Lieutenant Governor.

Governor Breathitt died of tuberculosis on February 21, 1834, and Morehead was sworn in as governor the following day. The replacement of a Democratic governor with one from the rival National Republican party caused a great deal of angst among Democrats, but the ascendancy of Democrat James Guthrie to president of the state senate and Morehead's willingness to retain Breathitt's secretary of state, Lewis Saunders, did much to allay their fears.

Later that year, the National Republican party began to re-brand itself as the Whig Party, a name that first appeared in the Lexington Intelligencer on April 25, 1834. On July 4, 1834, Governor Morehead hosted the party's first convention in Frankfort. Kentuckians flocked to the "new" party en masse, and the legislative elections of August 1834 saw the party garner majorities in both houses of the state legislature. Flexing their political muscles, the majority party ousted Guthrie from his post as president of the Senate and by a vote of 90–40, and sent John J. Crittenden instead of Guthrie to the U.S. Senate in 1835.

In his first address to the legislature, Morehead recommended a plan of expanded internal improvements, including improvements along the state's rivers. The legislature responded by creating a state board of internal improvements, and named Morehead the ex-officio president of the board. In this role, he authorized many surveys of Kentucky's rivers and formulated several plans for improvements, but most of them were blocked by the Panic of 1837. One improvement that did proceed was construction of the Lexington and Ohio Railroad, which was completed in 1835. Though education was not a high priority for Governor Morehead, the Kentucky Common School Society and the Kentucky Association of Professional Teachers were formed during his term.

== Later life and career ==
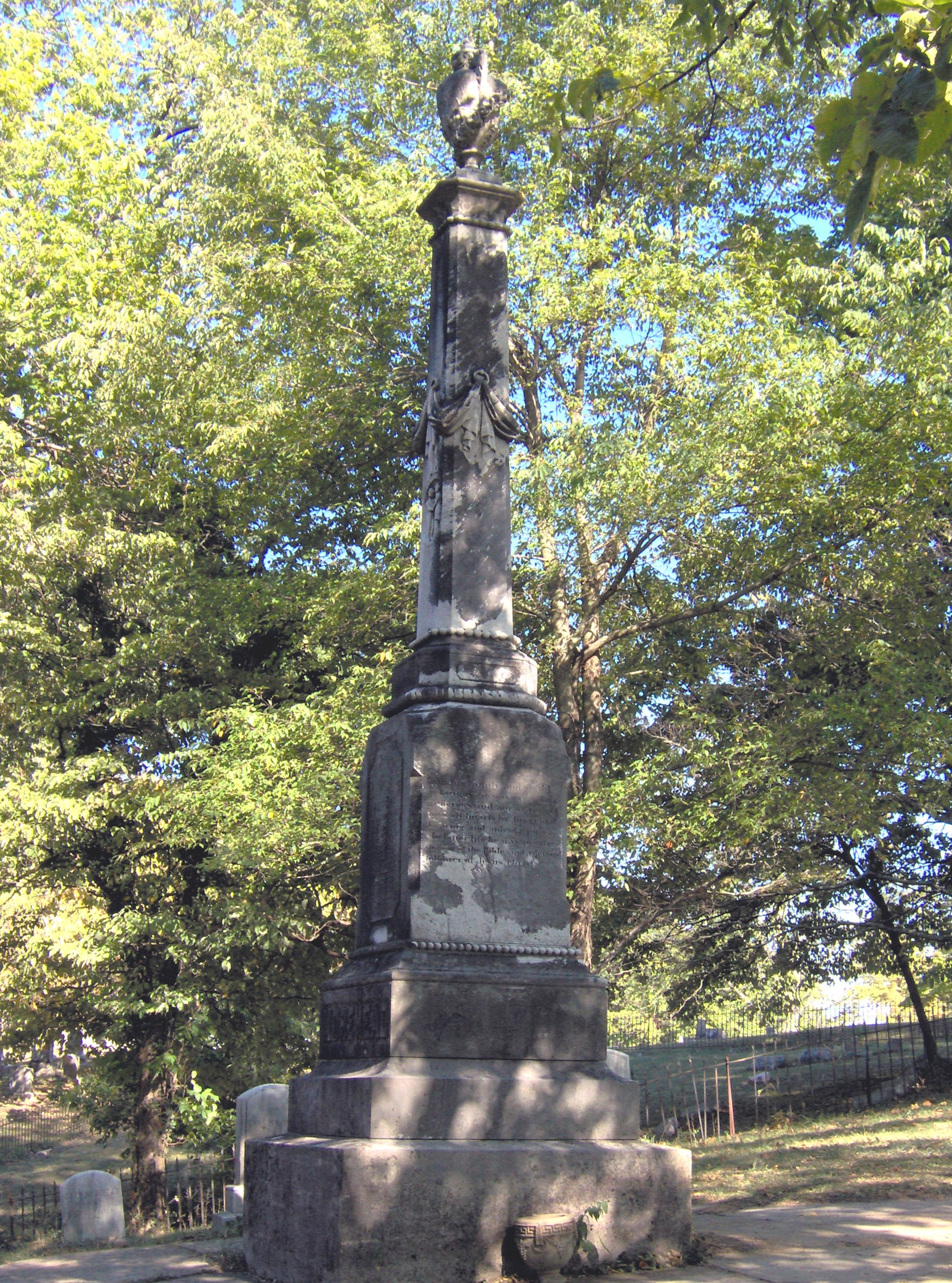
Gravestone of Morehead in Frankfort Cemetery

Following his service as governor, Morehead resumed his legal practice in Frankfort, Kentucky. In March 1837, he was commissioned by Governor James Clark to act as an agent for the state, selling bonds to fund internal improvements. He returned to the state House from 1837 to 1838, representing Franklin County. He was president of the Kentucky Board of Internal Improvements from 1838 to 1841, and in 1839, he and John Speed Smith were chosen as commissioners to the state of Ohio to secure the return of Kentucky-owned slaves as property of their masters. They were successful in this endeavor.

Following his first wife's death in 1838, Morehead married Lavinia Espy in 1839. The couple had six children together, five sons and a daughter.

Learned in Kentucky history, Morehead published An Address in Commemoration of the First Settlement of Kentucky, which contained original information regarding the early settlement of Boonesborough, Kentucky, in 1840. In 1846, he published another book, Practice in Civil Actions and Proceedings at Law.

In 1841, Morehead was elected to the U.S. Senate and served from March 4, 1841, to March 3, 1847. There he was chairman of the U.S. Senate Committee on Indian Affairs and the Committee on Retrenchment. During his service in the Senate, he defended a federal bank bill and opposed the annexation of Texas, though he supported the U.S.-Mexican War after it began. He was also a staunch supporter of fellow Kentuckian Henry Clay.

After his time in Congress, he continued the practice of law in Covington, Kentucky, until his death. He was interred in the State lot of Frankfort Cemetery, Frankfort, Kentucky. The city of Morehead, Kentucky, was named after him.

Political offices
Preceded by John Breathitt	Lieutenant Governor of Kentucky; 1832–1834	Succeeded by Charles A. Wickliffe
Preceded by John Breathitt	Governor of Kentucky; 1834–1836	Succeeded by James Clark
U.S. Senate
Preceded by John J. Crittenden	U.S. senator (Class 2) from Kentucky; 1841–1847; Served alongside: Henry Clay, John J. Crittenden	Succeeded by Joseph R. Underwood
