= James Turner Morehead (North Carolina politician) =

American politician

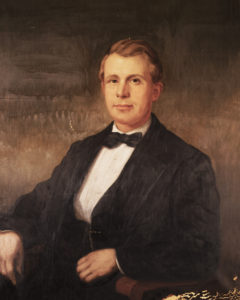
- James Turner Morehead

Member of the U.S. House of Representatives from North Carolina's 4th district
- In office March 4, 1851 – March 3, 1853
- Preceded by: Augustine H. Shepperd
- Succeeded by: Sion H. Rogers

Personal details
- Born: January 11, 1799 Pittsylvania County, Virginia
- Died: May 5, 1875 (aged 76) Greensboro, North Carolina
- Party: Whig
- Relations: John Motley Morehead (brother); James Turner Morehead (nephew); John Motley Morehead III (son)
- Education: University of North Carolina at Chapel Hill
- Occupation: Lawyer

James Turner Morehead (January 11, 1799 – May 5, 1875) was the younger brother of North Carolina Governor John Motley Morehead and a Congressional Representative from North Carolina.

He was born in Rockingham County, North Carolina, on January 11, 1799; he attended the common schools and graduated from the University of North Carolina at Chapel Hill in 1819. A lawyer, Morehead studied law, was admitted to the bar and commenced practice in Greensboro, North Carolina, before going into politics. First, he served as commissioner of Greensboro in 1832, 1834, and 1835; then as a member of the North Carolina Senate in 1835, 1836, 1838, 1840, and 1842. He was also a trustee of his alma mater, the University of North Carolina, from 1836 to 1868.

In 1850, he was elected as a Whig to the Thirty-second Congress (March 4, 1851 - March 4, 1853); after his term was up, he declined to be a candidate for renomination in 1852 to the Thirty-third Congress.

After retiring from national politics, he resumed the practice of his profession, and also engaged in agricultural pursuits and operated an iron works. Morehead died in Greensboro, N.C., on May 5, 1875. He is interred in the Presbyterian Cemetery there.

== See also ==
- Thirty-second United States Congress

U.S. House of Representatives
Preceded by Augustine H. Shepperd	Member of the U.S. House of Representatives from North Carolina's 4th congressional district 1851–1853	Succeeded by Sion H. Rogers
