= Lily Morehead Mebane =

American politician and humanitarian (1869–1943)

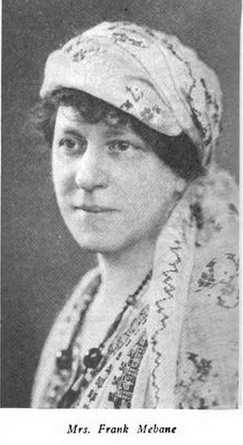
- Lily Morehead Mebane, from a 1921 publication. She dressed in traditional Romanian embroidered fabrics, during her time as a relief worker based at Bucharest.

Member of the North Carolina House of Representatives from Rockingham County
- In office 1931–1935 Serving with Hugh Nelson Binford
- Preceded by: Price Henderson Gwynn; William B. Wray
- Succeeded by: Harry R. Lindsey; Thomas Clarence Stone

Personal details
- Born: August 13, 1869 Spray, North Carolina, U.S.
- Died: June 15, 1943 (aged 73) Spray, North Carolina, U.S.
- Resting place: Lawson Cemetery, Eden, North Carolina, U.S.
- Spouse: Benjamin Franklin Mebane Jr. (m. 1893; died 1926)
- Parents: James Turner Morehead (father); Mary Lily Connally (mother)
- Relatives: John Motley Morehead III (brother); John Motley Morehead (grandfather)
- Education: Peace Institute
- Occupation: politician, relief worker
- Awards: Serbian Cross of Mercy; French Legion of Honour

Lily Connally Morehead Mebane (August 13, 1869 – June 15, 1943) was an American relief worker, politician, and heiress. During World War I, she chaired the Rockingham County Committee of the North Carolina Division of the Woman's Committee of the Council of National Defense. She worked in France and Romania with the American Committee for Devastated France, where she met Queen Marie of Romania. She remained friends with the Queen Marie until the queen's death in 1938. For her relief work during the war, Mebane was awarded the Cross of Mercy by King Peter I of Serbia and was made Knight of the Legion of Honour by the French government.

In 1930, Mebane organized the first public library in Rockingham County. Later that year she ran for public office, and is considered the first woman to seek public office in Rockingham County. In 1931, she was elected to the North Carolina General Assembly, representing Rockingham County in the North Carolina House of Representatives. She served in the house of representatives for two terms and, after her re-election in 1933, she chaired the Committee on Public Welfare. She was also a registered member of the Conference for Education in the South. Mebane was unanimously endorsed by the North Carolina House of Representatives and the North Carolina Senate to succeed her brother, John Motley Morehead III, as the United States Ambassador to Sweden, but was not appointed to the position. In 1934, she ran an unsuccessful campaign for a seat in the United States Congress.

Mebane was married to Benjamin Franklin Mebane Jr., who worked as a textile industry executive with her father, James Turner Morehead. She and her husband were formally presented to King George V and Queen Mary at the Court of Saint James. After her husband's death in 1926, Mebane inherited his entire estate, estimated to be worth $2,000,000. A collection of her diaries and notes are archived in the Morehead-Mebane Collection at Rockingham Community College. Ten years after her death, Rockingham County celebrated "Lily Morehead Mebane Day" to recognize her role in founding the county library system. Due to her life in public service, she has been called "Rockingham County's First Lady".

== Early life ==
Lily Connally Morehead was born in Spray, North Carolina, the daughter of James Turner Morehead and Mary Lily Connally Morehead. Her father, a textile manufacturer, was a veteran of the Confederate Army during the American Civil War and the founder of the Leaksville Cotton and Woolen Mill Company and the Spray Water Power and Land Company. Her grandfather, John Motley Morehead, was governor of North Carolina and the owner of the Blandwood Estate. Her younger brother, John Motley Morehead III, was a founder of Union Carbide and the United States Ambassador to Sweden in the early 1930s. She grew up in the family home, a large brick mansion built by her grandfather, that overlooked the family's milling operations in Spray.

Lily Morehead attended Peace Institute, a Presbyterian girls' school in Raleigh, North Carolina.

== Career ==
After the outbreak of World War I, Mebane became the Rockingham County Committee Chairwoman of the North Carolina Division of the Woman's Committee of the Council of National Defense. In 1918, she joined the American Committee for Devastated France, providing aide in France. She left France and visited in the Balkans, before going to Romania to continue her relief efforts. While working in Romania, she befriended Slavko Grujić and Queen Marie of Romania. Queen Marie gave Mebane a traditional embroidered "peasant" costume from her personal collection. "The queen deeply deplored the loss of the exquisitely spun fabrics, the bright-hued embroideries and the other hand work that was peculiarly the work of the Roumanian peasants," she wrote of their acquaintance and a friendship began that lasted until the Queen's death in 1938.

In 1922, she was awarded the Cross of Mercy by the King of Serbia for her "support of the sick, wounded, prisoners of war, refugees, children of the men killed in the war, and aged war mothers." She was also made Chevalier de la Légion d'honneur by the French government after the war.

Mebane and her husband were registered members of the Conference for Education in the South. In 1930 she organized the first public library in Rockingham County. In 1930, she was considered the "first woman ever to seek public office in Rockingham County" when she filed as a candidate. In 1931, Lily Morehead Mebane was elected to the North Carolina state legislature. She served two terms, after being re-elected in 1933, and chaired the Committee on Public Welfare in the state house of representatives. As a house representative, she advocated for legislation affecting state roads, divorce laws, education, child labor laws and pensions for Confederate veterans and war widows. Due to her life in public service, she was dubbed the "First Lady of Rockingham County."

In 1934, Mebane ran an unsuccessful campaign for a U.S. Congressional seat. She was unanimously endorsed by both the North Carolina House of Representatives and the North Carolina Senate to succeed her brother as the American Minister to Sweden. Had she been selected, Mebane would have been the first American woman ambassador to Sweden. Ultimately, President Franklin D. Roosevelt did not appoint her to the position.

== Personal life ==
Lily Morehead married Benjamin Franklin "Frank" Mebane Jr., her distant cousin, in 1893. Frank Mebane was a textile industry executive with her father. In 1935, Mebane and her husband were presented at the Court of Saint James, where they met King George V and Queen Mary. She was widowed when Frank died suddenly in 1926, while she was in England. On his death, she inherited his entire estate, estimated to be worth $2,000,000. She died in 1943, aged 74 years. Her diary and other notes are archived in the Morehead-Mebane Collection at Rockingham Community College, which also holds a parasol belonging to Lily Morehead Mebane. Ten years after her death, Rockingham County celebrated "Lily Morehead Mebane Day" to recognize her founding of the county library system.

The Morehead-Mebane House in Eden, North Carolina, which she renamed "As You Like It", was razed following a fire in the 1970s. There is a stained-glass window at St. Luke's Episcopal Church in Eden, given by Lily Morehead Mebane in memory of her mother.

== Works cited ==
- Richman, Barak D. (2007). "The King of Rockingham County and the Original Bridge to Nowhere". Contracts Stories. Foundation Press. ISBN 978-1-58778-721-8.
