= John Motley Morehead III =

American chemist, politician and diplomat

United States Minister to Sweden
- In office January 22, 1930 – March 31, 1933
- President: Herbert Hoover
- Preceded by: Leland Harrison
- Succeeded by: Laurence A. Steinhardt

Mayor of Rye
- In office 1925–1930

Personal details
- Born: November 3, 1870 Spray, North Carolina, U.S.
- Died: January 3, 1965 (aged 94) Rye, New York, U.S.
- Party: Republican
- Spouse: Genevieve Margaret Birkhoff
- Relations: Lily Morehead Mebane (sister)
- Parent: James Turner Morehead (father)
- Education: University of North Carolina at Chapel Hill
- Occupation: Chemist, entrepreneur

Military service
- Allegiance: United States
- Branch/service: United States Army; United States Army Reserve
- Rank: Colonel
- Battles/wars: World War I

John Motley Morehead III (November 3, 1870 – January 7, 1965) was an American chemist, politician, and diplomat. As a chemist, his work provided much of the foundation for the business of Union Carbide Corporation. The Union Carbide and Carbon Corporation was formed in 1917 from the merger of the former Union Carbide founded in 1898 by Morehead's father; and the National Carbon Company founded in 1886. He was a noted philanthropist who made major gifts to his alma mater, the University of North Carolina at Chapel Hill. He also served as mayor of Rye, New York and United States Ambassador to Sweden.

== Early life ==
Morehead came from an illustrious North Carolina family: his father was James Turner Morehead; his grandparents, John Motley Morehead and Ann Eliza Lindsay Morehead, served as Governor and First Lady of North Carolina. His sister, Lily Morehead Mebane, was decorated by the governments of France and Serbia for her relief work after World War I; she later served two terms in the North Carolina state legislature. Direct descendants through the paternal line of James Turner Morehead include W. Harris Nelson and William H.M. Nelson III. Non-lineal descendants include Jean Motley Morehead Larkin and John L. Morehead.

Morehead graduated from UNC-Chapel Hill in 1891 and was a member of Sigma Alpha Epsilon fraternity.

== Career ==
One of his notable early scientific discoveries was the development of an economical process for the manufacture of calcium carbide. He was also an authority on the analysis of gases, having invented a device for the purpose and written a book on the subject.

One of Morehead's particular interests was in providing financial assistance to students attending UNC Chapel Hill. To that end he endowed the John Motley Morehead Foundation, which each year awards undergraduate scholarships covering the full cost of attendance at UNC Chapel Hill to applicants chosen through an extensive and competitive screening process. The Morehead-Cain Scholarship is the oldest merit-based scholarship in the United States.

During the First World War, Morehead served as a major in the United States Army; he later became a colonel in the United States Army Reserve. From 1925 to 1930, Morehead served as the mayor of Rye, New York, and also gave money for the establishment of a new city hall; his nomination as minister to Sweden, from which he served from 1930 to 1933, came during his mayoralty.

== Personal life ==
Morehead married Genevieve Margaret Birkhoff. A few years after her death, he married Leila Duckworth Houghton. He had no children. He devoted his considerable fortune to philanthropy, especially to the benefit of UNC-Chapel Hill. With a college classmate and fraternity brother, Rufus Lenoir Patterson, he donated the Morehead-Patterson Bell Tower on the campus. He also gave the University the Morehead Planetarium, later renamed the Morehead Planetarium and Science Center.

=== Honors and legacy ===
He was awarded the North Carolina Award, the highest civilian award bestowed by the U.S. state of North Carolina in the category of Public Service in 1964.

There is a section of Interstate 40 named after him, called the John Motley Morehead III Freeway, that passes through Chapel Hill, North Carolina and most of the eastern end of Orange County.

In 1958, John Motley Morehead High School in Eden, North Carolina was named for him.

Preceded by Leland Harrison	United States Ambassador to Sweden; 1930 -1933	Succeeded by Laurence A. Steinhardt
