= John Sappington =

American physician (1776–1856)

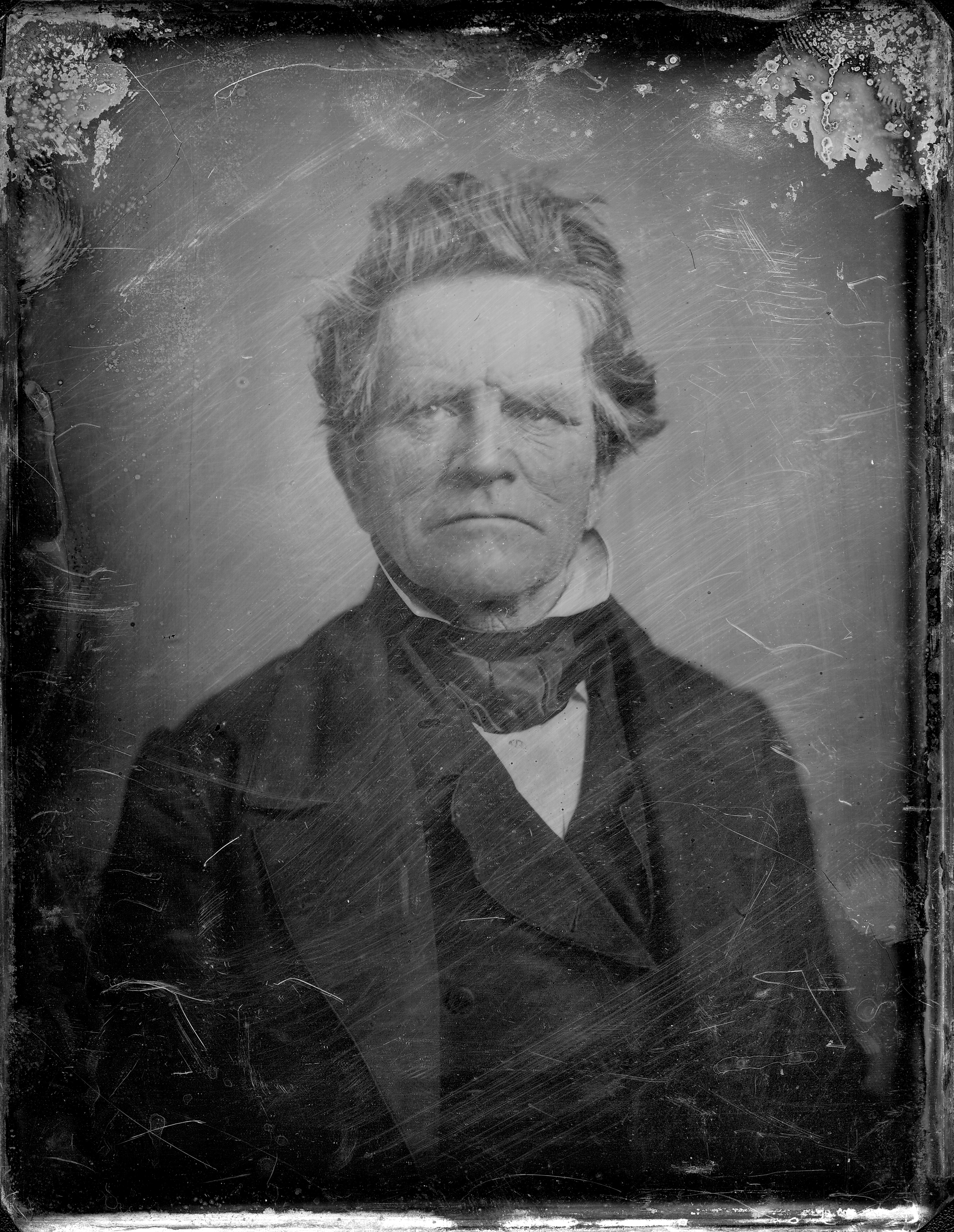
Portrait of John Sappington

John S. Sappington (1776-1856) was an American medical doctor known for developing a quinine pill to treat malarial and other fever diseases in the Missouri and Mississippi valleys, where the disease was widespread. He later used the pill to prevent malaria. Because he both manufactured and sold "Dr. Sappington's Anti-Fever Pills", he became wealthy from his bestseller.

From Maryland and Tennessee, Sappington settled in Missouri after completing medical training and getting married. He married Jane Breathitt, a sister of future Kentucky governor John Breathitt and two other politically connected brothers. As an early pioneer near Arrow Rock, Missouri, Sappington established several businesses to earn money to acquire land. He eventually acquired thousands of acres and became a major planter and slaveholder in the state. In furtherance of his work on treating malarial fever, he wrote The Theory and Treatment of Fevers, (1844), the first medical book printed in Missouri and among the first books published west of the Mississippi River. He imported cinchona bark from Peru, and manufactured and sold quinine pills to treat malaria and other fevers common to the area. His company was eventually a national one.

== Personal life ==
John Sappington was born in 1776 to Dr. Mark and Rebecca Sappington in Havre de Grace, Maryland. The family moved to Nashville, Tennessee in 1785, following a paternal brother who had just been appointed as a justice in the new town. John and two of his three brothers all grew up studying medicine under the guidance of their father, learning to become physicians. The third brother became a merchant.

Sappington married Jane Breathitt, whom he met in Kentucky. Several of her brothers became politically successful: John Breathitt was later the 11th Governor of Kentucky; George Breathitt became the private secretary of President Andrew Johnson; and James Breathitt, a future Commonwealth's Attorney for Kentucky.

The young couple settled in nearby Franklin, Tennessee, also in the Middle District of the state, where Sappington began his independent practice of medicine. While living in Franklin, Sappington became close friends with Thomas Hart Benton, an important political figure who later moved to Missouri. In 1817, following the advice and a substantial loan from Benton, Sappington and his family moved to central Missouri, first settling in Howard County. He used the loan to invest in land in neighboring Saline County, and two years later settled near Arrow Rock and the Missouri River.

The couple had a total of nine children together, two boys: Erasmus Darwin (1809-1858) and William B.; and seven girls: including Mary, Lavinia, Jane, Louisa and Elizabeth. The two brothers both married daughters of their maternal uncle John Breathitt, a governor of Kentucky, and his wife. At least four of the Sappington daughters married men who became politicians in Missouri; two sons-in-law served as future governors of Missouri.

== Career ==
Initially John Sappington provided medical services, was a financial lender, and imported and exported goods to the Missouri area. By 1824 he established Pearson and Sappington, a store in nearby Jonesborough (now Napton, Missouri), in part supplying traders and emigrants on the Santa Fe Trail, which had a terminus nearby. He established another store in Arrow Rock. In addition to selling goods, they loaned money, processed salt, and also milled lumber. He exported cotton and lumber. These enterprises and his acquisition of large amounts of inexpensive land added to his influence in Saline County, Missouri, part of what was known as the Little Dixie area. Most of its early settlers were from Virginia, Kentucky and Tennessee, strongly influencing the culture. Sappington acquired thousands of acres and became a major planter and slaveholder.

Once he had achieved financial success, Sappington began to conduct research in his medical practice. He focused on testing ways to use the bark of the cinchona tree from Peru, the substance used to create quinine. Quinine had been used to treat malaria in South America and Europe since the 17th century, carried to major European cities by Jesuit missionaries from Lima. They had learned of the bark's use to treat fever from the indigenous Quechua people. In that era, quinine powder, which had a bitter taste, was typically mixed with wine or other drink to make it palatable. It became used in Seville, Rome and London, among other places.

Malaria, scarlet fever, yellow fever, and influenza, were widespread diseases in the lowlands of the Missouri and Mississippi valleys. Their methods of transmission were not known. But Sappington developed a pill using quinine to treat the associated fevers. Beginning in 1832 he marketed these as "Dr. Sappington's Anti-Fever Pills," an early proprietary/patent medicine. Gradually he also instructed some of his relatives and salesmen to take the pills to prevent malaria. Soon the pills were in demand for treatment of malaria across the country, especially in the South. In addition, traders and emigrants on the Santa Fe Trail, which head was near Arrow Rock, purchased the pills for their long trips south and west.

This treatment was considered controversial, as most physicians were still treating malaria by bloodletting the patient and administering calomel. In addition, people had to use the quinine pills at the right dosage to prevent serious side effects. The pill remained in high demand, however, and Sappington increased his wealth by these sales.

After Sappington published the formula in his medical treatise, Theory and Treatment of Fevers (1844), many other physicians began to develop their own anti-malaria pills. His was the first medical book to be printed in Missouri and one of the first books to be published west of the Mississippi. Sappington is often regarded as the first physician in the United States to successfully and effectively use quinine to treat and prevent malaria.

== Extended family ==
Sappington's influence and his wife's connections likely aided the political careers of two of their sons-in-law, Meredith Miles Marmaduke, who married daughter Lavinia in 1826; and Claiborne Fox Jackson, who in 1831 married Jane Breathitt Sappington (named for her mother). She died a few months later. After serving in the Black Hawk War, Jackson married her sister Louisa in 1833. He also worked with his father-in-law and one of Louisa's brothers in his quinine business. After Louisa died in 1838, followed by their infant, later that year Jackson married Elizabeth Sappington (named for her maternal grandmother), a third daughter of the family. Jackson was very active in politics in central Missouri, serving for 12 years in the state house.

Sappington gave work to both Marmaduke and Jackson early in their careers, in his family businesses. Both men later served as governors of Missouri. One of Marmaduke's sons, John Sappington Marmaduke, also became a politician and was elected in 1884 as governor of Missouri, serving a single two-year term.
