= John Breathitt =

11th Governor of Kentucky

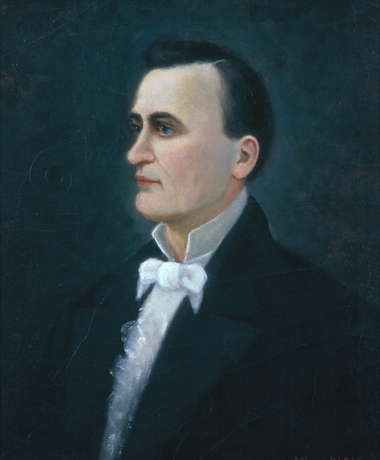

11th Governor of Kentucky
- In office September 4, 1832 – February 21, 1834
- Lieutenant: James T. Morehead
- Preceded by: Thomas Metcalfe
- Succeeded by: James T. Morehead

9th Lieutenant Governor of Kentucky
- In office August 26, 1828 – September 4, 1832
- Governor: Thomas Metcalfe
- Preceded by: Robert B. McAfee
- Succeeded by: James T. Morehead

Member of the Kentucky House of Representatives from Logan County
- In office 1811–1815

Personal details
- Born: September 9, 1786 Henry County, Virginia, U.S.
- Died: February 21, 1834 (aged 47) Frankfort, Kentucky, U.S.
- Party: Democratic
- Spouse(s): Caroline Whitaker; Susannah M. Harris
- Occupation: Surveyor, Teacher
- Profession: Lawyer

John Breathitt (September 9, 1786 – February 21, 1834) was an American politician and lawyer who was the 11th governor of Kentucky. He was the first Democrat to hold this office and was the second Kentucky governor to die in office. Shortly after his death, Breathitt County, Kentucky was organized and named in his honor.

Early in life, Breathitt was appointed a deputy surveyor in Illinois Territory. On his return to Kentucky, he taught at a country school. Through investments, he amassed enough wealth to live on while he studied law ("read the law") with Judge Caleb Wallace. In 1811, Breathitt was elected to the first of several terms in the Kentucky House of Representatives. He was the Democratic nominee for lieutenant governor in 1828. Although his running mate William T. Barry lost the office of governor to Thomas Metcalfe, Breathitt defeated his opponent for lieutenant governor.

During his term as lieutenant governor, Breathitt was one of several proposed candidates to succeed John Rowan in the United States Senate. The General Assembly deadlocked over the appointment and the seat went unfilled until the Assembly's next term. In the next gubernatorial election in 1832, Breathitt was nominated by the Democrats for governor. Breathitt won, but James Turner Morehead, the Whig candidate for lieutenant governor, defeated Breathitt's running mate. Initially, Breathitt enjoyed popularity for his public condemnation of John C. Calhoun's doctrine of nullification, but he struggled in state politics because the Whigs controlled the legislature. He died in office of tuberculosis on February 21, 1834.

== Early life ==
John Breathitt was born near New London, Henry County, Virginia on September 9, 1786. He was the eldest of five sons and four daughters born to William and Elizabeth (Whitsett) Breathitt. William Breathitt had immigrated to Maryland from Scotland, then settled in Virginia. Elizabeth was of English ancestry.

Two younger brothers later also became active in politics: George Breathitt served as a private secretary to President Andrew Jackson. James Breathitt became Commonwealth's Attorney for the state of Kentucky.

Their sister Jane Breathitt married Dr. John Sappington from Nashville, Tennessee, and the couple moved to central Missouri territory in 1817. There Sappington developed businesses, and then acquired land and slaves, becoming politically influential in Saline County. But he became nationally known for his development of a patent medicine: quinine pills to treat malaria and other fevers, which were widespread in the Missouri and Mississippi valleys. He manufactured and sold the pills, which became national bestsellers. Two of the Sappington sons-in-law became governors of Missouri, as did one of his and Jane's grandsons. (Erasmus D Sappington (1809–1858) married Penelope Breathitt (1823–1904) daughter of Kentucky Governor John Breathitt. Meredith Marmaduke Married Lavinia Sappington, the daughter of Dr. John and Jane Sappington. Claiborne Fox Jackson married Jane Breathitt Sappington, daughter of Dr. John Sappington)

Breathitt was educated at home and in the few public schools of his native state. His family moved to Logan County, Kentucky in 1800, where he continued his education. In early adulthood, he was appointed as a deputy surveyor in Illinois Territory. He returned to Kentucky, where he taught in a country school. He invested his income in land purchases, and shortly amassed enough wealth to sustain him for a few years. He studied or read law under Judge Caleb Wallace. He was admitted to the bar of Russellville, Kentucky in 1810 and opened his practice there.

In 1812, Breathitt married Caroline Whitaker of Logan County. The couple had a son and a daughter together. After Caroline died, Breathitt married Susan M. Harris of Chesterfield County, Virginia. Breathitt had another daughter by his second wife. Although Breathitt died at age 47, he had survived both of his wives.

== Political career ==
Breathitt was elected to represent Logan County in the Kentucky House of Representatives in 1811, and was re-elected every year until 1815. In the gubernatorial election of 1828, the Democrats chose William T. Barry as their candidate for governor. Initially, they offered the nomination for lieutenant governor to Judge John P. Oldham, but Oldham declined, and Breathitt was chosen as his replacement. Barry lost the governorship to National Republican Thomas Metcalfe, but Breathitt defeated Metcalfe's running mate Joseph R. Underwood by more than 1,000 votes.

As lieutenant governor, Breathitt promoted the creation of public schools in the state. On December 31, 1829, he was elected president of the Kentucky Educational Society, whose stated mission was to

"promote improvement and diffusion of popular education by the circulation of information, by enlisting the pulpit and the press, by procuring the delivery of popular addresses on the subject on the 4th day of July, and in different neighborhoods, and by other means that may be found practicable."

In 1833, Breathitt became president of the Kentucky Common School Society.

In 1831, Breathitt was one of several candidates put before the General Assembly to succeed John Rowan in the United States Senate. He received 66 of 137 votes, 3 votes short of a majority. Other unsuccessful nominees included John J. Crittenden (68 votes), Richard Mentor Johnson (64 votes), and Charles A. Wickliffe (49 votes). After 15 ballots, the Assembly was unable to select a nominee, and postponed the matter until the next session. At that session, the Assembly chose Henry Clay to fill the seat.

=== Governor of Kentucky ===
In 1832, the Democrats selected Breathitt and Benjamin Taylor as their candidates for governor and lieutenant governor, respectively. They faced a Whig (formerly National Republican) ticket of Richard Aylett Buckner and James Turner Morehead. Buckner was hurt by his highly religious ideals, including opposition to handling mail on Sunday, and failed to garner the support of some of his own party's newspapers. Breathitt defeated Buckner by a small margin, but Morehead defeated Taylor, Breathitt's little-known running mate.

Breathitt's election marked the first time a Democrat was elected to the governorship of Kentucky. The election was marred by fraud, however. In Oldham County, the number of votes tallied represented 162.9% of the eligible voters in the county, and these votes were recorded as two-to-one in favor of Breathitt. Most Kentuckians were more concerned about the upcoming presidential election, hoping Whig and native son Henry Clay would defeat Democrat Andrew Jackson. Because of this leaning, voters elected Whig candidates for most of the other state offices.

Early in his term, Breathitt won favor from both Whigs and Democrats by opposing South Carolina's actions during the Nullification Crisis. Following Breathitt's lead, the state legislature passed resolutions condemning the doctrine of nullification on February 2, 1833. This action was particularly significant because John C. Calhoun's justification for nullification was largely based on the 1799 Kentucky Resolutions.

Breathitt did not fare as well in state politics. He ardently supported Jacksonian principles, and wielded his veto against bills critical of President Jackson's land policy. He supported Jackson's desire to dissolve the Second Bank of the United States. Instead, he favored opening a number of state banks but, faced with a Whig majority in the legislature, he succeeded only in chartering the Louisville Bank of Kentucky. He also favored completion of the Lexington and Ohio Railroad to improve infrastructure and access to markets. He supported a $300,000 loan from the state Board of Internal Improvements for that purpose. In 1833, a loan for half the amount was approved, resulting in the railroad not being completed until 1851.

Breathitt was part of the temperance movement in Kentucky. In an 1832 address, he blamed consumption of alcohol for the high murder rate in the state. When the Kentucky Legislative Temperance Society was formed at a meeting in the state house on January 13, 1834, Breathitt was chosen as its president and Lieutenant Governor Morehead served as one of five vice-presidents.

Breathitt died in office of tuberculosis in the governor's mansion in Frankfort on February 21, 1834. He was the second sitting governor of Kentucky to die in office. Originally buried in the Breathitt family cemetery, he was later re-interred at Maple Grove Cemetery in Russellville. Breathitt County, Kentucky was formed in 1839 and named in his honor. On March 5, 1872, the Kentucky General Assembly resolved to erect a monument over Breathitt's grave in Russellville.

Party political offices
Preceded by William T. Barry	Democratic nominee for Governor of Kentucky; 1832	Succeeded by Matthews Flournoy
Political offices
Preceded by Robert B. McAfee	Lieutenant Governor of Kentucky; 1828–1832	Succeeded by James T. Morehead
Preceded by Thomas Metcalfe	Governor of Kentucky; 1832–1834	Succeeded by James T. Morehead
