= Ann Eliza Lindsay Morehead =

First Lady of North Carolina (1841–1845)

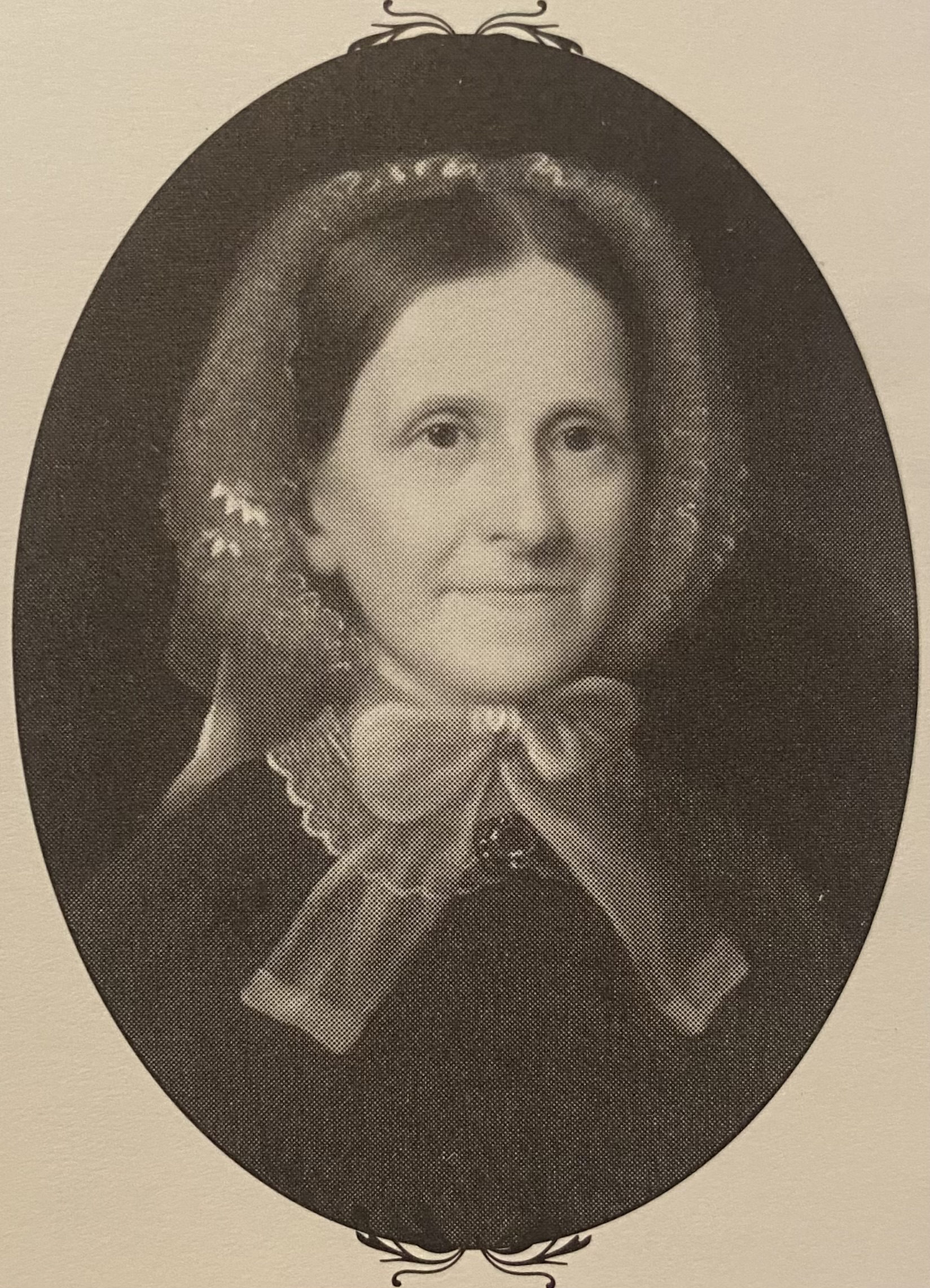

First Lady of North Carolina
- In office January 1, 1841 – January 1, 1845
- Governor: John Motley Morehead
- Preceded by: Elizabeth Henry Haywood Dudley
- Succeeded by: Susannah Sarah Washington Graham

Personal details
- Born: Ann Eliza Lindsay; October 14, 1804 Guilford County, North Carolina, U.S.
- Died: July 29, 1868 (aged 63) Greensboro, North Carolina, U.S.
- Resting place: First Presbyterian Church Cemetery
- Spouse: John Motley Morehead
- Children: 8 (including James)
- Relatives: Robert Lindsay (grandfather)

Ann Eliza Lindsay Morehead (October 14, 1804 – July 29, 1868) was an American political hostess and slaveowner who, as the wife of Governor John Motley Morehead, served as First Lady of North Carolina from 1841 to 1845. She and her husband owned Blandwood, an estate in Greensboro. As her husband was often traveling for his political career, management of the estate was her responsibility. Although she was critical of the institution of slavery and opposed her husband's personal investment in slaves, the Morehead family depended on enslaved labor at Blandwood.

== Early life and family ==
Morehead was born Ann Eliza Lindsay on October 14, 1804, in Guilford County, North Carolina, to Colonel Robert Lindsay Jr. and Letitia Harper Lindsay. She grew up in Martinville in a community of abolitionist Quakers. She came from a wealthy and cultured family. Her father died in 1818 and her mother married a second time to Henry Humphreys, Esquire. She was a granddaughter of the American Revolutionary War veteran Captain Robert Lindsay, who sat in the North Carolina General Assembly of 1777 and owned a 2,000-acre plantation along the Deep River.

She was likely educated at the Salisbury Academy, studying arithmetic and reading.

== Later life ==
She married the lawyer and politician John Motley Morehead on August 25, 1821. They had eight children: Letitia Harper, Mary Corinna, Ann Eliza, Mary Louise, Emma Victoria, John Lindsay, James Turner, and Eugene Lindsay. She valued women's education and ensured that her five daughters received proper schooling.

In 1825, the Moreheads settled at Blandwood, the estate of her stepfather, Henry Humphreys, in Greensboro. They purchased the estate in 1827. The year prior, in 1826, her husband was elected to represent Guilford County in the North Carolina House of Commons. Although she discouraged the enslavement and reportedly "always opposed her husband’s investing largely in slaves", Morehead managed the operations at Blandwood through slave labor. They had no overseer at Blandwood in 1840, so Morehead coordinated directly with thirty enslaved people including nine children under the age of ten. She and her husband enslaved sixteen people on the estate by 1860, including Hannah Jones, a house slave, and Tinnan Morehead, who tended the gardens and animals.

In 1841, upon her husband's election as the governor of North Carolina, the family relocated to the North Carolina Executive Mansion in Raleigh. Morehead accompanied her husband to political functions and social outings in New York City, Washington, D.C., and across North Carolina and Virginia. She served as the state's first lady from 1841 to 1856. Following his time as governor, her husband served in the Provisional Congress of the Confederate States during the American Civil War.

Morehead lived at Blandwood until her death on July 19, 1868, and was buried in the First Presbyterian Church of Greensboro's cemetery. She had been a parishioner at the church. Morehead suffered from poor health for several months prior to her death. In her will, Morehead bequeathed a walnut table and bedstead to her former slave, Hannah, and furniture and shoes to her former slave, Tinnan.
