= Morehead Planetarium and Science Center =

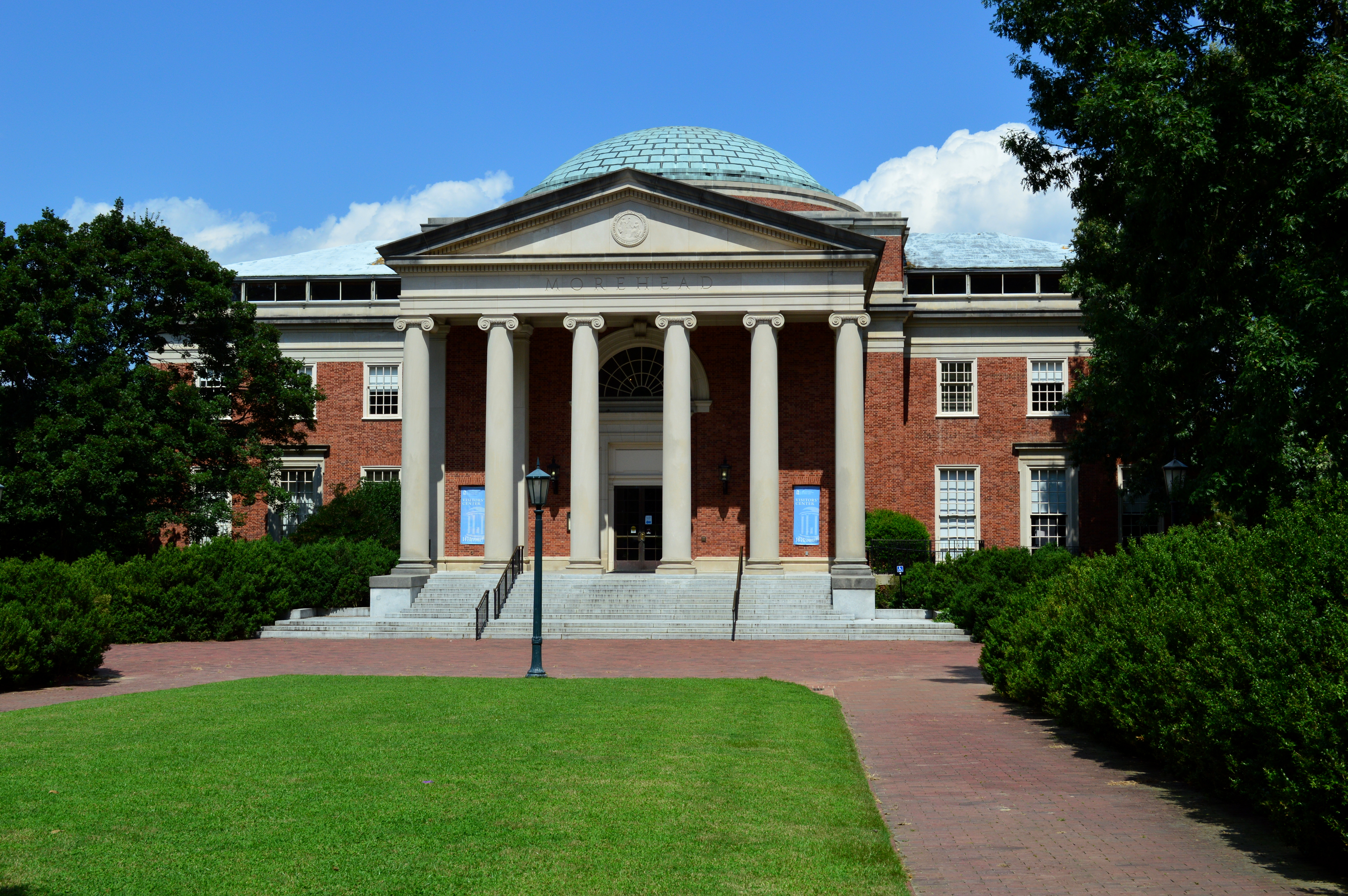

- Shown within North Carolina
- Established: May 10, 1949
- Location: Chapel Hill, North Carolina
- Coordinates: 35.91399°N 79.05025°W
- Type: Planetarium
- Director: Todd R. Boyette
- Public transit access: Chapel Hill Transit
- Website: http://www.moreheadplanetarium.org/

Morehead Planetarium and Science Center is a planetarium located on the campus of the University of North Carolina at Chapel Hill.

Opened in 1949, the dome theater in planetarium was used to train astronauts from the Gemini, Apollo, Mercury, Skylab, and Apollo-Soyuz missions in celestial navigation. Eleven of the twelve astronauts who walked on the Moon trained at Morehead Planetarium. Until the late 1990s, it contained one of the largest working Copernican orreries in the world.

The facility was donated to the university by alumnus John Motley Morehead III, who invested more than $3 million in its construction and outfitting. As a unit of the university, Morehead receives about one-third of its funding through state sources, one-third through ticket and gift sales, and one-third through gifts and grants.

== History ==
Morehead Planetarium opened on May 10, 1949 after seventeen months of construction. The first planetarium in the South, it was the eighth to be built in the United States. The planetarium was the first built on a university campus worldwide. Designed by Eggers & Higgins, the same architects who planned the Jefferson Memorial, the $3 million cost of its construction (approximately $40 million in today's dollars) made it the most expensive building in North Carolina at the time. Morehead Planetarium was officially dedicated during a ceremony held on May 10, 1949.

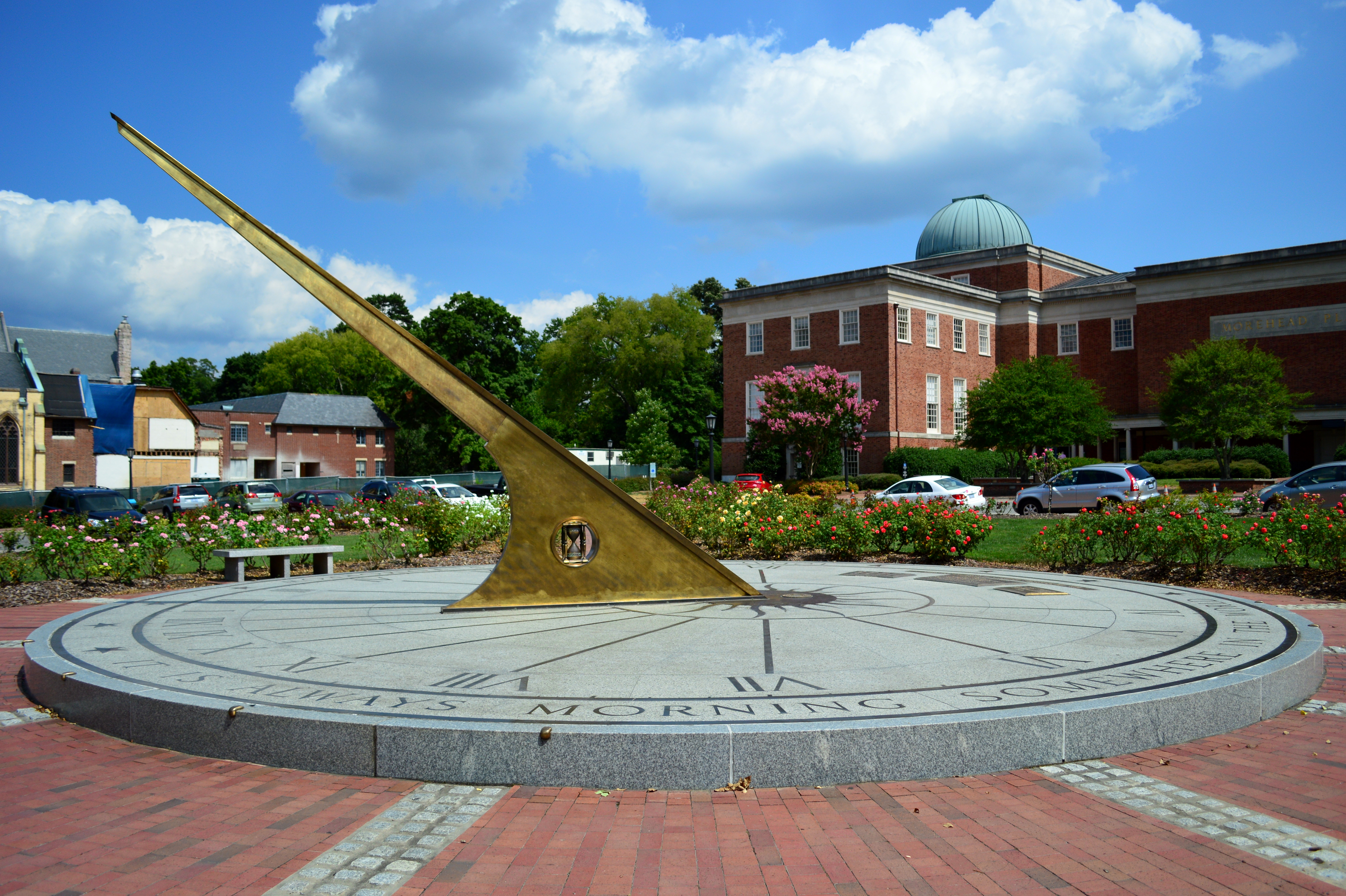
The sundial in front of Morehead Planetarium (2013)

Since Zeiss, the German optical firm that produced planetarium projectors, had lost most of its factories during World War II, there were very few projectors available at the time. Morehead had to travel to Sweden, where he had previously served as American ambassador, to purchase a Zeiss Model II to serve as the heart of North Carolina's new planetarium.

Let There Be Light was the planetarium's first show.

=== NASA ===
From 1959 through 1975 every astronaut in the Mercury, Gemini, Apollo, Skylab, and Apollo–Soyuz Test Project programs spent hours in celestial navigation training at the planetarium. Morehead technicians developed simplified replicas of flight modules and tools for use in the training, often from plywood or cardboard. A mockup simulating key parts of the Gemini capsule was constructed from plywood and mounted on a barber chair to enable changes in pitch and yaw. Several of these items are on display at the planetarium.

The first astronaut to train at Morehead was Neil Armstrong, in March 1964. He returned in the months before the 1969 launch of Apollo 11, spending a total of 20 days at Morehead over 11 training sessions, more than any other astronaut. Astronauts commented that the "large dome" was "highly realistic", calling the facility "superb".

The celestial navigation training received at Morehead may have helped save astronauts' lives on occasion. Gordon Cooper used his training to make the most-accurate landing of Project Mercury after a power failure affected navigational systems. Astronauts aboard Apollo 12 called upon that training after their Saturn V rocket was hit by lightning twice during ascent, knocking spacecraft systems offline and requiring them to configure navigation systems based on fixes taken manually.

Astronauts enjoyed soft drinks, cookies and other snacks during their intense hours-long training session, leading planetarium employees to create the code name "cookie time" to refer to the training sessions. Occasionally, word of the sessions leaked out and noted clothing designer and Chapel Hill native Alexander Julian recalls meeting Mercury Astronauts during a visit to the planetarium while in junior high.

==== Astronauts trained ====
Astronauts who trained at the planetarium include:

- Buzz Aldrin
- Joseph P. Allen
- William Anders
- Neil Armstrong
- Charles Bassett
- Alan Bean
- Frank Borman
- Vance D. Brand
- John S. Bull
- Scott Carpenter
- Gerald P. Carr
- Eugene Cernan
- Roger B. Chaffee
- Philip K. Chapman
- Michael Collins
- Pete Conrad
- Gordon Cooper
- Walter Cunningham
- Charles Duke
- Donn F. Eisele
- Anthony W. England
- Joe Engle
- Ronald E. Evans
- Theodore Freeman
- Edward Givens
- John Glenn
- Richard F. Gordon Jr.
- Gus Grissom
- Fred Haise
- Karl Gordon Henize
- James Irwin
- Joseph P. Kerwin
- William B. Lenoir
- Don L. Lind
- Anthony Llewellyn
- Jack R. Lousma
- Jim Lovell
- Ken Mattingly
- Bruce McCandless II
- James McDivitt
- Curt Michel
- Edgar Mitchell
- Story Musgrave
- Brian O'Leary
- Robert A. Parker
- William R. Pogue
- Stuart Roosa
- Wally Schirra
- Rusty Schweickart
- David Scott
- Elliot See
- Alan Shepard
- Deke Slayton
- Thomas P. Stafford
- Jack Swigert
- William E. Thornton
- Paul J. Weitz
- Ed White
- Clifton Williams
- Alfred M. Worden
- John Young

== Fulldome planetarium ==
Morehead's planetarium seats about 240 people, with a dome that is 68 feet (21 m) in diameter and 44 feet (13 m) tall. It currently has two different projection systems.

In February 2010, Morehead introduced its new fulldome digital video (FDV) projection system, the largest FDV installation in the southeastern United States. Funding for the new system was provided by GlaxoSmithKline, and the planetarium's star theater is now named the GlaxoSmithKline Fulldome Theater.

Morehead's historic star projector, a Carl Zeiss Model VI, was installed in 1969 and remained in limited use as of April 2011, primarily for field trip groups. This projector displays about 8,900 different stars on the dome overhead. The analog planetarium shows are a combined effort of the Zeiss projector, slide projectors and video projectors working together to form a multimedia experience. The projector was removed in August 2011. Planetarium officials hope to display at least a portion of the projector somewhere in the center.

== Exhibits ==
On February 23, 2007, Morehead opened its first interactive exhibit, Zoom In: Science at the Extremes. It features current science at the extremes of size and scale, including research done by UNC scientists.

The Ancient Carolinians opened on November 17, 2007. This exhibit explores the lives of the first people to live on the land now known as North Carolina, interpreting the use of 10,000-year-old artifacts from the Hardaway archaeological site. This exhibit is supported in part by the Alcoa Foundation, which donated the artifacts to the university. After January 1, 2009, the exhibit installation was removed so that The Ancient Carolinians could become Morehead's first traveling exhibit.

== Science stage ==
Morehead Planetarium and Science Center offers live, educator-led programs in its Science Stage. Science LIVE! shows present the foundations of science, on a variety of topics, through experiments and demonstrations that often involve volunteers from the audience.

== External programs ==
The DESTINY Traveling Science Learning Program, which was founded by UNC in 2000, became part of Morehead in 2006.

The PLANETS Portable Planetarium Program brings the fulldome planetarium experience to elementary schools that are too far from Morehead to plan a field trip to the center.

== Jupiter Fellowship ==
Each year, the Jupiter Committee (a volunteer group that assists in planning the Jupiter Ball fundraising gala for Morehead) awards the Jupiter Fellowship. This award goes to the student employee(s) who submits the best proposal for a Morehead program, activity or innovation. The fellowship funds the implementation of the proposal.

== Morehead Observatory ==
Morehead Observatory, located on the east end of the top floor of the Morehead building, houses a 24-inch (61 cm) Perkin-Elmer reflecting telescope operated by the UNC Physics and Astronomy Department. Faint object observing is still possible with narrow wavelength filters to block the city lights of Chapel Hill. The observatory supports research programs in bright star spectroscopy and optical counterparts of gamma ray bursts.

== See also ==
- North Carolina Science Festival
