= Blandwood Mansion and Gardens =

Historic house in North Carolina, United States

Coordinates: 36.069715°N 79.795783°W

- Blandwood
- U.S. National Register of Historic Places
- U.S. National Historic Landmark
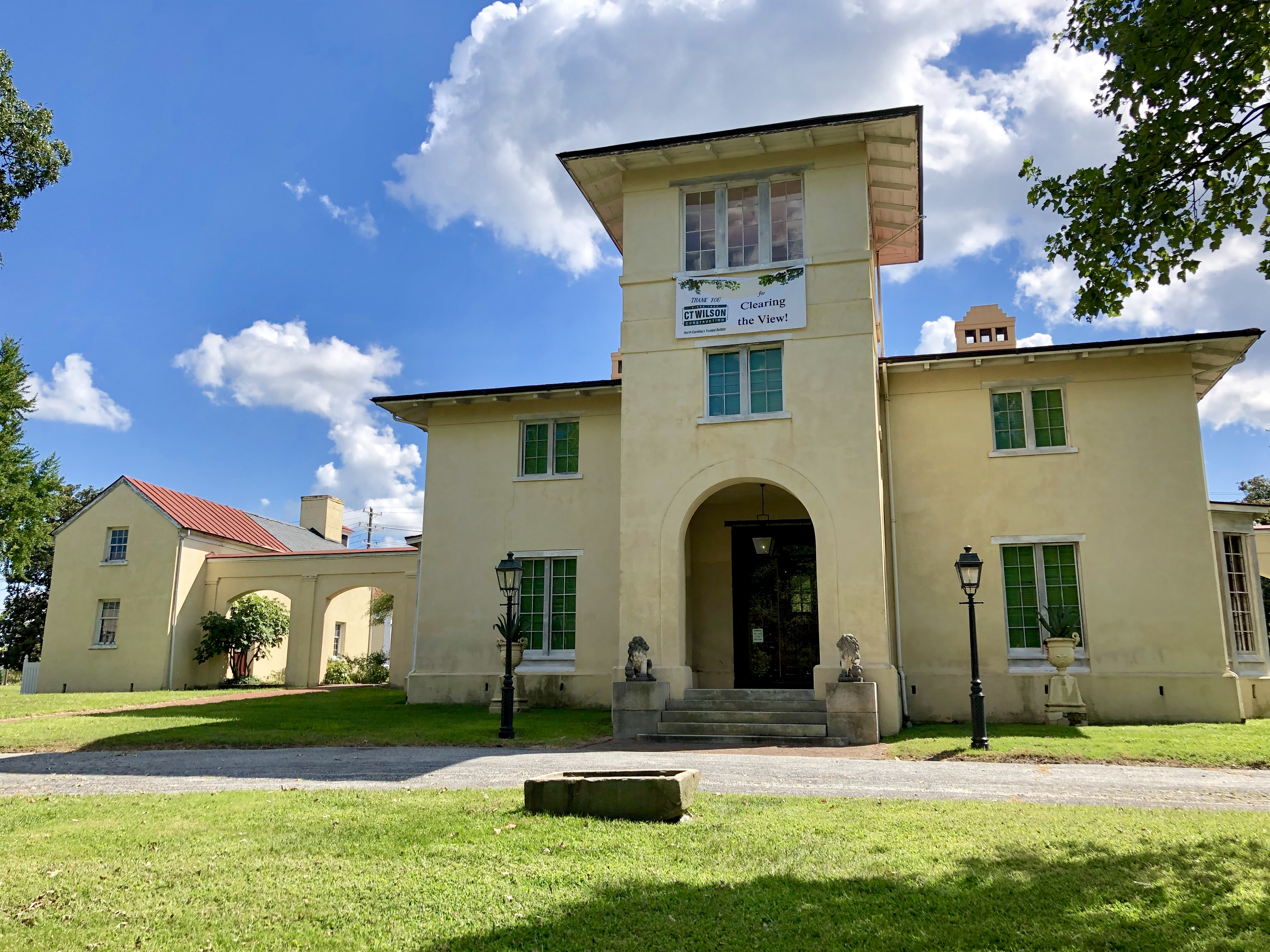
- A. J. Davis designed Tuscan Villa
- Location: 447 W. Washington St., Greensboro, NC
- Built: 1795, additions 1822 and 1844
- Architect: Alexander Jackson Davis
- Architectural style: Italianate
- NRHP reference No.: 70000455

Significant dates
- Added to NRHP: April 17, 1970
- Designated NHL: June 7, 1988

Blandwood Mansion is a historic house museum at 447 West Washington Street in Greensboro, North Carolina. Originally built as a four-room Federal style farmhouse in 1795, it was home to two-term North Carolina governor John Motley Morehead (1841–1844) under whose ownership it was transformed into its present appearance. It is believed to be the oldest extant example of the Italian Villa Style of architecture in the United States, and was designated a National Historic Landmark in 1988. In creating the design for Blandwood, architect Alexander Jackson Davis produced a popular prototype for American house designs in the Italianate style: a central tower projecting from the main facade. Saved from demolition in 1964 by preservation-minded Greensboro citizens, the house was opened as a museum in 1976 and remains open to the public today.

== History ==
=== Origins ===
Initially constructed as a two-story, four-room frame farmhouse in 1795, Blandwood likely took the name of its first occupant and builder, Charles Bland. Bland and his wife Catherine farmed the surrounding 100 acres until 1800, when the property was sold to Joseph Thornburg for his son Joseph Thornburg Jr. The property was purchased by industrialist Henry Humphreys in 1822 for $50. Humphreys founded the Mt. Hecla Cotton Mill in 1818, which was reconstituted in 1826 as the first steam-powered cotton mill in North Carolina.

Governor Morehead lived in the house from 1827 until his death in 1866. He purchased it from Humphreys, who was the stepfather of his wife, Ann Eliza Lindsay Morehead. As a political leader, Morehead hosted numerous intellectuals of the day including social activist Dorothea Dix and architect Alexander Jackson Davis. During the Civil War, the house served as quarters for Confederate General P. G. T. Beauregard, and after the fall of the Confederacy the house was temporary headquarters for Union Generals Jacob Dolson Cox and John Schofield. North Carolina Governor Zebulon B. Vance surrendered himself to Cox and Schofield in the main parlor of Blandwood on May 2, 1865.

Blandwood had two additions. The first in 1822 expanded the frame farmhouse from four to six rooms and continued the Federal architecture period details of the initial house. The second addition was extensive and designed in 1844 by New York City architect Alexander Jackson Davis. This addition more than doubled the square footage of the house within a "Tuscan Villa" style wing. The Davis addition makes Blandwood the oldest standing example of Tuscan Villa (a subtype of Italianate architecture) in the United States. Construction of the masonry expansion was executed by William and Joseph Conrad, building contractors from nearby Lexington, North Carolina The grounds of Blandwood were influenced by landscape architect Andrew Jackson Downing, who used an illustration of Blandwood in his publications to depict appropriate landscaping.

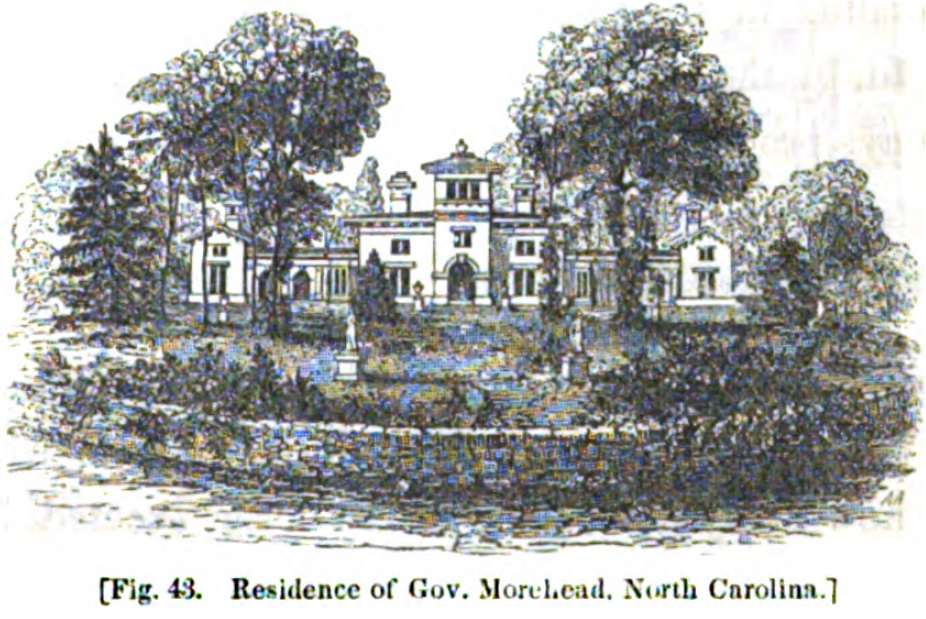

After Governor Morehead's death, the house was occupied by his youngest son Eugene until 1874. Eugene's sister and brother-in-law, Emma and Julius Gray, were the next occupants of the house. The couple resided in Blandwood with their six children. Julius Gray was a civic-minded businessman, banker, and founder of the Greensboro Chamber of Commerce. All members of the family died in the last decade of the nineteenth century except for the children of the eldest Gray daughter. The last members of the Morehead family to live in Blandwood left the house in 1900.

Blandwood and its surrounding property were sold to Colonel and Mrs. William H. Osborne in 1907 for use as a local franchise of the Keeley Institute. The original dependencies were destroyed and additions erected around the property. The property use as alcoholic treatment facility continued until it closed in 1961 at which time historians were beginning to understand the importance of nineteenth century architecture and the significance of works by Alexander Jackson Davis. Preservation efforts were initiated by Guilford College, but were picked up after Preservation Greensboro Incorporated was established in 1966.

== Slavery at Blandwood ==
The Morehead family did not administer Blandwood as a working plantation for cash crops. The house, located adjacent to the village of Greensborough during the antebellum period, took advantage of the convenience of nearby commercial merchants for supplies. As a town house, census data suggests a limited enslaved population living at Blandwood that was related to the operation of a large and affluent residence. Very little documentation exists on the enslaved people at Blandwood, including their names and ages. Scholars continue to research archaeological resources and seek primary historical references in order to build a better understanding of the period. Additional insights include John Motley Morehead's complex personal relationship to slavery, ranging from early political initiatives in support of Freedmen to his service to the Confederacy.

== Significance ==
The house is recognized by architectural historians as the "Embodiment of the antebellum 'spirit of improvement,'" in North Carolina, and the "most important building in Greensboro."

Blandwood is the oldest building on original foundations in the city of Greensboro (1795). Originally located within a rural context, it is a remarkable survivor of urban development as the city grew around the house. Its primary national significance is its role as the earliest identified Tuscan Villa in the United States (1844). Architect A. J. Davis designed the building to resemble villas of Tuscany (though he never visited Italy) using wide overhanging eaves, low rooflines, casement windows, stucco-on-brick veneer, and most notably the tall prospect tower which dominated the facade. Davis adaptively reused the existing free-standing kitchen by expanding its size and matching it with a nearly identical building on the other side of the house, creating freestanding hyphen wings with arcades. The building is also a rare example of grand antebellum architecture in the western Piedmont - a territory that was characterized by small farms and a relatively small enslaved population.

The building was purchased reserved by Preservation Greensboro Incorporated, a citywide non-profit organization dedicated to historic preservation from Guilford College in 1966 for intended use as a museum. The nonprofit initiated a program of restoration, including paint analysis, archaeological investigation, a furnishings plan, reconstruction of dependencies, and restoration of surrounding gardens. Many items original to the house were returned by members of the Morehead family in the 1960s and 1970s. It was placed on the National Register of Historic Places in 1970, and recognized as a National Historic Landmark in 1988.

== Current events ==
The house and curtilage are owned by Preservation Greensboro Incorporated. Its 4-acre (16,000 m^{2}) grounds include an octagonal Carriage House restored in 1970 as a special events facility and gardens. Blandwood is open for tours and hosts of numerous musical events, weddings, bar/bat mitvahs, historical events, parties, picnics, tours, and school related activities throughout the year.

== See also ==
- List of National Historic Landmarks in North Carolina
- National Register of Historic Places listings in Guilford County, North Carolina

== Bibliography ==
- Lane, Mills (1993). Architecture of the Old South. ISBN 1-55859-044-7
- Peck, Amelia (1992). Alexander Jackson Davis, American Architect 1803–1892. Rizzoli. ISBN 0-8478-1484-X
