= John Buckner (burgess) =

Colonial planter and politician in Virginia

Member of the House of Burgesses for Gloucester County
- In office 1693–1694 Serving with James Ransone
- Preceded by: John Baylor
- Succeeded by: Moredecai Cooke
- In office 1682–1682
- Preceded by: John Armistead
- Succeeded by: Thomas Pate

Personal details
- Died: about 1695
- Children: Thomas, Richard, John, William, Elizabeth
- Occupation: attorney, planter, politician

John Buckner (probably born early 1630s, died about 1695) was a Virginia planter and politician who arranged for importation of the first printing press in the Colony of Virginia. He twice represented Gloucester County in the Virginia House of Burgesses.

== Early and family life ==
Probably born in England, his origins are controversial and have been the subject of numerous genealogies of varying degrees of reliability, including one by the notorious genealogical forger Gustave Anjou. Substantial amounts of forged material have been identified in some of these, as well as numerous errors. Both Berkshire and Oxfordshire of the day had substantial numbers of men with the Buckner surname.

John Buckner had immigrated to Virginia by the mid 1650s, perhaps occasionally traveling back to England for business or family reasons. His first known appearance in the colony was in 1654/5 when he witnessed a mortgage by Abraham Moone of Lancaster County, Virginia (probably in the area that through later boundary changes became "Old" Rappahannock County and then Essex County before finally becoming Caroline County). His son Thomas Buckner likely was at least educated and married in England and resided in St. Margaret's parish, Westminster near London for at least seven years. In 1694 Thomas Buckner received a legacy in the will of Virginia resident Edward Porteous (possibly a relative of Robert Porteous who served on the Governor's Council in 1715 when Thomas and his brother John Jr. both served as Gloucester County's burgesses and their brother Richard was the Clerk of the House of Burgesses).

== Career ==
By February 1665, John Buckner owned property in Gloucester County, which he expanded in the next 24 years to more than 26,000 acres in the watersheds of the Rappahannock and York Rivers. By November 1677, in addition to operating a plantation and acting as a merchant (whether he imported or simply sold slaves as well as tobacco locally is unclear), Buckner became the Gloucester County Clerk, and continued in that position until at least July 1693. He also became a vestryman and at times churchwarden for the middle and lower part of Petsworth Parish (one of four parishes in Gloucester County at the time, and whose church silver would be saved in Ware Parish Church after the Revolutionary War).

Gloucester County voters elected Buckner to represent them in both sessions of the House of Burgesses in 1682. At the end of the year he was one of the men to post a bond to guarantee the appearance of Robert Beverley before the General Court to face charges arising from the previous year's plant cutting riots.

Buckner brought the first printing press to Virginia and employed the state's first printer, William Nuthead. In 1683, he was called before Governor Thomas Culpeper and the colonial Council for "his presumption, in printing the acts of Assembly made in James Citty in November 1682, and several other papers, without lycence." Nuthead and Buckner were forbidden from printing anything further on a bond of £100 sterling, pending a decision about the permissibility of printing in the Colony. Not long after, the Council decided to absolutely forbid printing "upon any occasion whatsoever." Nuthead soon relocated to Maryland, and his wife Dinah Nuthead continued the printing business after his death. However, Virginia law continued to prevent printing until William Parks opened a branch of his Annapolis printing office in Williamsburg, Virginia in 1730.

Buckner (or his son of the same name) represented Gloucester County in the House of Burgesses again in 1693, and John Jr represented Gloucester County in 1715 and he or a relative represented York County in 1736.

== Death ==
John Buckner attended a Petsworth Parish vestry meeting on December 7, 1694, but missed the meeting of October 7, 1695. Buckner died before February 10, 1695/6, when an inventory of his estate in Essex County (including eight slaves) was filed, showing that he owned property in that county as well as Gloucester. However, many Gloucester County records were lost. Thomas Buckner also began serving as Petsworth parish churchwarden by October 14, 1696. John Buckner was survived by four known sons, William, Thomas, John, and Richard, all of whom would hold seats in the House of Burgesses. Thomas Buckner first represented Gloucester County as a burgess in 1698, the year when York County voters first selected his brother William to represent them. In the 1715 Assembly, Richard Buckner served as the burgesses' clerk while his brothers John and Thomas represented Gloucester county.
