= Aylette Buckner =

American politician

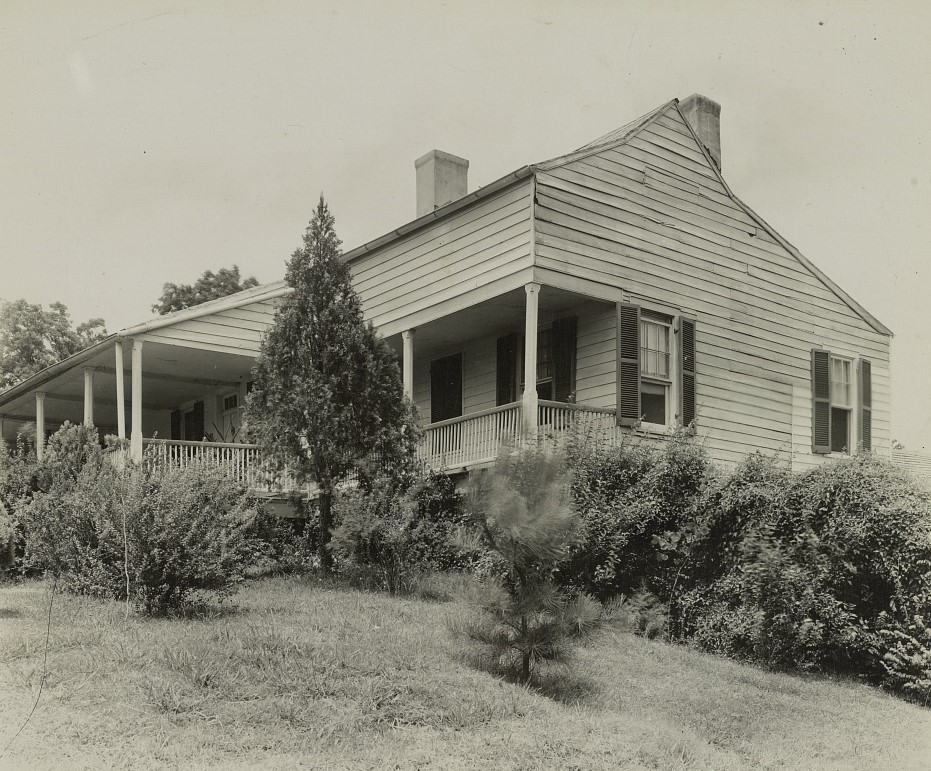
House Buckner owned before the Civil War, a Union Army hospital in the war

Aylette Buckner (July 21, 1806 – July 3, 1869) was Kentucky planter, lawyer and politician who served as United States representative from Kentucky. He was the father of Simon Bolivar Buckner, a Confederate general in the United States Civil War, who was pardoned for his role in that insurrection and later was elected Kentucky's governor.

== Early and family life ==
He was born in Greensburg, the county seat of then-vast Green County, Kentucky to the former Elizabeth Lewis Buckner and Richard Aylett Buckner, who also was a planter, lawyer and politician who served in the U.S. House of Representatives before his son. The Buckners were an old Virginia family, and several ancestors had held legislative or other offices within the Commonwealth, including as clerks of the House of Burgesses and burgesses representing Gloucester and other Tidewater Virginia and Piedmont counties before the American Revolutionary War. His grandfather whom he knew as a boy, also Aylett Buckner (spelling varied in that era), had served as major in the Fauquier County militia, then in the Virginia Line and received land grants in Kentucky in partial compensation that military service. Shortly after Kentucky was admitted as a state, the senior Aylett Buckner moved most of his family (including this man's father Richard Aylett Buckner Sr.) across the Cumberland Gap along what was then sometimes known as the Cumberland Trace into south central Kentucky. They settled in Green County, named for a Revolutionary War general and the sixteenth county created in what had become the new state, and which would in turn be subdivided and parts incorporated into other Kentucky counties, including Hart County, Kentucky, where this man would live, practice law and represent politically. Although not as prominent (nor prolific) as the Cabell family of Virginia or the Lee family of Virginia or the Burwell family of Virginia, many consider the Buckners to have been among the First Families of Virginia. Both branches of the Buckner family would intermarry with leading Kentucky families. Aylette Buckner's brothers included Richard Aylett Buckner Jr. (1810–1900) and Luther A. Buckner. His sister Elizabeth Robards Buckner married John Rowan Allen (1815–1877). Meanwhile, Aylette Buckner received a private education appropriate to his class. He attended the New Athens Seminary and later studied law. Complicating matters, he had a cousin, Aylette Hawes Buckner (1809–1867), who was also a lawyer and slaveowner in Green County, Kentucky.

Aylette Buckner married the former Emily Morehead. One of their sons, Simon Bolivar Buckner (1823–1914) pursued a military career, first with the U.S. Army, then as a Confederate general, before becoming Kentucky's governor.

== Career ==
He was admitted to the bar and began to practice in Greensburg, the Green County seat.

Buckner was a member of the Kentucky House of Representatives in 1842 and 1843. He was elected as a Whig to the Thirtieth Congress (March 4, 1847 – March 3, 1849) but was an unsuccessful candidate in 1848 for reelection to the Thirty-first Congress, a defeat attributed to his support for the anti-slavery Wilmot Proviso, a rarity among Southerners. After Congress, he moved to St. Louis, Missouri and continued the practice of his profession. Later, he returned to Lexington, Kentucky in 1864, where he died in 1869. He was buried at Lexington Cemetery.

U.S. House of Representatives
Preceded by Joshua F. Bell	Member of the U.S. House of Representatives from Kentucky's 4th congressional district March 4, 1847 – March 3, 1849	Succeeded by George Caldwell
