= Rockbridge Alum Springs Historic District =

Historic district in Virginia, United States

- U.S. National Register of Historic Places
- U.S. Historic district
- Virginia Landmarks Register
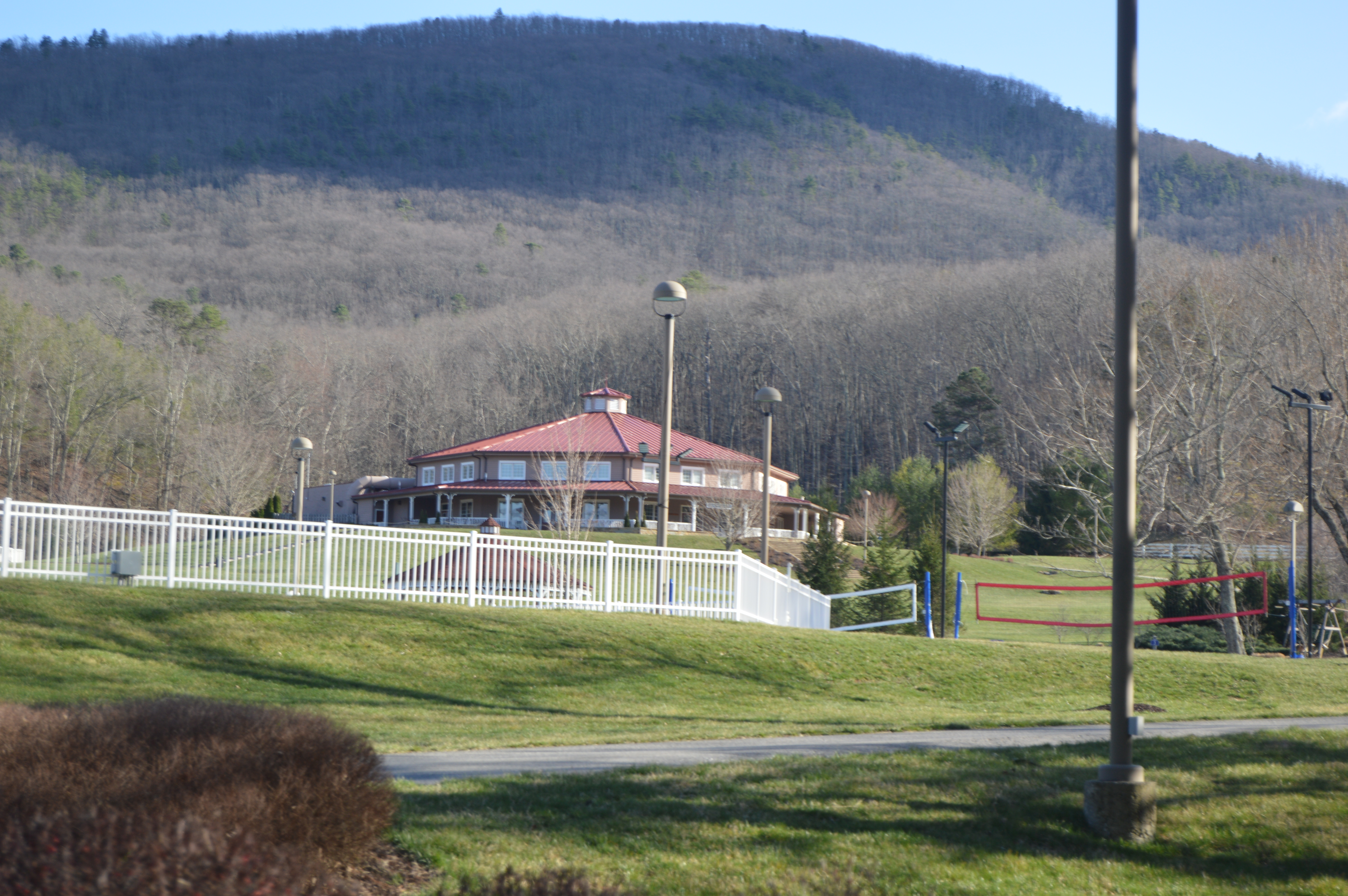
- Open lawns in the complex, with the camp dining hall in the distance

- Location within Virginia Location within the United States
- Location: Address Restricted, near California, Virginia
- Area: 40 acres (16 ha)
- Built: 1853
- Architectural style: Greek Revival, Gothic Revival
- NRHP reference No.: 88003204
- VLR No.: 081-0086

Significant dates
- Added to NRHP: January 19, 1989
- Designated VLR: April 21, 1987

Rockbridge Alum Springs Historic District, also known as Jordan Alum Springs, and now known as Rockbridge Alum Springs - A Young Life Camp, is a historic 19th-century resort complex and national historic district near California, Rockbridge County, Virginia, United States. The district encompasses 16 contributing buildings, 10 contributing sites, and 4 contributing structures dating primarily to the 1850s, and associated with the operations of the Rockbridge Alum Springs, a popular 19th- and early-20th century mountain resort. The buildings are the barroom, store/post office, Montgomery Hall, the Gothic Building, the Alum Springs Pavilion, two cottages of Baltimore Row, the Ladies Hotel, four cottages of Kentucky Row, Jordan's House, a servant's quarters, a slave quarters, and a storehouse. The remaining structures are a well, the stone spring chambers, gazebo, and the Jordan Alum Springs bandstand. The sites are primarily those of demolished cottages. It is one of the best-preserved antebellum springs resort complexes in Virginia. The resort remained in operation until 1941. It is currently owned and operated by Young Life, a non-denominational Christian youth organization. It has been operated as a year-round campground since 1992.

It was listed on the National Register of Historic Places in 1989.
