= John Motley Morehead =

American politician (1796–1866)

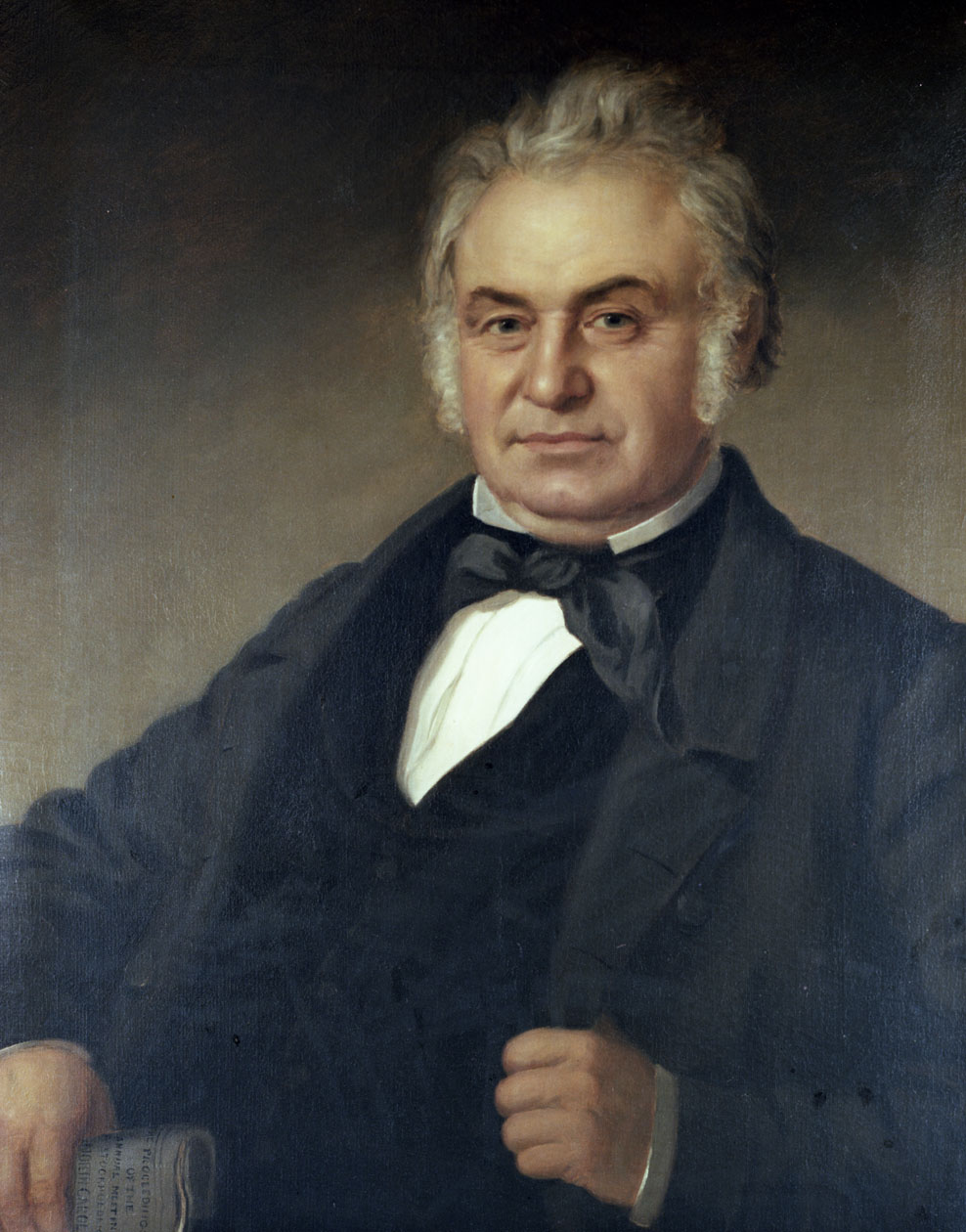

Representative of North Carolina to the Provisional Congress of the Confederate States
- In office 1861–1862
- President: Jefferson Davis

29th Governor of North Carolina
- In office January 1, 1841 – January 1, 1845
- Preceded by: Edward Bishop Dudley
- Succeeded by: William Alexander Graham

Member of the North Carolina General Assembly

Personal details
- Born: July 4, 1796 Pittsylvania County, Virginia, US
- Died: August 27, 1866 (aged 70) Rockbridge Springs, Virginia, US
- Party: Whig
- Spouse: Ann Eliza Lindsay
- Relations: James Turner Morehead (brother)
- Children: 8 (including James)
- Education: University of North Carolina at Chapel Hill
- Occupation: Lawyer

John Motley Morehead (July 4, 1796 – August 27, 1866) was an American lawyer and politician who became the 29th governor of the U.S. state of North Carolina (1841 to 1845). He became known as "the Father of Modern North Carolina."

== Early and family life ==
Born in Pittsylvania County, Virginia, Morehead was the son of Obedience (Motley) and John Morehead. His parents moved to Rockingham County, North Carolina when Morehead was two.

After a private education including private tutors around Greensboro, Morehead attended the University of North Carolina at Chapel Hill. There he became a member of the Dialectic and Philanthropic Societies, and graduated in 1817.

== Career ==
Morehead read law under Archibald Murphey and was admitted to the North Carolina bar in 1819. He practiced law in Wentworth, North Carolina. In 1821, Rockingham County voters first elected him to serve in the North Carolina House of Commons. Beginning in 1826, Guilford County voters twice elected Morehead to represent them in the North Carolina House of Commons. In 1835, Morehead was chosen to be a delegate to the state Constitutional Convention, where he advocated representation based on population (which benefitted western North Carolina because of its relatively few enslaved people).

Voters elected Morehead governor in 1840, and he became the first governor inaugurated in the new State Capitol. During his two gubernatorial terms, Morehead supported the new public school system, extending railroad lines, river and harbor improvements and constructing canals and turnpikes, but the Democrats in the state legislature passed few of those measures. During his final year, Morehead supported creation of a school for the deaf, which would be named in his honor.

After his term as governor ended in 1845, Morehead returned to his home, Blandwood, in Greensboro, North Carolina, designed by New York City architect Alexander Jackson Davis. There, Morehead entertained numerous politicians and personalities of the day, including Dorothea Dix.

Morehead helped raise private funds for a railroad line to accompany $2 million finally authorized by the legislature, which became the North Carolina Railroad. In 1854, Morehead became the first president and the railroad's terminus was named Morehead City, North Carolina in his honor in 1860. His successor at the railroad, Charles Frederick Fisher, however, endured significant criticism during the intervening years. Morehead also built a cotton mill in Leaksville, and served on the Board of Trustees of UNC, his alma mater.

Morehead returned to the North Carolina house in 1858. In 1861, he represented North Carolina at a conference to avoid war. With the failure of the conference and the secession of North Carolina, Morehead served in as the Representative to the Provisional Confederate Congress from North Carolina.

== Death ==
Morehead died at Rockbridge Springs, Virginia in 1866. He is buried in the Old First Presbyterian Church Cemetery located at the Greensboro Historical Museum in Greensboro.

== Legacy ==
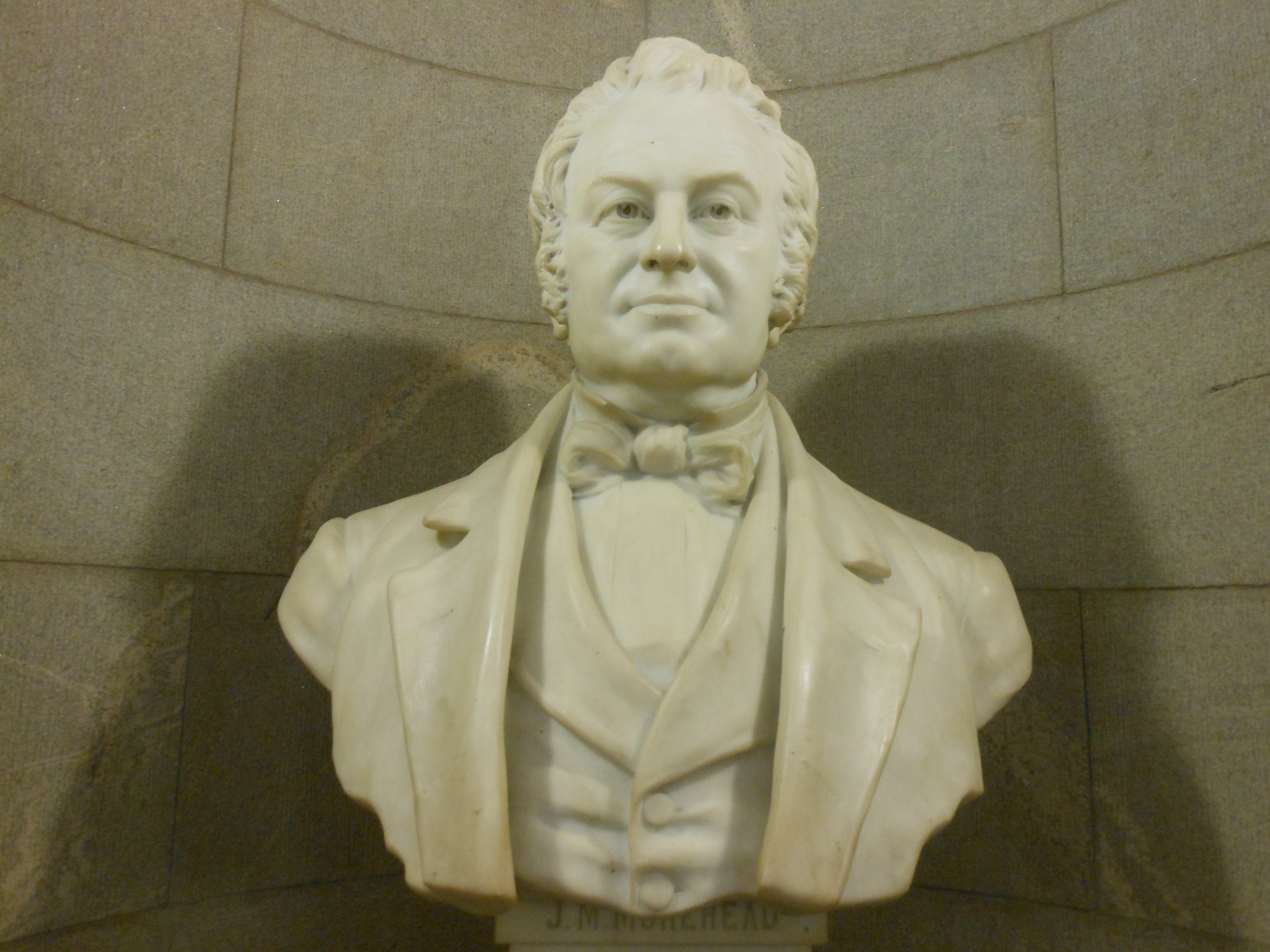
Marble bust of Morehead at the North Carolina State Capitol

His grandson, John Motley Morehead III (United States Ambassador to Sweden 1930–33), bequeathed to the University of North Carolina $130 million, commissioned the university's planetarium, and funded the John Motley Morehead Foundation. His granddaughter Lily Morehead Mebane was decorated by the governments of France and Serbia for her relief work after World War I; she later served two terms in the North Carolina state legislature. His great grandson Gordon Johnston was a recipient of the Medal of Honor. Governor Morehead School, a state school for the blind, is named after him.

He is the namesake of Morehead City, a major city in Eastern North Carolina.

Party political offices
Preceded by Edward Bishop Dudley	Whig nominee for Governor of North Carolina; 1840, 1842	Succeeded by William Alexander Graham
Political offices
Preceded by Edward Bishop Dudley	Governor of North Carolina; 1841–1845	Succeeded by William Alexander Graham
Confederate States House of Representatives
Preceded by none	Representative to the Provisional Confederate Congress from North Carolina; 1861	Succeeded by none
