= Richard Buckner (burgess) =

Colonial Virginian politician

Member of the House of Burgesses for Caroline County
- In office 1728–1733 Serving with John Martin
- Preceded by: position established
- Succeeded by: Robert Fleming

Personal details
- Born: after 1662
- Died: late 1733 or early 1734 Caroline County, Colony of Virginia
- Spouse: Elizabeth Cooke
- Children: Richard Jr., Philip, John, William, Elizabeth
- Parent: John Buckner,
- Relatives: John Buckner Jr., Thomas Buckner, William Buckner (brothers)
- Occupation: attorney, planter, politician

Richard Buckner (born after 1662, died in late 1733 or early 1734) was a Virginia attorney and land speculator who served many years as the clerk of Essex County and for three years served as clerk of the Virginia House of Burgesses (1712–1715). When Caroline County was created from Essex County (and included Buckner's home plantation), he held many offices in the new county, including winning election to represent it in the House of Burgesses.

== Early and family life ==
Richard Buckner was a son of John Buckner, who had earlier represented Gloucester County in the House for two terms. His father patented more than 26,000 acres of land in the Virginia colony between 1667 and 1691. Historians disagree as to whether Richard was the eldest or youngest of his father's sons, but he received an education appropriate to his class. His three brothers would also serve as Burgesses in the early 18th century. William Buckner became a prominent merchant in Yorktown and represented York County as a burgess several times, as well as became the colony's deputy surveyor general in 1709. His brothers Thomas and John Buckner Jr. represented Gloucester County as burgesses at various times early in the 18th century. They also had a sister Elizabeth.

Complicating matters, several genealogies confuse him with his son and grandson, all of whom shared the same name. This Richard Buckner married Elizabeth Cooke, and they had sons Richard Jr., Philip, John, and William, as well as a daughter named Elizabeth.

== Career ==
Richard Buckner began his career as a real estate speculator on September 22, 1682, when his father assigned a patent for a 500-acre parcel in Rappahannock County to him, although Richard had not reached legal age. That parcel called "Golden Vale" would be part of the newly created Essex County, and Buckner would live on that parcel the reset of his life, although in his final years it would be within the newly created Caroline County.

Some of Buckner's land speculation involved lands in the Northern Neck of Virginia, across the Rappahannock River from Essex County. In September 1704, the Governor's Council appointed Buckner and three other men to conduct a trial of Nanzatico men accused of murdering a family in Richmond County. Two years later, the Governor's Council assigned Buckner and three others to meet with agents of the Northern Neck Proprietary, to determine the main channel of the Rappahannock River, which divided the Middle Neck (including Essex and later Caroline Counties) from the Northern Neck. Buckner bought and sold lots in Tappahannock (the Essex County seat as well as a port for weighing and shipping tobacco) as well as in neighboring King and Queen county, as well as (after they were created) King George County, Prince William County and Spotsylvania County. In May 1713, Buckner was a silent partner of Larkin Chew, who sold more than 4000 acres of land in the upper part of Essex County to Lt. Gov. Alexander Spotswood, who developed its rich iron ore deposits, especially after convincing a large party of German miners to settle there. That settlement, called Germanna, made Spotswood's fortune.

Richard Buckner had allied himself with Spotswood when the administrator arrived from England in 1710. Spotswood then appointed Buckner clerk of the House of Burgesses in 1712, and in 1714 gave Buckner custody of the weights and measures for tobacco at Tappahannock, a lucrative position. Spotswood was creating a friendly faction, for Richard's brother William Buckner held one of the seats for York County at the time and their other two brothers Thomas and John Buckner held both of Gloucester County's seats in the 1715 session. However, the favoritism backfired. In the 1718 session, Richard fell under the "grave displeasure" of the House for having inserted Spotswood's governor's dissolution address into the Journal of the House (at Spotswood's direction) at the end of the previous session (contrary to previous practice). In the aftermath of the dispute, he declined to continue as clerk, although subsequent clerks would enter similar speeches in the assembly journals.

Richard Buckner served probably from 1703 until 1712 as clerk of Essex County. When Caroline County was created from Essex in 1728 (and Golden Vale was in the new county), Buckner became one of its first Justices (a county magistrate with broad-ranging judicial and executive powers) as well as one of its first Burgesses.

Caroline County voters in a 1729 special election elected him as a burgess to represent them in Williamsburg (part-time) and re-elected him in the 1730–2 session, as well as in 1733. However, he never was seated at that assembly, having died before taking office.

A lawsuit in which he (or his son of the same name) was a party, Thornton v. Buckner, was decided in April 1730.

== Death and legacy ==
The last record indicating Buckner was alive was filed on October 18, 1733, concerning a land sale in Spotsylvania County. His will was admitted to probate in Caroline County on March 14, 1733/4.
