= James Turner Morehead (chemist) =

American chemist and entrepreneur

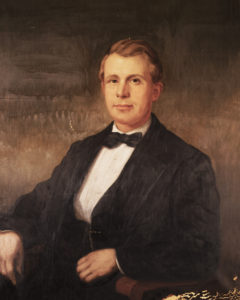

Personal details
- Born: August 6, 1840
- Died: April 20, 1908 (aged 67) New York, New York
- Spouse: Mary Elizabeth Connally (m. 1864)
- Relations: James Turner Morehead (uncle)
- Children: 5, including John and Lilly
- Parents: John Motley Morehead (father); Ann Eliza Lindsay (mother)
- Education: University of North Carolina at Chapel Hill
- Occupation: Chemist, entrepreneur

Military service
- Allegiance: Confederate States
- Branch/service: Confederate Army
- Years of service: 1862-65
- Rank: Lieutenant
- Battles/wars: American Civil War: Battle of Bristoe Station

James Turner Morehead (August 6, 1840 – April 20, 1908) was an American chemist and entrepreneur.

== Early life ==
The son of Governor John Motley Morehead and First Lady Ann Eliza Lindsay Morehead, he graduated from the University of North Carolina at Chapel Hill in 1861, where he joined Beta Theta Pi.

== Career ==
Commissioned a lieutenant in the Confederate army, he was wounded at Bristoe Station, Virginia in 1863; he ended the war as a major. Following the war, he served two terms as a state senator (1870-1874).

Upon his father's death, he inherited his properties, and soon became a pioneering chemical manufacturer. He and his son, John Motley Morehead III, would found one of the world's leading chemical companies — Union Carbide, assisted by Thomas Willson, who discovered calcium carbide at one of his furnaces.

Willson, through his continuing experimentation with calcium carbide and other chemicals, ultimately contributed to the later war effort during the Spanish–American War.

A serial entrepreneur, chemist, engineer, inventor and author of scientific works, Morehead later entered into cotton manufacturing.

== Personal life ==
He had one son, John Motley Morehead III, a chemist, diplomat, industrialist, and noted philanthropist; and four daughters: Mary Kerr Morehead Harris (2 children: Trent Harris, William Nelson Harris), Eliza Lindsay Morehead Nelson (1 child: William Harris Nelson), Lily Morehead Mebane (no children), and Emma Gray Morehead Parrish (no children).

Morehead died on April 20, 1908, in New York City.
