= Richard A. Buckner =

American politician

Richard Aylett Buckner

Member of the U.S. House of Representatives from Kentucky's 8th district
- In office March 4, 1823 – March 3, 1829
- Preceded by: James D. Breckinridge
- Succeeded by: Nathan Gaither

Member of the Kentucky House of Representatives
- In office 1813-1815

Personal details
- Born: February 5, 1784 Fauquier County, Virginia
- Died: December 8, 1847 (aged 63) Greensburg, Kentucky
- Party: Adams-Clay Republican, Adams Party

Richard Aylett Buckner (February 5, 1784 – December 8, 1847) was a lawyer and farmer who served as a United States representative from Kentucky as well as Surveyor-General of Kentucky and judge of Kentucky's 18th judicial district. He may be best known as the father of Aylette Hartswell Buckner, who also served as a representative from Kentucky, or as the eldest of three American public officials of the same name. His son Richard Aylett Buckner (1810–1900), also a judge, helped keep Kentucky in the Union and his grandson Richard Aylett Buckner (1849–1922) became an Arkansas state senator.

== Early and family life ==
Born in Fauquier County, Virginia to the former Judith Thornton and her husband Aylett Buckner. His paternal ancestors had emigrated from England more than a century before, and his father was named to honor his maternal grandfather. His father served in the Fauquier militia, then the Virginia Line as an officer during the Revolutionary War, and owned 11 adult slaves and 17 younger slaves as well as five horses and ten cattle in the 1787 Virginia tax census. The family also included Thornton Buckner (1778–1837) who represented Fauquier County for a decade in the Virginia House of Delegates before moving to Missouri. The family also included a daughter, Catherine Taliaferro Buckner Taylor, who likewise moved to Greensburg, Kentucky with her husband and family. Richard Aylett Buckner received a private education appropriate to his class.

Buckner married his cousin Elizabeth Lewis Buckner (1791–1868), who gave birth to a very large family, as well as survived her husband by more than two decades. At least two of their sons continued the family's legal and political traditions through the Civil War, as would their son-in-law, Col. John Allen. Their firstborn son, Aylette Hartswell Buckner (1806–1869) became a lawyer and served in Congress before his father's death, and Aylette's never-married brother Richard A. Buckner Jr. (1810–1900) became a judge. Their brother William Buckner married Jane Du Tois Robards and had children, as did Dr. George R. Buckner (1823–1897), who married Harriet Ann Creel and moved to Missouri and Arkansas where they named one of their sons after his grandfather. According to this man's will, his youngest son, John, was underage at the time of his father's death and became the ward of his Col. John Allen. Other sons included Luther A. Buckner (1819–1899), who became attorney general of Nevada and would ultimately die in that state; his remains were returned to The Lexington Cemetery in Kentucky, as were those of his sister Elizabeth Robards Buckner Allen (1821–1897) from Memphis.

== Career ==
Buckner moved to Green County, Kentucky in 1803, with his father and many extended family members. He taught school while he also read law. By 1811 he had been admitted to the bar and was practicing law at the county seat (Greensburg). Buckner also served as county attorney and Commonwealth's attorney (prosecutor).

In 1813 and 1815, Green County voters elected Buckner to represent them in the Kentucky House of Representatives. In 1822 he won election as an Adams-Clay Republican (or anti-Democrat) to the Eighteenth Congress, and he won re-election as an Adams candidate to the Nineteenth, and Twentieth Congresses (March 4, 1823 – March 3, 1829). In Congress, Buckner served as chairman, Committee on Private Land Claims (Nineteenth and Twentieth Congresses). He failed to win reelection in 1828 to the Twenty-first Congress, and returned to his farm and legal practice in Kentucky.

In late 1831, Buckner accepted appointment as associate judge of the Kentucky court of appeals December 31, 1831, but resigned shortly afterwards. He ran unsuccessfully for Governor of Kentucky in 1832. At the end of the decade, he won election again to the Kentucky House of Representatives, serving from 1837 to 1839. He was a presidential elector on the William Henry Harrison tickets in 1836 and 1840. However, he maintained his home in Green County, Kentucky, where he served as a circuit judge for the 18th judicial circuit beginning in 1845.

In his early years in Green County, this Richard A. Buckner probably owned 6 slaves, and did own six slaves in 1820 By the 1830 census, Green's household had increased to 12 free white persons and 22 enslaved. In the final census of his lifetime, Buckner owned twenty slaves: one elderly man and one elderly woman, one woman between 36 and 54 years old, four men and three women between 24 and 35 years old, three men and four women between 10 and 23 years old and one boy and two girls.

== Death and legacy ==
Buckner died in Greensburg, Kentucky in 1847 and was buried in the family graveyard at "Buckner's Hill." At least three of his sons survived the Civil War, but possibly his most famous descendant was U.S. Army officer turned Confederate General Simon Bolivar Buckner.

A son or grandson named Richard Buckner traveled down the Ohio River and joined a relative named Thornton Buckner in St. Louis, where he helped to found St. Louis University's law school, then served as a professor.

Another grandson who chose a military career was Richard Aylett Buckner (1849-), who became captain of the Kentucky governor's guards and defended Frankfort in 1863. Following the conflict, he moved westward and chose the family's legal and political path, becoming a lawyer in 1884, and practicing in Dermott, Arkansas. He became a delegate to the national Republican conventions in 1880 and 1884, then a state senator from Arkansas' 15th senatorial district.

Party political offices
Preceded by Thomas Metcalfe	National Republican nominee for Governor of Kentucky; 1832	Succeeded by None
U.S. House of Representatives
Preceded by James D. Breckinridge	Member of the U.S. House of Representatives from Kentucky's 8th congressional district 1823 – 1829	Succeeded by Nathan Gaither
