= List of elections in 1836 =

The following elections occurred in the year 1836.

== Europe ==
=== Spain ===
- February 1836 Spanish general election
- July 1836 Spanish general election
- October 1836 Spanish general election

== North America ==
=== Canada ===
- 1836 Newfoundland general election

=== United States ===
- 1836 United States elections

==== United States Presidential ====
- 1836 United States presidential election

==== United States Senate ====
- 1836 and 1837 United States Senate elections
- 1836 United States Senate election in Pennsylvania

==== United States House of Representatives ====
- 1836 United States House of Representatives elections

==== United States lieutenant gubernatorial ====
- 1836 Connecticut lieutenant gubernatorial election
- 1836 Missouri lieutenant gubernatorial election

==== United States gubernatorial ====
- 1836 Arkansas gubernatorial election
- 1836 Connecticut gubernatorial election
- 1836 Delaware gubernatorial election
- 1836 Kentucky gubernatorial election
- 1836 Maine gubernatorial election
- 1836 Maryland gubernatorial election
- 1836 Massachusetts gubernatorial election
- 1836 Missouri gubernatorial election
- 1836 New Hampshire gubernatorial election
- 1836 New Jersey gubernatorial election
- 1836 New York gubernatorial election
- 1836 North Carolina gubernatorial election
- 1836 Ohio gubernatorial election
- 1836 Rhode Island gubernatorial election
- 1836 South Carolina gubernatorial election
- 1836 Vermont gubernatorial election

==== United States mayoral ====
- 1836 Boston mayoral election

== South America ==
- 1836 Chilean presidential election

== See also ==
- Category:1836 elections
