= Battle of Germantown order of battle =

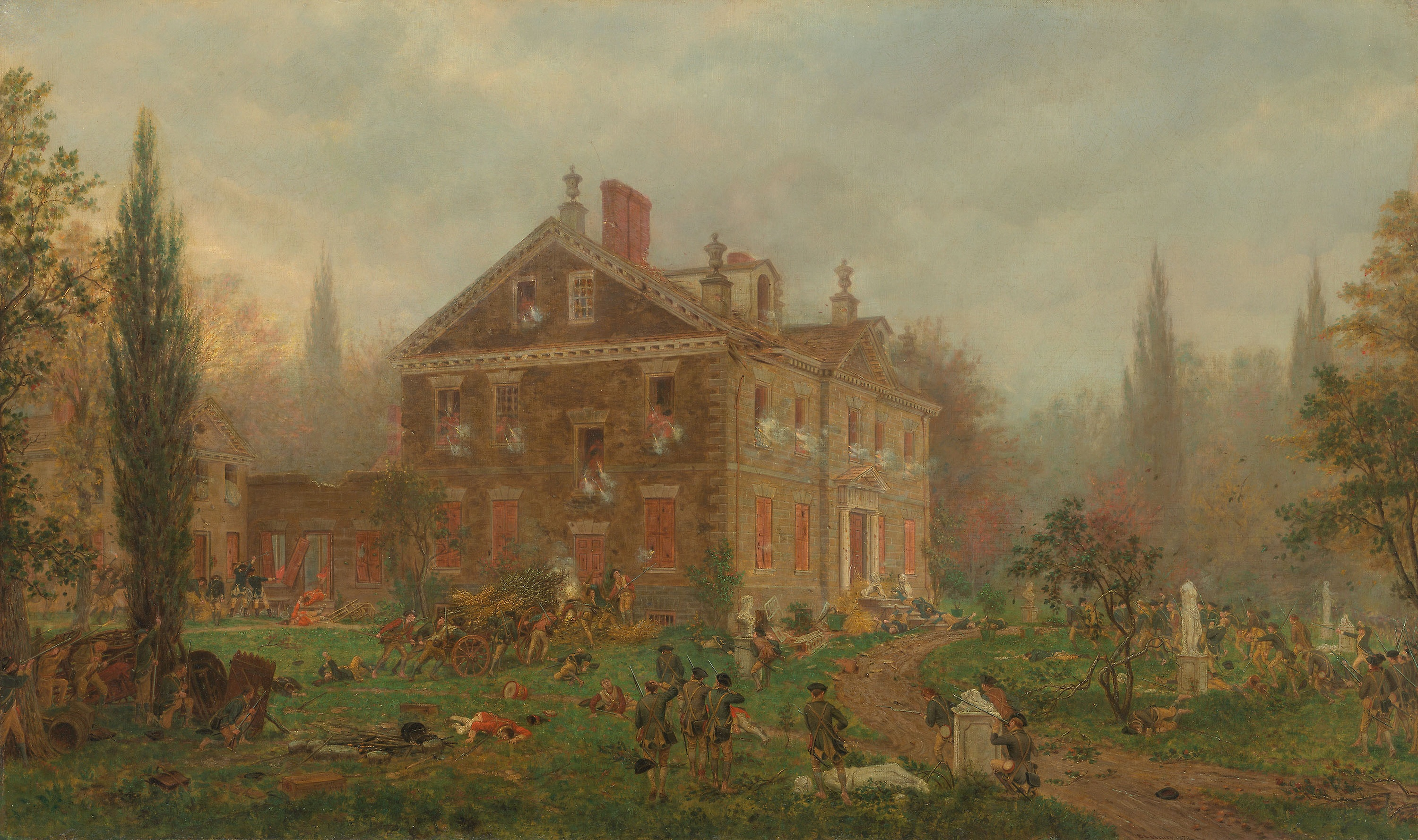
Battle of Germantown

The Battle of Germantown on 4 October 1777 pitted a 9,000-man British army under General William Howe against an 11,000-strong American army commanded by General George Washington. After an initial advance, the American reserve allowed itself to be diverted by 120 British troops holding out in the Benjamin Chew House. A heavy morning fog disoriented the American assault columns and led to a friendly fire incident between elements of Major General John Sullivan's right column and Major General Nathanael Greene's left column. At about this time, the American attack lost impetus and both columns retreated. Meanwhile, two wide flanking columns numbering 3,000 American militia had little effect on the outcome. American losses were 152 men killed, 521 wounded and 438 captured, while Howe's men suffered 71 killed, 448 wounded and 14 missing.

== British Army order of battle ==
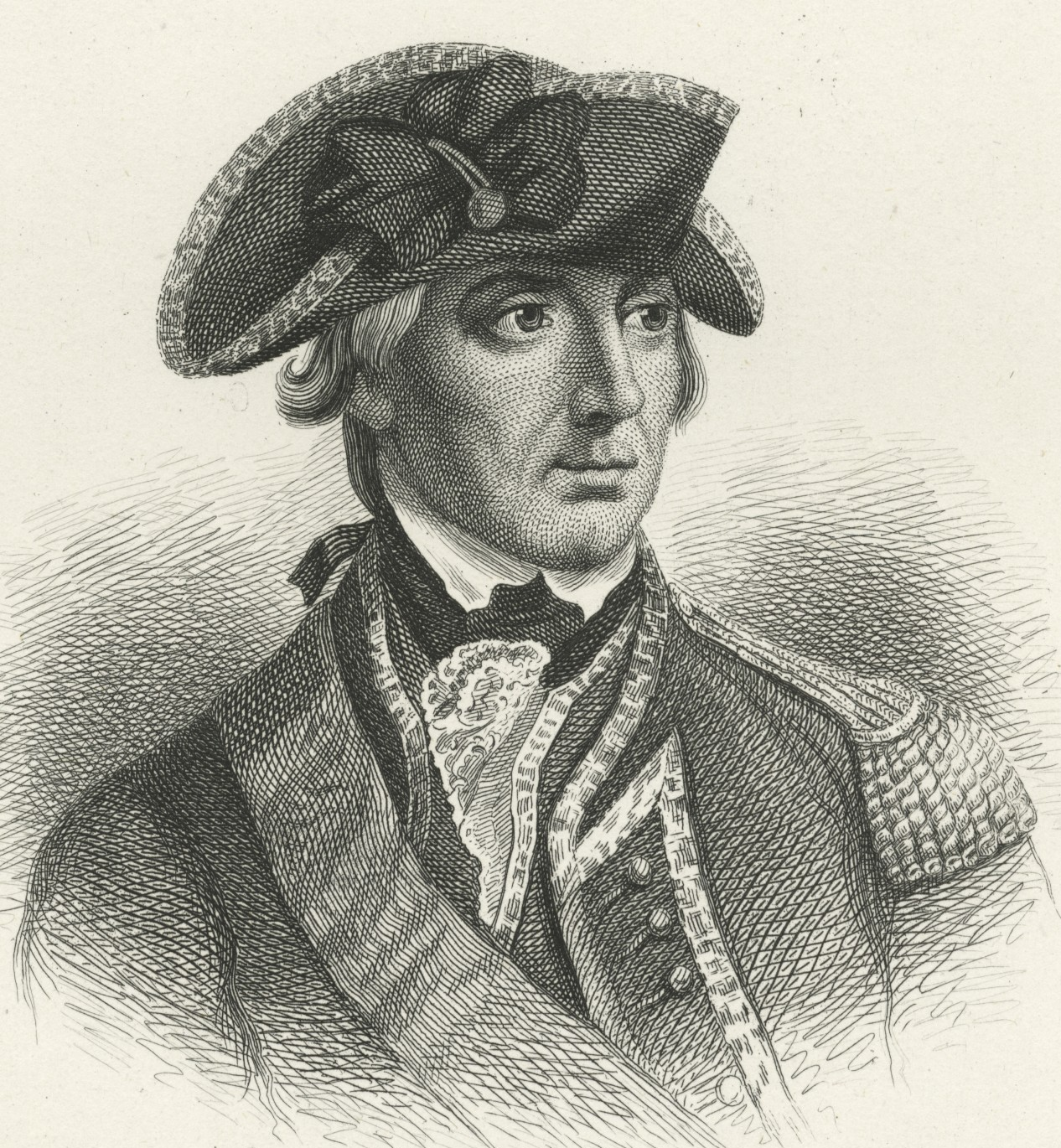
Sir William Howe

General Sir William Howe (9,000)

=== Picket ===
Brigadier General Sir William Erskine

- 40th Foot, Lieutenant Colonel Thomas Musgrave
- 1st Light Infantry Battalion, Lieutenant Colonel Robert Abercromby of Airthrey
  - 14 light companies
- 2nd Light Infantry Battalion, Brigadier General Sir William Erskine, Major John Maitland
  - 14 light companies

=== Right Wing ===
General Sir William Howe

- Guards Brigade: Brigadier General Edward Mathew
  - Elements of 1st Foot Guards, 2nd Foot Guards, and 3rd Foot Guards Regiments
  - 1st Battalion (488)
    - Grenadier company, Lieutenant Colonel Sir George Osborn (124)
    - Hyde's company (93)
    - Wrottesley's company (91)
    - Cox's company (90)
    - Garth's company (90)
  - 2nd Battalion (451)
    - Stephen's company (88)
    - Murray's company (89)
    - O'Hara's company (87)
    - Martin's company (91)
    - Light company, Lieutenant Colonel Osborn (96)
- 1st Brigade: Major General James Grant
  - 4th Foot
  - 28th Foot
  - 49th Foot
- 2nd Brigade: Major General Grant
  - 5th Foot
  - 27th Foot
  - 55th Foot
- Reinforcements: Lieutenant General Charles, Earl Cornwallis, Lieutenant Colonel Henry Monckton
  - 1st Grenadier Battalion
  - 2nd Grenadier Battalion, Lieutenant Colonel Henry Monckton
- Unbrigaded:
  - Queen's Rangers: Colonel James Weymss
  - Light Dragoons (2 squadrons)

=== Left Wing ===
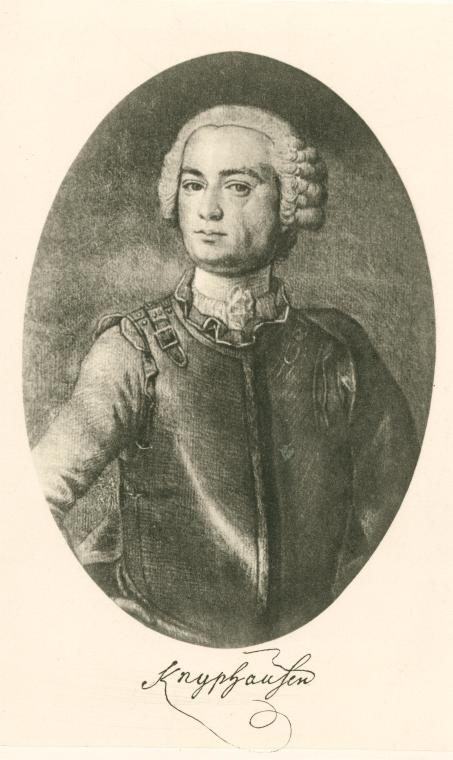
Wilhelm von Knyphausen

Lieutenant General Wilhelm von Knyphausen

- Hessian Jaegers: Lieutenant Colonel Ludwig von Wurmb
- 3rd Brigade: Major General Charles Grey
  - 15th Foot
  - 17th Foot
  - 44th Foot
- 4th Brigade: Major General James Agnew †
  - 33rd Foot
  - 37th Foot
  - 46th Foot
  - 64th Foot
- Hessian Brigade: Major General Johann Daniel Stirn
  - Erbprinz Infantry Regiment
  - Donop Infantry Regiment
- Reinforcements: Colonel Carl von Donop
  - Grenadier Battalion Minningerode
  - Grenadier Battalion Linsing

=== British and Hessian officers ===
James Grant

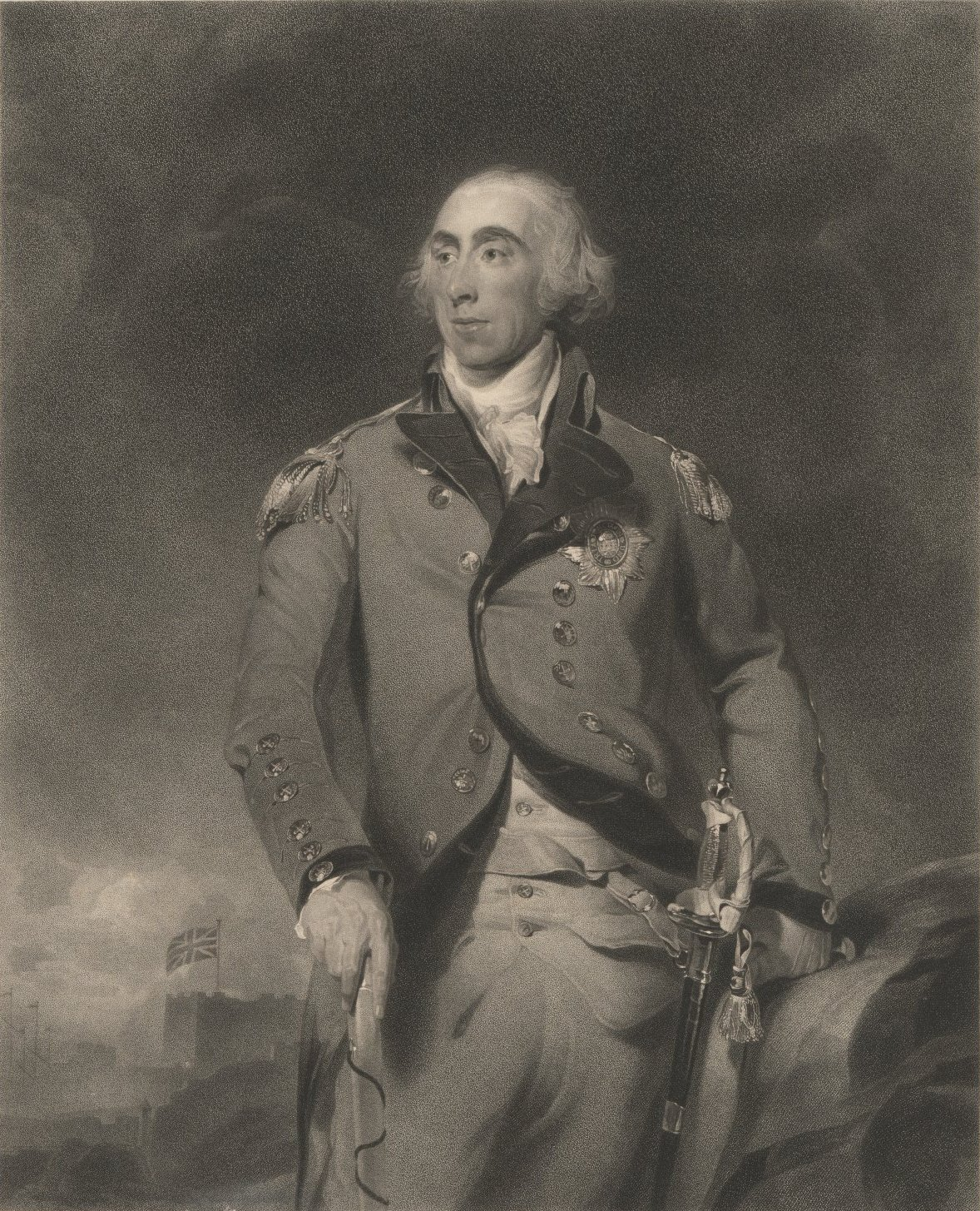

Charles Grey

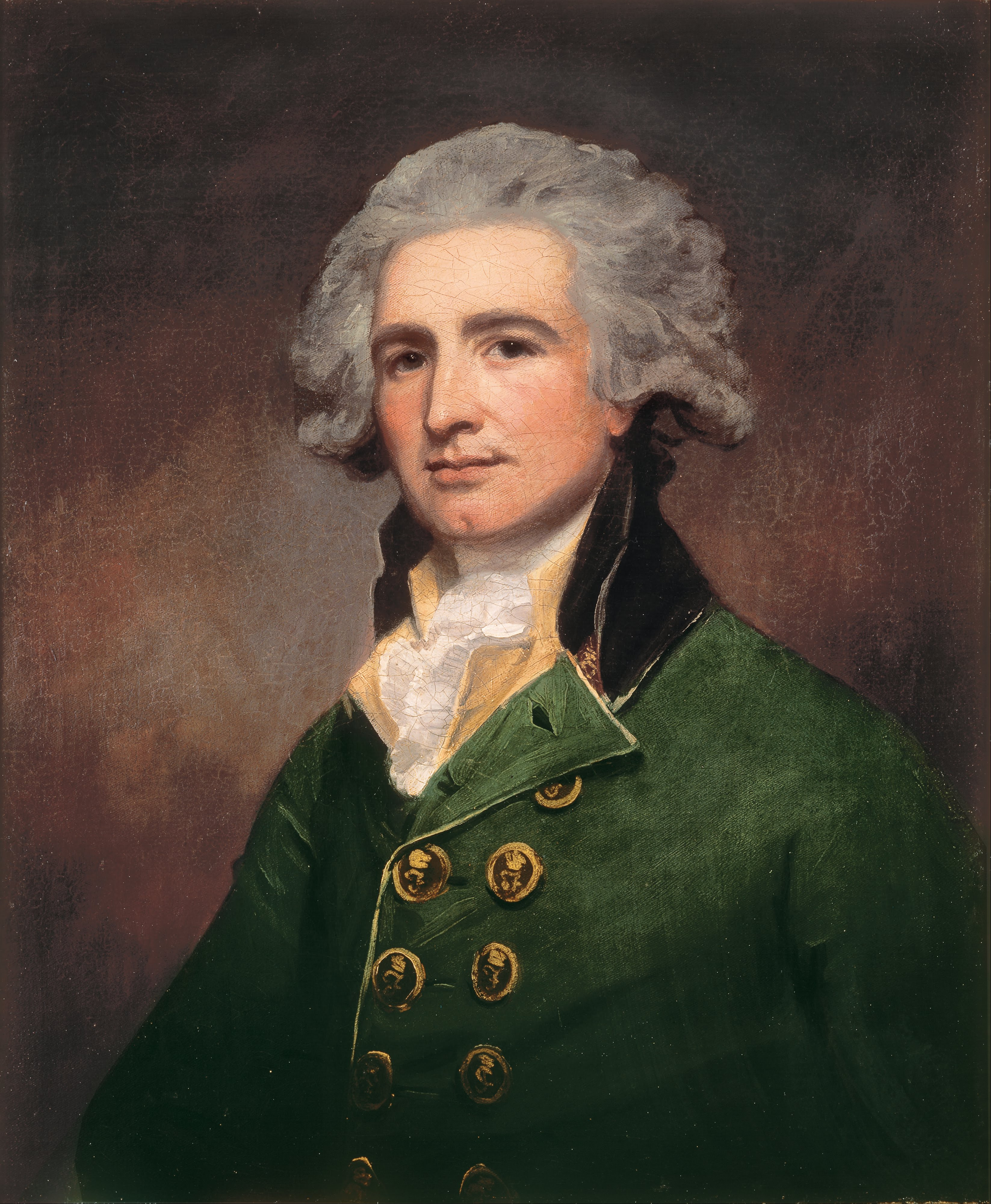

Robert Abercromby

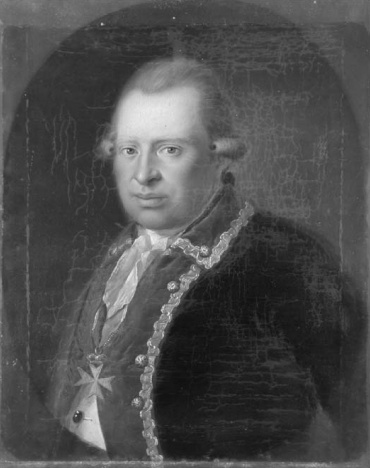

Ludwig von Wurmb

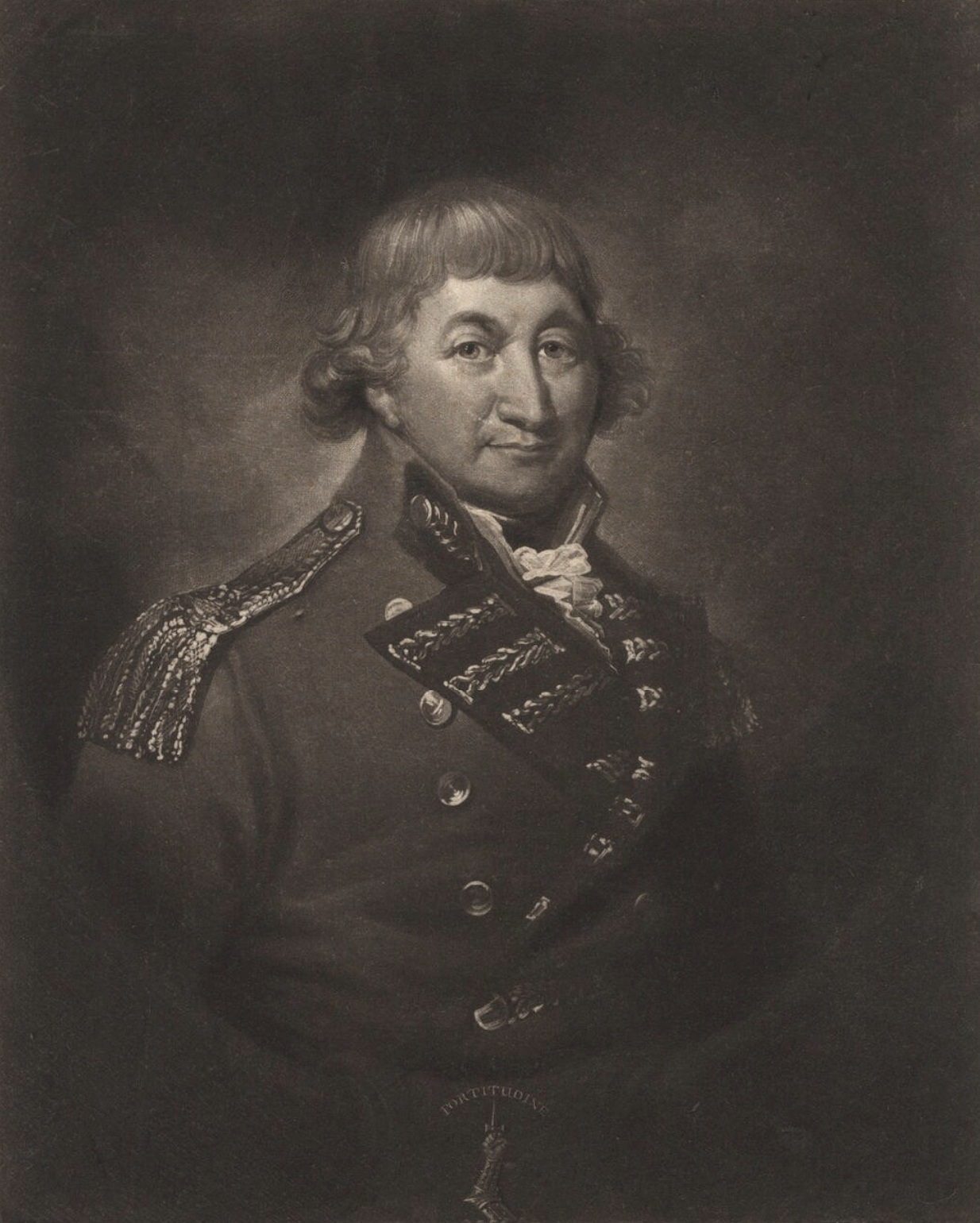

Sir William Erskine

== American Army order of battle ==
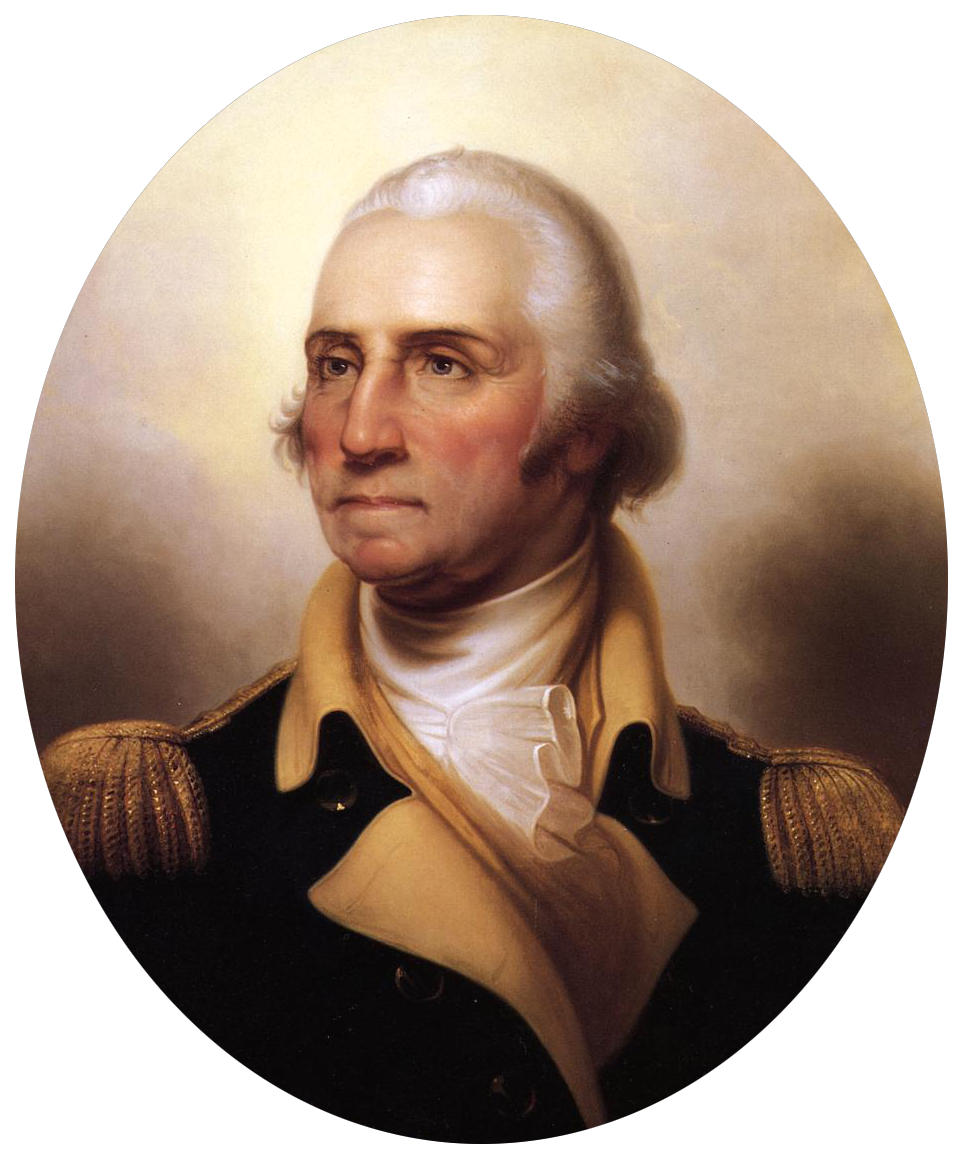
George Washington

General and Commander-in-Chief George Washington (8,000 regulars, 3,000 militia, 200 cavalry)

=== Right Wing Militia ===
Brigadier General John Armstrong Sr. (1,500)

- Pennsylvania Militia Brigade: Brigadier General James Potter
- four light cannons
- 1st Philadelphia City Troop

=== Left Wing Militia ===
Brigadier General William Smallwood (1,500)

- Maryland Militia Brigade: Brigadier General Smallwood
- New Jersey Militia Brigade: Brigadier General David Forman

=== Right Wing Continentals ===
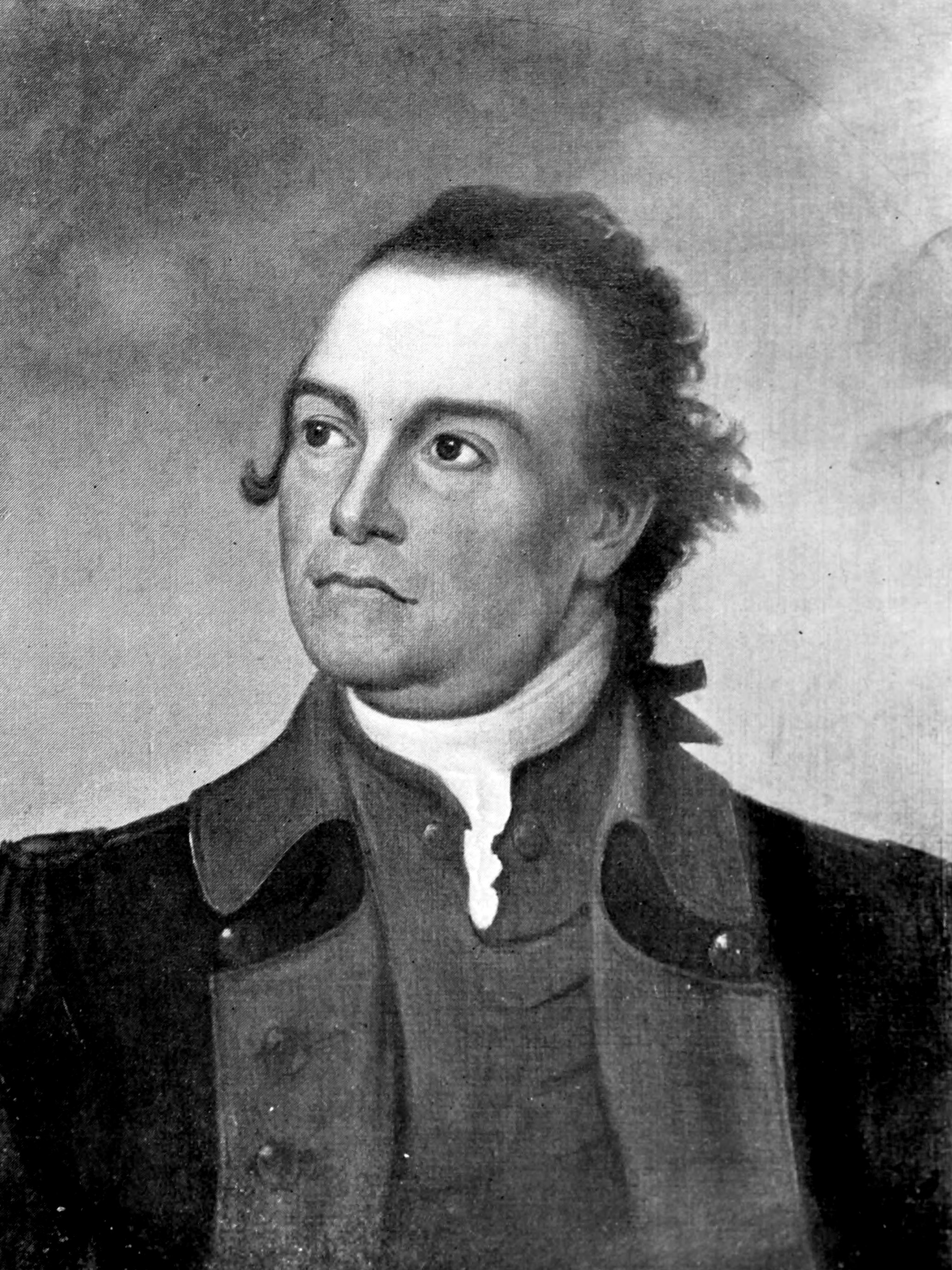
John Sullivan

Major General John Sullivan

- Division: Major General Sullivan (1,000)
  - 1st Maryland Brigade: Colonel John Hoskins Stone
    - 1st Maryland Regiment, Colonel John Hoskins Stone
    - 3rd Maryland Regiment
    - 7th Maryland Regiment
    - 1st Delaware Regiment, Colonel David Hall
  - 2nd Maryland Brigade: Colonel Moses Hazen
    - 2nd Maryland Regiment
    - 4th Maryland Regiment, Colonel Josias Hall, Major John Eager Howard
    - 6th Maryland Regiment
    - 2nd Canadian Regiment, Colonel Moses Hazen

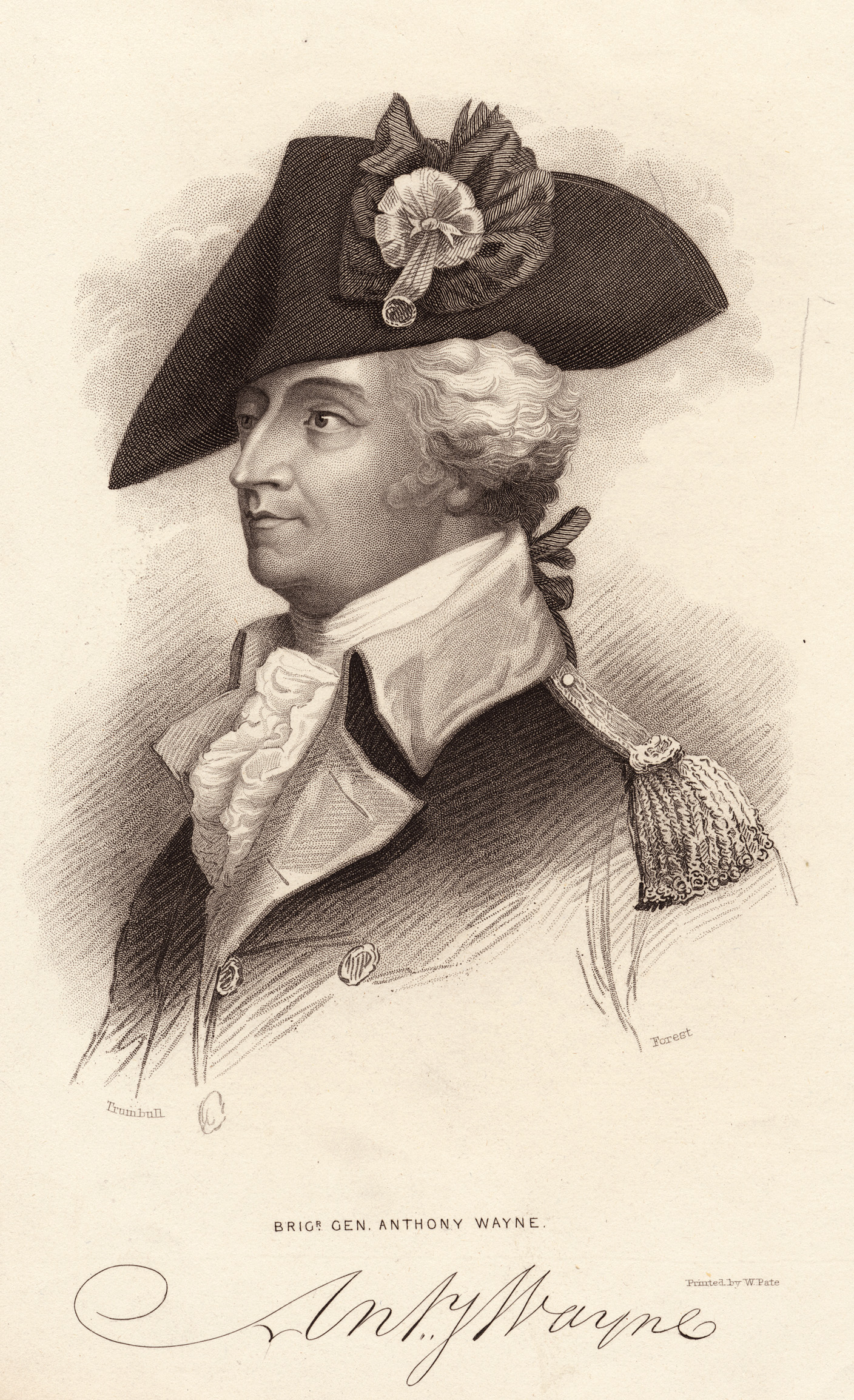
Anthony Wayne

- Division: Brigadier General Anthony Wayne (2,000 including Conway)
  - 1st Pennsylvania Brigade: Colonel Thomas Hartley
    - 1st Pennsylvania Regiment
    - 2nd Pennsylvania Regiment
    - 7th Pennsylvania Regiment
    - 10th Pennsylvania Regiment, Lieutenant Colonel Adam Hubley
    - Hartley's Additional Continental Regiment, Lieutenant Colonel Morgan Connor
  - 2nd Pennsylvania Brigade: Colonel Richard Humpton
    - 4th Pennsylvania Regiment
    - 5th Pennsylvania Regiment
    - 8th Pennsylvania Regiment
    - 11th Pennsylvania Regiment
- 3rd Pennsylvania Brigade: Brigadier General Thomas Conway
  - 3rd Pennsylvania Regiment
  - 6th Pennsylvania Regiment, Lieutenant Colonel Josiah Harmar
  - 9th Pennsylvania Regiment
  - 12th Pennsylvania Regiment
- Cavalry:
  - Delaware Horse: Captain Allen McLane
  - 1st Continental Light Dragoons detachment: Colonel Theodorick Bland
  - 4th Continental Light Dragoons detachment: Colonel Stephen Moylan

=== Left Wing Continentals ===
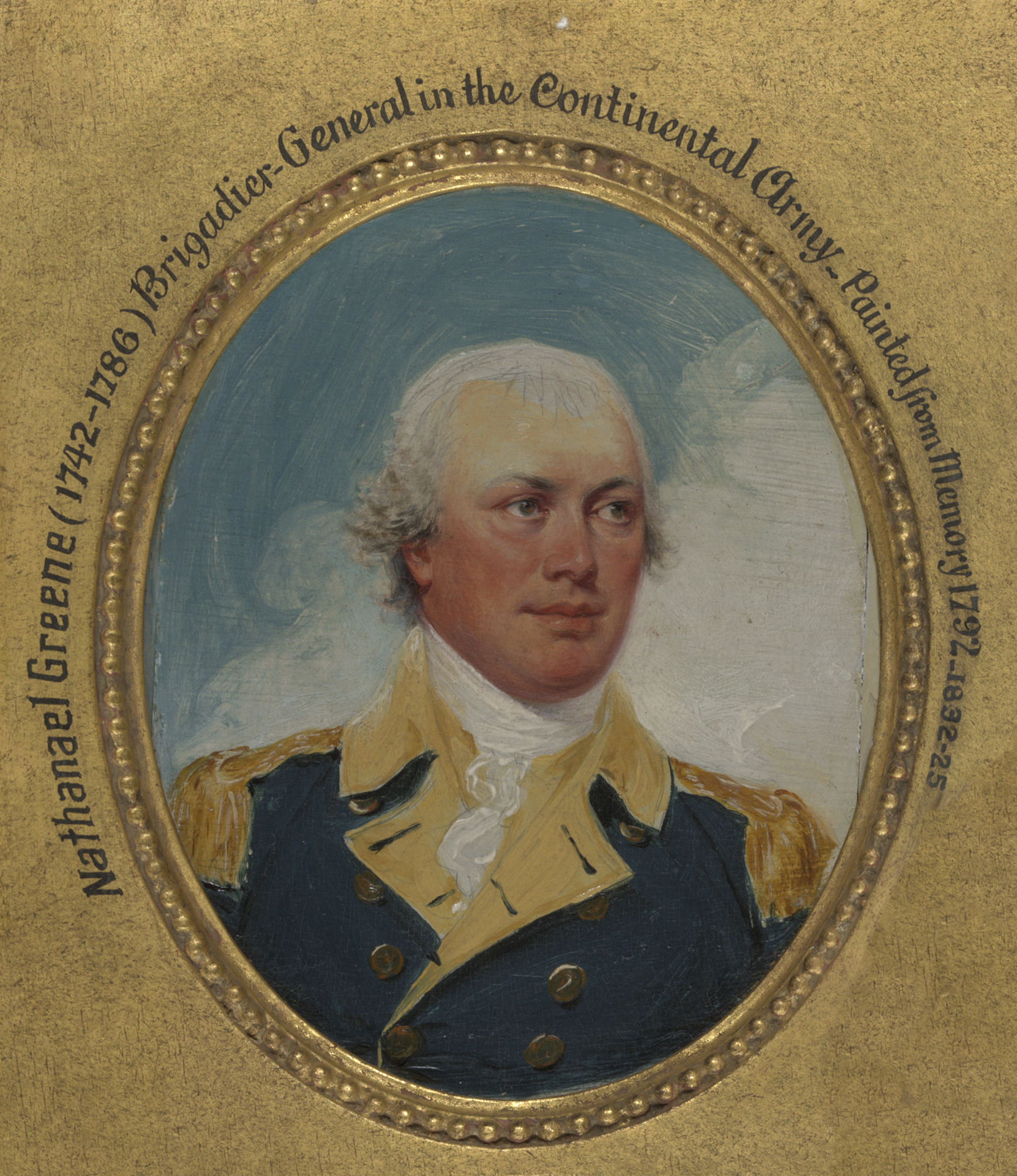
Nathanael Greene

Major General Nathanael Greene

- Connecticut Brigade: Brigadier General Alexander McDougall (1,000)
  - 1st Connecticut Regiment
  - 2nd Connecticut Regiment
  - 4th Connecticut Regiment
  - 5th Connecticut Regiment, Colonel Philip Burr Bradley
  - 7th Connecticut Regiment
- Division: Major General Greene (1,500)
  - 1st Virginia Brigade: Brigadier General Peter Muhlenberg
    - 1st Virginia Regiment, Colonel James Hendricks
    - 5th Virginia Regiment, Colonel Josiah Parker
    - 9th Virginia Regiment, Colonel George Mathews (Lt. Col. John Sayres killed in action; Major Levin Joynes captured)
    - 13th Virginia Regiment, Colonel William Russell
  - 2nd Virginia Brigade: Brigadier General George Weedon
    - 2nd Virginia Regiment, Colonel Richard Parker
    - 6th Virginia Regiment, Colonel John Gibson
    - 10th Virginia Regiment, Colonel Edward Stevens
    - 14th Virginia Regiment, Colonel Charles Lewis
    - Pennsylvania State Regiment, Colonel Walter Stewart

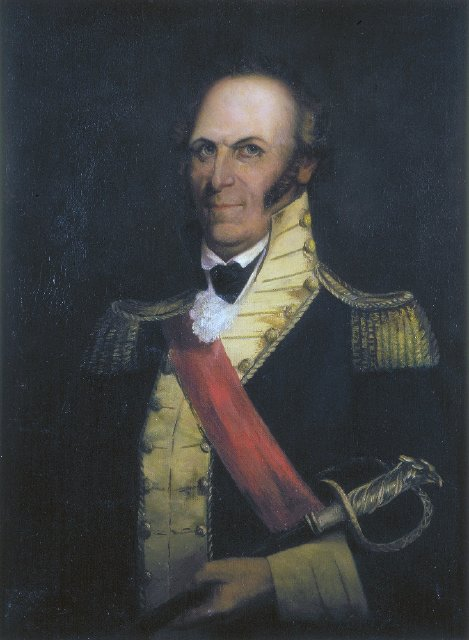
Charles Scott

- Division: Major General Adam Stephen (1,500)
  - 3rd Virginia Brigade: Brigadier General William Woodford (absent)
    - 3rd Virginia Regiment, Lieutenant Colonel T. Will Heth
    - 7th Virginia Regiment, Colonel Alexander McClanachan
    - 11th Virginia Regiment, Lieutenant Colonel Christian Febiger
    - 15th Virginia Regiment
  - 4th Virginia Brigade: Brigadier General Charles Scott
    - 4th Virginia Regiment, Colonel Robert Lawson
    - 8th Virginia Regiment, Colonel Abraham Bowman (Major William Darke captured)
    - 12th Virginia Regiment, Colonel James Wood
- Cavalry: Brigadier General Count Casimir Pulaski

=== Reserve ===
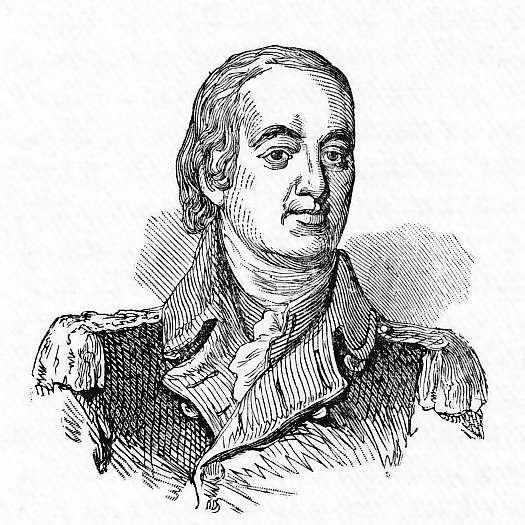
Lord Stirling

Major General William Alexander, Lord Stirling (1,200)

- North Carolina Brigade: Brigadier General Francis Nash †
  - 1st North Carolina Regiment, Colonel Thomas Clark
  - 2nd North Carolina Regiment
  - 3rd North Carolina Regiment, Colonel Jethro Sumner
  - 4th North Carolina Regiment
  - 5th North Carolina Regiment
  - 6th North Carolina Regiment
  - 7th North Carolina Regiment, Colonel James Hogun
  - 8th North Carolina Regiment
  - 9th North Carolina Regiment
- New Jersey Brigade: Brigadier General William Maxwell
  - 1st New Jersey Regiment, Colonel Matthias Ogden
  - 2nd New Jersey Regiment, Colonel Israel Shreve
  - 3rd New Jersey Regiment, Colonel Elias Dayton
  - 4th New Jersey Regiment
- Artillery: Brigadier General Henry Knox
  - Pennsylvania Artillery: Colonel Thomas Proctor (two guns)

=== American officers ===
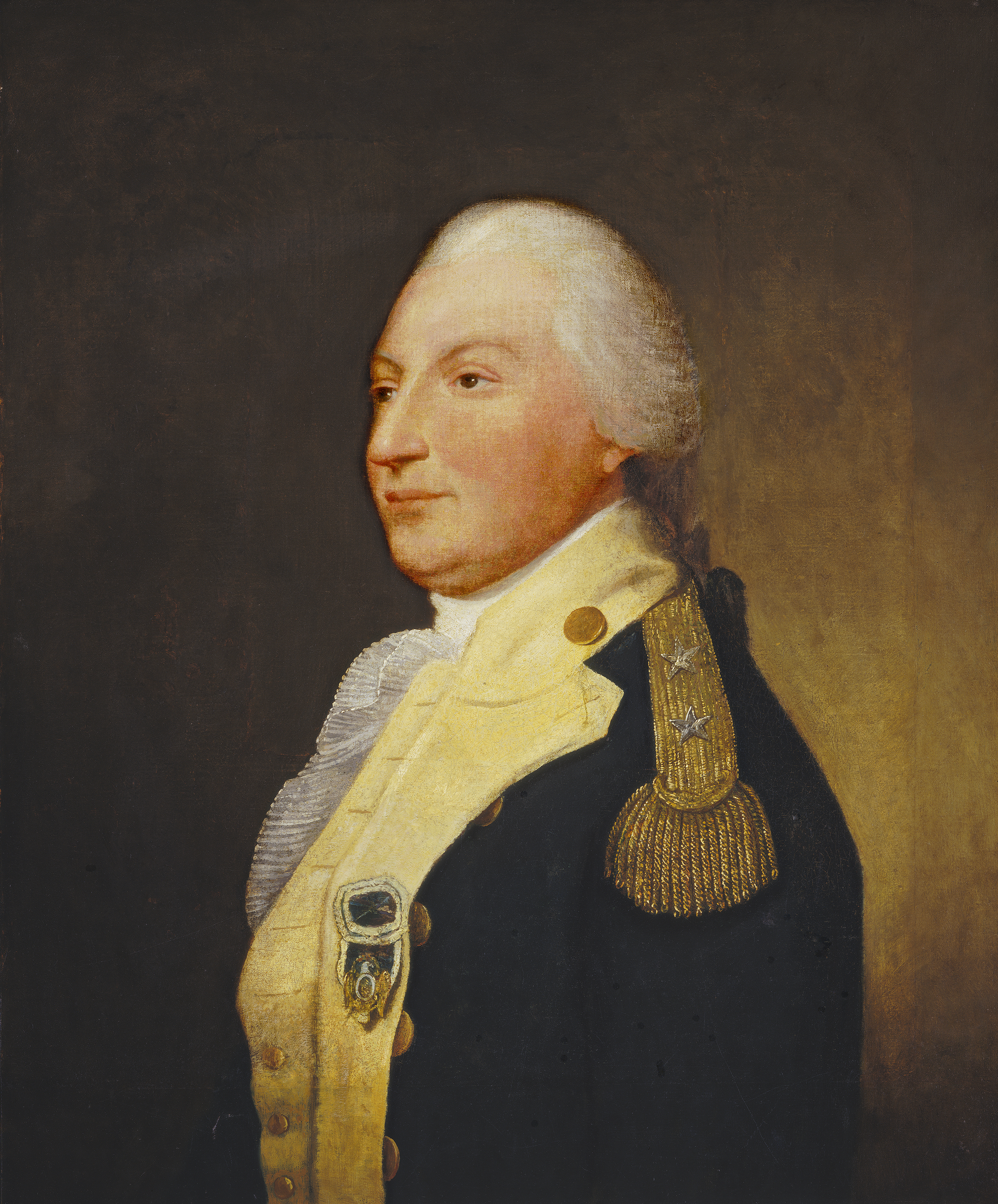

|
William Smallwood

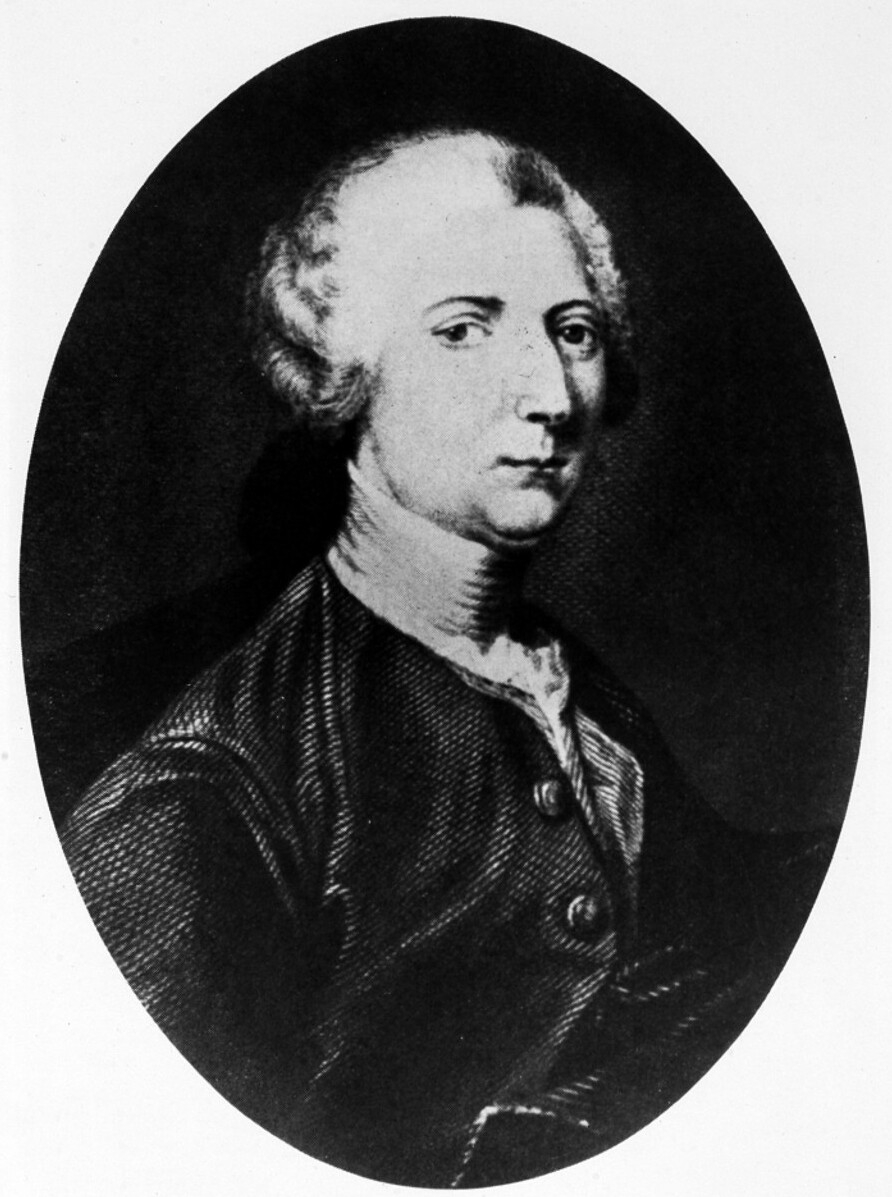

|
Thomas Conway

|
Henry Knox

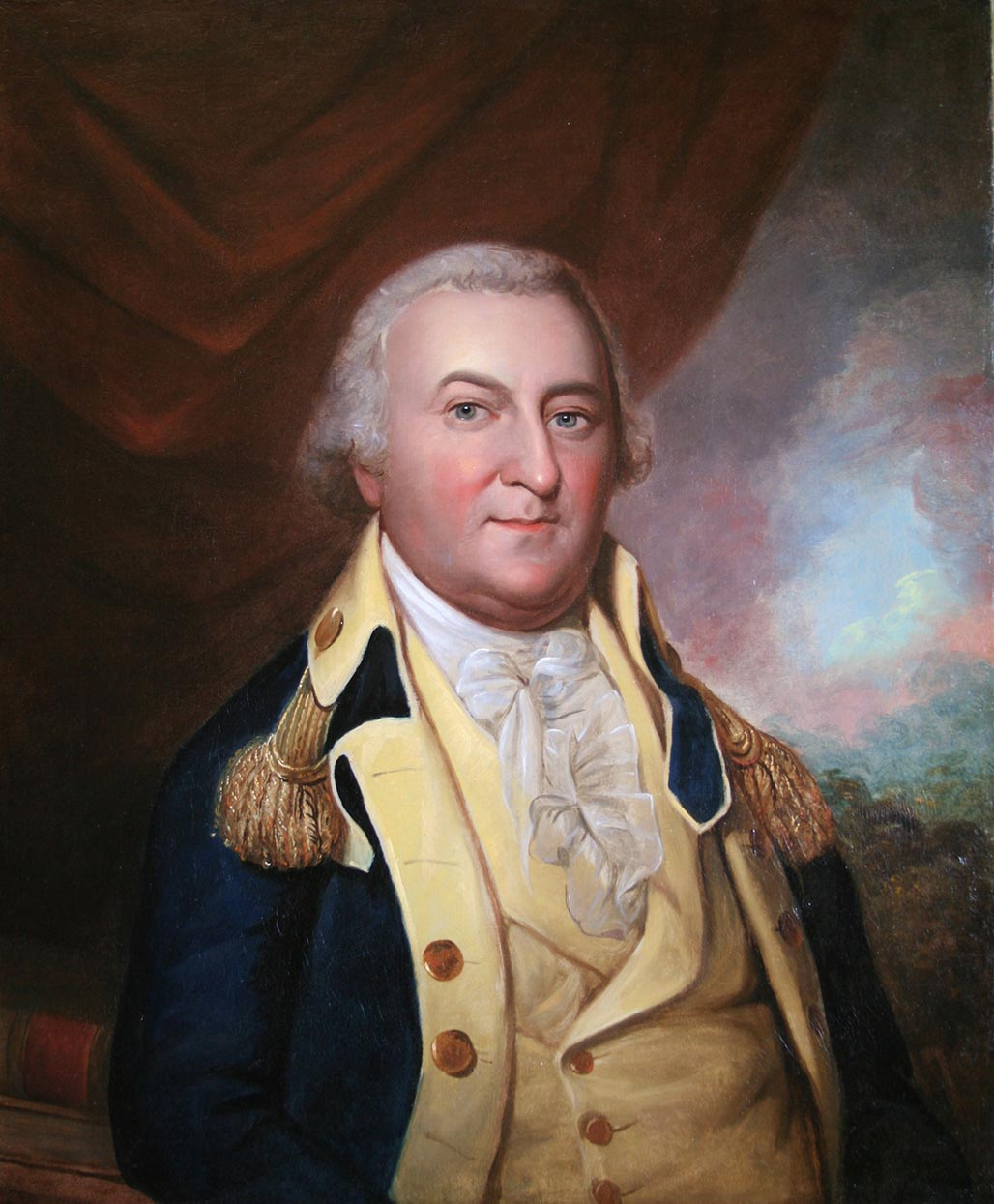

|
John Hoskins Stone

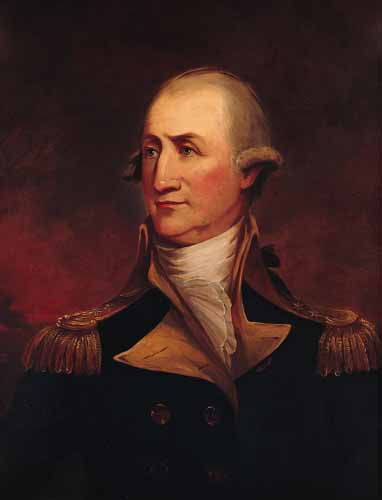

Peter Muhlenberg
