= William Crawford (soldier) =

American military officer and surveyor (1722–1782)

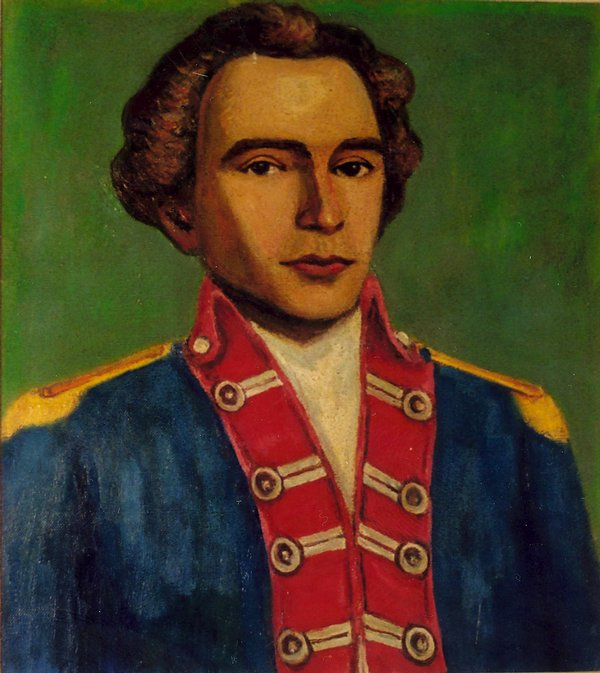
- Born: September 2, 1722; Westmoreland County, Virginia
- Died: June 11, 1782 (aged 59); Carey, Ohio
- Military career
- Allegiance: Virginia (1754–1763); United States (1776–1782)
- Branch: Virginia Militia (1754–1763); Continental Army (1776–1782)
- Rank: Colonel
- Units: 5th Virginia Regiment; 7th Virginia Regiment; 13th Virginia Regiment
- Conflicts: French and Indian War; Lord Dunmore's War; American Revolutionary War; Crawford expedition

William Crawford (September 2, 1722 – June 11, 1782) was an American military officer and surveyor who worked as a land agent alongside George Washington while Washington was a teenager. Crawford fought in the French and Indian War, Lord Dunmore's War and the American Revolutionary War, rising to the rank of Colonel. In 1782, his unit was attacked, and while he and his surgeon escaped for less than one day, Crawford was eventually captured, tortured and burned at the stake by Crawford's former soldier-turned-British-agent, Simon Girty, and Captain Pipe, a Chief of the Delaware Nation.

== Early career ==
Crawford was born on September 2, 1722, in Westmoreland County, Virginia. Before a 1995 genealogical study by Allen W. Scholl, his birth year was erroneously estimated to be 1732. He was a son of William Crawford Sr. and his wife Honora Grimes, who were Scots-Irish farmers. William Crawford Sr was a Presbyterian of Scottish descent from Coleraine, Ireland in what is today Northern Ireland and Honora Grimes was a Presbyterian of Scottish descent from Ballymoney, Ireland in what is today Northern Ireland. After his father's death in 1736, Crawford's mother married Richard Stephenson. Crawford had a younger brother, Valentine Crawford, plus five half-brothers and one half-sister from his mother's second marriage. Crawford's first cousin, Benjamin Lewis, led a campaign along with Thomas Jefferson in December 1768 on the need for expanded surveys in the Kanawha and Ohio region after the ratification of the Treaty of Fort Stanwix in November. Crawford under the direction of Washington eventually led subsequent surveys of the Kanawha, Ohio and Kentucky region in the years afterwards through 1773.

In 1742 Crawford married one Ann Stewart, with whom he had one child, a daughter also named Ann, in 1743. Apparently she died in childbirth or soon after, and on January 5, 1744, he married Hannah Vance, said to have been born in Pennsylvania in 1723. Their son John married one Effie Grimes; Ophelia married William McCormick, who served as a Captain during the Northwest Indian Wars, and Sarah who married Major William Harrison who was captured and killed by Captain Pipe. Simon Girty, before he tortured and killed Crawford, lied and told Crawford his son-in-law was alive and being held prisoner by a separate Shawnee, who had already been killed.

In 1749, Crawford became acquainted with George Washington, who at the time was still a teenager and just recently appointed as the surveyor of Culpeper County. Crawford, more seasoned, accompanied Washington on several surveying trips. In 1755, Crawford commissioned in the Virginia militia and served in the Braddock expedition holding the rank of ensign. Like Washington, he survived the disastrous Battle of the Monongahela. During the French and Indian War, he served in Washington's Virginia Regiment, guarding the Virginia frontier against Native American raiding parties. In 1758, Crawford was a member of General John Forbes's army which captured Fort Duquesne, where Pittsburgh, Pennsylvania, now stands. He continued to serve in the military, taking part in Pontiac's War in 1763.

In 1765 Crawford built a cabin on the Braddock Road along the Youghiogheny River in what is now Connellsville, Fayette County, Pennsylvania. His wife and three children joined him there the following year. Crawford supported himself as a farmer and fur trader. When the 1768 Treaty of Fort Stanwix with the Iroquois opened up additional land for settlement, Crawford worked again as a surveyor, locating lands for settlers and speculators. Governor Robert Dinwiddie had promised bounty land to the men of the Washington's Virginia Regiment for their service in the French and Indian War. In 1770 Crawford and Washington travelled down the Ohio River to choose the land to be given to the regiment's veterans. The area selected was near what is now Point Pleasant, West Virginia. Crawford also made a western scouting trip in 1773 under the approval of Lord Dunmore, Governor of Virginia which was led by Thomas Bullitt. The expedition of over 40 men included Joshua Morris, Capt. Matthew Arbuckle, John Alderson, and Colonel John Field. Washington could not accompany them because of the sudden death of his stepdaughter. During the expedition, Arkbuckle and Alderson found the Kanawha Burning Springs, who Thomas Hanson in 1774 described as "one of the wonders of the world. Put a blaze of pine within 3 or 4 inches of the water, and immediately the water will be in a flame, & Continue so until it is put out by the Force of wind. The Springs are small and boil continually like a Pot on the Fire; the water is black & has a Taste of Nitre."

At the outbreak of Dunmore's War in 1774, Crawford received a promotion to major from Lord Dunmore. He built Fort Fincastle at present Wheeling, West Virginia. He also led an expedition which destroyed two Mingo villages (near present Steubenville, Ohio) in retaliation for Chief Logan's raids into Virginia.

Crawford's service to Virginia in Dunmore's War was controversial in Pennsylvania, since the colonies were engaged in a bitter dispute over their borders near Fort Pitt. Crawford had been a justice of the peace in Pennsylvania since 1771, first for Bedford County, then for Westmoreland County when it was established in 1773. Beginning in 1776, Crawford served as a surveyor and justice for Virginia's short-lived Yohogania County.

== American Revolution ==
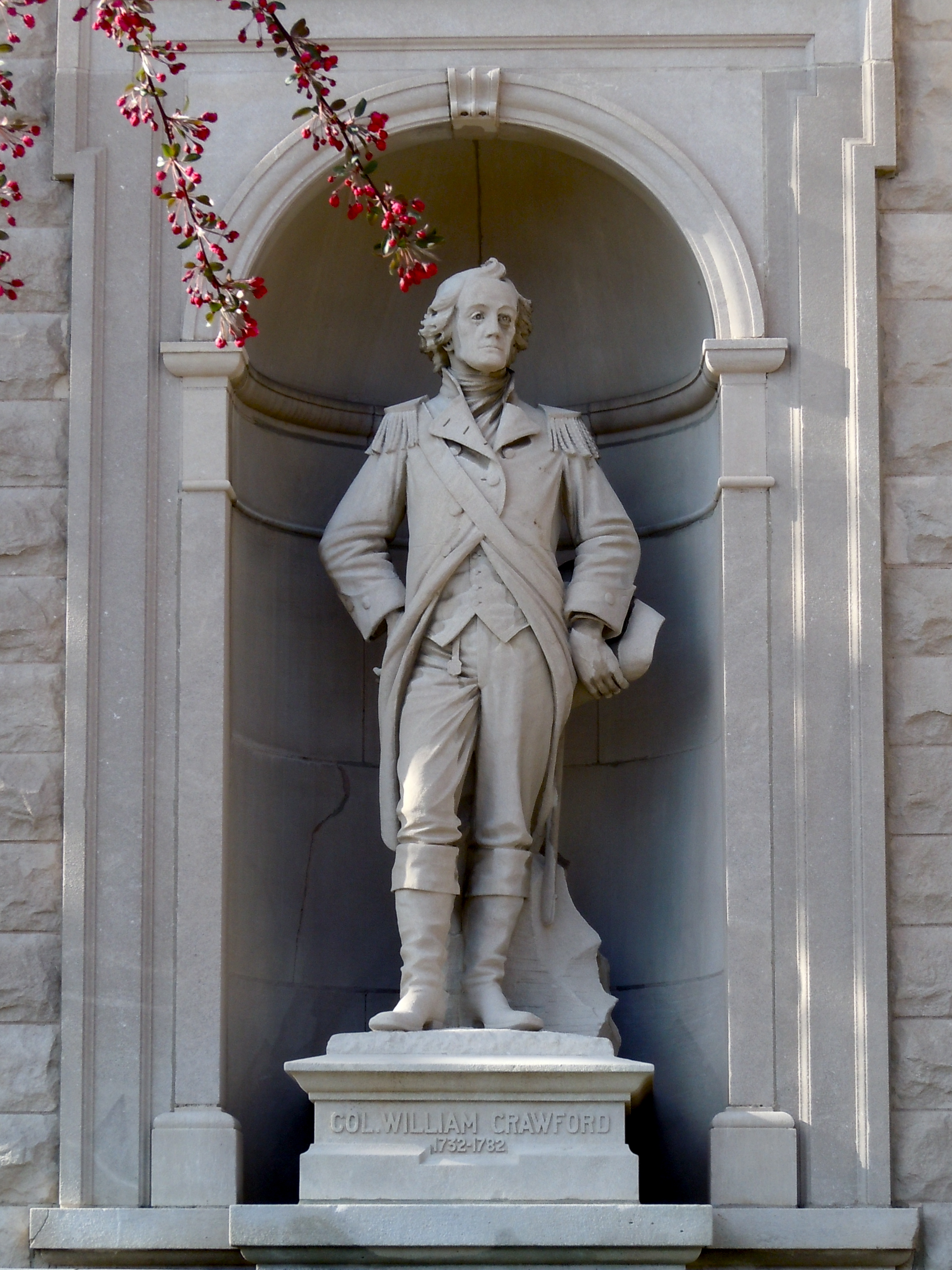
Statue of Crawford at the Crawford County Courthouse in Bucyrus, Ohio.

When the American Revolutionary War began, Crawford initially was commissioned a lieutenant colonel in the 5th Virginia Regiment on February 13, 1776. The 5th Virginia was raised in the Northern Neck, as well as counties around the city of Richmond City and Northern Virginia and initially was based in Williamsburg. where Crawford joined the regiment. Later that year, Crawford was promoted to Colonel of the 7th Virginia Regiment to fill a vacancy when Colonel William Daingerfield resigned his command of that unit.

A number of histories incorrectly state that Crawford raised the 7th Virginia Regiment near Fort Pitt at the beginning of the revolution. The 7th Virginia initially was raised in southeastern Virginia near Gloucester Court House. The confusion may be due to Crawford's role in raising another regiment near Fort Pitt, the 13th Virginia, which was redesignated the 9th Virginia in 1778 and later renumbered to the 7th Virginia in 1781 while it was stationed at Fort Pitt. Crawford commanded the 13th Virginia for a time in 1777.

Many histories also inaccurately state that Crawford led the 7th Virginia at the Battle of Long Island and the following retreat across New Jersey. Crawford's own words contradict this viewpoint in a letter written to George Washington from Williamsburg, VA on September 20, 1776: "I Should have com to new York with those Reget ordred their but the Regt I belong to is Ordred to this place." Regimental histories of the 7th Virginia along with other historical references also reveal that the 7th Virginia did not participate in the battle of Long Island. Similar uncertainty surrounds narratives that state Crawford was with Washington at the crossing of the Delaware and the Battles of Trenton and Princeton. Recent historians have sought to correct these inaccuracies, such as H. Ward in his biography of Revolutionary soldiers from Virginia: "It is disputed whether Crawford served in any part of the New York-New Jersey campaigns of 1776-1777…"

Crawford apparently left the command of the 7th Virginia in November 1776. A farewell letter to Crawford from the officers of the 7th Virginia was published in the Virginia Gazette newspaper on November 22, 1776. He responded with a letter of his own in the same edition of the Gazette, bidding farewell to the 7th Virginia.

He returned to his home on the frontier late in 1776 and was actively engaged in raising the 13th Virginia Regiment, which was authorized by Congress in September 1776 with recruiting beginning in December 1776 in the District of West Augusta of Virginia (this region was claimed by Virginia and encompassed parts of present day western Pennsylvania and West Virginia). Crawford wrote to Washington from Fredricktown Maryland on February 12, 1777, to inform him he was coming from the frontier, where the officers of the regiment already had recruited about 500 men. He was on his way to Congress to seek funding for arms and supplies and then planned to immediately return home. The Continental Congress resolved on February 17, 1777: "That 20,000 dollars be paid to Colonel William Crawford for raising and equipping the regiment under his command, part of the Virginia new levies."

The 13th Virginia, or West Augusta regiment, was raised on the condition that it remain in the West in the event of an Indian War. However, with Washington's need for reinforcements in the East, the Continental Congress on January 8, 1777, requested the governor of Virginia to order the West Augusta regiment to join Washington in New Jersey. But with increased attacks on frontier settlements by Native Americans allied with the British in early 1777, a Council of War was held at Fort Pitt on March 24, 1777, that decided the 13th Virginia should not be deployed to the East at that time. Crawford wrote to Congress on April 22, 1777: "Honorable Sir—Having received orders to join his Excellency General Washington in the Jerseys with the battalion now under my command, which orders I would willingly have obeyed, had not a council of war held at this place (proceedings of which were transmitted to Congress by express) resolve that I should remain here until further orders." However, Colonel William Russell was now commander of the 13th Virginia and on June 9, 1777 a detachment of the regiment under Major Charles Simms marched eastward to Philadelphia. Colonel Russell apparently led another detachment of the 13th Virginia eastward in July after he was inoculated for smallpox. Likewise, Crawford may have brought a number of recruits with him when he joined Washington in July or August 1777.

During the Philadelphia campaign, Crawford was placed in command of a scouting detachment as part of the light infantry corps for Washington's army. General William Maxwell commanded the light infantry and Crawford was selected to serve as one of the field officers under Maxwell. William Walker, a member of the light infantry, described Crawford in the typical attire of a frontier rifleman: "…Colonel Crawford with his leather hunting shirt, pantaloons and Rifle…" The British forces, after landing near Head of Elk, Maryland, approached Philadelphia from the south through Delaware. Washington sent Maxwell's Light Infantry to delay the British march along the main road to Wilmington at a crossing of the Christiana Creek known as Cooch's Bridge. On September 3, 1777, the fighting was intense between Maxwell's light infantry and the British vanguard, as John Chilton of the 3rd Virginia Regiment recorded in his Diary: "3d Septr. - The enemy advanced as high as the red Lion, they were met with by our advanced party under Colo Crawford – the engagement was pretty hot. several on each side was wounded and some slain." Being outnumbered and outgunned, the light infantry was driven from Cooch's Bridge and fell back to the main American lines near Wilmington, Delaware.

Crawford continued to serve in the light infantry corps at the battles of Brandywine and Germantown. On October 11, 1777, militia units from the Virginia counties of Prince William, Culpepper, Loudoun, and Berkley were formed into a brigade and placed under Crawford's command. However, as the war on the western frontier intensified late in 1777, Crawford was transferred to the Western Department of the Continental Army. On November 20, 1777, Congress requested that Washington "send Col. Wm. Crawford to Pittsburg to take command, under Brig. Gen. Hand, of the Continental troops and militia in the Western Department." He served at Fort Pitt under Generals Edward Hand and Lachlan McIntosh. Crawford was present at the Treaty of Fort Pitt in 1778, and helped to build Fort Laurens and Fort McIntosh that year. Resources were scarce on the frontier, however, and Fort Laurens was abandoned in 1779. In 1780, Crawford visited Congress to appeal for more funds for the western frontier. In 1781, he retired from military service.

== Crawford Expedition ==
In 1782, General William Irvine persuaded Crawford to lead an expedition against enemy Native American villages along the Sandusky River. Before leaving, on May 16 he made out his will and testament. His son John Crawford, his son-in-law William Harrison, and his nephew and namesake William Crawford also joined the expedition.

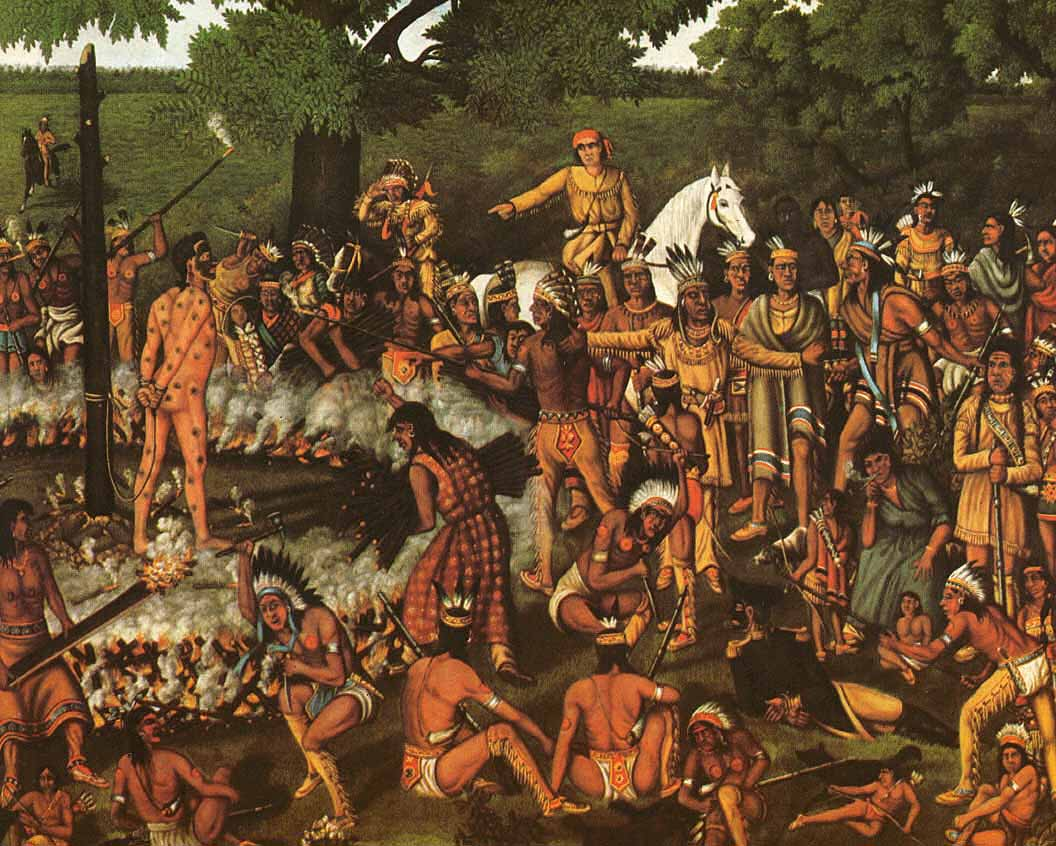
Execution of Crawford

Crawford led about 500 volunteers deep into American Indian territory with the hope of surprising them. However, the Indians and their British allies at Detroit had learned about the expedition in advance, and brought about 440 men to the Sandusky to oppose the Americans. After a day of indecisive fighting, the Americans found themselves surrounded. During a confused retreat, Crawford and dozens of his men were captured. The Delaware Nation tribes tortured and executed many of the men. Crawford's execution was brutal, and was overseen by Simon Girty, a former soldier under Crawford's command who deserted his post after being wanted for high treason in 1778 for acting as an enemy of the state while serving in the militia (the order was signed by Timothy Matlack, and George Bryan). Crawford was tortured for at least two hours before he was burned at the stake. His nephew and son-in-law were also captured and executed. The war ended shortly thereafter, but Crawford's horrific execution was widely publicized in the United States, worsening the already strained relationship between Native Americans and European Americans.

== Legacy ==
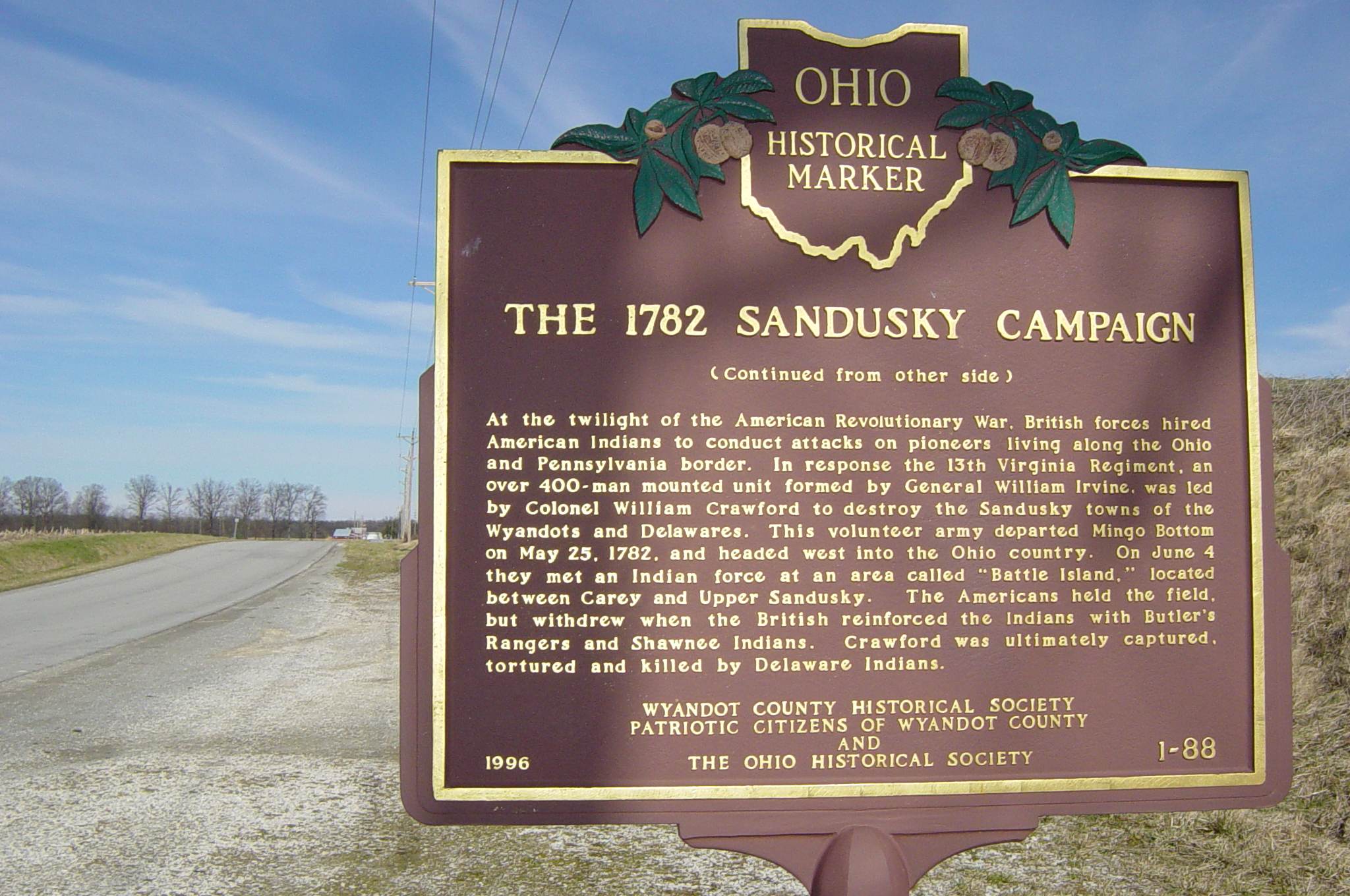
The Ohio Historical Society's marker near the Colonel Crawford Burn Site Monument in Wyandot County, Ohio

In 1982, the site of Colonel Crawford's execution was added to the National Register of Historic Places. In 1877, the Pioneer Association of Wyandot County erected an 8.5 ft (2.6 m) Berea sandstone monument near the site. The Ohio Historical Society also has an historical marker nearby.

Crawford County, Ohio, Crawford County, Pennsylvania, Crawford County, Michigan, and Crawford County, Indiana, are named for William Crawford. So too is Colonel Crawford High School in North Robinson, Ohio.

There is a replica of Crawford's cabin in Connellsville, Pennsylvania.

Crawford's half-brother, James Stevenson, was a member of the Pennsylvania State Senate.
