= Thomas Parke =

Thomas Parke may refer to:

- Thomas Parke (physician) (1749-1783), American physician
- Thomas Parke (architect) (1793–1864), architect, builder, journalist and political figure in Upper Canada
- Thomas Parke (merchant) (1729–1819), Liverpool merchant, banker and privateer
- Thomas Parke (Royal Marines officer) (1780–1858), officer in the Royal Marines
- Thomas Heazle Parke (1857–1893), Irish doctor, explorer, soldier and naturalist
