= 1837 Spanish general election =

← October 1836	19 November 1837	1839 →

All 241 seats of the Congress of Deputies 121 seats needed for a majority
- Turnout: 55.43%
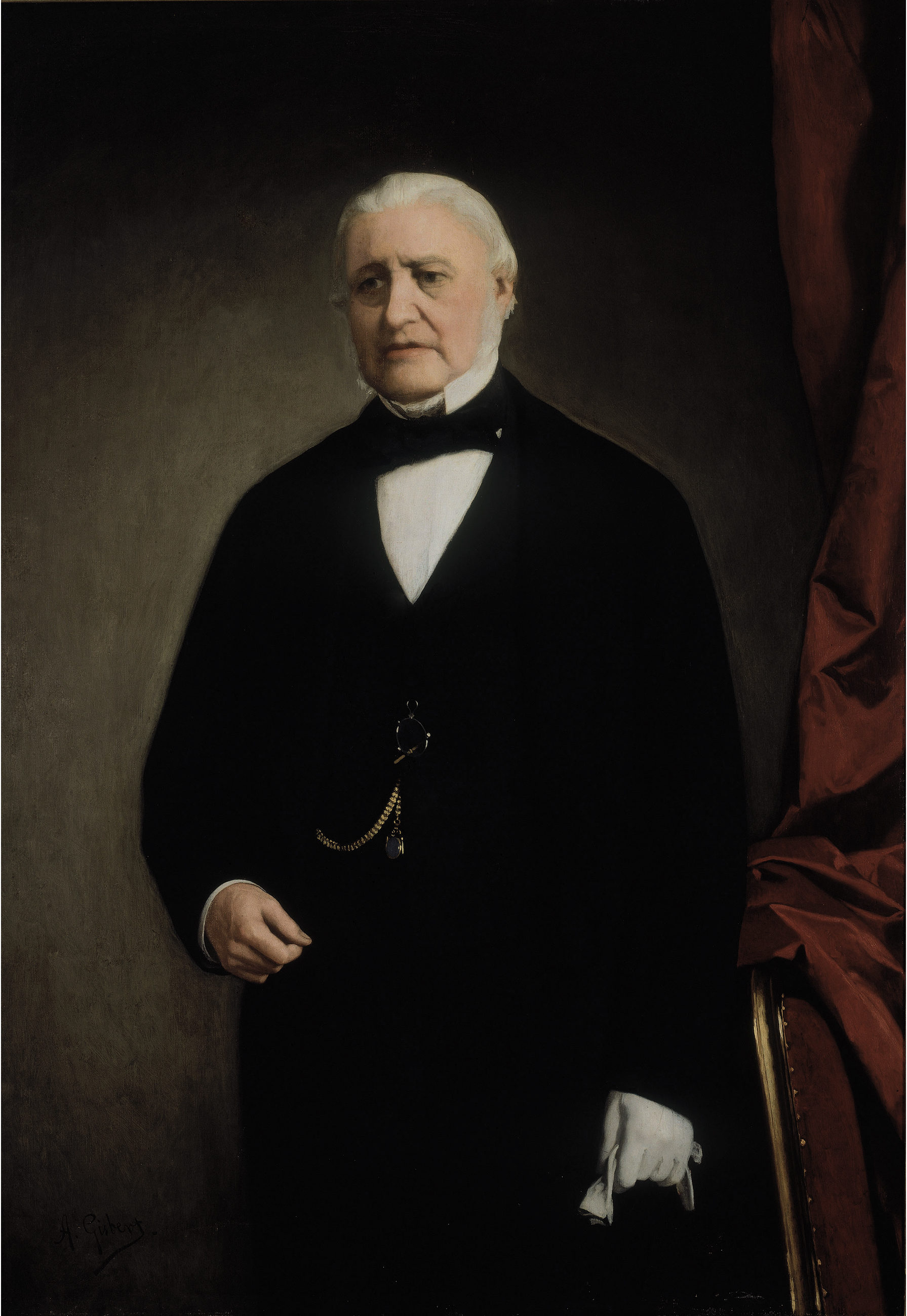

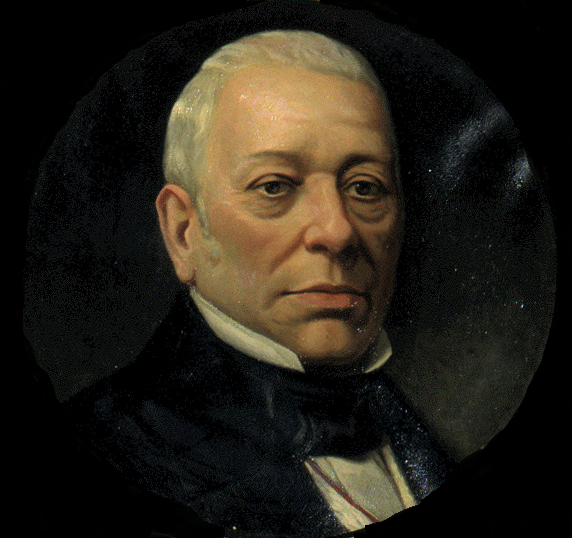
	First party	Second party	Third party
Leader		Francisco Javier de Istúriz	Vicente Sancho y Cobertores
Party	Independents	Moderate	Progressive Party
Leader's seat		Madrid	Madrid
Seats won	94	88	59
Prime Minister before election
Baldomero Espartero
Progressive Party
Prime Minister after election
Eusebio Bardají Azara
Moderate Party

General elections to the Cortes Generales were held in Spain in November 1837. At stake were all 241 seats in the Congress of Deputies.

== Electoral system ==
=== Voting rights ===
Restricted census suffrage, only 262,000 people out of a total population of 12,162,872 were allowed to vote. The elections were held on 22 September, at the peak of the First Carlist War.

=== Constituencies ===
A majority voting system was used for the election, with 51 multi-member constituencies and 1 single-member constituency. Voting was secret and direct.

== Results ==
Party	Seats
Other and independents	94
Moderate Party	88
Progressive Party	59
Total	241
