= 7th Virginia Regiment =

- Active: 1776–1783
- Allegiance: Continental Congress of the United States
- Type: Infantry
- Part of: Virginia Line
- Engagements: Battle of Long Island, Battle of Trenton, Battle of Brandywine, Battle of Germantown, Battle of Monmouth, Siege of Charleston, Waxhaw Massacre

Commanders
- Notable commanders: Col. William Dangerfield (2/29/1776-8/13/1776; resigned), Capt. Thomas Posey (3/20/1776-3/10/1783); Col. William Crawford (8/14/1776-3/4/1777; resigned), Col. Alexander McClanachan (10/17/1776-5/13/1778; resigned), Lt. Col. Holt Richeson (5/14/1778-9/14/1778; transferred to 5th Virginia Regiment), Col. William Russell (9/14/1778-1/1/1783)

The 7th Virginia Regiment was raised on January 11, 1776, at Gloucester, Virginia, for service with the Continental Army. It served at the Battle of Long Island in fall of 1776 as well as the Battle of Trenton later on December 26, 1776. The regiment would also see action at the Battle of Brandywine, Battle of Germantown (after which it wintered at Valley Forge), Battle of Monmouth and the Siege of Charleston. Most of the regiment was captured at Charlestown, South Carolina, on May 12, 1780, by the British and the regiment was formally disbanded on January 1, 1783. A 3rd Virginia Detachment made up of the 7th Virginia Regiment was at the Battle of Waxhaws in 1780.
