= Thomas Parke (physician) =

American physician 1749–1835

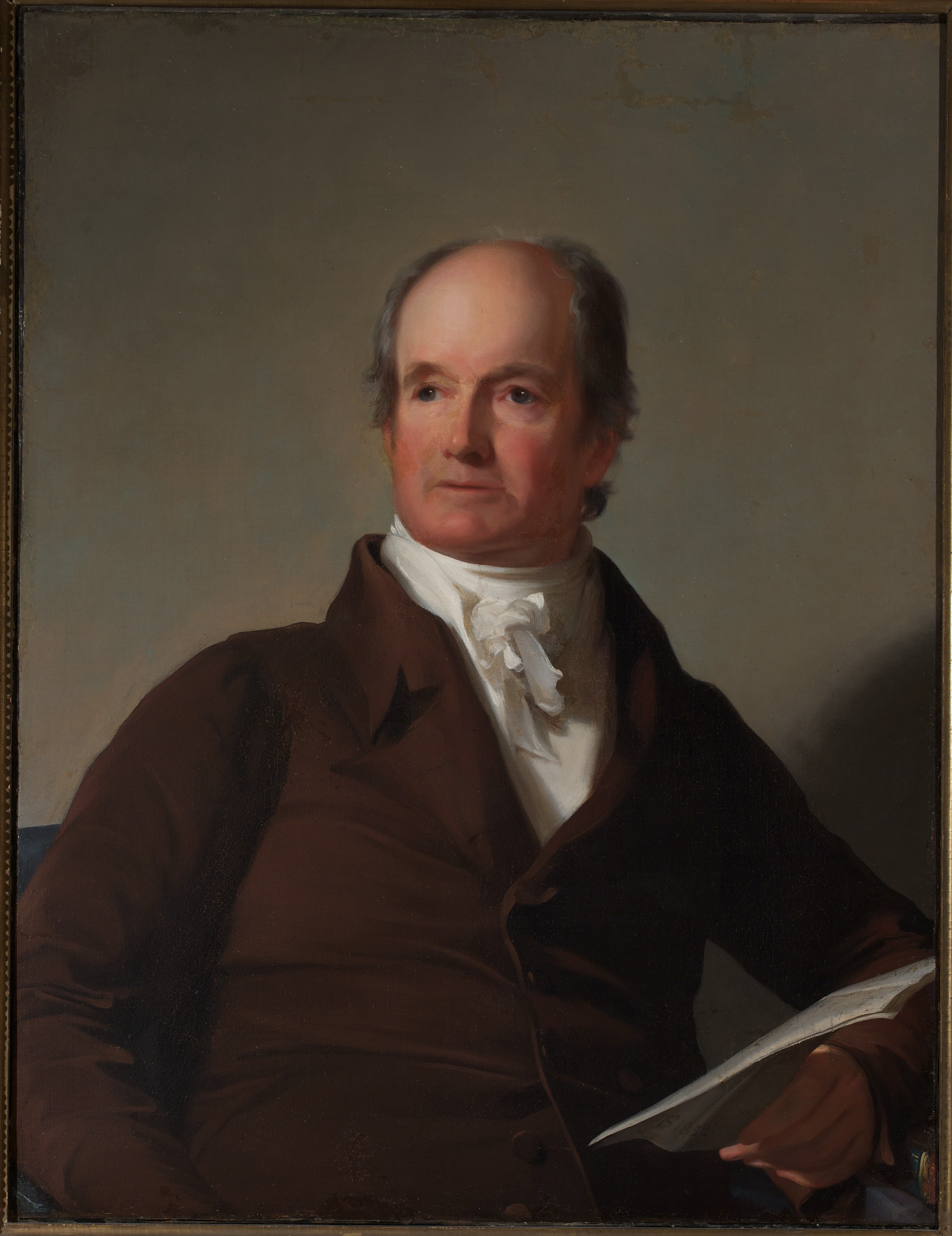
Photo of Thomas Parke

Thomas Parke (6 August 1749 — 9 January 1835) was an American medical doctor.

He was born to an Irish Quaker family in Chester County, PA, and was urged to study medicine in Philadelphia by his brother-in-law Owen Biddle. At the age of sixteen, Parke moved to Philadelphia, and studied at the school of Robert Proud, initially, then studied medicine under Cadwalder Evans. After attending lectures at the College of Physicians of Philadelphia, including classes taught by Benjamin Rush, Parke graduated in 1770.

After further studies abroad at hospitals in London and Edinburgh, he returned to Philadelphia and started practicing medicine with his former teacher, Dr. Evans. He inherited the practice just three months later after the death of Evans, and Parke’s patients and peers praised him as a safe and kind doctor. He was elected as a member to the American Philosophical Society in 1774.

In 1775, he married Rachel Pemberton, the daughter of James Pemberton; Parke later advocated for his father during his 1777 treason trial.

Parke was instrumental in the development of the Library Company of Philadelphia, serving as the Director, then a board member, and on many committees over his fifty-seven years of involvement. He was elected as a curator of the APS in 1795, but did not attend meetings frequently. Additionally, he served as a Manager at Pennsylvania Hospital, and was the President of the College of Physicians from 1818 until his death.
