= 1839 Spanish general election =

← 1837	24 July 1839	1840 →

All 241 seats of the Congress of Deputies 121 seats needed for a majority
- Turnout: 64.6%
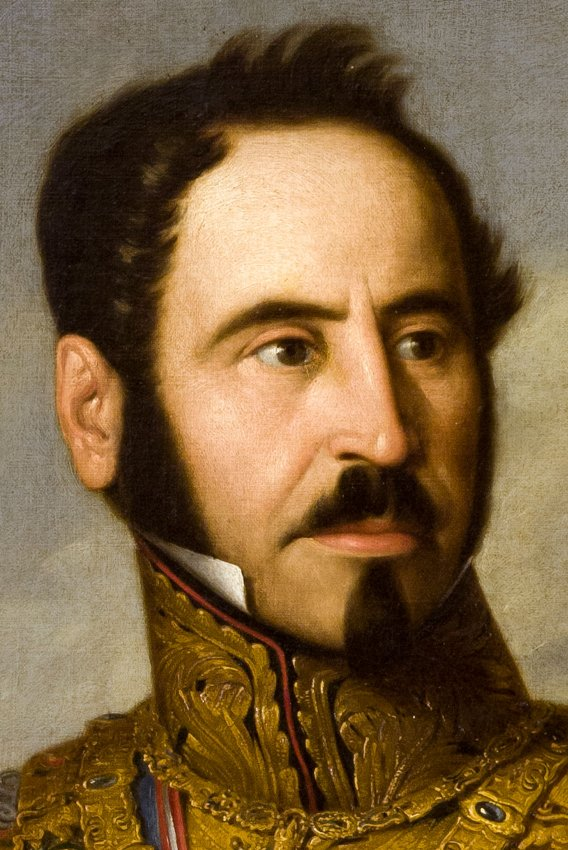

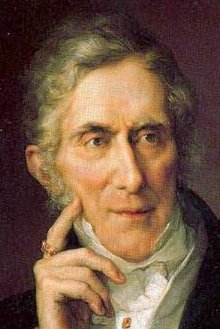
	First party	Second party	Third party
Leader	Baldomero Espartero		Evaristo Pérez de Castro
Party	Progressive Party	Independents	Moderate
Leader's seat	Madrid		Madrid
Seats won	115	98	28
Prime Minister before election
Evaristo Pérez de Castro
Moderate Party
Prime Minister after election
Evaristo Pérez de Castro
Moderate Party

General elections to the Cortes Generales were held in Spain on 24 July 1839. At stake were all 241 seats in the Congress of Deputies.

== Electoral system ==
=== Voting rights ===
Restricted census suffrage, only 376,255 people out of a total population of 12,162,872 were allowed to vote.

=== Constituencies ===
A majority voting system was used for the election, with 48 multi-member constituencies and 1 single-member constituency. Voting was secret and direct.

== Results ==
Party	Seats
Progressive Party	115
Other and independents	98
Moderate Party	28
Total	241
