= Isaac Weaver Jr. =

American politician

Member of the Pennsylvania House of Representatives
- In office 1787 – March 1, 1803

63rd Speaker of the Pennsylvania House of Representatives
- In office November 5, 1800 – March 1, 1803
- Preceded by: Cadwalader Evans
- Succeeded by: Simon Snyder

6th Treasurer of Pennsylvania
- In office 1802–1807
- Governor: Thomas McKean
- Preceded by: Jacob Carpenter
- Succeeded by: William Findlay

Member of the Pennsylvania Senate for the 18th district
- In office 1809–1812
- Preceded by: James Stevenson
- Succeeded by: Abel McFarland
- In office 1817–1820
- Preceded by: Abel McFarland
- Succeeded by: Rees Bowen Hill

Personal details
- Born: March 1, 1756
- Died: May 2, 1830 (aged 74) Waynesburg, Pennsylvania
- Party: Democratic-Republican Party
- Spouse: Abigail Price
- Profession: Schoolmaster

Isaac Weaver Jr. (March 1, 1756 – May 2, 1830) was an American politician from Pennsylvania who served as a Democratic-Republican member of the Pennsylvania House of Representatives 1797 to 1803, including as Speaker from 1800 to 1803. He was an unsuccessful candidate for the U.S. House in 1801, and the U.S. Senate in 1801, 1802, 1812, 1819, and 1824. He resigned as Speaker on March 1, 1803, to take the office of Pennsylvania Treasurer, at that time an office elected by the General Assembly.

He served as a member of the Pennsylvania Senate for the 18th district from 1809 to 1812 and again from 1817 to 1820 as Speaker of the Senate.

== Early life ==
He was born in Providence Township, Pennsylvania, on March 1, 1756, to Isaac and Sarah Dell Weaver. He received his education in Philadelphia, Pennsylvania and became a schoolmaster.

He served as a captain in the Chester County Militia during the American Revolutionary War. After the war, he married Abigail Price and together they had eleven children. He moved to Waynesburg, Pennsylvania. His first wife Abigail died in 1813 and he was remarried to Rachel Husbands.

== Death and burial ==
He died in Waynesburg, Pennsylvania, on May 2, 1830, and was originally interred at the family farm near Castle Run in Greene County, Pennsylvania. His remains were later exhumed and reinterred at the Jefferson Cemetery in Jefferson, Pennsylvania.

== See also ==
- Speaker of the Pennsylvania House of Representatives

Pennsylvania House of Representatives
Preceded by	Member of the Pennsylvania House of Representatives; 1797-1803	Succeeded by
Preceded by Cadwalader Evans	Speaker of the Pennsylvania House of Representatives; 1800-1803	Succeeded by Simon Snyder
Political offices
Preceded by Jacob Carpenter	Treasurer of Pennsylvania; 1802–1807	Succeeded by William Findlay
Pennsylvania State Senate
Preceded by district created	Member of the Pennsylvania Senate, 18th district 1809-1812	Succeeded by Abel McFarland
Preceded by Abel McFarland	Member of the Pennsylvania Senate, 18th district 1817-1820	Succeeded by Rees Bowen Hill
