= James Stevenson (Pennsylvania politician) =

Politician

Member of the Pennsylvania House of Representatives from Washington County
- In office 1814–1816
- In office 1806–1808

Member of the Pennsylvania Senate from the 18th district
- In office 1808–1810
- Preceded by: William McArthur Sr.
- Succeeded by: Isaac Weaver Jr.

Personal details
- Born: 1740 Frederick County, Virginia (today Berkeley County, West Virginia)
- Died: 1813 (aged 72–73) Cross Creek, Pennsylvania
- Party: Democratic-Republican
- Spouse(s): Rachel McKeevers Stephenson (d. December 14, 1789); Martha Barr Stephenson
- Children: 8

Military service
- Branch/service: United States
- Years of service: American Revolutionary War
- Rank: Captain

James Stevenson (1740–1813) (also spelled Stephenson) was an American politician from Virginia that would go on to represent the 18th district in the Pennsylvania State Senate, as well as representing Washington County in the Pennsylvania House of Representatives as a Democratic-Republican. Stevenson was one of the close childhood friends of George Washington and served as a Captain during the American Revolutionary War for the Continental Army.

== Biography ==
James Stephenson was born in Frederick County, Virginia, in what is now Berkeley County, West Virginia, in 1740 to Richard and Honora Stephenson née Grymes. In 1767 Stephenson married Rachel Stephenson née McKeevers and the couple had two sons, Moses, and William, and a daughter Theodosia. Stephenson was a veteran of the American Revolutionary War serving as a Captain and paymaster of the 13th Virginia Regiment. James also had a brother, William Stephenson, who served as a Lieutenant during the Illinois campaign under George Rogers Clark. Stephenson also had a half brother, William Crawford a war-hero from the French and Indian War who led the ill-fated Crawford expedition, resulting in his defeat at the Sandusky and subsequent capture by the Delaware Nation who tortured him for two hours before burning him at a stake. Crawford was the son of Honora to her earlier husband, Hugh Crawford, an Indian trader. Prior to Crawford's death, a young George Washington would often visit the Stephenson household, and would become a childhood friend of James.

In 1781 Stephenson left Virginia for Western Pennsylvania due to the vast abundance of cheap land taking with him his only slave named "Fortune" who was previously owned by George Washington and was given to Stephenson as a gift. Stephenson and Fortune traveled on foot the entire distance and established a 500-acre farm and built a cabin on the property before leaving Fortune in charge of the estate by himself and returned to Virginia to make the trip again but with his family. On December 14, 1789, Stephenson's wife Rachel died and he remarried to one Martha née Barr, the couple had four sons, Benjamin "James", Richard, Joseph, and John, as well as a daughter Achsah.

Stephenson's first entry into politics was an unsuccessful bid for Washington County commissioner in 1792. He would be elected as a Conventionalist Democratic-Republican to the Pennsylvania State House of Representatives from 1806 to 1808 when he was elected to the Pennsylvania state senate for the 18th district for a single term from 1808 to 1810. After a brief hiatus he returned to the house from 1814 to 1816. After-which he would unsuccessfully run for Sheriff of Washington county in 1820.

There is a discrepancy in Stephenson's death, as he was reported dead in May 1813, however, he would stand for four subsequent elections from 1814 to 1820. Stephenson is buried in the Cross Creek cemetery. Stephenson's second wife Martha would die in 1816.

== Electoral history ==
1820 election for Sheriff of Washington County (Note: Despite Stephenson death being recorded in 1813, he is still listed as a candidate in this election)
| Party | Candidate | Votes | % |
|---|---|---|---|
| Independent | Robert Officer | 1,779 | 25.24% |
| Independent | Jacob Weirich Jr. | 726 | 10.30% |
| Independent | Samuel Hill | 694 | 9.85% |
| Independent | Thomas Ringland | 672 | 9.53% |
| Independent | James Dunlap | 633 | 8.98% |
| Independent | John Marshel | 536 | 7.60% |
| Independent | John Morgan | 434 | 6.16% |
| Independent | William Hoge | 415 | 5.89% |
| Independent | John Greer | 361 | 5.12% |
| Independent | James Stephenson | 228 | 3.23% |
| Independent | Moses Lyle | 172 | 2.44% |
| Independent | William Carter | 142 | 2.02% |
| Independent | James Lattimer | 136 | 1.94% |
| Independent | Robert Forsyth | 67 | 0.95% |
| Independent | James Ashbrook | 54 | 0.75% |
| Total votes | | 7,049 | 100.0% |

1815 Pennsylvania House of Representatives election for Washington County (Note: Top four candidates elected to the State House. All candidates elected unopposed. Votes and party affiliation not recorded)
| Party | Candidate | Votes | % |
|---|---|---|---|
| Independent | John Hamilton | | |
| Independent | Thomas Morgan | | |
| Independent | James Stephenson | | |
| Independent | William Vance | | |

1814 election for Sheriff of Washington County
| Party | Candidate | Votes | % |
|---|---|---|---|
| Independent | Thomas Officer | 1,603 | 40.02% |
| Independent | Dickerson Roberts | 1,267 | 31.63% |
| Independent | Thomas Hopkins | 628 | 15.67% |
| Independent | James Stephenson | 508 | 12.68% |
| Total votes | | 4,006 | 100.0% |

1814 Pennsylvania House of Representatives election for Washington County (Note: Top four candidates elected to the State House. Party affiliation not recorded)
| Party | Candidate | Votes | % |
|---|---|---|---|
| Independent | Joshua Dickerson | 3,018 | 24.58% |
| Independent | James Stephenson | 2,330 | 18.98% |
| Independent | Thomas Morgan | 2,126 | 17.31% |
| Independent | Andrew Sutton | 2,065 | 16.82% |
| Independent | James Kerr | 1,086 | 8.85% |
| Independent | Robert Anderson | 1,020 | 8.30% |
| Independent | Robert Boland | 634 | 5.16% |
| Total votes | | 12,279 | 100.0% |

1813 Pennsylvania House of Representatives election for Washington County (Note: Top four candidates elected to the State House. All members elected unopposed, vote counts not recorded)
| Party | Candidate | Votes | % |
|---|---|---|---|
| Democratic-Republican | Joshua Dickerson | | |
| Democratic-Republican | Thomas MacCall | | |
| Democratic-Republican | James Kerr | | |
| Democratic-Republican | James Stevenson | | |

1808 Pennsylvania State Senate election for the 18th district (Note: Top two candidates elected to State Senate)
| Party | Candidate | Votes | % |
|---|---|---|---|
| Democratic-Republican | Isaac Weaver, Jr. | 4,886 | 41.45% |
| Democratic-Republican | James Stevenson | 4,415 | 37.46% |
| Federalist | John Marshall | 1,404 | 11.91% |
| Federalist | John Flanagan | 1,082 | 9.18% |
| Total votes | | 11,787 | 100% |

1807 Pennsylvania House of Representatives election for Washington County (Note: Top four candidates elected to the State House)
| Party | Candidate | Votes | % |
|---|---|---|---|
| Democratic-Republican | James Kerr | 1,897 | 24.11% |
| Democratic-Republican | Abel MacFarland | 1,058 | 13.44% |
| Democratic-Republican | James Stevenson | 1,053 | 13.38% |
| Democratic-Republican | Ebenezer Jennings | 1,025 | 13.02% |
| Federalist | John Marshall | 962 | 12.22% |
| Federalist | John Lyle | 944 | 12.00% |
| Federalist | Robert Machan | 931 | 11.83% |
| Total votes | | 7,870 | 100% |

1806 Pennsylvania House of Representatives election for Washington County
| Party | Candidate | Votes | % |
|---|---|---|---|
| Democratic-Republican | James Stevenson | 1,804 | 25.52% |
| Democratic-Republican | Abel MacFarland | 1,735 | 24.53% |
| Democratic-Republican | Ebenezer Jennings | 1,497 | 21.17% |
| Democratic-Republican | James Kerr | 1,453 | 20.55% |
| Federalist | Thomas Hopkins | 582 | 8.23% |
| Total votes | | 7,071 | 100% |

1805 Pennsylvania House of Representatives election for Washington County
| Party | Candidate | Votes | % |
|---|---|---|---|
| Democratic-Republican | John Marshall | 2,281 | 17.55% |
| Democratic-Republican | Aaron Lyle | 2,166 | 16.66% |
| Democratic-Republican | James Stephenson | 2,152 | 16.55% |
| Democratic-Republican | Samuel Agnew | 2,126 | 16.36% |
| Federalist | William MacFarland | 1,002 | 7.71% |
| Federalist | John Hoge | 923 | 7.10% |
| Federalist | James Mitchell | 903 | 6.95% |
| Federalist | Thomas Patterson | 878 | 6.75% |
| Federalist | Samuel Black | 568 | 4.37% |
| Total votes | | 12,999 | 100% |

1804 Pennsylvania House of Representatives election for Washington County
| Party | Candidate | Votes | % |
|---|---|---|---|
| Democratic-Republican | John Marshall | | |
| Democratic-Republican | Samuel Agnew | | |
| Democratic-Republican | James Stephenson | | |
| Democratic-Republican | David Atcheson | | |
