= July 1836 Spanish general election =

← February 1836	13 July 1836	October 1836 →

All 258 seats of the Congress of Deputies 129 seats needed for a majority
- Turnout: ~69.8%
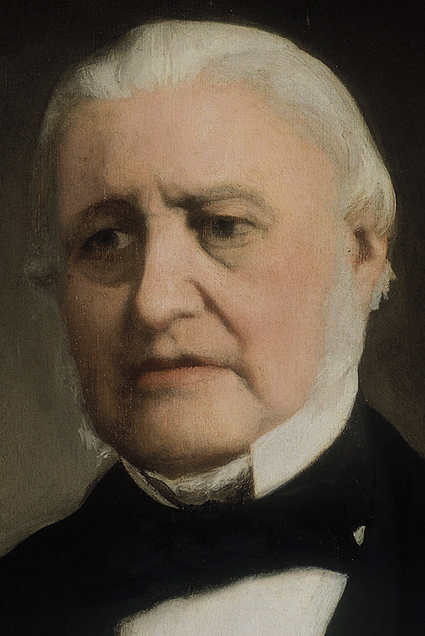

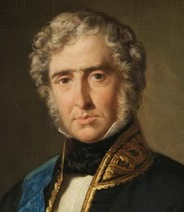
	First party	Second party
Leader	Francisco Javier de Istúriz	Juan Álvarez Mendizábal
Party	Moderate	Progressive Party
Leader's seat	Madrid	Madrid
Seats won	80	56
Prime Minister before election
Francisco Javier de Istúriz
Moderate Party
Prime Minister after election
Francisco Javier de Istúriz
Moderate Party

General elections to the Cortes Generales were held in Spain in July 1836. At stake were all 258 seats in the Congress of Deputies.

== History ==
The July 1836 elections were held under the Spanish Royal Statute of 1834, not under a full constitutional system. Only around 65,000 people were allowed to vote, out of a population of 12 million.

When the new Cortes held their first session, various uprisings erupted in several cities that Prime Minister Francisco Javier de Istúriz tried to control. In the royal palace of La Granja, where the opening session of the Parliament was being held, the royal guard rebelled on August 12, calling for the restoration of the Constitution of 1812. The Queen-Regent was forced to accede, Istúriz was dismissed and new elections were held on October.

== Constituencies ==
A majority voting system was used for the election, with 48 multi-member constituencies and 1 single-member constituency.

== Results ==
Party	Seats
Moderate Party	80
Progressive Party	56
Other and independents	122
Total	258
