= Cadwalader Evans =

American politician (1762–1841)

2nd Speaker of the Pennsylvania House of Representatives
- In office 1799–1841
- Preceded by: George Latimer
- Succeeded by: Isaac Weaver

Personal details
- Born: Dec 25, 1762 Gwynedd, Montgomery County, Pennsylvania, USA
- Died: October 26, 1841 (aged 78) 417 Arch Street, Philadelphia, Pennsylvania
- Party: Whig
- Spouse: Harriet Verena Musser
- Profession: worked as a surveyor in his early years

Cadwalader Evans (December 25, 1762 – October 26, 1841) was a member of the Pennsylvania House of Representatives and served as speaker in 1799.

== Pennsylvania House of Representatives ==
=== Elections (Montgomery County) ===
- 1795 (along with Joseph Tyson, John Shoemaker, Isaiah Davis)
- 1797 – 1,000 votes (along with Benjamin Brooke – 947, Peter Muhlenberg – 880, Nicholas Bellew – 866)

=== Speaker ===
Evans served as speaker of the House in 1799.

== Other activities ==
Elected President of the Schuylkill Navigation Company

- January 6, 1817 (Evans' father was one of the directors at the time)
- January 3, 1820 (Evans' father was one of the director at the time)
- January 3, 1825

In the Election of 1836, Evans served as a presidential elector for the Whig Party, specifically for William Henry Harrison as president and Francis Granger (New York) as Vice President.

He was apparently named as a Whig elector for the Election of 1840, but removed his name. The Clinton County Whig and Huntington Journal retained his space and replaced him with Thomas P. Cope.

== Retirement from public office ==
He spent a great deal of time reading. He was also actively involved in public internal improvements such as canals, specifically along the Schuylkill.

== Death ==
His last residence was 417 Arch Street, Philadelphia, Pennsylvania. He was interred at the Laurel Hill cemetery. The funeral started at his home at 10 am on October 29, 1841.

Evans' obituary refers to him as "unambitious and unobtrusive," saying that he was not concerned for his political party or his political life but rather for his country. It also states that as speaker of the Pennsylvania House of Representatives, he was complimented on his "energy, promptness, and able discharge of duty."

In his final months, he had heart problems. He did not complain or struggle in death. He spent a great deal of time with his children in his final months.

He Lived in Gwynedd, Pa. until 1812 when he moved to Philadelphia. He sold the old family homestead in Gwynedd, (which had been transmitted to him from his great grandfather, Cadwalader EVANS 1664–1745), in 1816 to Charles Willing Hare, Esq., of Philadelphia.

"He began his distinguished career about the 18th or 19th year of his age. One of his first engagements was surveying for the road jury, and laying out what is now called the "Lower State road", at least the western section of it terminating in what is now the Bethlehem turnpike. This was in 1786. He was a man of quick and clear perception, of ready utterance, and a powerful disputant; he was eminently gifted in conveyancing, and in drawing instruments of writing. "Historical Collections of Gwynedd" by H. M. Jenkins (1897)
