= William McArthur Sr. =

Politician

Crawford County Academy Trustee
- In office 1812–1822

Member of the Pennsylvania Senate from the 18th district
- In office 1801–1808
- Preceded by: District created
- Succeeded by: James Stevenson

Personal details
- Born: 1760 Ireland
- Died: 1822 (aged 61–62) Meadville, Pennsylvania
- Party: Democratic-Republican
- Spouse: Rebecca McClean McArthur
- Children: 7
- Occupation: Surveyor

William McArthur Sr. was an American politician from Crawford County, Pennsylvania who represented the county in the Pennsylvania State Senate for two terms from 1801 to 1808 as a Democratic-Republican.

== Biography ==
William McArthur Sr. was born in Ireland in 1760 to John and Sarah Rule McArthur. The McArthur family settled in the nascent United States during the closing days of the American Revolution, originally living in York. William worked as a teacher and a surveyor before moving to Western Pennsylvania where he laid out the town of Meadville on May 12, 1788, on behalf of General David Mead and was appointed the State district surveyor. On March 12, 1800, Crawford, Mercer, Venango, Warren, and Erie counties were separated from Allegheny and were temporarily one single county, Crawford County. McArthur would be elected for two terms to the Pennsylvania Senate to represent the new Crawford County from 1801 to 1808. He was also appointed the Crawford County Prothonotary, Register, and Recorder, by Governors Thomas McKean and Simon Snyder from 1801 to 1822. William McArthur Sr. would die in office in 1822.

== Personal life ==
William McArthur Sr. married Rebecca McClean in 1805, the daughter of the Scots-Irish Revolutionary war Colonel Moses McClean whose brothers helped survey the Mason–Dixon line. The couple had 7 children: William McArthur, Sarah Rule McArthur, Margaret Charlesworth McArthur, Rebecca Scott McArthur, Moses McClean McArthur, William McArthur Jr., and John McArthur.

== Electoral history ==
1820 Crawford County Academy Trustee
Party	Candidate	Votes	%
Independent	William MacArthur	483	27.66%
Independent	George Hurst	472	27.04%
Independent	Thomas Atkinson	399	22.85%
Independent	H. J. Huidekoper	392	22.45%
Total votes		1,746	100.0%

1812 Crawford County Academy Trustee
Party	Candidate	Votes	%
Democratic-Republican	William MacArthur	172	50.59%
Democratic-Republican	George Hurst	168	49.41%
Total votes		340	100.0%

1805 Pennsylvania State Senate election for the 18th District
Party	Candidate	Votes	%
Democratic-Republican	William MacArthur	1,420	53.93%
Democratic-Republican	Alexander Brown	1,213	46.07%
Total votes		2,633	100.0%

1801 Pennsylvania State Senate election for the 18th District
Party	Candidate	Votes	%
Democratic-Republican	William MacArthur	524	48.51%
Democratic-Republican	David Mead	241	22.35%
Federalist	Alexander W. Foster	226	20.91%
Federalist	William Bell	89	8.22%
Total votes		1,080	100.0%
