= 1836 Kentucky gubernatorial election =

- August 1, 1836
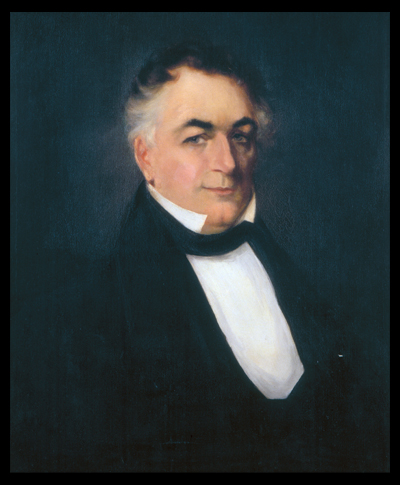

Nominee	James Clark	Matthews Flournoy
Party	Whig	Democratic
Popular vote	38,587	30,491
Percentage	55.86%	44.14%
- Flournoy: 50–60% 60–70% 70–80% 80–90% 90–100% Clark: 50–60% 60–70% 70–80% 80–90% No Data/Vote
Governor before election
James T. Morehead (Acting)
National Republican
Elected Governor
James Clark
Whig

The 1836 Kentucky gubernatorial election was held on August 1, 1836, to elect the next governor of Kentucky Whig candidate and former United States Representative from Kentucky's 3rd congressional district James Clark defeated Democratic candidate Matthews Flournoy.

== General election ==
On election day, August 1, 1836, Whig nominee James Clark won the election by a margin of 8,096 votes against his opponent Democratic nominee Matthews Flournoy, thereby gaining Whig control over the office of governor. Clark was sworn in as the 13th governor of Kentucky on August 23, 1836.

=== Results ===
Kentucky gubernatorial election, 1836
Party	Candidate	Votes	%
Whig	James Clark	38,587	55.86
Democratic	Matthews Flournoy	30,491	44.14
Total votes		69,078	100.00
Whig gain from National Republican			
