= 1836 Missouri lieutenant gubernatorial election =

- August 1, 1836

| Nominee | Franklin Cannon | James Jones |
| Party | Democratic | Whig |
| Popular vote | 13,942 | 10,210 |
| Percentage | 57.60% | 42.18% |
Lieutenant Governor before election
Lilburn Boggs
Democratic
Elected Lieutenant Governor
Franklin Cannon
Democratic

The 1836 Missouri lieutenant gubernatorial election was held on August 1, 1836, in order to elect the lieutenant governor of Missouri. Democratic nominee and incumbent member of the Missouri Senate Franklin Cannon defeated Whig nominee James Jones.

== General election ==
On election day, August 1, 1836, Democratic nominee Franklin Cannon won the election by a margin of 3,732 votes against his opponent Whig nominee James Jones, thereby retaining Democratic control over the office of lieutenant governor. Cannon was sworn in as the 5th lieutenant governor of Missouri on November 21, 1836.

=== Results ===
Missouri lieutenant gubernatorial election, 1836
| Party | Candidate | Votes | % |
|---|---|---|---|
| Democratic | Franklin Cannon | 13,942 | 57.60 |
| Whig | James Jones | 10,210 | 42.18 |
| | Scattering | 53 | 0.22 |
| Total votes | | 24,205 | 100.00 |
| Democratic hold | | | |

== See also ==
- 1836 Missouri gubernatorial election
