= 1836 New Jersey gubernatorial election =

- November 3, 1836
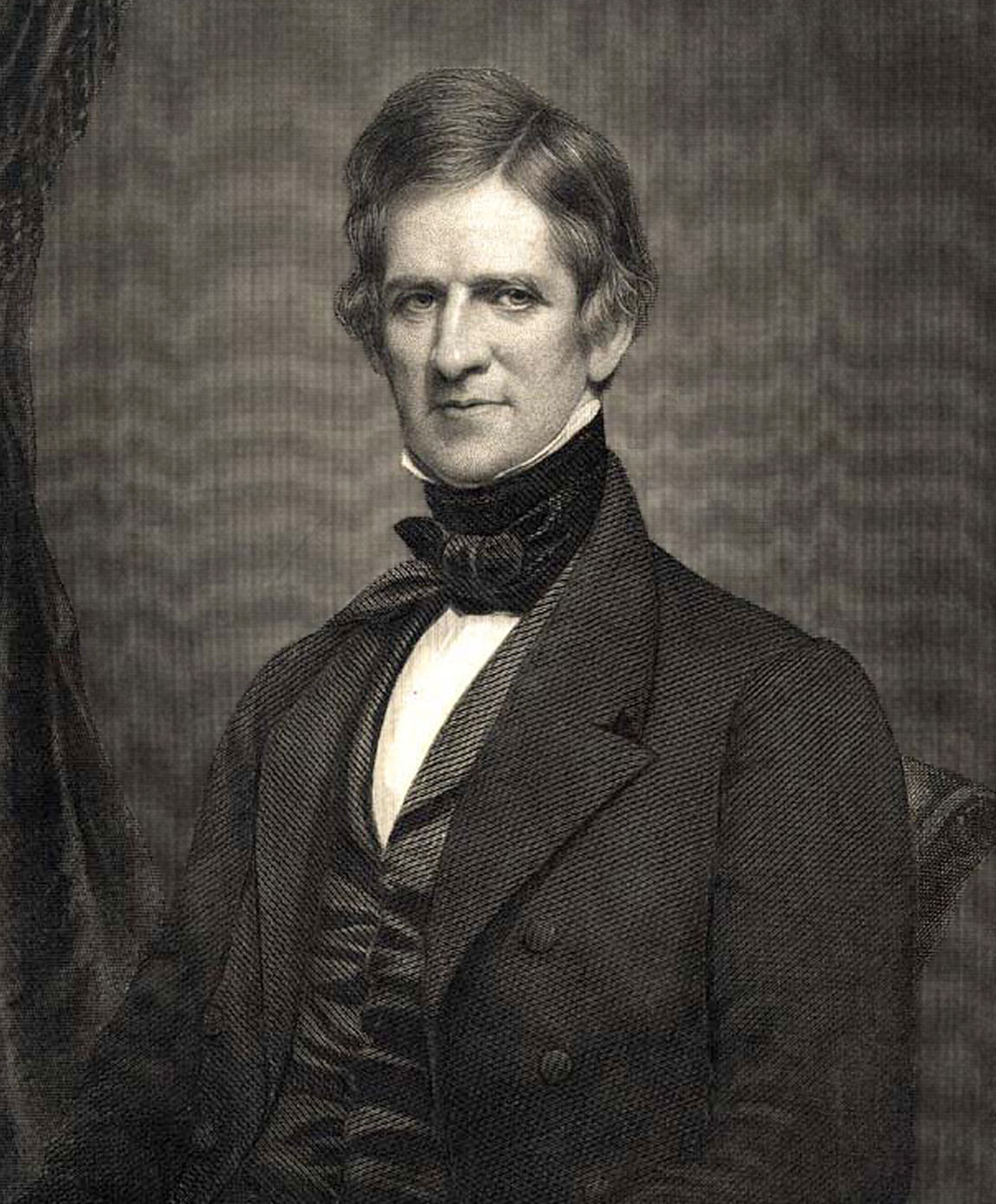

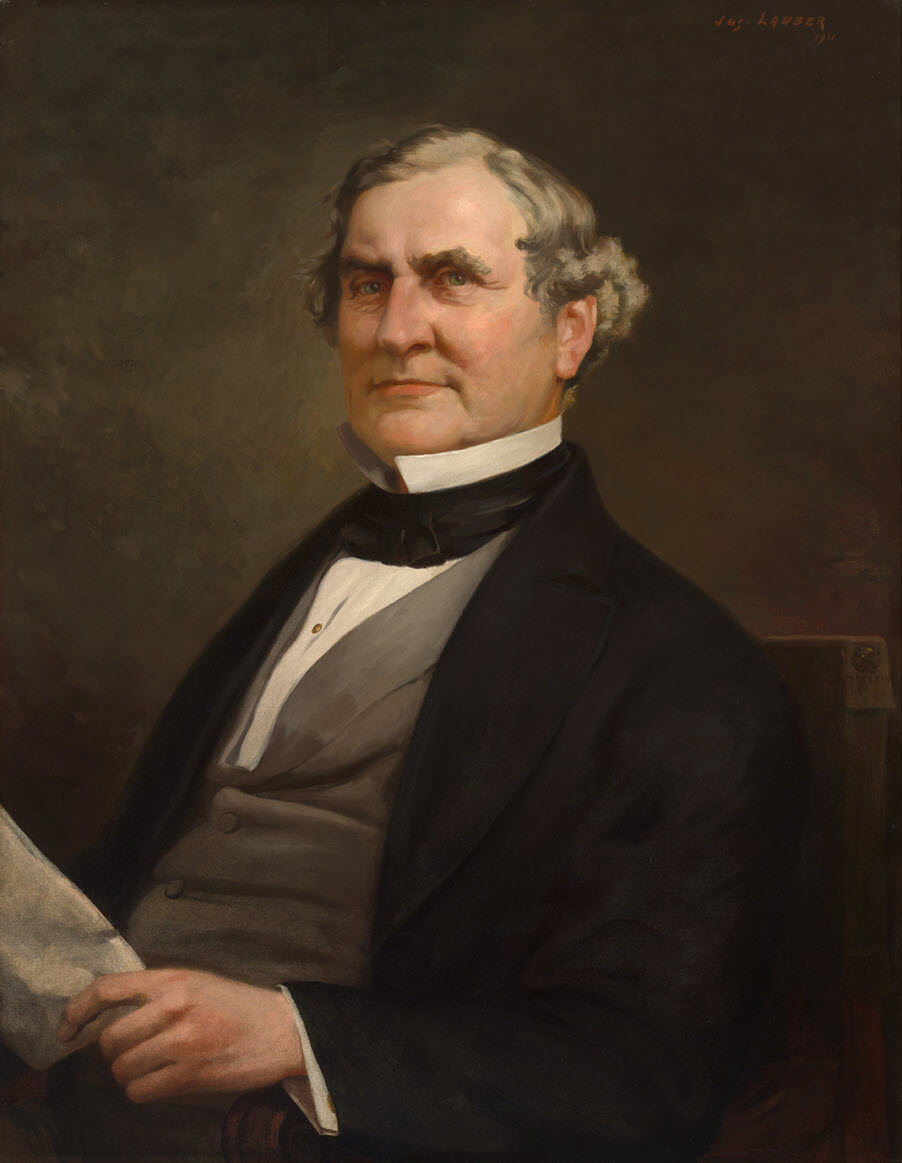
Nominee	Philemon Dickerson	William Pennington
Party	Democratic	Whig
Popular vote	33	25
Percentage	56.90%	43.10%
Governor before election
Peter Dumont Vroom
Democratic
Elected Governor
Philemon Dickerson
Democratic

The 1836 New Jersey gubernatorial election was held on November 3, 1836, in order to elect the governor of New Jersey. Democratic nominee and incumbent member of the U.S. House of Representatives from New Jersey's at-large district Philemon Dickerson was elected by the New Jersey General Assembly against Whig nominee and former member of the New Jersey General Assembly William Pennington. This second election was made necessary when previously elected Peter D. Vroom declined the office citing "ill health".

== General election ==
On election day, November 3, 1836, Democratic nominee Philemon Dickerson was elected by the New Jersey General Assembly against Whig nominee William Pennington, thereby retaining Democratic control over the office of governor. Dickerson was sworn in as the 12th governor of New Jersey that same day.

=== Results ===
New Jersey gubernatorial election, 1836
Party	Candidate	Votes	%
Democratic	Philemon Dickerson	33	56.90%
Whig	William Pennington	25	43.10%
Total votes		58	100.00%
Democratic hold			
