= February 1836 Spanish general election =

← 1834	26 February 1836	July 1836 →

All 149 seats of the Congress of Deputies 75 seats needed for a majority
- Turnout: N/A
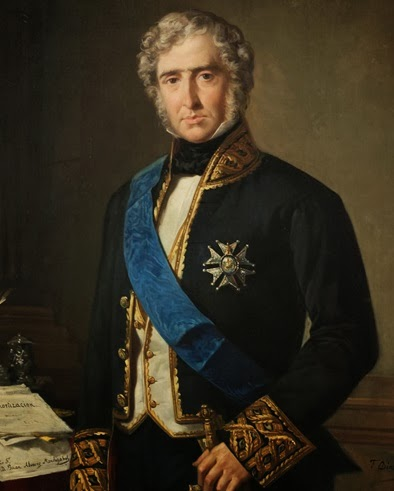

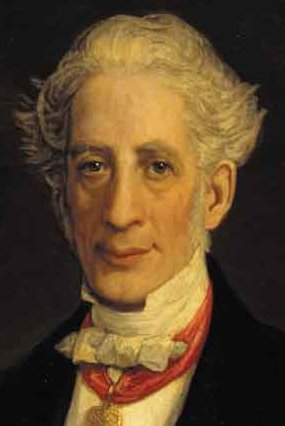
	First party	Second party
Leader	Juan Álvarez Mendizábal	Francisco Martínez de la Rosa
Party	Progressive Party	Moderate
Leader's seat	Madrid	Madrid
Seats won	119	30
Prime Minister before election
Juan Álvarez Mendizábal
Moderate Party
Prime Minister after election
Juan Álvarez Mendizábal
Moderate Party

General elections to the Cortes Generales were held in Spain in February 1836. At stake were all 149 seats in the Congress of Deputies.

== Constituencies ==
A majority voting system was used for the election, with 48 multi-member constituencies and 1 single-member constituency.

== Results ==
Party	Seats
Progressive Party	119
Moderate Party	30
Total	149
