= 1836 Ohio gubernatorial election =

- October 11, 1836
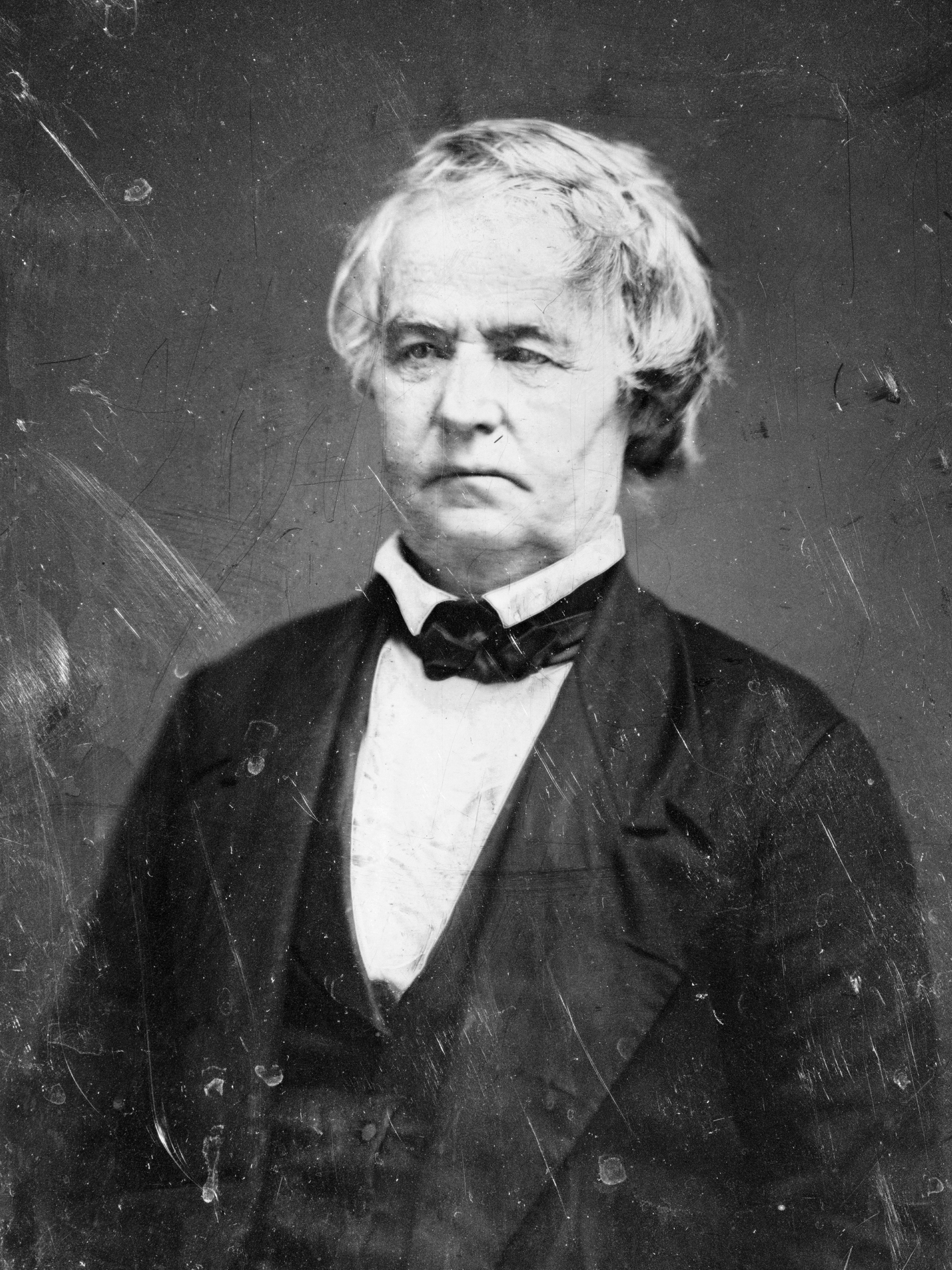

Nominee	Joseph Vance	Eli Baldwin
Party	Whig	Democratic
Popular vote	92,204	86,158
Percentage	51.64%	48.25%
County results
Vance
50–60%
60–70%
70–80%
Baldwin
50–60%
60–70%
70–80%
No data/vote
Governor before election
Robert Lucas
Democratic
Elected Governor
Joseph Vance
Whig

The 1836 Ohio gubernatorial election was held on October 11, 1836.

Incumbent Democratic Governor Robert Lucas did not run for re-election.

Whig nominee Joseph Vance defeated Democratic nominee Eli Baldwin with 51.64% of the vote.

== General election ==
=== Candidates ===
- Eli Baldwin, Democratic, farmer, former state senator, former judge of the Court of Common Pleas for Trumbull County
- Joseph Vance, Whig, former U.S. representative

=== Results ===
1836 Ohio gubernatorial election
Party	Candidate	Votes	%	±%
Whig	Joseph Vance	92,204	51.64%	
Democratic	Eli Baldwin	86,158	48.25%	
Scattering		200	0.11%	
Majority		6,046	3.39%	
Turnout		178,562		
Democratic gain from Whig		Swing		
