= 13th Virginia Regiment =

Continental Army infantry regiment

- Active: 1776–1783
- Allegiance: Continental Congress of the United States
- Type: Infantry
- Size: 728 soldiers
- Part of: Virginia Line
- Engagements: Battle of Brandywine, Battle of Germantown, Battle of Monmouth

The 13th Virginia Regiment was a United States infantry regiment during the American Revolutionary War.

== Summary ==
The 13th Virginia Regiment was authorized on 16 September 1776 by the Continental Congress for service with the Continental Army during the American Revolutionary War. The unit was organized on 12 February 1777 at Fort Pitt in present-day western Pennsylvania to consist of nine companies of troops from the far-western Virginia counties (now parts of West Virginia and western Pennsylvania). The regiment saw action in the Battle of Brandywine, Battle of Germantown, and the Battle of Monmouth. On 24 May 1778 the unit was assigned to the Western Department (Fort Laurens), and on 12 May 1779 it was reorganized and redesignated as the 9th Virginia Regiment. It was again reorganized and redesignated as the 7th Virginia Regiment on 1 January 1781 to consist of two companies. The regiment was disbanded at Fort Pitt on 1 January 1783.

== Notable members ==
Private James Amberson, previously of Capt. James O'Hara's Company of Regulars, was a messenger for General Irvine; he later served as a Captain in the Allegheny County Militia and was a noted scout and Indian fighter with Samuel Brady

Captain James Stevenson would go on to be elected to the Pennsylvania State House of Representatives and Pennsylvania State Senate.
