= October 1836 Spanish general election =

Spanish general election held in October 1836

- 17 October to 4 November 1836

All 242 seats of the Congress of Deputies 121 seats needed for a majority
- Turnout: N/A
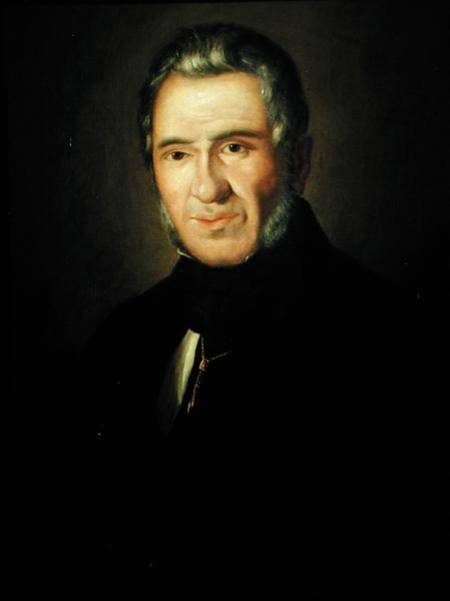

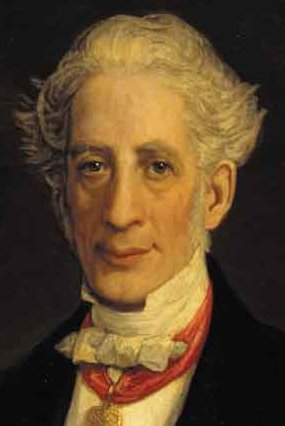

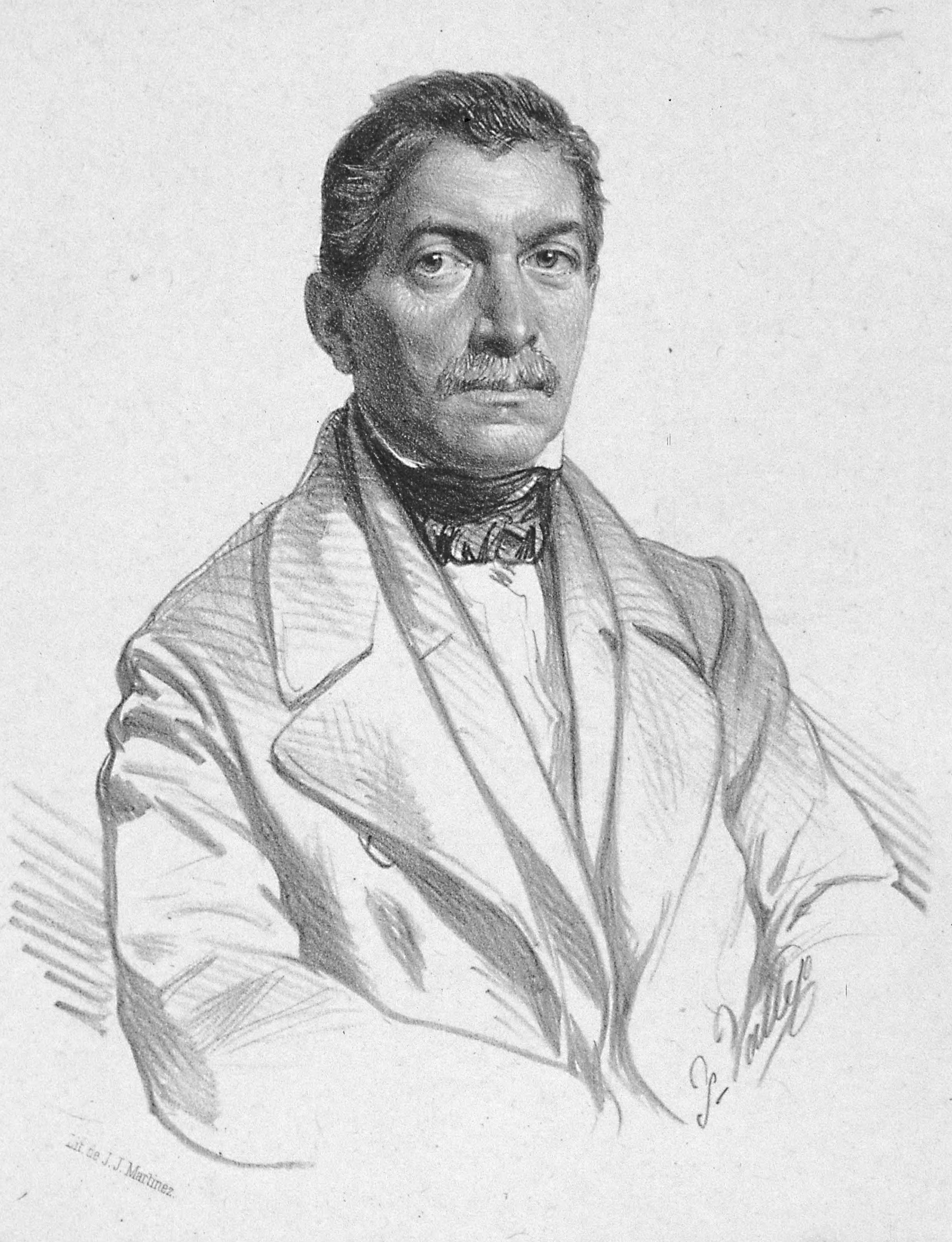
	First party	Second party	Third party
Leader	Agustín Argüelles	Francisco Martínez de la Rosa	Fermín Caballero
Party	Independents	Moderate	Progressive Party
Leader's seat	Asturias	Madrid	Madrid
Seats won	90	70	30
Prime Minister before election
José María Calatrava
Moderate Party
Prime Minister after election
José María Calatrava
Moderate Party

General elections to the Cortes Generales were held in Spain in October 1836. At stake were all 149 seats in the Congress of Deputies, in order to adopt a new constitution to replace the Royal Statute of 1834. The Cortes eventually enacted the Constitution of 1837.

== Electoral system ==
=== Right to vote ===
All male citizens older than 21 had the right to vote.

=== Constituencies ===
A majority voting system was used for the election, with 48 multi-member constituencies and one single-member constituency. Voting was secret and indirect.

== Results ==
Party	Seats
Independents	90
Moderate Party	70
Progressive Party	30
Total	242
