= 5th Virginia Regiment =

- Active: 1775–1779
- Type: Infantry
- Part of: Virginia Line
- Engagements: Battle of Trenton, Battle of Princeton, Battle of Brandywine, Battle of Germantown, Battle of Monmouth

The 5th Virginia Regiment was raised on December 28, 1775, at Richmond, Virginia, for service with the U.S. Continental Army. The regiment saw action at the Battle of Trenton, Battle of Princeton, Battle of Brandywine, Battle of Germantown, Battle of Monmouth and the Siege of Charleston. The regiment was joined to the 3rd Virginia Regiment on May 12, 1779. General William Russell and Col. Josiah Parker were two of its commanders.

Among the negroes serving in the 5th Virginia was James Due. Due was a soldier under the command of Captain John Hawkins of Maryland. James Due was captured at Elizabethtown, NJ and served eleven months as a prisoner of war. He obtained a pension in 1821.

== List of commanders ==
- Colonel William Peach from 13 February 1776 – 7 May 1776
- Colonel Charles Scott from 7 May 1776 – 1 April 1777
- Colonel Josiah Parker from 1 April 1777 – 12 July 1778
- Colonel William Russell from 14 September 1778 – 12 May 1779

== See also ==
3rd Virginia Regiment
