= List of governors of Kentucky =

Governor of Kentucky
- Commonwealth Seal

- Incumbent; Andy Beshear since December 10, 2019 (first term) - re-elected consecutively, December 12, 2023 (second term)
- Style: The Honorable
- Residence: Kentucky Governor's Mansion
- Term length: Four years, renewable again consecutively or nonconsecutively then, available again after 4-year cool-off period
- Inaugural holder: Isaac Shelby
- Formation: Kentucky County, Virginia admitted to the Union as Kentucky on June 1, 1792
- Succession: Line of succession
- Deputy: Lieutenant Governor of Kentucky
- Salary: $174,216 (2026)
- Website: governor.ky.gov

The governor of Kentucky is the head of government of the Commonwealth of Kentucky. Fifty-nine individuals have held the office of governor. Prior to a 1992 amendment to the constitution, governors were prohibited from succeeding themselves in office, though four (Isaac Shelby, John L. Helm, James B. McCreary and Happy Chandler) served multiple non-consecutive terms. Paul E. Patton, the first Kentucky governor eligible for a second consecutive term under the amendment, won his reelection bid in 1999. James Garrard succeeded himself in 1800, before the constitutional provision existed. Garrard is also the longest serving governor, serving for a total period of eight years and 90 days. In 2023 Democrat Andy Beshear became the 3rd incumbent governor in Kentucky history to be reelected to a second consecutive term.

William Goebel, who was elected to the office in the disputed election of 1899, remains the only governor of any U.S. state to die from assassination while in office. Goebel is also the shortest serving governor, serving for a period of only three days. Martha Layne Collins, who held the office from 1983 to 1987, was the first woman to serve as governor and was only the third woman to serve as governor of any U.S. state who had not been married to a previous governor. The 63rd and current Kentucky governor is Democrat Andy Beshear, who took office on December 10, 2019.

== Governors ==
Kentucky County, Virginia was admitted to the Union as Kentucky on June 1, 1792. There have been 59 governors, serving 63 distinct terms.

An unelected group proclaimed Kentucky's secession from the Union on November 20, 1861, and it was annexed by the Confederate States of America on December 10, 1861. The Confederate government elected two governors, but it never held much control over the state.

The original 1792 Constitution of Kentucky had the governor chosen by an electoral college for a term of four years, commencing on the first day of June. The second constitution in 1799 changed this to a popular vote, prevented governors from succeeding themselves within seven years of their terms, and moved the start date to the fourth Tuesday after the election. The third constitution in 1850 reduced the succession limitation to four years, and moved the start date of the term to the fifth Tuesday after the election. A 1992 amendment allowed governors to have a second term before being prevented from succeeding themselves for four years. Originally, should the office of governor be vacant, the speaker of the Senate would exercise the powers of the office; in 1799, the office of lieutenant governor was created to fill this role, and, as of 1992, is elected on the same ticket as the governor.

Governors of the Commonwealth of Kentucky
No. (Note: The state labels Andy Beshear as the 63nd governor; based on this, subsequent terms of repeat governors are numbered.)	Governor	Term in office	Party	Election	Lt. Governor (Note: The office of lieutenant governor was created in 1799.) (Note: Lieutenant governors represented the same party as their governor unless noted.)
1	Isaac Shelby (1750–1826)	June 4, 1792 – June 1, 1796 (1459 days; retired)	Democratic- Republican	1792	Office did not exist
2	James Garrard (1749–1822)	June 1, 1796 – September 5, 1804 (3018 days; term-limited) (Note: Under the 1799 constitution, governors were ineligible for seven years after the end of their term.)	Democratic- Republican	1796	Office did not exist
2	James Garrard (1749–1822)	June 1, 1796 – September 5, 1804 (3018 days; term-limited)	Democratic- Republican	1800	Alexander Scott Bullitt
3	Christopher Greenup (1750–1818)	September 5, 1804 – August 23, 1808 (1449 days; term-limited)	Democratic- Republican	1804	John Caldwell (died November 19, 1804)
3	Christopher Greenup (1750–1818)	September 5, 1804 – August 23, 1808 (1449 days; term-limited)	Democratic- Republican	1804	Vacant
3	Christopher Greenup (1750–1818)	September 5, 1804 – August 23, 1808 (1449 days; term-limited)	Democratic- Republican	1804	Thomas Posey (acting, elected Speaker in 1805)
4	Charles Scott (1739–1813)	August 23, 1808 – August 24, 1812 (1463 days; term-limited)	Democratic- Republican	1808	Gabriel Slaughter
5	Isaac Shelby (1750–1826)	August 24, 1812 – September 5, 1816 (1474 days; term-limited)	Democratic- Republican	1812	Richard Hickman
6	George Madison (1763–1816)	September 5, 1816 (Note: The constitutional start date would have been August 27; however, contemporary news indicates Madison succeeded Shelby on September 5.) – October 14, 1816 (40 days; died in office)	Democratic- Republican	1816	Gabriel Slaughter
7	Gabriel Slaughter (1767–1830)	October 14, 1816 – September 7, 1820 (1425 days; retired)	Democratic- Republican	Succeeded from lieutenant governor	Vacant
8	John Adair (1757–1840)	September 7, 1820 (Note: The constitutional start date would have been August 29; however, what little contemporary reporting that has been found says he was inaugurated on September 7.) – August 24, 1824 (1448 days; term-limited)	Democratic- Republican	1820	William T. Barry
9	Joseph Desha (1768–1842)	August 24, 1824 – August 26, 1828 (1464 days; term-limited)	Democratic- Republican	1824	Robert B. McAfee
10	Thomas Metcalfe (1780–1855)	August 26, 1828 – August 28, 1832 (1464 days; term-limited)	National; Republican (Note: Kallenbach labels Metcalfe both as a Whig and a National Republican; Glashan labels him a National Republican; and Dubin and Sobel & Raimo describe him as a pro-Adams Administration candidate.)	1828	John Breathitt (Note: Represented the Democratic Party)
11	John Breathitt (1786–1834)	August 28, 1832 – February 21, 1834 (543 days; died in office)	Democratic	1832	James T. Morehead (Note: Represented the National Republican Party.)
12	James T. Morehead (1797–1854)	February 21, 1834 – August 30, 1836 (922 days; retired)	National; Republican (Note: Glashan labels Morehead a National Republican, and Sobel & Raimo note he succeeded to governor as a Whig, as the National Republicans had transitioned into the Whig Party in 1834.)	Succeeded from lieutenant governor	Vacant
13	James Clark (1779–1839)	August 30, 1836 – August 27, 1839 (1093 days; died in office)	Whig	1836	Charles A. Wickliffe
14	Charles A. Wickliffe (1788–1869)	August 27, 1839 – September 2, 1840 (373 days; retired)	Whig	Succeeded from lieutenant governor	Vacant
15	Robert P. Letcher (1788–1861)	September 2, 1840 – September 4, 1844 (1464 days; term-limited)	Whig	1840	Manlius Valerius Thomson
16	William Owsley (1782–1862)	September 4, 1844 – September 6, 1848 (1464 days; term-limited)	Whig	1844	Archibald Dixon
17	John J. Crittenden (1787–1863)	September 6, 1848 – July 30, 1850 (693 days; resigned) (Note: Crittenden resigned, having been confirmed as United States Attorney General.)	Whig	1848 (Note: The 1850 constitution shifted the election schedule forward, shortening this term by a year.)	John L. Helm
18	John L. Helm (1802–1867)	July 30, 1850 (Note: Helm was sworn in on July 31, but contemporary sources say Crittenden resigned on July 30.) – September 2, 1851 (400 days; retired)	Whig	Succeeded from lieutenant governor	Vacant
19	Lazarus Powell (1812–1867)	September 2, 1851 – September 4, 1855 (1464 days; term-limited) (Note: Under the 1850 constitution, governors were ineligible for four years after the end of their term.)	Democratic	1851	John Burton Thompson (Note: Represented the Whig Party.)
20	Charles S. Morehead (1802–1868)	September 4, 1855 – August 30, 1859 (1457 days; term-limited)	American	1855	James Greene Hardy
21	Beriah Magoffin (1815–1885)	August 30, 1859 – August 18, 1862 (1085 days; resigned) (Note: Magoffin resigned due to disagreement with the state legislature over neutrality in the American Civil War.)	Democratic	1859	Linn Boyd (died December 17, 1859)
21	Beriah Magoffin (1815–1885)	August 30, 1859 – August 18, 1862 (1085 days; resigned)	Democratic	1859	Vacant
22	James Fisher Robinson (1800–1882)	August 18, 1862 – September 1, 1863 (380 days; retired)	Democratic	Succeeded from president of the Senate	Vacant
23	Thomas E. Bramlette (1817–1875)	September 1, 1863 – September 3, 1867 (1464 days; term-limited)	Union; Democratic	1863	Richard Taylor Jacob
24	John L. Helm (1802–1867)	September 3, 1867 – September 8, 1867 (6 days; died in office)	Democratic	1867	John W. Stevenson
25	John W. Stevenson (1812–1886)	September 8, 1867 – February 13, 1871 (1255 days; resigned) (Note: Stevenson resigned, having been elected to the United States Senate.)	Democratic	Succeeded from lieutenant governor	Vacant
25	John W. Stevenson (1812–1886)	September 8, 1867 – February 13, 1871 (1255 days; resigned)	Democratic	1868 (special)	Vacant
26	Preston Leslie (1819–1907)	February 13, 1871 – August 31, 1875 (1661 days; term-limited)	Democratic	Succeeded from president of the Senate	Vacant
26	Preston Leslie (1819–1907)	February 13, 1871 – August 31, 1875 (1661 days; term-limited)	Democratic	1871	John G. Carlisle
27	James B. McCreary (1838–1918)	August 31, 1875 – September 2, 1879 (1464 days; term-limited)	Democratic	1875	John C. Underwood
28	Luke P. Blackburn (1816–1887)	September 2, 1879 – September 4, 1883 (1464 days; term-limited)	Democratic	1879	James E. Cantrill
29	J. Proctor Knott (1830–1911)	September 4, 1883 – August 30, 1887 (1457 days; term-limited)	Democratic	1883	James R. Hindman
30	Simon Bolivar Buckner (1823–1914)	August 30, 1887 – September 1, 1891 (1464 days; term-limited)	Democratic	1887	James William Bryan
31	John Y. Brown (1835–1904)	September 1, 1891 – December 10, 1895 (1562 days; term-limited)	Democratic	1891	Mitchell Cary Alford
32	William O'Connell Bradley (1847–1914)	December 10, 1895 – December 12, 1899 (1464 days; term-limited)	Republican	1895	William Jackson Worthington
33	William S. Taylor (1853–1928)	December 12, 1899 – January 31, 1900 (51 days; removed) (Note: Taylor won the 1899 election and was sworn into office. However, the legislature challenged the validity of his win, claiming ballot fraud. His challenger, Goebel, was shot on January 30, 1900, but was named governor by the legislature and sworn in the next day; he died three days later. Since Lieutenant Governor Marshall's win had also been invalidated, Beckham, having been named lieutenant governor, succeeded Goebel.)	Republican	1899	John Marshall
34	William Goebel (1856–1900)	January 31, 1900 – February 3, 1900 (4 days; assassinated)	Democratic	1899	J. C. W. Beckham
35	J. C. W. Beckham (1869–1940)	February 3, 1900 – December 10, 1907 (2867 days; term-limited)	Democratic	Succeeded from lieutenant governor	Vacant
35	J. C. W. Beckham (1869–1940)	February 3, 1900 – December 10, 1907 (2867 days; term-limited)	Democratic	1900 (special)	Vacant
35	J. C. W. Beckham (1869–1940)	February 3, 1900 – December 10, 1907 (2867 days; term-limited)	Democratic	1903	William P. Thorne
36	Augustus E. Willson (1846–1931)	December 10, 1907 – December 12, 1911 (1464 days; term-limited)	Republican	1907	William Hopkinson Cox
37	James B. McCreary (1838–1918)	December 12, 1911 – December 7, 1915 (1457 days; term-limited) (Note: McCreary, being term-limited, had already lost the Democratic nomination for the United States Senate when his term ended.)	Democratic	1911	Edward J. McDermott
38	Augustus Owsley Stanley (1867–1958)	December 7, 1915 – May 19, 1919 (1260 days; resigned) (Note: Stanley resigned, having been elected to the United States Senate.)	Democratic	1915	James D. Black
39	James D. Black (1849–1938)	May 19, 1919 – December 9, 1919 (205 days; lost election)	Democratic	Succeeded from lieutenant governor	Vacant
40	Edwin P. Morrow (1877–1935)	December 9, 1919 – December 11, 1923 (1464 days; term-limited)	Republican	1919	S. Thruston Ballard
41	William J. Fields (1874–1954)	December 11, 1923 – December 13, 1927 (1464 days; term-limited)	Democratic	1923	Henry Denhardt
42	Flem D. Sampson (1875–1967)	December 13, 1927 – December 8, 1931 (1457 days; term-limited)	Republican	1927	James Breathitt Jr.
43	Ruby Laffoon (1869–1941)	December 8, 1931 – December 10, 1935 (1464 days; term-limited)	Democratic	1931	Happy Chandler
44	Happy Chandler (1898–1991)	December 10, 1935 – October 9, 1939 (1400 days; resigned) (Note: Chandler resigned so that his successor would appoint him to the United States Senate.)	Democratic	1935	Keen Johnson
45	Keen Johnson (1896–1970)	October 9, 1939 – December 7, 1943 (1521 days; term-limited)	Democratic	Succeeded from lieutenant governor	Vacant
45	Keen Johnson (1896–1970)	October 9, 1939 – December 7, 1943 (1521 days; term-limited)	Democratic	1939	Rodes K. Myers
46	Simeon Willis (1879–1965)	December 7, 1943 – December 9, 1947 (1464 days; term-limited)	Republican	1943	Kenneth H. Tuggle
47	Earle Clements (1896–1985)	December 9, 1947 – November 27, 1950 (1085 days; resigned) (Note: Clements resigned, having been elected to the United States Senate.)	Democratic	1947	Lawrence Wetherby
48	Lawrence Wetherby (1908–1994)	November 27, 1950 – December 13, 1955 (1843 days; term-limited)	Democratic	Succeeded from lieutenant governor	Vacant
48	Lawrence Wetherby (1908–1994)	November 27, 1950 – December 13, 1955 (1843 days; term-limited)	Democratic	1951	Emerson Beauchamp
49	Happy Chandler (1898–1991)	December 13, 1955 – December 8, 1959 (1457 days; term-limited)	Democratic	1955	Harry Lee Waterfield
50	Bert Combs (1911–1991)	December 8, 1959 – December 10, 1963 (1464 days; term-limited)	Democratic	1959	Wilson W. Wyatt
51	Ned Breathitt (1924–2003)	December 10, 1963 – December 12, 1967 (1464 days; term-limited)	Democratic	1963	Harry Lee Waterfield
52	Louie Nunn (1924–2004)	December 12, 1967 – December 7, 1971 (1457 days; term-limited)	Republican	1967	Wendell Ford
53	Wendell Ford (1924–2015)	December 7, 1971 – December 28, 1974 (1118 days; resigned) (Note: Ford resigned, having been elected to the United States Senate.)	Democratic	1971	Julian Carroll
54	Julian Carroll (1931–2023)	December 28, 1974 – December 11, 1979 (1810 days; term-limited)	Democratic	Succeeded from lieutenant governor	Vacant
54	Julian Carroll (1931–2023)	December 28, 1974 – December 11, 1979 (1810 days; term-limited)	Democratic	1975	Thelma Stovall
55	John Y. Brown Jr. (1933–2022)	December 11, 1979 – December 13, 1983 (1464 days; term-limited)	Democratic	1979	Martha Layne Collins
56	Martha Layne Collins (1936–2025)	December 13, 1983 – December 8, 1987 (1457 days; term-limited)	Democratic	1983	Steve Beshear
57	Wallace Wilkinson (1941–2002)	December 8, 1987 – December 10, 1991 (1464 days; term-limited)	Democratic	1987	Brereton C. Jones
58	Brereton C. Jones (1939–2023)	December 10, 1991 – December 12, 1995 (1464 days; term-limited) (Note: Under a 1992 amendment to the constitution, governors are ineligible for four years after the end of their second consecutive elected term.)	Democratic	1991	Paul E. Patton
59	Paul E. Patton (b. 1937)	December 12, 1995 – December 9, 2003 (2920 days; term-limited)	Democratic	1995	Steve Henry
59	Paul E. Patton (b. 1937)	December 12, 1995 – December 9, 2003 (2920 days; term-limited)	Democratic	1999	Steve Henry
60	Ernie Fletcher (b. 1952)	December 9, 2003 – December 11, 2007 (1464 days; lost election)	Republican	2003	Steve Pence
61	Steve Beshear (b. 1944)	December 11, 2007 – December 8, 2015 (2920 days; term-limited)	Democratic	2007	Daniel Mongiardo
61	Steve Beshear (b. 1944)	December 11, 2007 – December 8, 2015 (2920 days; term-limited)	Democratic	2011	Jerry Abramson (resigned November 13, 2014)
61	Steve Beshear (b. 1944)	December 11, 2007 – December 8, 2015 (2920 days; term-limited)	Democratic	2011	Crit Luallen
62	Matt Bevin (b. 1967)	December 8, 2015 – December 10, 2019 (1464 days; lost election)	Republican	2015	Jenean Hampton
63	Andy Beshear (b. 1977)	December 10, 2019 – Incumbent (Note: Beshear's second term began on December 12, 2023, and will expire on December 7, 2027; he will be term-limited.) (in office 2540 days)	Democratic	2019	Jacqueline Coleman
63	Andy Beshear (b. 1977)	December 10, 2019 – Incumbent (in office 2540 days)	Democratic	2023	Jacqueline Coleman

== Confederate governors ==
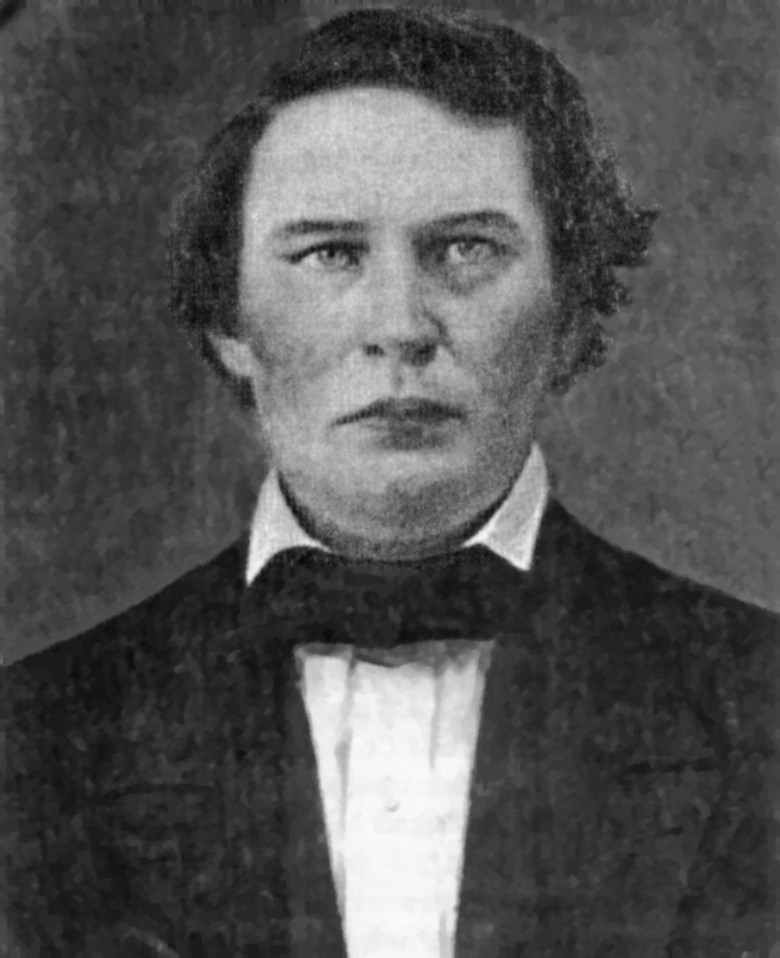
George W. Johnson, 1st Confederate Governor of Kentucky

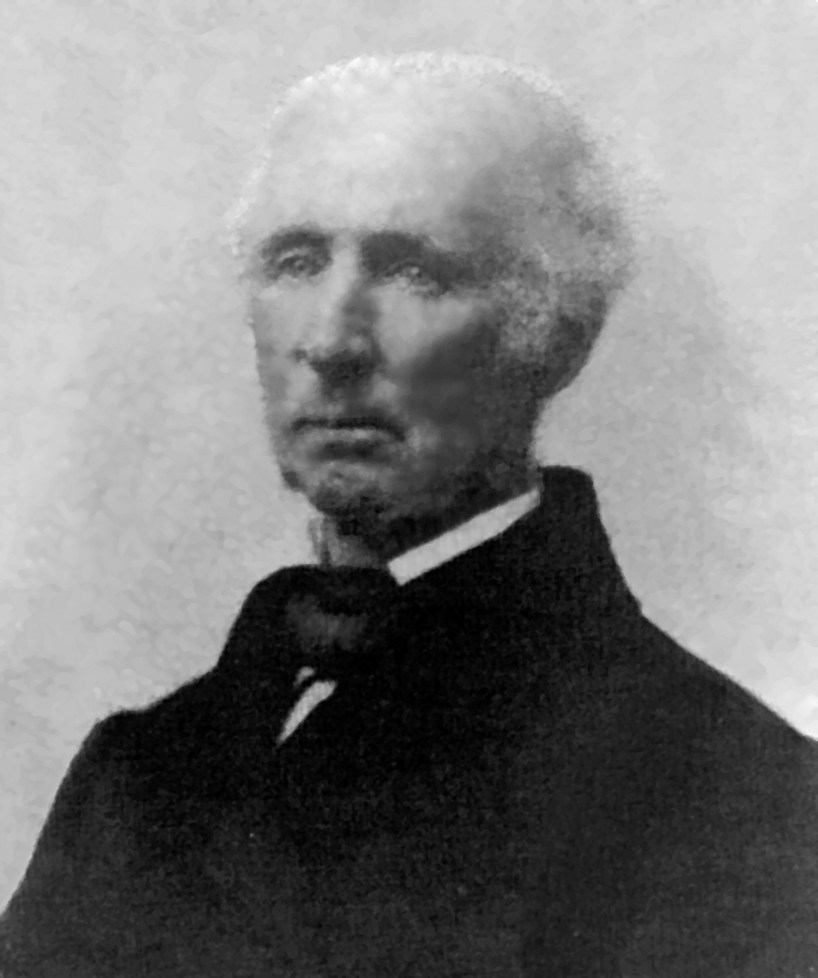
Richard Hawes, 2nd Confederate Governor of Kentucky

During the Civil War, a group of secessionists met at Russellville to form a Confederate government for the Commonwealth of Kentucky. This government never successfully displaced the government in Frankfort, and Kentucky remained in the Union through the entire war. Two men were elected governor of the Confederate government: George W. Johnson, who served from November 20, 1861, to his death on April 8, 1862, at the Battle of Shiloh, and, on Johnson's death, Richard Hawes, who served until the Confederate surrender on April 9, 1865. The Confederate government disbanded shortly after the end of the war in 1865.

== See also ==
- Gubernatorial lines of succession in the United States § Kentucky
- First ladies and gentlemen of Kentucky
- Lieutenant Governor of Kentucky
- List of Kentucky General Assemblies

== Sources ==
- "Former Kentucky Governors". National Governors Association.
- "Kentucky's Governors". Kentucky Department for Libraries and Archives. Archived from the original on July 8, 2010.
- "Kentucky Constitution". State Democracy Research Initiative. University of Wisconsin Law School.
- Dubin, Michael J. (2003). United States Gubernatorial Elections, 1776–1860: The Official Results by State and County. McFarland. ISBN 0-7864-1439-1 – via Internet Archive.
- Glashan, Roy R. (1979). American Governors and Gubernatorial Elections, 1775-1978. Meckler Books. ISBN 0-7201-1511-6 – via Internet Archive.
- Kallenbach, Joseph E.; Kallenbach, Jessamine S. (1977). American State Governors, 1776-1976. Oceana Publications. ISBN 978-0-379-00665-0 – via Internet Archive.
- Mullaney, Marie Marmo (1994). Biographical Directory of the Governors of the United States, 1988–1994. Greenwood Publishing Group. ISBN 0-313-28312-5 – via Internet Archive.
- Sobel, Robert; Raimo, John (1978). Biographical Directory of the Governors of the United States, 1789-1978. Vol. 2. Meckler Books. ISBN 0-930466-01-2 – via Internet Archive.
- Thorpe, Francis Newton, ed. (1909). The Federal and State Constitutions, Colonial Charters, and Other Organic Laws of the States, Territories, and Colonies Now or Heretofore Forming the United States of America. Vol. 3. United States Government Publishing Office – via Internet Archive.
