= First governorship of Isaac Shelby =

First term of Kentucky governor Isaac Shelby, 1792–1796

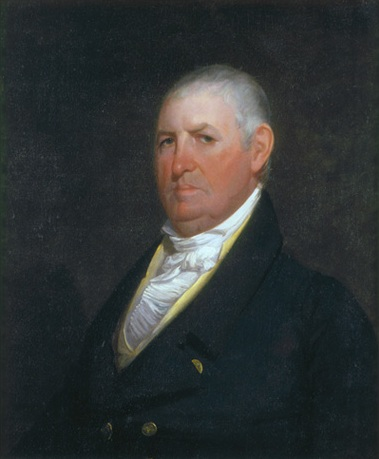
- c. 1820 portrait of Shelby
- First governorship of Isaac Shelby; June 4, 1792 – June 1, 1796
- Governor: Isaac Shelby
- Cabinet: See administration
- Party: Democratic-Republican
- Election: 1792
- Seat: Lexington (1792); Frankfort (1793–1796)
- Seal of Kentucky

The first governorship of Isaac Shelby began on June 4, 1792, when Isaac Shelby was inaugurated as the first governor of Kentucky, and ended on June 1, 1796. Kentucky had entered the Union as the fifteenth state on June 1, three days before Shelby took office. Chosen unanimously by the state's electors, Shelby led the creation of Kentucky's executive administration and the implementation of its first constitution.

The new state government established a tax system, courts, administrative offices, and a militia organization. It also selected Frankfort as the permanent capital and created four new counties. Frontier defense remained a central concern, and Kentucky mounted volunteers served under Anthony Wayne in the campaign that culminated in the Battle of Fallen Timbers in 1794. A major political dispute arose from the efforts of French agents associated with Edmond-Charles Genêt to organize an expedition from Kentucky against Spanish Louisiana. Shelby questioned whether he had authority to arrest participants before they committed an overt illegal act but pledged to perform whatever actions the United States government constitutionally required of him. The expedition did not depart.

Kentuckians' demand for access to the Mississippi River also dominated the term. Spain granted Americans navigation rights and a right of deposit at New Orleans in the 1795 Pinckney's Treaty. In the final year of Shelby's governorship, the Kentucky legislature authorized improvements that made the Wilderness Road passable for wagons. Shelby did not seek an immediate second term and was succeeded by James Garrard.

== Background and election ==
Before statehood, Kentucky formed the western counties of Virginia. Distance from Virginia's government, conflict with Indigenous nations north of the Ohio River, uncertainty over land titles, and the need for access to the Mississippi encouraged a movement for separation. Shelby participated in several of the conventions that considered Kentucky statehood and was a delegate to the 1792 convention that drafted the state's first constitution.

The 1792 constitution did not provide for direct popular election of the governor. Voters instead chose electors, who selected the governor and members of the Kentucky Senate. Shelby, a veteran of the American Revolutionary War and a prominent advocate of statehood, was unanimously selected governor in May 1792. He was inaugurated at Lexington on June 4. The ceremony was accompanied by fifteen artillery rounds, representing Kentucky's place as the fifteenth state.

== Administration ==
Kentucky's first constitution made the governor the head of the executive branch and commander in chief of the state militia. The governor could appoint the secretary of state with the advice and consent of the Senate and could fill several other offices created by the constitution or by statute. On June 5, 1792, Shelby appointed James Brown as Kentucky's first secretary of state with the Senate's consent. The General Assembly selected John Logan as the first state treasurer. George Nicholas became the first attorney general; William Murray and John Breckinridge subsequently held that office during Shelby's term.

Shelby's administration operated without a lieutenant governor because the office did not exist under the 1792 constitution. Although national political parties were still developing, Shelby was associated with the Democratic-Republicans. He generally favored western interests and state authority while recognizing Kentucky's obligations within the federal union.

== Establishment of state government ==
Kentucky's first General Assembly convened in Lexington in a two-story log building. Shelby addressed the legislature on June 6, 1792, two days after his inauguration. The first session lasted 23 working days and enacted the laws needed to put the constitution into operation.

The assembly created a revenue system based on taxes on land, enslaved people, and livestock. It also imposed annual license fees on taverns and retail stores and taxes on billiard tables and stamped legal papers. Taxes were payable in specie, a requirement intended to provide the new government with dependable revenue but difficult for residents of a frontier economy in which hard currency was limited. The government also organized courts and enacted laws governing local administration and public officials.

Kentucky contained nine counties when it became a state. During 1792 the legislature created Logan, Washington, Scott, and Shelby counties, bringing the total to thirteen. The 1792 constitution also protected slavery. Its ninth article restricted the legislature's power to emancipate enslaved people without their owners' consent and compensation and prevented the legislature from barring immigrants from bringing enslaved people into the state.

=== Selection of Frankfort as capital ===
The constitution directed commissioners to select a permanent seat of government. Lexington, Louisville, Leestown, Petersburg, and Frankfort competed for the designation. On December 5, 1792, the commissioners chose Frankfort after the town offered land, building materials, money, and other assistance. The state contracted with Frankfort for construction of a capitol, which was completed in 1794.

== Frontier defense ==
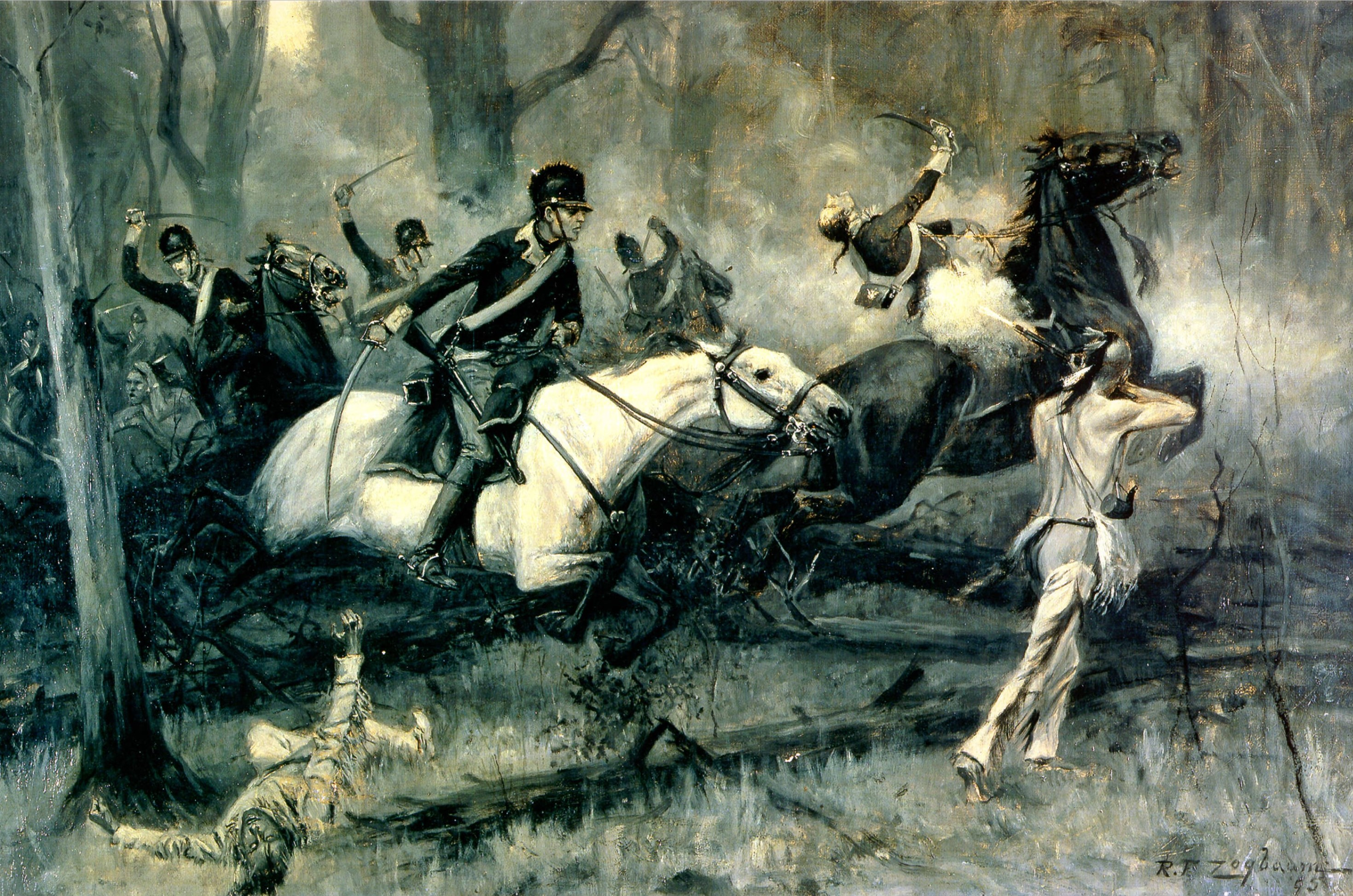
Charge of the Dragoons at Fallen Timbers, an 1895 depiction of the Battle of Fallen Timbers

=== Militia organization ===
Violence along Kentucky's northern frontier continued after statehood. Settlers had participated in repeated campaigns across the Ohio River, while Indigenous nations resisted American settlement in the region. The federal government directed policy and military operations in the Northwest Indian War, limiting Kentucky's ability to undertake independent offensive expeditions. Shelby therefore pressed federal officials for adequate protection while organizing the resources available to the state.

Under the 1792 constitution, the governor commanded Kentucky's militia except when it was called into federal service. State law made most white men between the ages of 18 and 45 liable for militia duty and organized them into divisions, brigades, regiments, battalions, and companies. The system provided a command structure for local defense and for supplying troops requested by the United States.

=== Wayne's campaign ===
On September 26, 1793, Major General Anthony Wayne requested 1,500 mounted Kentucky volunteers for his campaign in the Northwest Territory. The Kentuckians served under Major General Charles Scott, acting as scouts, outriders, and mounted support for Wayne's Legion of the United States. They took part in the campaign that ended in Wayne's victory at Fallen Timbers on August 20, 1794.

The victory broke the military power of the Indigenous confederacy opposing the United States. The subsequent Treaty of Greenville in 1795 ended the Northwest Indian War and reduced the immediate danger to Kentucky's northern settlements. Shelby's role was principally to organize and provide the requested state forces; Wayne retained command of the federal campaign.

== Mississippi navigation ==
Kentucky farmers depended on western rivers to move flour, tobacco, hemp, livestock, and other products to distant markets. The Appalachian Mountains made eastern overland trade expensive, so access through the Mississippi River and the Spanish-held port of New Orleans was a major political issue. Spain's restrictions on navigation and trade produced resentment and encouraged proposals for direct western action.

=== Citizen Genêt affair ===
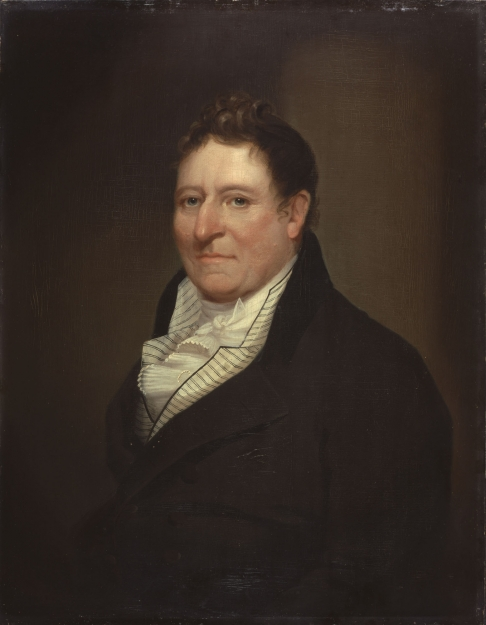
French minister Edmond-Charles Genêt supported plans for an expedition from Kentucky against Spanish Louisiana.

In 1793, France's minister to the United States, Edmond-Charles Genêt, encouraged Americans to support France in its wars against Britain and Spain. French agents, including botanist André Michaux, entered Kentucky seeking men and supplies for an expedition down the Mississippi against Spanish Louisiana. George Rogers Clark accepted a French commission and proposed to lead the force.

Secretary of State Thomas Jefferson warned Shelby about the plan in August 1793 and asked him to prevent violations of American neutrality. Shelby assured federal officials that Kentucky would meet its obligations, but he was reluctant to act against residents before they committed an overt illegal act. After receiving further reports from French agent Charles Delpeau, Shelby asked federal officials to identify the law and authority under which arrests could be made.

In a January 13, 1794, response to Jefferson's successor Edmund Randolph, Shelby questioned whether he had constitutional authority to arrest individuals solely because they intended to join the proposed expedition. He nevertheless stated that he would perform whatever the president constitutionally required. Shelby did not arrest Clark or the French agents. He later reported that the expedition appeared unlikely to proceed and that the militia could suppress it if necessary.

The crisis ended during 1794. The French government recalled Genêt, funds and supplies failed to materialize, and his agents abandoned the project. Congress enacted the Neutrality Act of 1794, which more clearly prohibited military expeditions launched from the United States against nations with which the country was at peace. Shelby's conduct reflected both the intensity of Kentucky's demand for Mississippi access and the unsettled division of state and federal power in the early republic.

=== Pinckney's Treaty ===
American diplomacy with Spain continued after the Genêt affair. On October 27, 1795, the United States and Spain signed the Treaty of San Lorenzo, commonly called Pinckney's Treaty. Spain recognized the United States' right to navigate the Mississippi and granted Americans a three-year right of deposit at New Orleans, permitting goods to be unloaded and stored there without paying customs duties.

The treaty addressed one of Kentucky's principal economic grievances. Its negotiation belonged to the Washington administration rather than Shelby's state government, although pressure from Kentucky and other western communities formed part of the political setting in which the agreement was reached. The United States ratified the treaty in March 1796; it was proclaimed in August, after Shelby had left office.

== Internal improvements ==
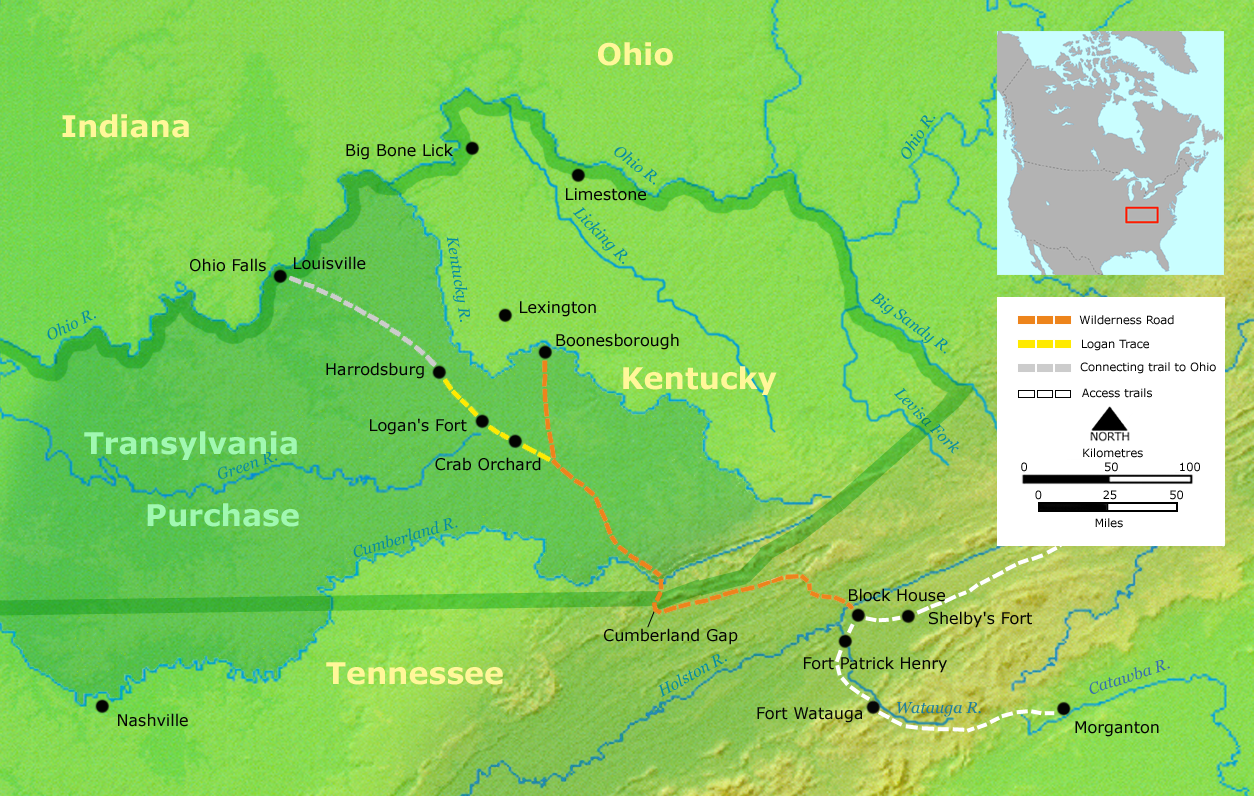
Route of the Wilderness Road into Kentucky

Road improvement was important to immigration, communication, and trade with the eastern states. The Wilderness Road, the principal overland route through the Cumberland Gap, had begun as a trail suitable chiefly for travelers and pack animals. In 1796 the General Assembly authorized improvements that made the route passable for wagons. The work did not transform it into a modern road, but widening and clearing the route made the movement of families and goods into Kentucky easier.

== End of governorship ==
Shelby did not seek another term in 1796. The electoral contest was won by James Garrard, who became Kentucky's second governor. Shelby retired to Traveler's Rest, his estate in Lincoln County, and largely withdrew from state politics for the next fifteen years.

Shelby's first term left Kentucky with functioning executive offices, a revenue structure, courts, a permanent capital, and an organized militia. It also established patterns that continued to shape state politics: concern for frontier security, insistence on access to the Mississippi, and disputes over the limits of federal and state authority. Shelby returned to the governorship in 1812 and served a second, nonconsecutive term during the War of 1812.

== See also ==
- Isaac Shelby
- Second governorship of Isaac Shelby
- History of Kentucky
- List of governors of Kentucky
