= 3rd Kentucky Infantry Regiment =

3rd Kentucky Infantry Regiment may refer to:

- 3rd Kentucky Infantry Regiment (Confederate), a regiment in the Confederate States Army
- 3rd Kentucky Infantry Regiment (Union), a regiment in the Union Army
- 7th Kentucky Infantry Regiment (Union), originally the 3rd Kentucky
