= 1840 Kentucky gubernatorial election =

- August 3, 1840
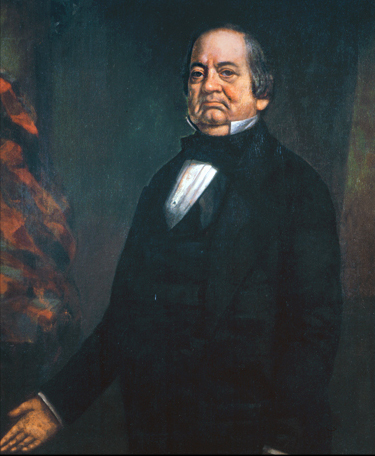

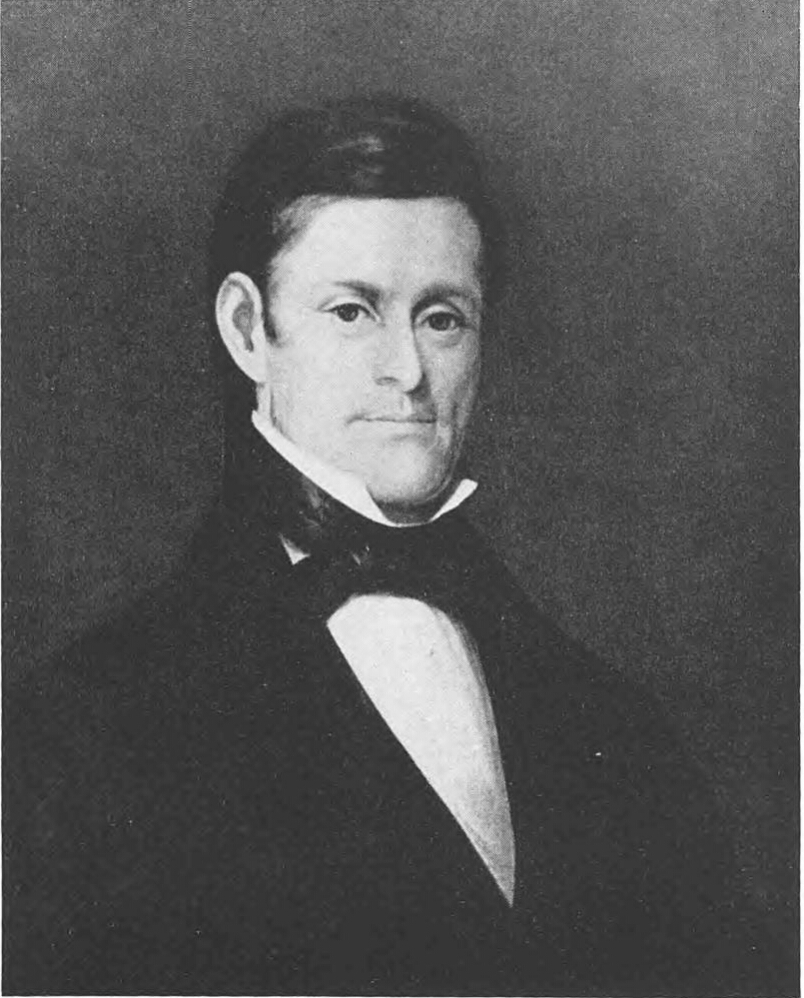
Nominee	Robert P. Letcher	Richard French
Party	Whig	Democratic
Popular vote	55,370	39,659
Percentage	58.27%	41.73%
- Letcher: 50–60% 60–70% 70–80% 80–90% 90–100% French: 50–60% 60–70% 70–80% 80–90%
Governor before election
Charles A. Wickliffe (Acting)
Whig
Elected Governor
Robert P. Letcher
Whig

The 1840 Kentucky gubernatorial election was held on August 3, 1840, in order to elect the Governor of Kentucky. Whig nominee and former member of the U.S. House of Representatives from Kentucky's 5th district Robert P. Letcher defeated Democratic nominee and former member of the U.S. House of Representatives from Kentucky's 11th district Richard French.

== General election ==
On election day, August 3, 1840, Whig nominee Robert P. Letcher won the election by a margin of 15,711 votes against his opponent Democratic nominee Richard French, thereby retaining Whig control over the office of governor. Letcher was sworn in as the 15th governor of Kentucky on August 25, 1840.

=== Results ===
Kentucky gubernatorial election, 1840
Party	Candidate	Votes	%
Whig	Robert P. Letcher	55,370	58.27
Democratic	Richard French	39,659	41.73
Total votes		95,029	100.00
Whig hold			
