= 1844 Kentucky gubernatorial election =

- August 5, 1844
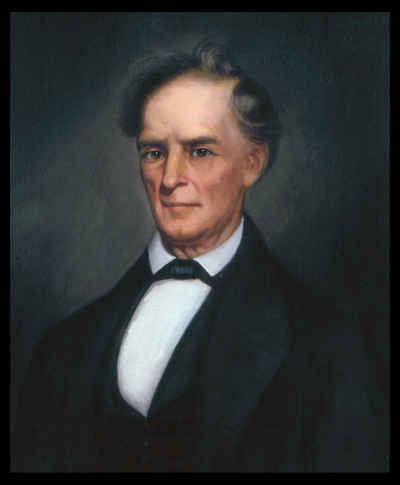

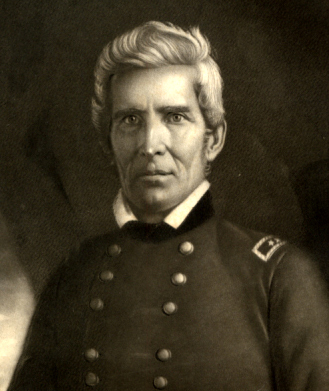
Nominee	William Owsley	William O. Butler
Party	Whig	Democratic
Popular vote	59,680	55,056
Percentage	52.02%	47.98%
- Owsley: 50–60% 60–70% 70–80% 80–90% Butler: 50–60% 60–70% 70–80% 80–90%
Governor before election
Robert P. Letcher
Whig
Elected Governor
William Owsley
Whig

The 1844 Kentucky gubernatorial election was held on August 5, 1844, in order to elect the Governor of Kentucky. Whig nominee and former Secretary of State of Kentucky William Owsley defeated Democratic nominee and former member of the U.S. House of Representatives from Kentucky's 13th district William O. Butler.

== General election ==
On election day, August 5, 1844, Whig nominee William Owsley won the election by a margin of 4,624 votes against his opponent Democratic nominee William O. Butler, thereby retaining Whig control over the office of governor. Owsley was sworn in as the 16th governor of Kentucky on August 27, 1844.

=== Results ===
Kentucky gubernatorial election, 1844
Party	Candidate	Votes	%
Whig	William Owsley	59,680	52.02
Democratic	William O. Butler	55,056	47.98
Total votes		114,736	100.00
Whig hold			
