= 1812 Kentucky gubernatorial election =

- August 3, 1812
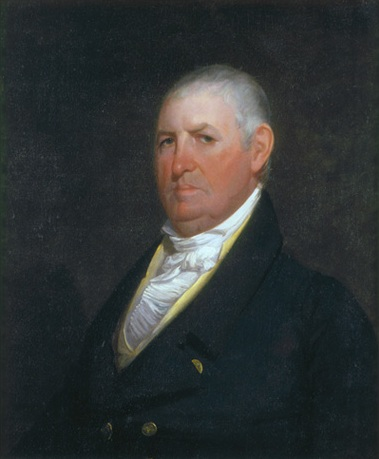

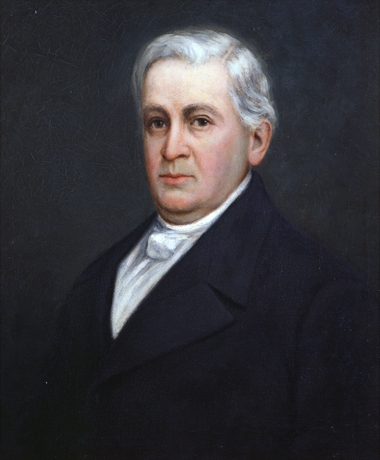
Nominee	Isaac Shelby	Gabriel Slaughter
Party	Democratic-Republican	Democratic-Republican
Popular vote	30,490	12,566
Percentage	70.81%	29.19%
- Shelby: 50–60% 60–70% 70–80% 80–90% >90% Slaughter: 50–60% 60–70% 70–80%
Governor before election
Charles Scott
Democratic-Republican
Elected Governor
Isaac Shelby
Democratic-Republican

The 1812 Kentucky gubernatorial election was held on August 3, 1812, in order to elect the governor of Kentucky. Former Democratic-Republican governor Isaac Shelby defeated fellow Democratic-Republican candidate and incumbent Lieutenant Governor Gabriel Slaughter.

== General election ==
On election day, August 3, 1812, former Democratic-Republican governor Isaac Shelby won the election by a margin of nearly 18,000 votes against his opponent, fellow Democratic-Republican candidate and incumbent lieutenant governor Gabriel Slaughter, thereby retaining Democratic-Republican control over the office of governor. Shelby was sworn in as the 5th governor of Kentucky on August 25, 1812.

=== Results ===
Kentucky gubernatorial election, 1812
Party	Candidate	Votes	%
Democratic-Republican	Isaac Shelby	30,490	70.81
Democratic-Republican	Gabriel Slaughter	12,566	29.19
Total votes		43,056	100.00
Democratic-Republican hold			
