= 1863 Kentucky gubernatorial election =

- August 3, 1863
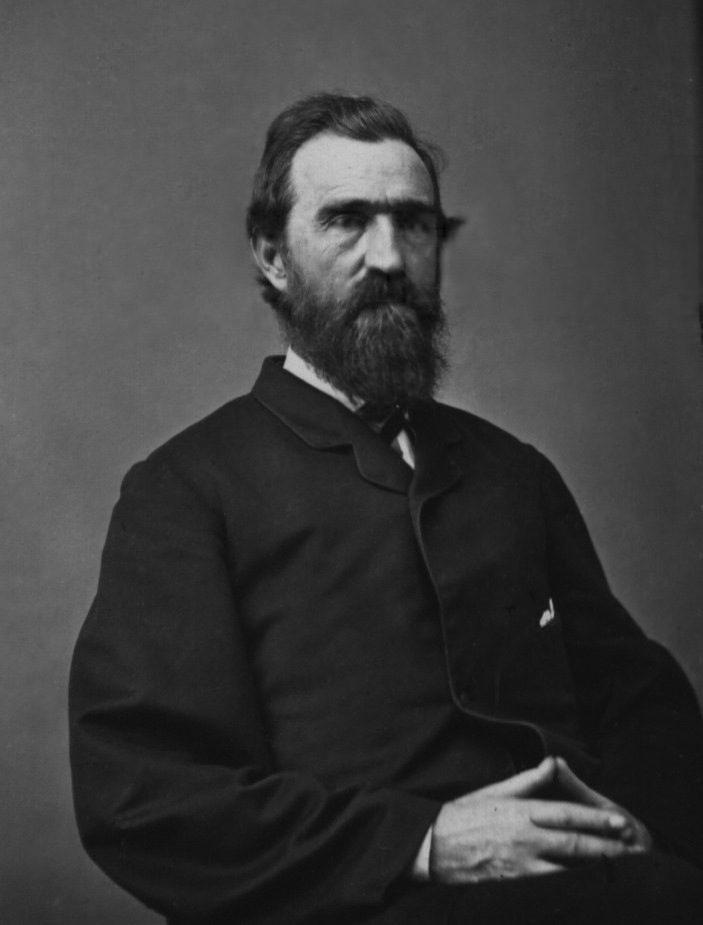

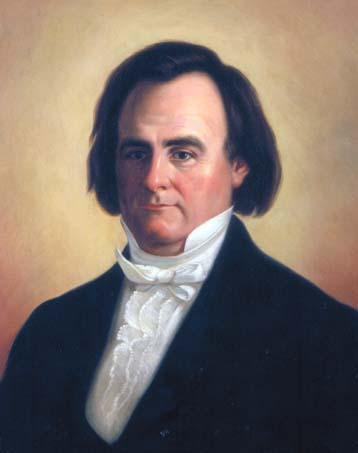
Nominee	Thomas E. Bramlette	Charles A. Wickliffe
Party	Union Democratic	Peace Democratic
Popular vote	67,577	17,458
Percentage	79.47%	20.53%
- County results Bramlette: 50–60% 60–70% 70–80% 80–90% >90% Wickliffe: 50–60% 60–70% 70–80% 80–90%
Governor before election
James Fisher Robinson
Union Democratic
Elected Governor
Thomas E. Bramlette
Union Democratic

The 1863 Kentucky gubernatorial election took place on August 3, 1863, in order to elect the governor of Kentucky. Union Democratic candidate Thomas Elliot Bramlette won his first term as governor against Peace Democratic candidate Charles A. Wickliffe.

According to the Kentucky Historical Society, the election had considerable Union military interference, since some supporters of Wickliffe were imprisoned for allegedly harboring Confederate sympathies.

== Candidates ==
=== Union Democratic Party ===
- Thomas E. Bramlette, who served as U.S. Attorney for the District of Kentucky; colonel and commander of the 3rd Kentucky Infantry; judge of Kentucky's Sixth Judicial District from 1856 to 1862; and commonwealth attorney of Kentucky from 1849 to 1851.

The Union Democratic Party originally nominated Joshua F. Bell, who withdrew after the party convention.

=== Peace Democratic Party ===
- Charles A. Wickliffe, who served as a member of United States House of Representatives for Kentucky from 1823 to 1833 and from 1860 to 1863; United States Postmaster General from 1841 to 1845 in the Tyler administration; and former lieutenant governor of Kentucky from 1836 to 1839 under James Clark and governor of Kentucky after Clark's death in office, until 1840.

== Election ==
=== Statewide ===
1863 Kentucky gubernatorial election
Party	Candidate	Votes	%
Union Democratic	Thomas E. Bramlette	67,577	79.5
Peace Democratic	Charles A. Wickliffe	17,458	20.5
Total votes		85,035	100.00
Union Democratic hold			
