= 1848 Kentucky gubernatorial election =

- August 7, 1848
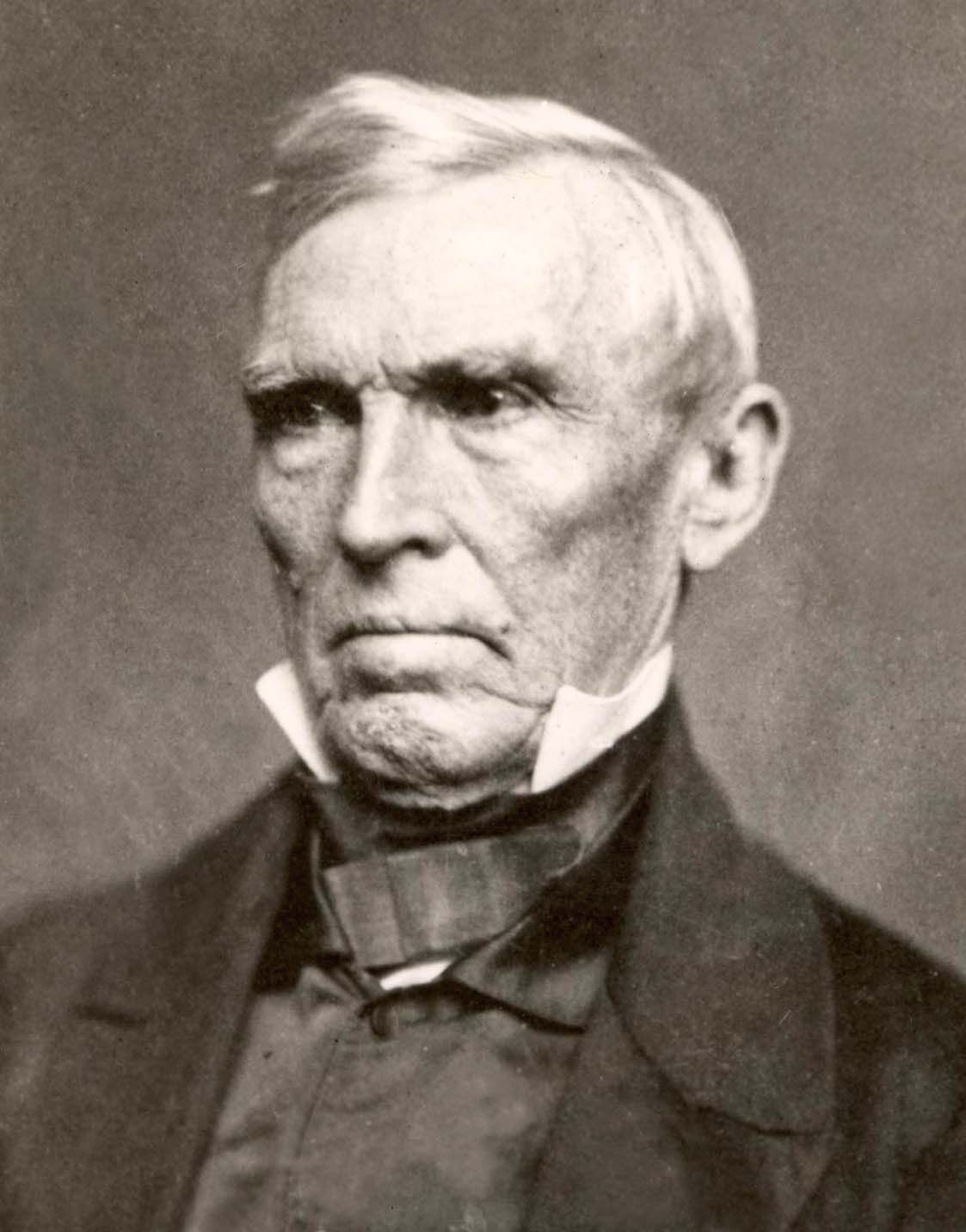

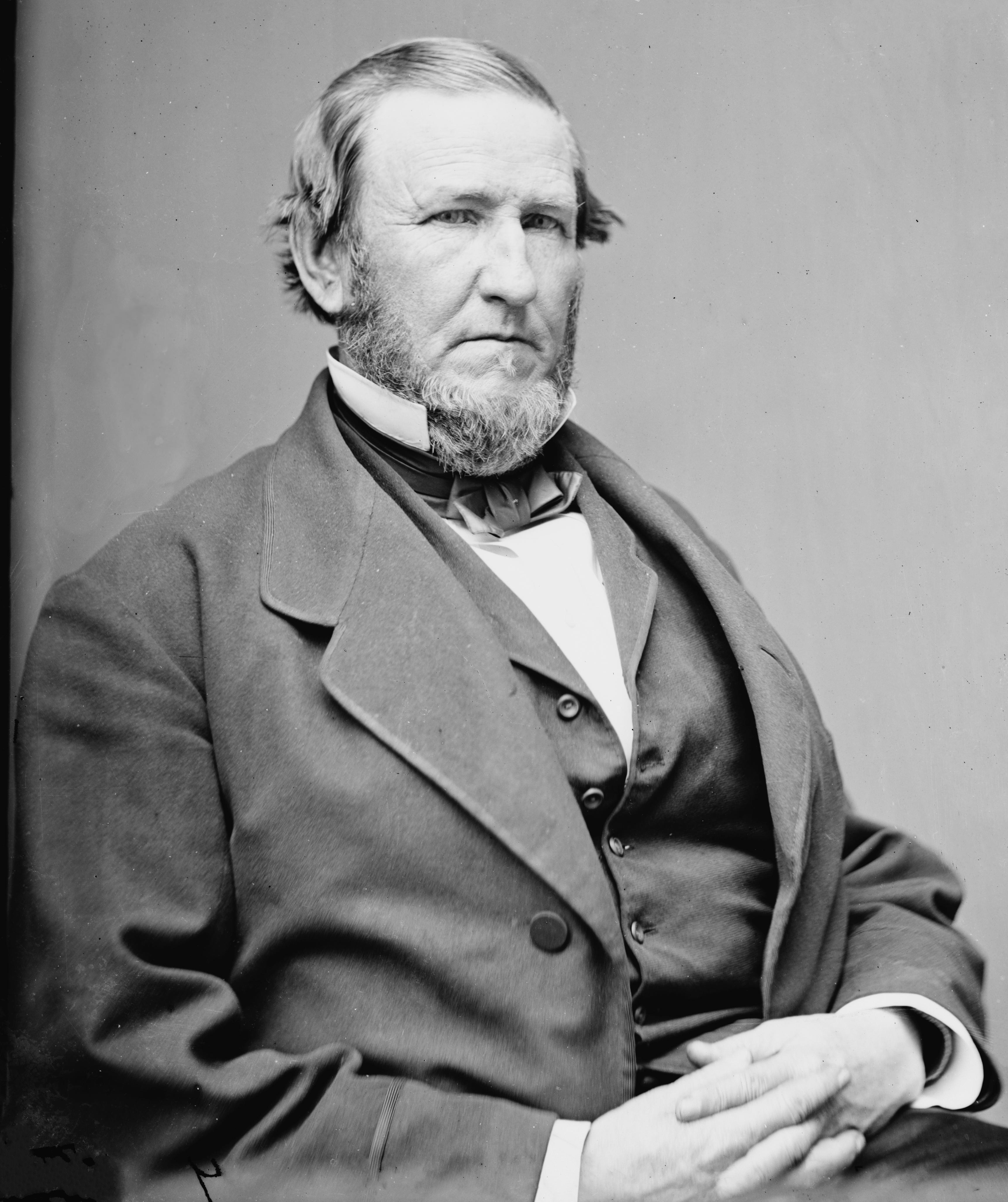
Nominee	John J. Crittenden	Lazarus W. Powell
Party	Whig	Democratic
Popular vote	66,466	58,045
Percentage	53.38%	46.62%
- County results Crittenden: 50–60% 60–70% 70–80% 80–90% Powell: 50–60% 60–70% 70–80% 80–90% No Data/Vote
Governor before election
William Owsley
Whig
Elected Governor
John J. Crittenden
Whig

The 1848 Kentucky gubernatorial election was held on August 7, 1848, in order to elect the Governor of Kentucky. Whig nominee and former United States Senator from Kentucky John J. Crittenden defeated Democratic nominee and former member of the Kentucky House of Representatives Lazarus W. Powell.

== General election ==
On election day, August 7, 1848, Whig nominee John J. Crittenden won the election by a margin of 8,421 votes against his opponent Democratic nominee Lazarus W. Powell, thereby retaining Whig control over the office of governor. Crittenden was sworn in as the 17th governor of Kentucky on August 29, 1848.

=== Results ===
Kentucky gubernatorial election, 1848
Party	Candidate	Votes	%
Whig	John J. Crittenden	66,466	53.38
Democratic	Lazarus W. Powell	58,045	46.62
Total votes		124,511	100.00
Whig hold			
