= 1816 Kentucky gubernatorial election =

- August 5, 1816
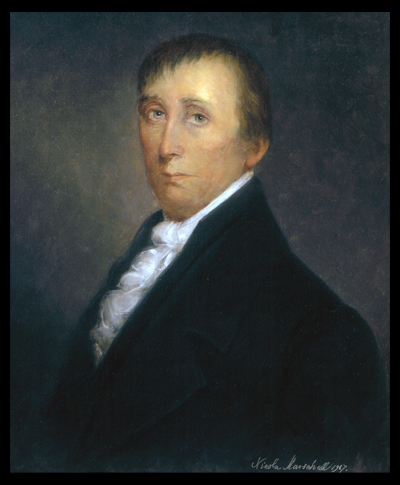
Nominee	George Madison
Party	Democratic-Republican
Popular vote	47,442
Percentage	100.00%
Governor before election
Isaac Shelby
Democratic-Republican
Elected Governor
George Madison
Democratic-Republican

The 1816 Kentucky gubernatorial election was held on August 5, 1816.

Incumbent Democratic-Republican Governor Isaac Shelby was term-limited, and could not seek a second consecutive term.

Former state auditor of public accounts George Madison was elected unopposed.

Madison died on October 14, 1816, six weeks after taking office, and was succeeded by Lieutenant Governor Gabriel Slaughter.

== General election ==
=== Candidates ===
- George Madison, former state auditor of public accounts

==== Withdrawn ====
- James Johnson, former member of the state senate

=== Results ===
1816 Kentucky gubernatorial election
Party	Candidate	Votes	%	±%
Democratic-Republican	George Madison	47,442	100.00%	
Turnout		47,442		
Democratic-Republican hold		Swing		
