= 1792 Kentucky gubernatorial election =

Indirect election of Kentucky's first governor

- May 17, 1792
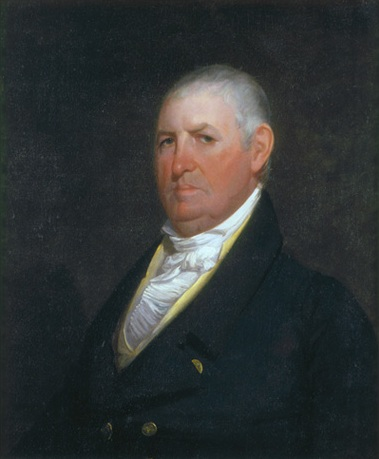
Nominee	Isaac Shelby
Party	Nonpartisan
Electoral vote	Unanimous
Governor before election
Office established
Elected Governor
Isaac Shelby

The 1792 Kentucky gubernatorial election was an indirect election held on May 17, 1792, to choose the first governor of Kentucky. Electors chosen under Kentucky's newly adopted constitution unanimously selected Isaac Shelby. The election preceded Kentucky's admission to the Union as the fifteenth state on June 1, 1792. Shelby was inaugurated in Lexington on June 4.

== Background and electoral system ==
Congress approved Kentucky's separation from Virginia on February 4, 1791, and fixed June 1, 1792, as the date of admission. Delegates met at Danville from April 2 through April 19, 1792, to draft the state's first constitution; Shelby was a delegate to the convention.

The 1792 constitution did not provide for direct election of the governor. On the first Tuesday in May, qualified voters in each county elected as many electors as the county was entitled to representatives in the Kentucky House of Representatives. Those electors were instructed to assemble on the third Tuesday in May to choose the members of the Kentucky Senate and the governor by ballot. The governor was to serve a four-year term beginning on June 1 following the election. The constitution limited the electorate to free male citizens aged 21 or older who met its state or county residency requirement.

== Election ==
Shelby was a veteran of the American Revolutionary War and had participated in several conventions concerning Kentucky's separation from Virginia, including the convention that wrote the 1792 constitution. The gubernatorial electors met in Lexington and selected him on May 17. Contemporary summaries describe the choice as unanimous, but the published result does not provide a numerical vote total.

1792 Kentucky gubernatorial selection
Candidate	Result
Isaac Shelby	Unanimously elected

== Aftermath ==
Shelby took office at Lexington on June 4, 1792, three days after Kentucky entered the Union. His administration was responsible for organizing the new state government. Kentucky used the same indirect system for the 1796 gubernatorial election. The constitution adopted in 1799 abolished the state electoral college and provided for popular election of the governor; James Garrard became the first Kentucky governor elected by popular vote in 1800.
