= Thomas E. Bramlette =

Governor of Kentucky (1817–1875)

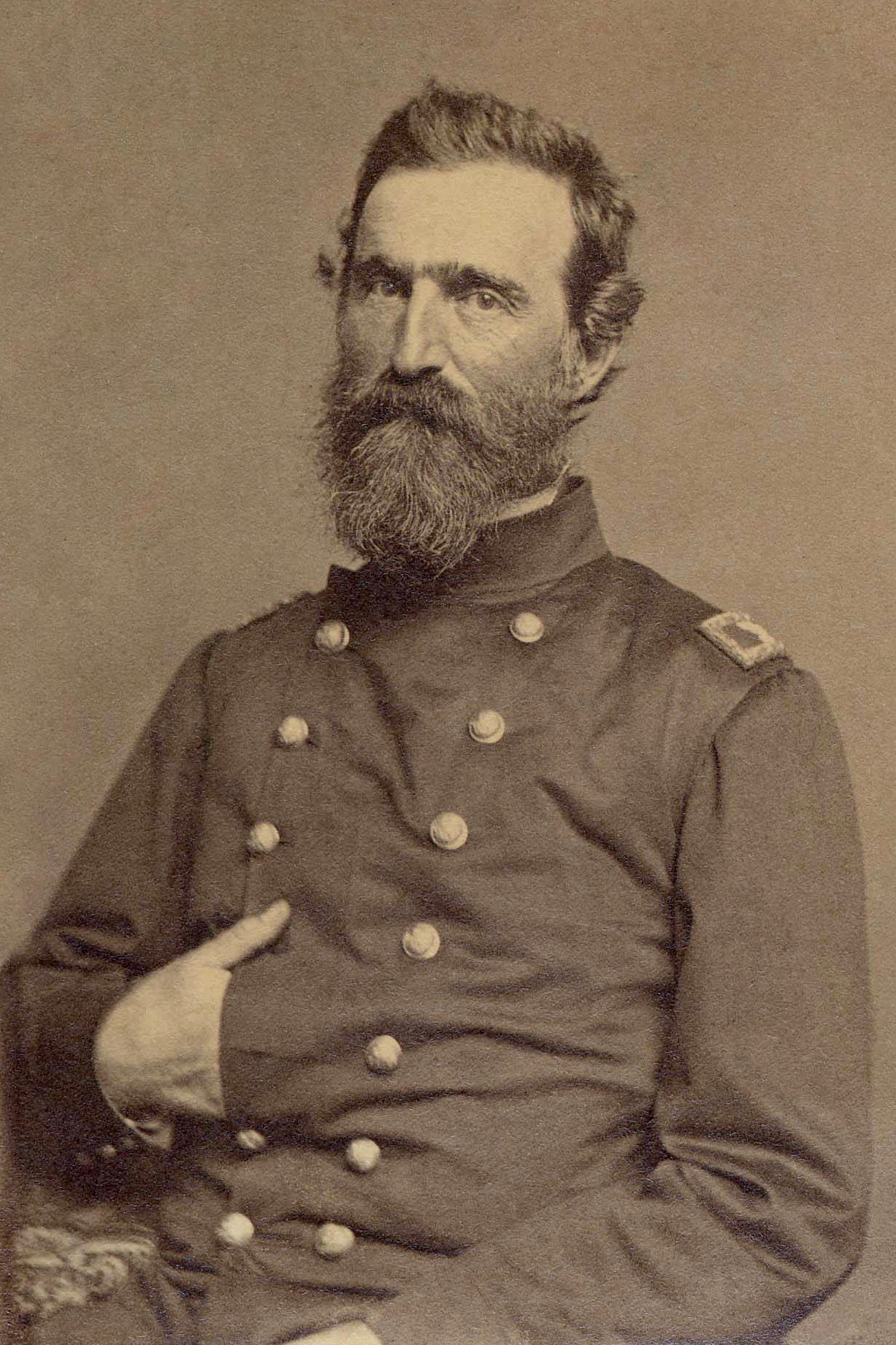
- Bramlette c. 1861-1865

23rd Governor of Kentucky
- In office September 1, 1863 – September 3, 1867
- Lieutenant: Richard Taylor Jacob
- Preceded by: James Fisher Robinson
- Succeeded by: John L. Helm

Member of the Kentucky House of Representatives
- In office August 2, 1841 – August 1, 1842
- Preceded by: James Haggard
- Succeeded by: Francis H. Winfrey

Personal details
- Born: Thomas Elliott Bramlette; January 3, 1817 Cumberland County, Kentucky, U.S.
- Died: January 12, 1875 (aged 58) Louisville, Kentucky, U.S.
- Resting place: Cave Hill Cemetery; Louisville, Kentucky, U.S.
- Party: Whig; Democrat
- Spouse(s): Sallie Travis; Mary E. Adams
- Profession: Lawyer

Military service
- Allegiance: United States Union
- Branch/service: Union Army
- Years of service: 1861 – 1862
- Rank: Colonel
- Unit: 3rd Kentucky Infantry
- Battles/wars: Civil War

Thomas Elliott Bramlette (January 3, 1817 – January 12, 1875) was the 23rd governor of Kentucky. He was elected in 1863 and guided the state through the latter part of the Civil War and the beginning of Reconstruction. At the outbreak of the war, Bramlette put his promising political career on hold and enlisted in the Union Army, raising and commanding the 3rd Kentucky Infantry. In 1862, President Abraham Lincoln appointed him district attorney for Kentucky. A year later, he was the Union Democratic Party's nominee for governor. Election interference by the Union Army gave him a landslide victory over his opponent, Charles A. Wickliffe. Within a year, however, federal policies such as recruiting Kentucky African-Americans for the Union Army and suspending the writ of habeas corpus for Kentucky citizens caused Bramlette to abandon his support of the Lincoln administration and declare that he would "bloodily baptize the state into the Confederacy".

After the war, Bramlette issued a general pardon for most ex-Confederates in the state. He opposed ratification of the Fourteenth and Fifteenth Amendments and the establishment of the Freedmen's Bureau in Kentucky. Among his accomplishments not related to the war and its aftermath were the reduction of the state's debt and the establishment of the Kentucky Agricultural and Mechanical College (now the University of Kentucky). Following his term as governor, Bramlette returned to his legal practice in Louisville. He died January 12, 1875, and was buried in Cave Hill Cemetery.

== Early life ==
Thomas Elliott Bramlette was born on January 3, 1817, at Elliott's Cross Roads in Cumberland (now Clinton) County, Kentucky. He was the son of Colonel Ambrose S. and Sarah (Elliott) Bramlette. His father served two terms in the Kentucky Senate and several terms in the Kentucky House of Representatives.

Bramlette studied law, was admitted to the bar in 1837 at the age of 20, and began practicing in Louisville, Kentucky. In September of that year, Bramlette married Sallie Travis, the first of his two wives. The couple had two children, Thomas and Corinne.

Bramlette's political career began in 1841, when he was elected to represent Clinton County in the General Assembly. In 1848, Governor John J. Crittenden appointed Bramlette Commonwealth's Attorney. He resigned the position in 1850 to continue his legal practice, relocating to Columbia, Kentucky in 1852. He was the Whig nominee for his district's seat in the House of Representatives in 1853, but was defeated by Democrat James Chrisman. In 1856, he was elected as a judge in Kentucky's 6th Judicial District, serving with distinction for five years.

== Military service ==
Bramlette resigned his judgeship and accepted a commission as a colonel in the Union Army on August 7, 1861. In violation of Kentucky's agreement to remain neutral in the Civil War, he raised and commanded the 3rd Kentucky Infantry. On September 19, the 3rd Kentucky marched on Lexington to forestall a peace conference scheduled there on September 21 and to arrest the state's junior Senator, John C. Breckinridge. A delay allowed Breckinridge to escape before the arrest was made, and he enlisted in the Confederate Army shortly thereafter.

Bramlette resigned his military commission on July 13, 1862, at Decherd, Tennessee. He returned to Louisville to accept President Abraham Lincoln's offer to become United States District Attorney for Kentucky. During his tenure in this position, he vigorously enforced Kentucky's wartime laws against Confederates and Confederate sympathizers.

== Governor of Kentucky ==
Union Democrats chose Joshua Fry Bell as their candidate for governor of Kentucky in 1863, but Bell was skeptical of Kentucky's future with the Union and withdrew his name from consideration. The party's central committee chose Bramlette to replace Bell, and Bramlette declined a commission as a brigadier general in the Union Army to make the race. During the election, Union forces intimidated and jailed supporters of Bramlette's opponent, former governor Charles A. Wickliffe. As a result, Bramlette carried the election by a margin of nearly 4-to-1. During his term, he turned down an offered seat in the U.S. House of Representatives as well as a nomination to become the Democratic candidate for Vice-President in 1864.

=== Civil War ===
In December 1863, Bramlette addressed the General Assembly, declaring that the state had fulfilled its quota of soldiers for the Union army. January 4 of the following year, he proclaimed that rebel sympathizers would be held responsible for all guerrilla raids in the state, and specified stiff fines and imprisonment for anyone found to be aiding the guerrillas.

Although Bramlette assumed the governorship as a staunch supporter of the Union cause, within a year he issued a proclamation that he would "bloodily baptize the state into the Confederacy". The reasons for Bramlette's reversal were many. He took issue with General Stephen Burbridge's decision to enlist for United States Colored Troops blacks from Kentucky for military service, asking that this measure only be taken if Kentucky failed to meet her quota.

With the goal of enlistment of Kentucky blacks into the Union Army, Lincoln authorized a special census in 1863 which showed 1,650 freemen and 40,000 enslaved males of military age. Presented with this figure, by March 1864, Bramlette reluctantly agreed to Black enlistment since white enlistment failed to meet quota. He stipulated that owners must consent and receive $300. By April, enslaved men, despite the stipulation of owner consent and motivated by the prospect for their emancipation, fled to enlist. This led to a wave of violence towards those seeking enlistment. Given this onslaught, by June 1864 owners’ consent was no longer required, as ordered by Union Army Adj. Gen. Lorenzo Thomas.

The situation worsened when on July 5, 1864, President Lincoln suspended the writ of habeas corpus for citizens of the Commonwealth. Burbridge continually menaced Kentucky's citizens, interfering with the presidential election of 1864, and banishing Lieutenant Governor Richard T. Jacob from the state. When the General Assembly re-convened in January 1865, Bramlette continued to voice his opposition to the Union's tactics. Nevertheless, he urged passage of the Thirteenth Amendment, maintaining that the institution of slavery was "irrevocably doomed".

=== Reconstruction era ===
Despite his disagreements with the Lincoln administration, Bramlette proclaimed a day of fasting and prayer upon receiving news of Lincoln's assassination. The General Assembly petitioned new president Andrew Johnson to call an end to martial law in the state. The tension between the state and federal governments remained, however. Bramlette announced that every "white male citizen" twenty-one years of age who had resided in the Commonwealth for at least two years would be eligible to vote. Spurred on by the Democratic governor's actions, Kentucky gave control of both houses of the General Assembly and five of its nine congressional seats to Democrats. President Johnson received the message, ending martial law and restoring habeas corpus in Kentucky.

When the General Assembly convened in December 1865, Bramlette sought to restore harmony in the state by issuing pardons to most ex-Confederates. He and the majority of the General Assembly opposed passage of the Fourteenth and Fifteenth amendments, and Bramlette protested the establishment of the Freedmen's Bureau in the Commonwealth.

Bramlette was very proud of those of his accomplishments not related to the Civil War, including the reduction of the state's debt and the establishment of the Agricultural and Mechanical College (later, the University of Kentucky). He supported the construction of turnpikes financed by government bonds, the development of natural resources, and encouraged immigration to obtain adequate labor to support reconstruction efforts.

== Later life and death ==
Following his term as governor, Bramlette conducted a failed campaign to become a U.S. Senator. He married Mary E. Graham Adams in 1874, two years after the death of his first wife. He returned to his law practice in Louisville, and became a patron of many charitable organizations.

Bramlette died in Louisville on January 12, 1875, following a brief illness. He is buried at Cave Hill Cemetery in Louisville.

== See also ==
- Kentucky in the Civil War

Party political offices
Preceded by Joshua Fry Bell	Union Democratic nominee for Governor of Kentucky; 1863	Succeeded by None
Political offices
Preceded by James Fisher Robinson	Governor of Kentucky; 1863–1867	Succeeded by John L. Helm
