= 1796 Kentucky gubernatorial election =

Election for governor of Kentucky

- May 1796
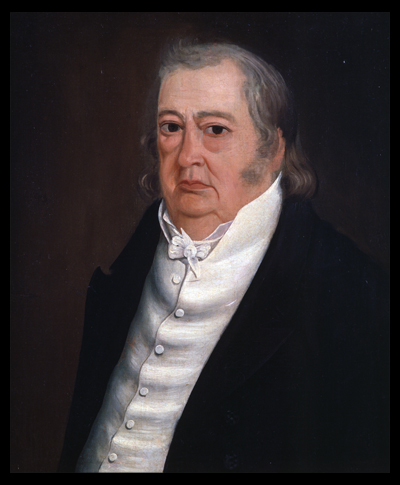

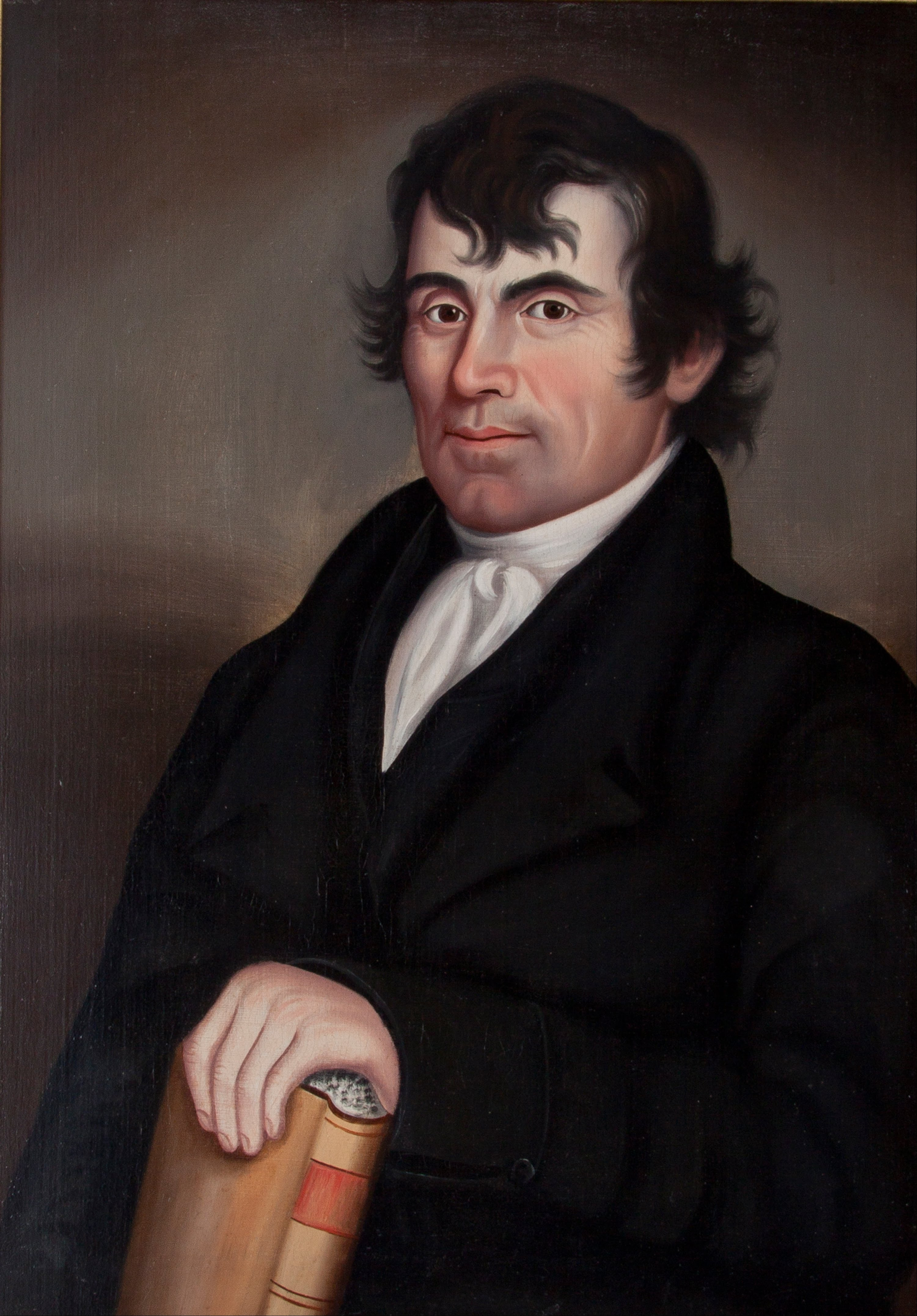
| Nominee | James Garrard | Benjamin Logan |
| Party | Democratic-Republican | Democratic-Republican |
| First ballot | 17 | 21 |
Governor before election
Isaac Shelby
Democratic-Republican
Elected Governor
James Garrard
Democratic-Republican

The 1796 Kentucky gubernatorial election was conducted in May 1796 to choose the second governor of Kentucky. Under the Kentucky Constitution of 1792, voters did not elect the governor directly; they elected a body of electors that selected the governor.

On the first ballot, frontier military leader Benjamin Logan received a plurality but not a majority. James Garrard, a farmer, Baptist minister and veteran of Kentucky's statehood conventions, finished second, while attorney Thomas Todd finished third. Sitting United States senator John Brown, who was not an announced candidate, received one vote.

Because the constitution did not state whether a plurality was sufficient for election, the electors held a second ballot between Logan and Garrard. Garrard received a majority on the second ballot and was declared elected; the exact second-ballot totals have not been found. Logan challenged the legality of the second ballot, but neither the attorney general nor the Kentucky Senate overturned the result.

== Background ==
Kentucky's first constitution provided for indirect election of both the governor and the state senate. Electors were chosen by the voters from the same districts used to elect members of the Kentucky House of Representatives. The electors then met to select the governor and senators. The system was used for the election of Isaac Shelby as Kentucky's first governor in 1792 and again for the election of his successor in 1796.

The principal candidates to succeed Shelby were Logan, Garrard and Todd. Logan was widely known for his military service on the Kentucky frontier. Garrard had represented Kentucky in several conventions concerning separation from Virginia and had participated in the convention that drafted the 1792 constitution. Todd had served as secretary to Kentucky's statehood conventions and was regarded as an experienced lawyer and public official. All three were associated with the Jeffersonian or Democratic-Republican political tendency, but the contest preceded modern party primaries and organized gubernatorial tickets.

== Electoral-college vote ==
Both Logan and Garrard were themselves chosen as electors. On the first ballot, Logan received 21 votes, Garrard 17, Todd 14 and Brown one. No candidate therefore received a majority of the 53 votes reported in published scholarly accounts. (Note: The contemporary-source database A New Nation Votes transcribes the first ballot as Logan 21, Garrard 16, Todd 14 and Brown 1, for a total of 52. Dietzman and Everman give Garrard 17 votes, for a total of 53. The discrepancy does not change the candidates' order or the second-ballot outcome.)

First ballot
| Candidate | Affiliation | Electoral votes |
|---|---|---|
| Benjamin Logan | Democratic-Republican | 21 |
| James Garrard | Democratic-Republican | 17 |
| Thomas Todd | Democratic-Republican | 14 |
| John Brown | Democratic-Republican | 1 |
| Total | | 53 |

The constitution did not expressly say whether the candidate with a plurality should be elected or whether a majority was required. The electors decided to conduct a second ballot limited to Logan and Garrard. Most of Todd's supporters switched to Garrard, who won a majority and was declared governor. The surviving contemporary account confirms Garrard's victory but does not provide the second-ballot totals.

== Dispute and aftermath ==
Logan argued that the electors lacked constitutional authority to conduct a second ballot and that his first-ballot plurality had entitled him to the governorship. He asked Attorney General John Breckinridge whether Garrard had been legally elected. Breckinridge declined to issue an official ruling, maintaining that neither the constitution nor state law authorized him to decide the dispute, although he privately believed that Logan had the stronger legal claim. Logan then appealed to the Kentucky Senate, which declined to remove Garrard.

Garrard assumed office in June 1796 and served as Kentucky's second governor. The disputed election became one of several complaints directed at the 1792 constitution. Kentucky's second constitution, adopted in 1799, abolished the state electoral-college method and provided for direct popular election of the governor. Garrard subsequently won reelection by popular vote in 1800.
