= 3rd Kentucky Infantry Regiment (Union) =

3rd Regiment Kentucky Volunteer Infantry
- Active: October 8, 1861 - January 10, 1865
- Country: United States
- Allegiance: Union
- Branch: Infantry
- Engagements: Siege of Corinth; Battle of Perryville; Battle of Stones River; Tullahoma Campaign; Battle of Chickamauga; Chattanooga campaign Battle of Missionary Ridge; Atlanta campaign Battle of Resaca; Battle of Kennesaw Mountain; Siege of Atlanta; Battle of Peachtree Creek; Battle of Jonesboro; Battle of Nashville

The 3rd Regiment Kentucky Volunteer Infantry was an infantry regiment that served in the Union Army during the American Civil War.

== Service ==
The 3rd Kentucky Infantry was organized at Camp Dick Robinson and mustered in for a three-year enlistment on October 8, 1861, under the command of Colonel Thomas Elliott Bramlette.

The regiment was attached to Thomas' Command to November 1861. 11th Brigade, Army of the Ohio, to December 1861. Unattached, London, Kentucky, Army of the Ohio, to March 1862. 15th Brigade, 4th Division, Army of the Ohio, March 1862. 20th Brigade, 6th Division, Army of the Ohio, March 1862. 15th Brigade, 6th Division, Army of the Ohio, to September 1862. 15th Brigade, 6th Division, II Corps, Army of the Ohio, to November 1862. 1st Brigade, 1st Division, Left Wing, XIV Corps, Army of the Cumberland, to January 1863. 1st Brigade, 1st Division, XXI Corps, Army of the Cumberland, to April 1863. 3rd Brigade, 1st Division, XXI Corps, to October 1863. 3rd Brigade, 2nd Division, IV Corps, to January 1865.

The 3rd Kentucky Infantry mustered out of service at Louisville, Kentucky, by company beginning October 13, 1864, and ending January 10, 1865.

== Detailed service ==
Moved to Lexington, Kentucky, September 1861, and duty there until October 1. Moved to Camp Dick Robinson, Kentucky, October 1. Duty there, at Round Stone Creek, Crab Orchard, Somerset, and Columbia until January 1862. Moved to Renick's Creek, near Burkesville, January 7, and to mouth of Greasy Creek January 17. Moved to Nashville, Tennessee, March 18–25; then marched to Savannah, Tennessee, and to Shiloh March 29-April 7. Advance on and siege of Corinth, Mississippi, April 29-May 30. Pursuit to Booneville May 30-June 6. Buell's Campaign in northern Alabama and middle Tennessee June to August. March to Nashville, Tennessee, and Louisville, Kentucky, in pursuit of Bragg, August 19-September 26. Pursuit of Bragg into Kentucky October 1–18. Battle of Perryville October 8. Nelson's Cross Roads, Kentucky, October 18. March to Nashville, Tennessee, October 18-November 7, and duty there until December 26. Advance on Murfreesboro December 26–30. Stewart's Creek December 29. Battle of Stones River December 30–31, 1862 and January 1–3, 1863. Duty at Murfreesboro until June. Reconnaissance to Nolensville and Versailles January 13–15. Tullahoma Campaign June 23-July 7. Occupation of middle Tennessee until August 16. Passage of Cumberland Mountains and Tennessee River and Chickamauga Campaign August 16-September 22. Reconnaissance toward Chattanooga September 7. Lookout Valley September 7–8. Occupation of Chattanooga September 9. Lee and Gordon's Mills September 11–13. Near Lafayette September 14. Battle of Chickamauga September 19–20. Siege of Chattanooga September 24-October 26 Reopening Tennessee River October 26–29. Chattanooga-Ringgold Campaign November 23–27. Orchard Knob November 23–24. Missionary Ridge November 25. Pursuit to Graysville November 26–27. March to relief of Knoxville November 28-December 8. Campaign in eastern Tennessee until April 1864. March to Charleston April 18–26. Atlanta Campaign May to September. Demonstrations on Rocky Faced Ridge and Dalton May 5–13. Tunnel Hill May 6–7. Buzzard's Roost Gap May 8–9. Rocky Faced Ridge May 8–11. Battle of Resaca May 14–15. Near Calhoun May 16. Adairsville May 17. Near Kingston May 18–19. Near Cassville May 19. Advance on Dallas May 22–25. Operations on line of Pumpkin Vine Creek and battles about Dallas, New Hope Church, and Allatoona Hills May 25-June 5. Operations about Marietta and against Kennesaw Mountain June 10-July 2. Pine Hill June 11–14. Lost Mountain June 15–17. Assault on Kennesaw June 27. Ruff's Station, Smyrna Camp Ground, July 4. Chattahoochie River July 5–17. Buckhead, Nancy's Creek, July 18. Peachtree Creek July 19–20. Siege of Atlanta July 22-August 25. Flank movement on Jonesboro August 25–30. Battle of Jonesboro August 31-September 1. Lovejoy's Station September 2–6. Moved to Nashville, Tennessee, September 9–12; then to Louisville, Kentucky, October 6.

== Casualties ==
The regiment lost a total of 301 men during service; 6 officers and 103 enlisted men killed or mortally wounded, 192 enlisted men died of disease.

== Commanders ==
- Colonel Thomas E. Bramlette
- Colonel Samuel McKee
- Colonel Henry Clay Dunlap
- Lieutenant Colonel William Scott
- Major Daniel R. Collier

== See also ==
- List of Kentucky Civil War Units
- Kentucky in the Civil War
