= 1951 United States gubernatorial elections =

- November 6, 1951 (KY and MS); April 22, 1952 (LA)

3 governorships
	Majority party	Minority party
Party	Republican	Democratic
Seats before	25	23
Seats after	25	23
Seat change	Steady	Steady
Seats up	0	3
Seats won	0	3
- Democratic hold

United States gubernatorial elections were held in 1951, in three states. Kentucky, Louisiana and Mississippi hold their gubernatorial elections in odd numbered years, every 4 years, preceding the United States presidential election year.

== Race summary ==
=== Results ===
State	Incumbent	Party	First elected	Result	Candidates
Kentucky	Lawrence Wetherby	Democratic	1950 (Note: Wetherby took office after his predecessor (Earle Clements) resigned.)	Incumbent elected to full term.	✓ Lawrence Wetherby (Democratic) 54.60%; Eugene Siler (Republican) 45.40%
Louisiana (Held, 22 April 1952)	Earl Long	Democratic	1939 (Note: Long took office after his predecessor (Richard W. Leche) resigned.); 1940 (lost nomination); 1948	Incumbent term-limited. New governor elected. Democratic hold.	✓ Robert F. Kennon (Democratic) 95.99%; Harrison Bagwell (Republican) 4.01%
Mississippi	Fielding L. Wright	Democratic	1946 (Note: Wright took office after his predecessor (Thomas L. Bailey) died. He was subsequently elected in the 1947 Mississippi gubernatorial election.)	Incumbent term-limited. New governor elected. Democratic hold.	✓ Hugh L. White (Democratic); Unopposed
