= 1951 Mississippi gubernatorial election =

1951 Mississippi Democratic gubernatorial primary runoff
- November 6, 1951
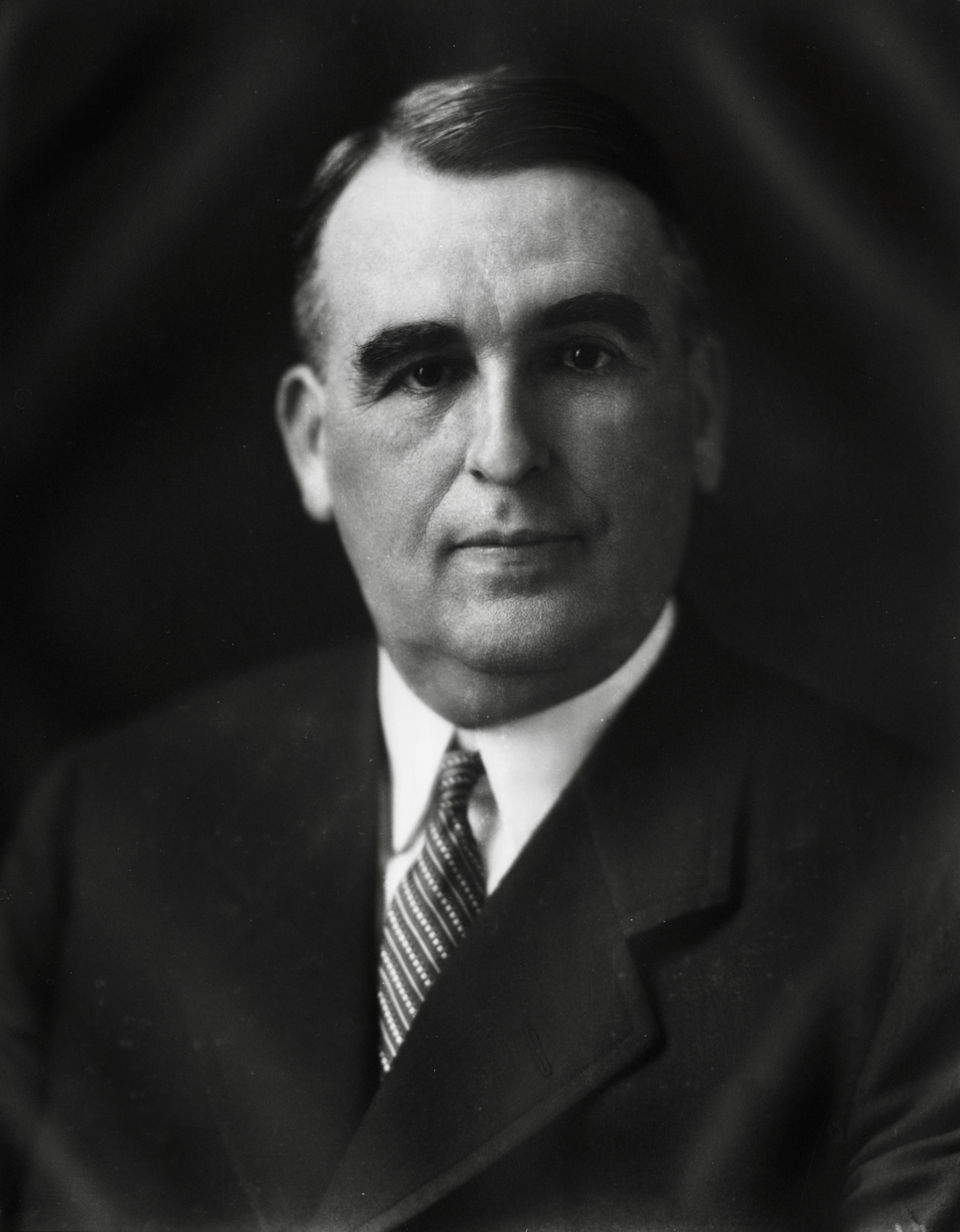

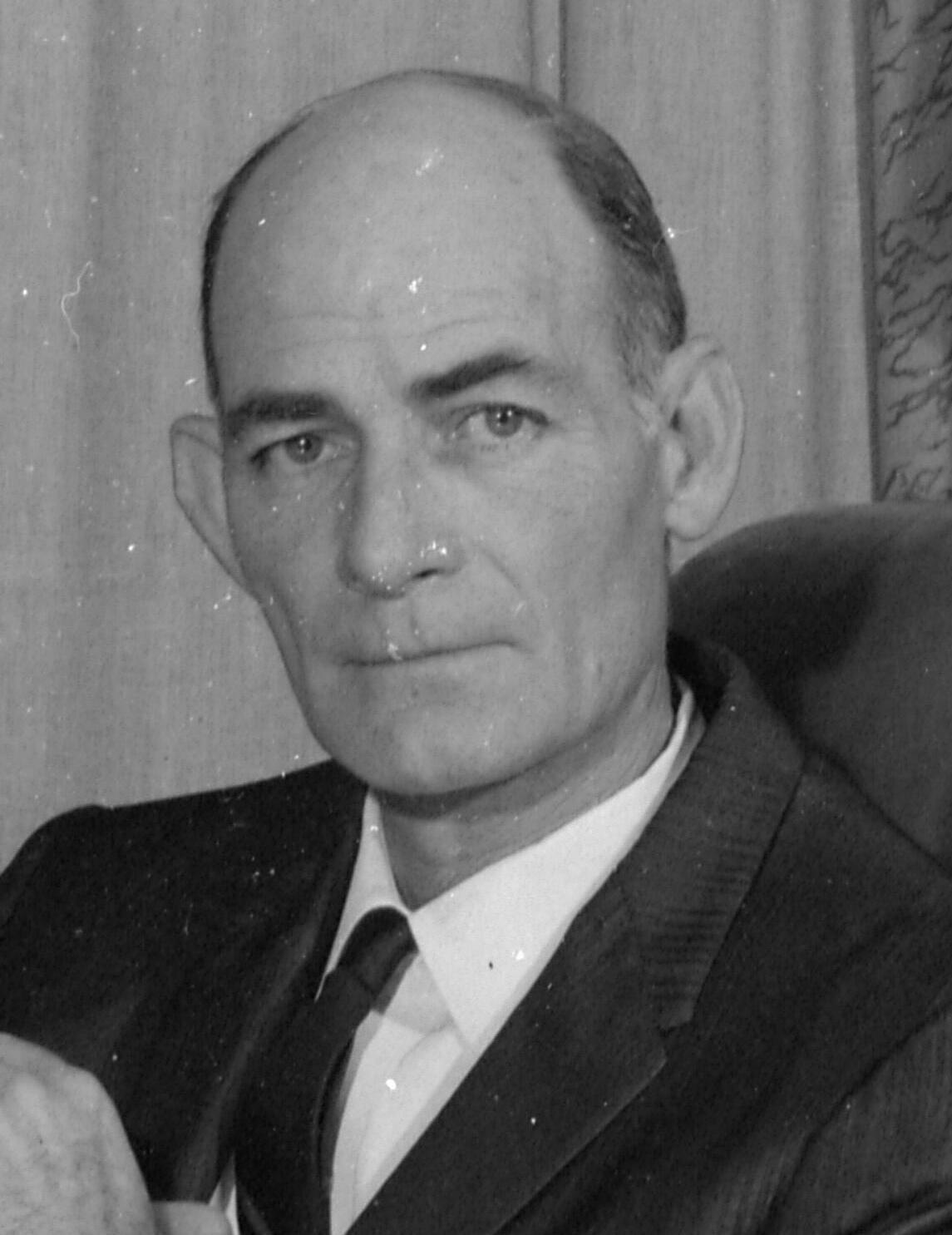
Nominee	Hugh L. White	Paul B. Johnson Jr.
Party	Democratic	Democratic
Popular vote	201,222	191,966
Percentage	51.18%	48.82%
- County results White: 50–60% 60–70% 70–80% Johnson: 50–60% 60–70%
Governor before election
Fielding L. Wright
Democratic
Elected Governor
Hugh L. White
Democratic

The 1951 Mississippi gubernatorial election took place on November 6, 1951, in order to elect the Governor of Mississippi. Incumbent Democrat Fielding L. Wright was term-limited, and could not run for reelection to a second full term. As was common at the time, the Democratic candidate ran unopposed in the general election; therefore the Democratic primary was the real contest, and winning the primary was considered tantamount to election.

== Democratic primary ==
No candidate received a majority in the Democratic primary, which featured seven contenders, so a runoff was held between the top two candidates. The runoff election was won by former Governor Hugh L. White, who defeated lawyer Paul B. Johnson Jr., son of former Governor Paul B. Johnson Sr.

=== Results ===
Mississippi Democratic gubernatorial primary, 1951
Party	Candidate	Votes	%
Democratic	Hugh L. White	94,721	23.19
Democratic	Paul B. Johnson Jr.	86,152	21.09
Democratic	Sam Lumpkin	84,401	20.66
Democratic	Ross Barnett	81,674	19.99
Democratic	Mary D. Cain	24,757	6.06
Democratic	Jesse M. Byrd	23,676	5.80
Democratic	Kelly Hammond	6,952	1.70
Total votes		402,333	100.00

=== Runoff ===
Mississippi Democratic gubernatorial primary runoff, 1951
Party	Candidate	Votes	%
Democratic	Hugh L. White	201,222	51.18
Democratic	Paul B. Johnson Jr.	191,966	48.82
Total votes		393,188	100.00

== General election ==
In the general election, White ran unopposed.

=== Results ===
Mississippi gubernatorial election, 1951
Party	Candidate	Votes	%
Democratic	Hugh L. White	43,422	100.00
Total votes		43,422	100.00
Democratic hold			
