= Fielding L. Wright =

American politician (1895–1956)

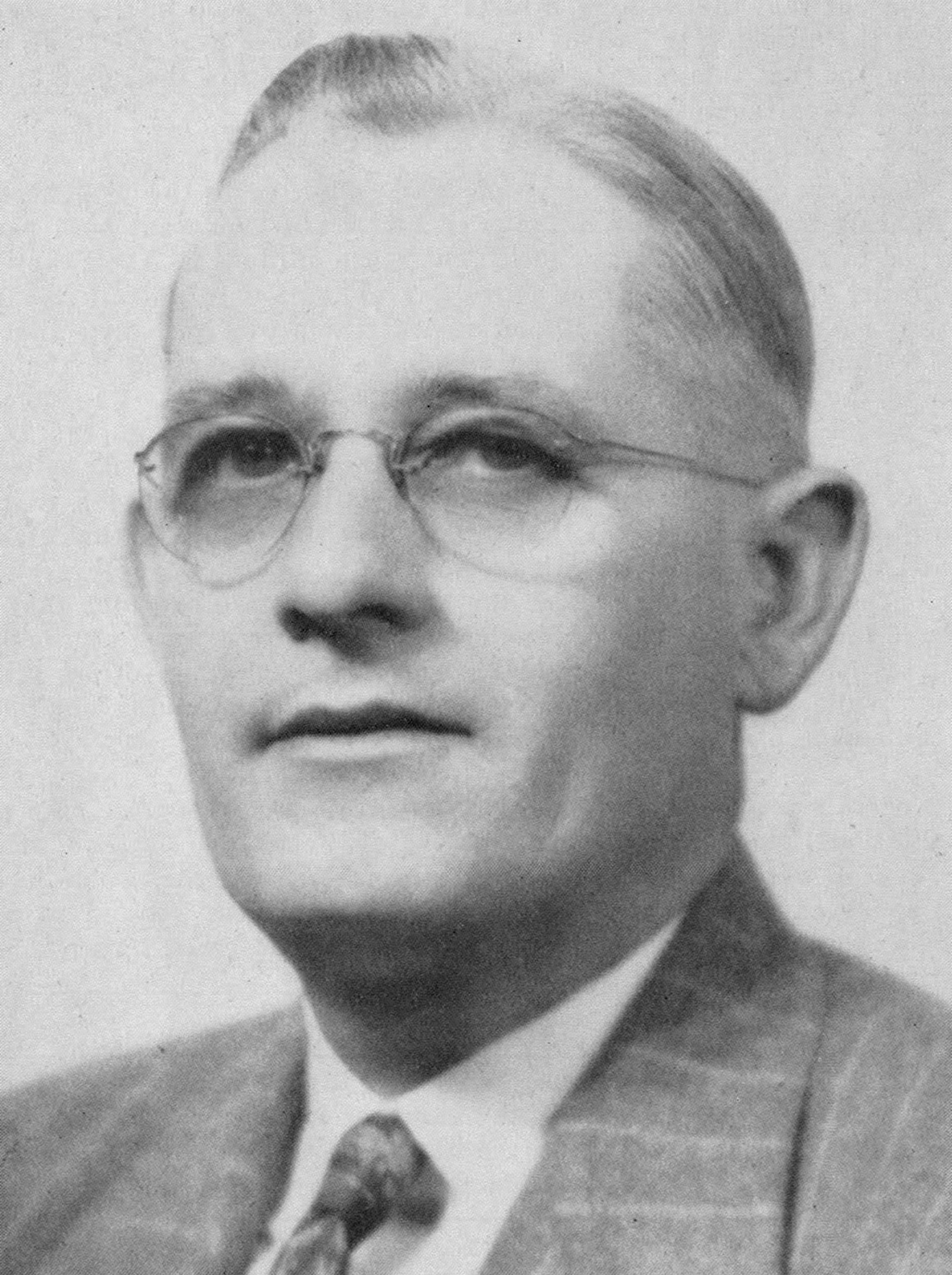

49th and 50th Governor of Mississippi
- In office November 2, 1946 – January 22, 1952
- Lieutenant: Sam Lumpkin
- Preceded by: Thomas L. Bailey
- Succeeded by: Hugh L. White

25th Lieutenant Governor of Mississippi
- In office January 17, 1944 – November 2, 1946
- Governor: Dennis Murphree; Thomas L. Bailey
- Preceded by: Dennis Murphree
- Succeeded by: Sam Lumpkin

54th Speaker of the Mississippi House of Representatives
- In office September 14, 1936 – January 2, 1940
- Preceded by: Horace Stansel
- Succeeded by: Sam Lumpkin

Acting Speaker of the Mississippi House of Representatives
- In office February 1936 – September 14, 1936

Member of the Mississippi House of Representatives
- In office January 5, 1932 – January 2, 1940

Member of the Mississippi State Senate from the 20th District
- In office 1928 – January 5, 1932

Personal details
- Born: Fielding Lewis Wright; May 16, 1895 Rolling Fork, Mississippi, U.S.
- Died: May 4, 1956 (aged 60) Jackson, Mississippi, U.S.
- Party: Democratic
- Other political affiliations: Dixiecrat (1948)
- Spouse: Nan Kelly
- Education: Gardner–Webb University; University of Alabama (LLB)

Military service
- Allegiance: United States
- Branch/service: United States Army
- Years of service: 1918–1919
- Rank: Private
- Unit: 38th Infantry Division; 105th Engineer Combat Battalion; Mississippi National Guard
- Battles/wars: World War I

Fielding Lewis Wright (May 16, 1895 – May 4, 1956) was an American politician who served as the 25th lieutenant governor and 49th and 50th governor of Mississippi. During the 1948 presidential election he served as the vice presidential nominee of the States' Rights Democratic Party (Dixiecrats) alongside presidential nominee Strom Thurmond. During his political career he fought to maintain racial segregation, fighting with President Harry S. Truman over civil rights legislation, and holding other racist views.

Wright grew up in Rolling Fork, Mississippi, where he was educated and later attended Gardner–Webb University and the University of Alabama. During World War I he was sent to France as a captain. Wright served in the 149th Machine Gun Battalion and the 105th Engineer Combat Battalion before being honorably discharged in 1919. Following his service in the United States Army, he joined the Mississippi National Guard.

After entering politics in the 1920s, Wright was elected to the state legislature, where he served in the late 1920s and through the 1930s. Following the death of Speaker Horace Stansel, he rose to the speakership of the state House of Representatives. After a brief absence from politics, Wright was elected as Mississippi's lieutenant governor and served until he ascended to the governorship following the death of Thomas L. Bailey on November 2, 1946. During his gubernatorial tenure he made efforts to maintain racial segregation and supported Senator Theodore G. Bilbo, a member of the Ku Klux Klan and segregationist, in his attempt to maintain his seat in the United States Senate. Over the two decades prior to his becoming governor, Wright had (according to one observer) “been acclaimed for his progressive legislative record in transportation, education, tax policy, industrial development, natural resource conservation, public health, old-age pensions, and welfare.”

Wright was elected to a term in his own right in the 1947 election. In his inaugural address, he voiced opposition to Truman's support of civil rights and called for Southern Democrats to leave the Democratic Party. He served as a leader of the States' Rights Democratic Party, declining offers to run for the presidential nomination, although he later accepted the vice-presidential nomination. In the presidential election, Thurmond and Wright won multiple Southern states, but failed to prevent Truman from winning the presidential election. Wright completed his gubernatorial term on January 22, 1952, and retired from public service. He unsuccessfully sought the Democratic nomination in the 1955 Mississippi gubernatorial election, and died on May 4, 1956.

== Early life and education ==
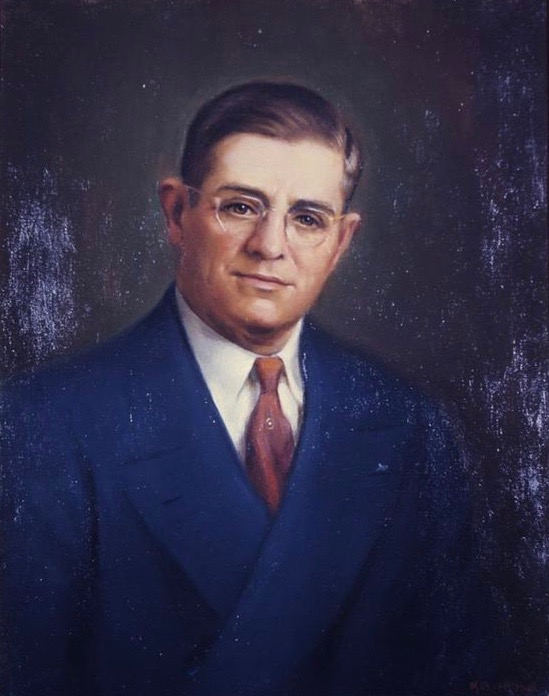
From 1944 to 1946, Wright served under Governor Thomas L. Bailey until he succeeded him following Bailey's death.

Fielding Lewis Wright was born on May 16, 1895, in Rolling Fork, Mississippi, to Frances Foote Clements and Henry James Wright and was named after his uncle, Colonel Fielding Lewis. In 1901, he entered elementary school and graduated in 1911, as a member of the school's second graduating class. Wright attended Gardner–Webb University and the University of Alabama, graduating with a law degree and was later admitted to the legal bar in September 1916. On July 16, 1917, he married Nan Kelly, with whom he had two children.

=== Military ===
In April 1918, Wright enlisted into the United States Army and was given the rank of private at Camp Shelby. He served as a member of the 149th Machine Gun Battalion inside the 38th Infantry Division. He later served as the commander of the 105th Engineer Combat Battalion. During World War I he participated in the battles of Belleau Wood and Château-Thierry before being honorably discharged on August 31, 1919. After leaving the army he organized a unit of the Mississippi National Guard in Rolling Fork and was selected to serve as its first captain where he would lead the unit through the Great Mississippi Flood of 1927.

== Career ==
=== Local politics ===
During the 1920s Wright served two terms on the Rolling Fork Board of Alderman. In 1927, he was elected to represent the Twentieth district in the state senate and served until 1932. In 1929 he authored a paved highway bill, but it was vetoed by Governor Theodore G. Bilbo due to disputes over the program's implementation. In 1930, he was appointed to serve as the assistant director of the state tax commission to aid in the enforcement and administration of the tax laws.

=== Mississippi House of Representatives ===
In 1932, Wright was elected to the state House of Representatives and served until 1940. In 1932, he was appointed to serve as the chairman of the House Committee on Highways and Highway Financing. In 1936, he was appointed to serve as the chairman of the House Rules Committee and was also appointed onto the Levees committee and the Joint Committee on Executive Contingent Fund. On March 19, 1936, he introduced a resolution proposing a state constitutional amendment that would allow for the election of highway commission members starting in the 1938 elections, but the resolution failed. Facing opposition from House and statewide leadership for his highway reforms, he helped organize the removal of Speaker Thomas L. Bailey and his replacement by a fellow highway advocate, Horace Stansel. Stansel made Wright chairman of the House Rules Committee.

==== Speaker of the House ====
In February 1936, Speaker Stansel requested for Wright to be designated as the acting Speaker of the House and the request was accepted. On April 4, Stansel died from a heart attack while Wright was still serving as the acting Speaker and Wright participated in the planning of Stansel's funeral.

From June 23 to 27, 1936, Governor Hugh L. White was outside of Mississippi to attend the Democratic national convention causing Lieutenant Governor Jacob Buehler Snider to become the acting governor. When Snider left the state, John Culkin, President pro tempore of the Senate, was elevated to acting governor. If Culkin had left the state the Speaker of the House would have become the acting governor, but Wright was not eligible as he was in an acting role. However, Culkin did not leave the state which prevented a constitutional crisis over the succession of acting governor.

On September 14, 1936, he was nominated by Pearl Stansel and the House of Representatives voted by acclamation, as he faced no opposition despite statements made by John Armstrong and Ira L. Morgan about being interested in running, to formally appoint Wright as the Speaker of the House.

After being appointed to the speakership Wright appointed Hilton Waits to replace him as the chairman of the House Rules committee and appointed R. E. Lee to replace him as the chairman of the Highways and Highway Financing House committee. Waits resigned shortly after being appointed as chairman of the House Rules Committee and Joe Owen was selected by Wright to replace him. Wright would continue to serve as Speaker of the House until 1940.

On March 24, 1938, the House of Representatives voted twenty-one to nineteen in favor of drafting articles of impeachment against Land Commissioner R. D. Moore. Wright appointed a five-man committee of Walter Sillers, John T. Armstrong, Gerald Chatham, Guy B. Mitchell, and Sam Lumpkin to draft the articles of impeachment. Moore criticized the committee as being "stacked" against his favor by Wright.

=== Interlude ===
Although it was speculated that Wright would run in the lieutenant gubernatorial election in 1939, he announced on July 19, 1938, that he would not seek another term in the House of Representatives and would not seek election to another office.

After leaving the state house he started working for the law firm of John Brunini and Sons in Rolling Fork. In 1942, he represented the Union Producing company at a House Ways and Means committee to argue for Mississippi to place flat taxes on oil producers rather than multiple severance and sales taxes. After the United States entered World War II Wright attempted to rejoin the army, but was rejected due to his poor eyesight.

=== Lieutenant gubernatorial ===
On November 19, 1942, Wright met with friends in Jackson, Mississippi, and stated that he would be a candidate in the lieutenant gubernatorial election. In January 1943, he formally announced his candidacy for the Democratic nomination for the lieutenant gubernatorial election. Walter D. Davis, a former member of the state House of Representatives and attorney in the Department of War, was appointed to serve as his campaign manager.

In the initial primary he won with a plurality of the vote ahead of Paul Spearman and Charles G. Hamilton, who were eliminated, and John Lumpkin, who would continue onto the runoff primary. Wright defeated Lumpkin in the runoff with 155,265 to 108,661 votes winning the Democratic nomination. In the general election he and gubernatorial nominee Thomas L. Bailey faced no opposition.

The state House and Senate passed a resolution allowing for Wright to be inaugurated one day before Bailey and Wright was inaugurated as the Lieutenant Governor of Mississippi on January 17, 1944. On March 21, 1944, he gave his first tie breaking vote, in which he voted in favor, when the state Senate voted nineteen in favor to nineteen against on a bill authorizing chancery clerks to use photostat machines in recording records. In April 1944, Wright became acting governor when Governor Bailey went to Kansas City to attend the Methodist general conference as one of Mississippi's two delegates.

In 1946, he attempted to call another session of the state legislature to have the state's election laws changed to prevent black voters from participating in the 1947 primaries. In June 1946, he refused to authorize the extradition of George Johnson, a black man facing charges of child abandonment, back to California and refused to commute the death sentence of James Leo Williams, a 25 year old black man convicted for murder, while serving as acting governor. On August 1, 1946, he was made aware of plans by the Department of Justice to investigate the activities of the Ku Klux Klan in Mississippi. Wright claimed that he did not know of any activities conducted by the Ku Klux Klan and that the organization had not existed in the state since 1923.

=== Gubernatorial ===
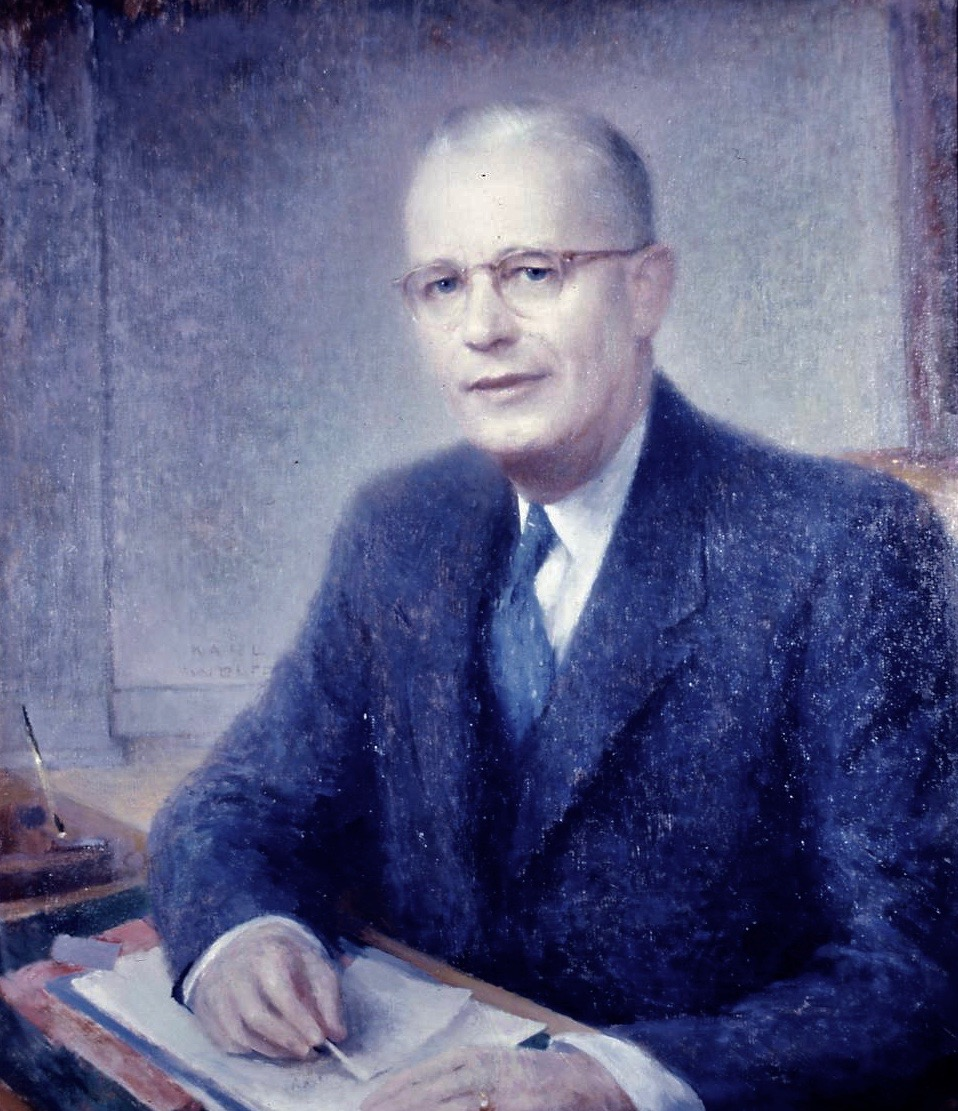
Portrait of Governor Wright.

==== First term ====
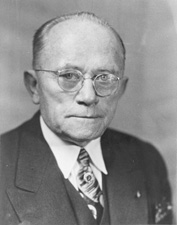
Wright supported Senator Theodore G. Bilbo after the Senate refused to seat him and later praised him following his death.

On October 30, 1946, Governor Bailey suffered a stroke and was in poor health for the next four days until he died from a spinal tumor on November 2. Wright was supposed to leave the state for a physical checkup, but remained in Mississippi due to Bailey's poor health and succeeded him following his death to fulfill the remainder of his term as the 49th governor. On November 7, he was formally inaugurated by Chief Justice Sydney M. Smith without a ceremony.

The United States Senate, controlled by a Republican majority, refused to seat Senator Theodore G. Bilbo at the request of Senator Glen H. Taylor. Wright threatened to appoint Bilbo to serve as an interim senator if he was not allowed to be seated, for which the Harrison County affiliate of the Bilbo Campaign Committee passed a resolution praising Wright. The issue was resolved when it was proposed that Bilbo's credentials remain on the table while he returned home to Mississippi to seek medical treatment for oral cancer. When Bilbo died on August 21, 1947, Wright stated that "He was a long and faithful servant of the state. He was an outstanding official whose loss will be felt by Mississippi."

On May 20, the Amalgamated Association of Street, Electric Railway and Motor Coach Employees of America, affiliated with the American Federation of Labor, organized a walkout and strike to improve the wages of bus drivers working for Southern Trailways, the Mississippi affiliate of the Trailways Transportation System. On September 28, a man driving a carnival truck attempted to crash into two Trailway buses and later another driver attempted to crash a bus off a highway near Winona. On October 1, Wright threatened to place members of the Mississippi National Guard onboard every bus with orders to shoot to protect the buses. In November, the Mississippi Bureau of Investigation was formed as a temporarily state police force to prevent further violence during the strike, although it was criticized as similar to the Gestapo and the Veterans of Foreign Wars post in Hattiesburg passed a resolution calling it fascist, Wright successfully transformed it into a permanent police force.

==== 1947 election ====
On January 25, 1947, Wright announced his intention to seek election to a term in his own right in the 1947 Mississippi gubernatorial election. Paul B. Johnson Jr., the son of former governor and representative Paul B. Johnson Sr., later announced his intention to challenge Wright in the Democratic primary. On June 12, he formally launched his campaign at a campaign rally in Rolling Fork where he showed his twenty-point platform which included support for veteran benefits, road improvements, sales tax exemptions, and stopping outside influence on Mississippi.

On August 5, he won the Democratic primary with over 55% of the popular vote and later received a letter of congratulations from Johnson, who had placed second in the primary. Wright's first ballot victory was the second time in Mississippi history that the Democratic gubernatorial nominee won without a runoff being needed, with Theodore G. Bilbo's 1915 victory being the first. In the general election he defeated former Nebraskan Governor George L. Sheldon, who ran on the ballot as an Independent Republican and who had stated that he had only expected to receive a few thousand votes against Wright.

==== Second term ====
On January 20, 1948, Wright was inaugurated as the 50th Governor of Mississippi by Chief Justice Sydney M. Smith. In his inaugural address he called for Southern Democrats to abandon the Democratic Party due to the Fair Employment Practice Committee, and anti-poll tax, anti-lynching, and pro-civil rights measures. He also criticized President Harry S. Truman for his committee on civil rights and support for other "anti-southern" legislation.

His speech and call for Southern Democrats to leave the party was praised by Senator James Eastland and Representatives John Bell Williams and Jamie Whitten who stated that they had been ignored by the party's leadership and should not allow the region's racial beliefs to be undermined. However, Senators Allen J. Ellender and Claude Pepper, Representative William Madison Whittington, Governor Benjamin Travis Laney, and Alabama Democratic Chairman Gessner T. McCorvey criticized him stating that they should remain in the party to reform it from the inside. On January 21, the state house and senate approved resolutions supporting threats to leave the party if more "anti-southern" legislation was passed.

In April, the state legislature passed the first workers' compensation bill in Mississippi history and it was later signed into law by Wright. Secretary of Labor Lewis B. Schwellenbach praised the passage of the bill as Mississippi was the last of the then forty-eight states to pass a workers' compensation bill.

On July 8, Lycurgus Spinks, who had run in the 1947 Democratic gubernatorial primary and was an Imperial Emperor of the United Klans of America, filed a $50,000 lawsuit against Wright claiming that Wright, W.W. Wright, and George Godwin had convinced John L. Dagget to cancel a contract he had with Spinks. On January 11, 1949, Spinks' lawsuit was dismissed by Judge Sidney Carr Mize of the Southern District Court of Mississippi, but Spinks refiled his lawsuit. On June 29, Spinks removed Wright from his lawsuit, but continued his lawsuit against W. W. Wright and George Godwin.

On September 7, Wright declared a state of emergency as Mississippi had suffered its second highest number of polio cases in its history during 1949.

==== Segregation ====
In February 1948, a "State-wide Mass Meeting of Negro citizens" organized in Jackson, Mississippi, and called for a biracial committee to oversee the educational improvement project that was started in 1946, but Wright declined their request.

Due to federal threats to force the integration of schools Wright reorganized Mississippi's public education system in an attempt to maintain racial segregation. Education funding towards black schools was increased, but still remained inferior to the funding given to white-only schools. In 1951, he opposed attempts by the NAACP to admit black students into white-only colleges and stated that he would "insist on (racial) segregation regardless of the costs or consequences". At the Southern Governors Conference Wright stated that "regardless of what others may say, we in Mississippi are determined that the segregated educational system shall be maintained."

=== 1948 presidential election ===
==== Democratic ====
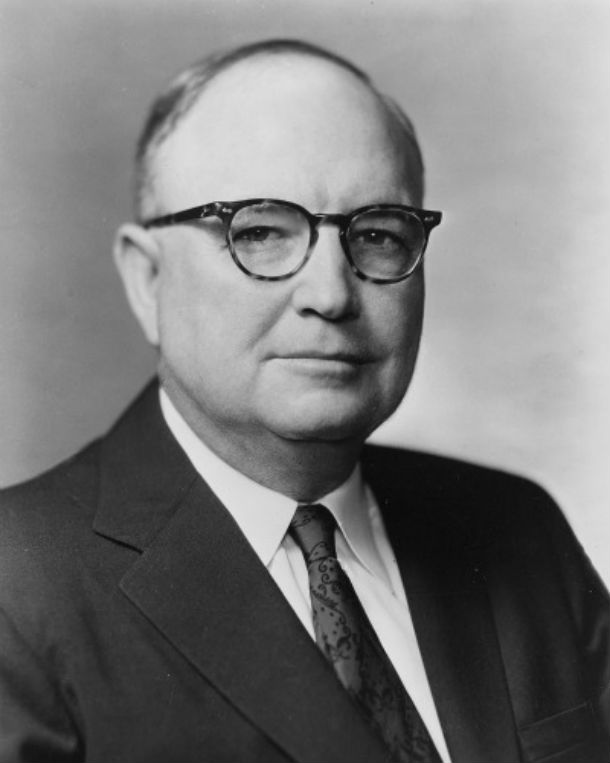
Senator James Eastland was an early supporter of Wright's plan to leave the Democratic Party.

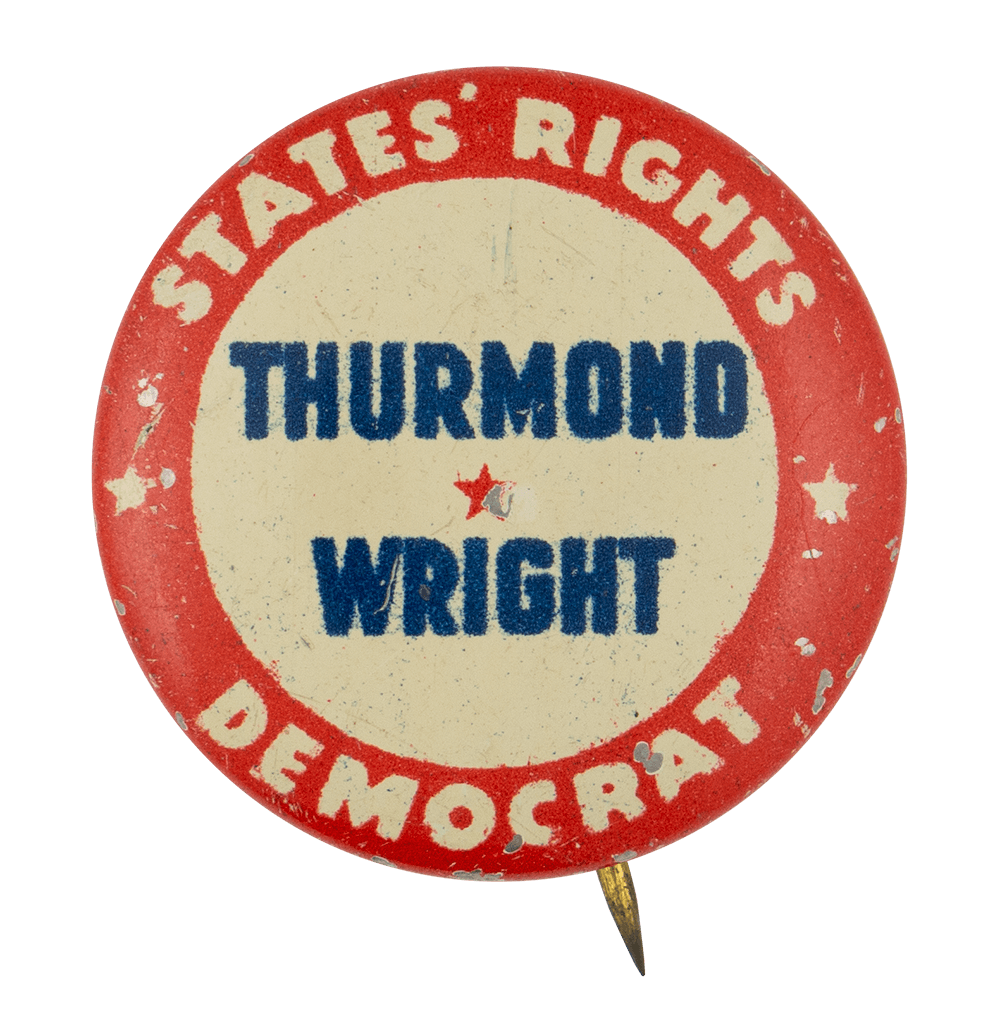
Political button showing support for Strom Thurmond and Fielding L. Wright

Wright's inaugural address calling for Southerners to abandon the Democratic Party was supported by Senator James Eastland, who was later invited to speak before the state legislature. On January 29, 1948, Senator Eastland gave a speech to a joint session of the Mississippi state legislature where he called for the Solid South to withhold its 127 electoral votes from the Democratic presidential nominee so that "a Southern man would emerge as president of the United States".

In February, Wright attended the Southern Governors' Association conference with plans to introduce a resolution calling for the creation of a new Southern party. However, Georgia Governor Melvin E. Thompson gave Wright a copy of a statement condemning his call although Wright stated that he would still introduce his resolution. Alabama Governor Jim Folsom, Maryland Governor William Preston Lane Jr., and Florida Governor Millard Caldwell also criticized Wright while South Carolina Governor Strom Thurmond and Texas Governor Beauford H. Jester declined to comment. When he proposed his resolution it was rejected by the eight other governors present and a different resolution calling for a committee to study the effects of recently proposed civil rights legislation was accepted. Although Wright's resolution was unsuccessful another resolution proposed by Thurmond calling for the Truman administration to stop attacking white supremacy or the Southern Democrats would leave the party.

After his failure at the Southern Governors' Association conference Wright went to Little Rock, Arkansas to meet with political leaders. While there almost four hundred Arkansas political leaders voted unanimously in favor of a resolution supporting Wright and in Virginia Governor William M. Tuck called for the state legislature to prevent Truman from appearing on the ballot. On March 13, another Southern governor meeting was held where a resolution against civil rights and the party's leadership was supported by the governors of South Carolina, Texas, Arkansas, Mississippi, Georgia, Virginia, and Florida while the governors of North Carolina and Louisiana were not at the meeting and the governor of Maryland voted "present".

The Anti-Truman Democratic Club of Florida, which controlled twenty-eight of Florida's delegates to the national convention, formed a presidential draft movement supporting Wright. The organization also passed a resolution where it would support South Carolina Governor Strom Thurmond or Arkansas Governor Benjamin Travis Laney if Wright did not run for the presidency. After being informed of the movement Wright stated that he was not interested in running for president. Former Alabama Governor Frank M. Dixon attempted to start another draft movement for Wright, but Wright declined to run for president again.

On May 10, the States' Rights Democrats conference was held in Jackson, Mississippi, with Wright serving as temporary chairman. The conference was attended by around 2,500 people and a resolution calling for a separate national convention in Birmingham was passed.

On May 25, Wright was elected to serve as one of Sharkey County's eight delegates to Mississippi's state Democratic convention. On June 23, he was selected to serve as one of the delegates to the national convention.

==== Dixiecrat ====
Wright and former Governor Hugh L. White led the twenty-two member Mississippi delegation to the Democratic National Convention. At the national convention he and the Mississippi delegation supported Governor Laney for the presidential nomination. An attempt was made by Charles Hamilton to prevent the seating of the Mississippi delegation due to its pledge to leave the party if Truman was nominated or if the platform was pro-civil rights. However, the Credentials Committee voted fifteen to eleven in favor of seating Wright's delegation.

Results of the 1948 United States presidential election

On July 14, he led the Mississippi delegation in a walkout of the convention to protest the adoption of a pro-civil rights plank into the party's platform. On July 17, the Conference of States' Rights Democrats in Birmingham, Alabama suggested him as a candidate for the vice presidential nomination of the breakaway States' Rights Democratic Party and he later accepted the nomination on August 11.

During the election Wright, a supporter of racial segregation, stated that "if any of you [African Americans] have become so deluded as to want to enter our white schools, patronize our hotels and cafes, enjoy social equality with the whites, then true kindness and sympathy requires me to advise you to make your homes in some other state."

In the general election he and South Carolina Governor Strom Thurmond won the popular and electoral votes of the states of Louisiana, Mississippi, Alabama, and South Carolina, and received one faithless electoral vote from Tennessee. Although the party won multiple states it was unsuccessful in its goal of preventing Truman from winning the election as he still managed to defeat Republican nominee Thomas E. Dewey without the unanimous support of the Solid South.

The failure to spoil the election against Truman was credited to the Dixiecrats being a third party within the United States' two-party system, the Republicans' campaign against Truman in which Dewey did not criticize Truman for his administration's scandals, the Progressive presidential nominee Henry A. Wallace focusing on an idealistic foreign policy, remaining support of the New Deal, labor issues voters against the Taft–Hartley Act, and farm issue voters. In 1950, Truman invited every governor from the South to a luncheon, except for Wright and Thurmond, as Truman stated that invitations were given to Democrats only. Wright continued to defend states' rights and segregation, but conceded that complete obstinance along the lines of the 1948 departure from the Democratic Party would cause Mississippi to lose "its standing with everybody in America."

== Later life ==
Upon leaving gubernatorial office, Wright opened a law practice in Jackson. In 1952, he was selected to serve as Mississippi's national committeeman to the Democratic National Committee for a four-year term. During the 1952 presidential election he supported the Democratic presidential ticket of Governor Adlai Stevenson II and Senator John Sparkman and stated that he would not support the Republican presidential ticket of General Dwight D. Eisenhower and Senator Richard Nixon.

On October 2, 1954, Wright announced that he would seek the Democratic nomination for governor and he selected Gordon Roach, an attorney who had served as Pike County attorney, as his campaign manager. On May 5, 1955, he formally launched his campaign at his home in Rolling Fork with around 3,500 people in attendance. Hoping to build off of white discontent with the United States Supreme Court's 1954 Brown v. Board of Education ruling mandating desegregation in public schools, Wright framed himself as an ardent segregationist. He argued that his involvement in the Dixiecrat foray made him "the man most feared by Negro leaders who seek to integrate the schools" and pledged to use Mississippi's police power to prevent such integration. Though the media reported his chances favorably, Wright placed third in the Democratic primary behind James P. Coleman and Paul B. Johnson Jr., surprising many observers and preventing him from participating in the primary runoff. He thereafter returned to practicing law and Coleman went on to be elected governor.

=== Death and legacy ===
On May 4, 1956, Wright suffered a heart attack and died forty minutes later at his home in Jackson, Mississippi. Following his death, his son Fielding Wright Jr. was selected to succeed him as the president of the United Cerebral Palsy of Mississippi, Incorporated, a cerebral palsy humanitarian organization. His funeral was held on May 6, and was attended by Senator Strom Thurmond, state senator R. M. Kennedy, Mississippi Governor James P. Coleman, Mississippi Lieutenant Governor Carroll Gartin, and Mississippi Secretary of State Heber Ladner. Thurmond stated that his death was "a tremendous loss to the South and to the nation". Most state newspaper obituaries focused on his participation in the 1948 Dixiecrat movement and his staunch segregationist pledges in the 1955 gubernatorial race. He was buried at Kelly Cemetery in Rolling Fork.

On November 17, 1960, a section of U.S. Route 61 inside Mississippi was designated as the Fielding L. Wright Memorial Highway. An art center at the Delta State University and a science complex in the Mississippi Valley State University were named after him.

In 1990, former Arkansas Governor Sid McMath stated that Wright and Thurmond's nominations were "a racist thing" as "they were against Truman because of his attitude toward race and fair employment and these other things that finally became a matter of course later on, this social legislation." Historian James Patterson Smith wrote that Wright's association with the Dixiecrat movement "built the profoundly negative image that has long obscured his substantial achievements as a progressive legislator". His personal papers were destroyed in a fire shortly after he left office, and he has generally been ignored in historiography or dismissed as a reactionary.

== Electoral history ==
Fielding L. Wright electoral history

1943 Mississippi Democratic lieutenant gubernatorial primary runoff
Party	Candidate	Votes	%
Democratic	Fielding L. Wright	155,265	58.83%
Democratic	John Lumpkin	108,661	41.17%
Total votes		263,926	100.00%

1947 Mississippi Democratic gubernatorial primary
Party	Candidate	Votes	%
Democratic	Fielding L. Wright (incumbent)	202,014	55.31%
Democratic	Paul B. Johnson Jr.	112,123	30.70%
Democratic	Jesse M. Byrd	37,997	10.40%
Democratic	Frank L. Jacobs	8,750	2.40%
Democratic	William L. Spinks	4,344	1.19%
Total votes		365,228	100.00%

1947 Mississippi gubernatorial election
Party	Candidate	Votes	%	±%
Democratic	Fielding L. Wright (incumbent)	166,095	97.59%	−2.41%
Independent Republican	George L. Sheldon	4,102	2.41%	+2.41%
Total votes		170,197	100.00%	

1955 Mississippi Democratic gubernatorial primary
Party	Candidate	Votes	%
Democratic	Paul B. Johnson Jr.	122,483	28.07%
Democratic	James P. Coleman	104,140	23.87%
Democratic	Fielding L. Wright	94,460	21.65%
Democratic	Ross Barnett	92,785	21.27%
Democratic	Mary D. Cain	22,469	5.15%
Total votes		436,337	100.00%

== See also ==
- Curtis LeMay – vice-presidential nominee of the American Independent Party in 1968
- Herman Talmadge – selected vice-presidential nominee of a faithless elector in 1956
- Thomas H. Werdel – vice-presidential nominee of multiple third parties in 1956

== Works cited ==
- Sansing, David G. (2016). Mississippi Governors: Soldiers, Statesmen, Scholars, Scoundrels (first ed.). Oxford: Nautilus Publishing Company. ISBN 978-1-936946-81-5.
- Smith, James Patterson (2019). "Fielding L. Wright (1946-1952): Legacy of a White-Supremacist Progressive" (PDF). The Journal of Mississippi History. LXXXI (1–2): 61–80. ISSN 0022-2771.

Political offices
Preceded by Dennis Murphree	Lieutenant Governor of Mississippi; 1944–1946	Succeeded by Sam Lumpkin
Preceded by Thomas L. Bailey	Governor of Mississippi; 1946–1952	Succeeded by Hugh L. White
Party political offices
Preceded by Dennis Murphree	Democratic nominee for Lieutenant Governor of Mississippi; 1943	Succeeded by Sam Lumpkin
Preceded by Thomas L. Bailey	Democratic nominee for Governor of Mississippi; 1947	Succeeded by Hugh L. White
New political party	Dixiecrat nominee for Vice President of the United States; 1948	Party dissolved
