= Carroll Gartin =

American politician (1913–1966)

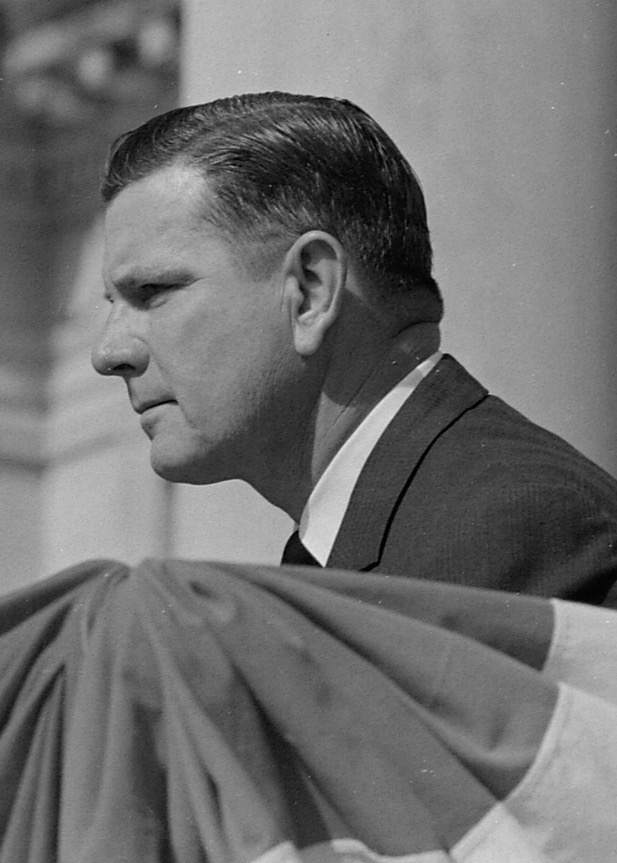
- Gartin at the inauguration of Paul B. Johnson Jr. in 1964

22nd Lieutenant Governor of Mississippi
- In office January 22, 1952– January 19, 1960
- Governor: Hugh L. White
- Preceded by: Sam Lumpkin
- Succeeded by: Paul B. Johnson Jr.
- In office January 21, 1964 – December 19, 1966
- Governor: James P. Coleman
- Preceded by: Paul B. Johnson Jr.
- Succeeded by: Charles L. Sullivan

Personal details
- Born: William Carroll Gartin; September 14, 1913 Meridian, Mississippi, U.S.
- Died: December 19, 1966 (aged 53) Laurel, Mississippi, U.S.
- Party: Democratic
- Spouse: Janie Gavin
- Profession: Attorney

William Carroll Gartin (September 14, 1913 – December 19, 1966) was an American Democratic politician from Laurel in Jones County in southeastern Mississippi, who served three terms as the 22nd lieutenant governor of his state.

== Early life ==
William Carroll Gartin was born on September 14, 1913 in Poplar Springs, Meridian, in eastern Mississippi. He was the youngest of six children of Charles Gartin, a furniture salesman, and Geneva Jackson. Carroll was drawn to politics at an early age. He attended the 1924 gubernatorial election rallies in Meridian. Gartin attended the public schools of Meridian. He was a self-proclaimed "pretty ordinary" high school student, neither a varsity athlete nor a class officer, who instead worked in a saw mill after school. He graduated from high school soon after the Great Depression began. His family did not have enough money to pay for college, so Gartin had to work to pay for it himself. He first attended Jones County Junior College, living at his aunt and uncle's dairy farm the first year. He spent the following summer working at a drugstore and then spent his second year there also working as a janitor so he could live in the dormitories. He then similarly worked his way through Millsaps College. In 1933 and 1934 he lived with his parents in Jackson, where he attended Jackson Law School. The next year he graduated from the University of Mississippi School of Law. In July 1936, Gartin was admitted to the bar and then moved to Laurel, Mississippi.

== Political career ==
=== 1936-1950, Laurel ===
Shortly after moving to Laurel, Gartin was appointed to the office of city judge in an acting capacity. In 1939, Gartin ran for county attorney, where he lost to Paul G. Swartzfagar. In 1941, Gartin enlisted in the United States Army, where he was first sent to Fort Barrancas and then Fort Lee. In late 1943, he was sent overseas, where he served until being discharged in 1946.

On July 22, 1946, Laurel mayor J. C. Miller resigned in the middle of his second term to resume his former job of working with the railway. An election was called for August 19, 1946, to fill the vacancy. Gartin was the only candidate for the election, which he then won by default. He similarly won re-election in 1948.

=== 1951-1966 ===
In 1951, Gartin was a candidate for Lieutenant Governor of Mississippi. His opponents in the first Democratic primary on August 7 were Grady Cook, Jimmy Arrington, Hayden Campbell, Charles G. Hamilton, and Lee V. Prisock. He won the plurality of votes in the first primary. In the second primary against Arrington (mayor of Collins), Gartin won, receiving 247,458 votes to Arrington's 137,449. He was unopposed in the general election. He served his first two terms from 1952 to 1960 under fellow Democrats, Governors Hugh L. White and James P. Coleman. In 1954, Gartin ran for U. S. Senator, but lost the Democratic primary to James Eastland. Eastland received 137,836 votes, while Gartin received 83,761 votes.

Gartin ran for re-election as lieutenant governor in 1955. He defeated state senator J. O. Clark and Circuit Court judge Sebe Dale with a majority vote in the first Democratic primary, and was once again unopposed in the general election.

Gartin was a delegate to the 1956 Democratic National Convention, which nominated the Stevenson-Kefauver ticket.

In 1957, as lieutenant governor, Gartin wrote a letter to Arkansas governor Orval Faubus "expressing admiration and support" for Faubus's refusal to obey the federal government during the Little Rock Integration Crisis.

He returned to the office for two years under Paul B. Johnson Jr. but died midway in his term. In the 1963 campaign, Gartin accused Johnson's opponent, the Republican nominee Rubel Phillips of Corinth and Jackson, of having created an unnecessary general election, a scenario that was new to Mississippi. Gartin said that Phillips, as a former Democrat, could have simply ran in the Democratic primary and thus voided the need for a third election.

Johnson's campaign was buoyed by outgoing Governor Ross Barnett and Democratic State Chairman Bidwell Adam. Johnson topped Phillips, 62%-38%, and Gartin defeated the Republican candidate for lieutenant governor, Stanford Morse, a state senator from Gulfport by an even larger 74%-26%.

Gartin was a staunch white supremacist and a former supporter of Governor and US Senator Theodore G. Bilbo. He was a member of the Mississippi State Sovereignty Commission, which was devoted to preserving racial segregation in the state.

Gartin died of a heart attack in 1966 at Jones County Community Hospital, hours after he had checked in for chest pains.

The Carroll Gartin Justice Building (32°18′19″N 90°10′56″W), in the state capital, Jackson, is named after him and houses the Mississippi Supreme Court, the Mississippi Court of Appeals, and the state law library.

Gartin, an attorney, practiced law with Republican Charles W. Pickering.

== Personal life ==
Gartin married Janie Elizabeth Gavin in 1942, and they had two children.

Party political offices
| Preceded by Sam Lumpkin | Democratic nominee for Lieutenant Governor of Mississippi; 1951, 1955 | Succeeded by Paul B. Johnson Jr. |
| Preceded by Paul B. Johnson Jr. | Democratic nominee for Lieutenant Governor of Mississippi; 1963 | Succeeded by Charles L. Sullivan |
Political offices
| Preceded by Sam Lumpkin | Lieutenant Governor of Mississippi; 1952–1960 | Succeeded by Paul B. Johnson Jr. |
| Preceded by Paul B. Johnson Jr. | Lieutenant Governor of Mississippi; 1964–1966 | Succeeded by Charles L. Sullivan |
