= 1955 Mississippi gubernatorial election =

1955 Mississippi Democratic gubernatorial primary runoff
- November 8, 1955
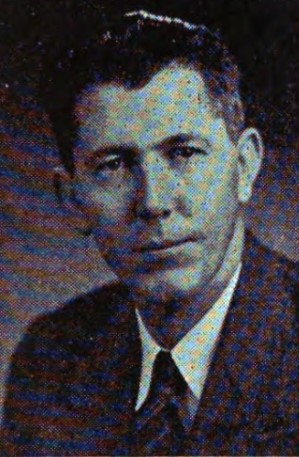

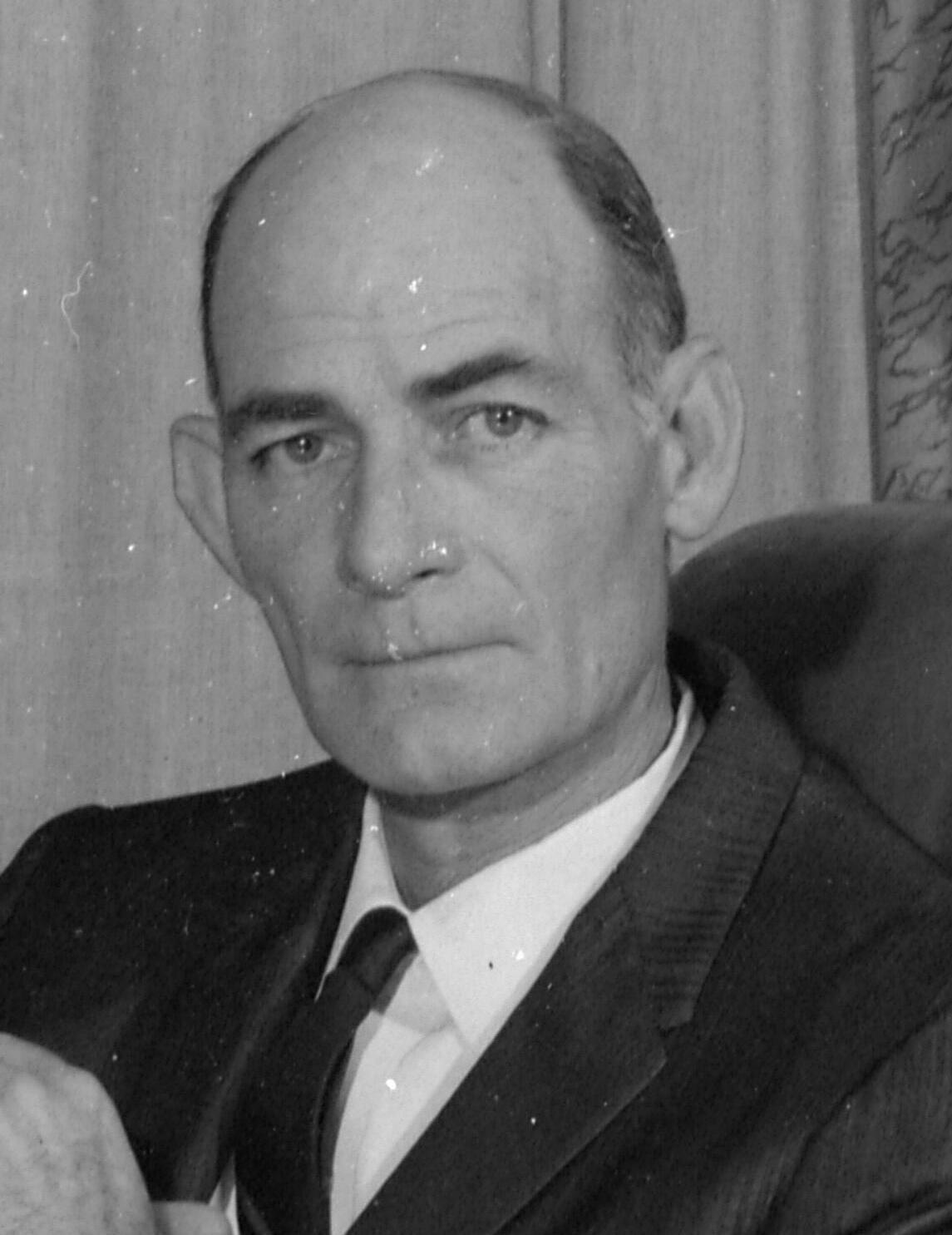
Nominee	James P. Coleman	Paul B. Johnson Jr.
Party	Democratic	Democratic
Popular vote	233,237	185,924
Percentage	55.64%	44.36%
- County results Coleman: 50–60% 60–70% 70–80% 80–90% Johnson: 50–60% 60–70% 70–80%
Governor before election
Hugh L. White
Democratic
Elected Governor
James P. Coleman
Democratic

The 1955 Mississippi gubernatorial election took place on November 8, 1955, in order to elect the Governor of Mississippi. Incumbent Democrat Hugh L. White was term-limited, and could not run for reelection to a second term. As was common at the time, the Democratic candidate ran unopposed in the general election, so therefore the Democratic primary was the real contest, and winning the primary was considered tantamount to election. This election was the first Mississippi gubernatorial election since 1931 that the winner of the gubernatorial election was of a different party than the incumbent president.

== Democratic primary ==
No candidate received a majority in the Democratic primary, which featured five contenders, so a runoff was held between the top two candidates. The runoff election was won by Attorney General James P. Coleman, who defeated lawyer Paul B. Johnson Jr., son of former Governor Paul B. Johnson Sr.

=== Results ===
Mississippi Democratic gubernatorial primary, 1955
Party	Candidate	Votes	%
Democratic	Paul B. Johnson Jr.	122,423	28.06
Democratic	James P. Coleman	104,140	23.87
Democratic	Fielding L. Wright	94,410	21.64
Democratic	Ross Barnett	92,785	21.27
Democratic	Mary D. Cain	22,469	5.15
Total votes		436,227	100.00

=== Runoff ===
Mississippi Democratic gubernatorial primary runoff, 1955
Party	Candidate	Votes	%
Democratic	James P. Coleman	233,237	55.64
Democratic	Paul B. Johnson Jr.	185,924	44.36
Total votes		419,161	100.00

== General election ==
In the general election, Coleman ran unopposed.

=== Results ===
Mississippi gubernatorial election, 1955
Party	Candidate	Votes	%
Democratic	James P. Coleman	40,707	100.00
Total votes		40,707	100.00
Democratic hold			
