= Rubel Phillips =

American politician (1925–2011)

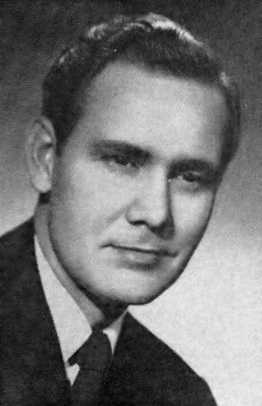
- Phillips in 1957

Member of the Mississippi Public Service Commission from the Northern District
- In office January 16, 1956 – January 1, 1958
- Preceded by: Howard H. Little
- Succeeded by: Thomas Hal Phillips

Personal details
- Born: Rubel Lex Phillips; March 29, 1925 Alcorn County, Mississippi, U.S.
- Died: June 18, 2011 (aged 86) Ridgeland, Mississippi, U.S.
- Party: Democratic (until 1962); Republican (from 1962)
- Spouse: Margaret James (m. 1955)
- Relations: Thomas Hal Phillips (brother)
- Children: 2

Military service
- Branch/service: United States Navy
- Years of service: 1943–1963
- Rank: Commander

Rubel Lex Phillips (March 29, 1925 – June 18, 2011) was an American politician and lawyer. He grew up poor in Alcorn County, Mississippi, and graduated from the University of Mississippi School of Law. Hailing from a politically active family and initially a member of the Democratic Party, he served as a circuit court clerk from 1952 to 1956 and chaired the Mississippi Public Service Commission from 1956 to 1958. In 1962 Phillips joined the Republican Party. He ran as a Republican in the 1963 Mississippi gubernatorial election, the first person to do so since 1947. Supporting a platform of racial segregation and opposition to the presidential administration of John F. Kennedy, he lost, garnering only 38 percent of the vote.

Phillips ran as a Republican a second time during the 1967 Mississippi gubernatorial election with a more racially moderate approach, losing after getting only 30 percent of the vote. He never ran for office again but continued to fundraise for Republican candidates throughout the rest of his life. He thereafter became an executive at the Stirling Homex Corporation, but was incarcerated and disbarred after becoming involved in a scheme to inflate profit figures to investors and regulators. Reinstated to the bar in 1982, he resumed legal practice and worked as a consultant and counsel for a telephone company. He died at an assisted living facility in Ridgeland, Mississippi, in 2011.

== Early life ==
Rubel Lex Phillips was born on March 29, 1925, in Alcorn County, Mississippi, to William T. Phillips and Ollie Fare Phillips. He had four brothers, including future writer Thomas Hal Phillips. The family grew up poor, and in the 1940s they moved to Kossuth. Rubel Phillips graduated from Alcorn Agricultural High School in 1943 and enlisted in the United States Navy. He served for four years, including duty in the Pacific Theater of World War II, and retained an officer's commission in the force until he retired from the navy with the rank of commander in 1963. He graduated from Millsaps College and the University of Mississippi School of Law. In 1955, he married Margaret James in Drew and subsequently had two sons with her.

== Political career ==
=== Early career ===
Hailing from a politically active family and initially a member of the Democratic Party, Phillips was elected circuit court clerk for Alcorn County, serving from 1952 until 1956. He was elected to the Mississippi Public Service Commission in 1955 as its northern district member. He succeeded Howard H. Little, who unsuccessfully ran against Nellah Massey Bailey for State Tax Collector rather than seek reelection. The two other members of the commission decided to name Phillips as the body's chairman upon their assumption of office. He and the rest of the commission were sworn in on January 16, 1956. During his tenure the commission's regulatory authority was strengthened and it successfully litigated the Southern Bell Telephone and Telegraph Company to lower its rates for Mississippi customers. He announced his resignation from the Public Service Commission on December 20, 1957, to join a law firm in Jackson. Governor J. P. Coleman appointed his brother, Thomas, to succeed him on the commission. His resignation went into effect on January 1, 1958. In 1959 he worked on a campaign advisory committee for Ross Barnett.

=== Party switch and 1963 gubernatorial campaign ===
Phillips opposed the nomination of John F. Kennedy as the Democratic U.S. presidential candidate in 1960 and voted for the slate of unpledged electors during the general election. In late 1962 he began consulting Wirt Yerger Jr. on the possibility of him running for the office of governor of Mississippi with the backing of the Mississippi Republican Party, which Yerger chaired. After several weeks of public speculation, on December 20, Phillips formally announced his decision to run as a Republican in the 1963 Mississippi gubernatorial election, making him the first Republican gubernatorial candidate in Mississippi since George L. Sheldon ran in 1947. He justified his switch in party affiliation by arguing that the Republican Party offered Mississippi "a program of genuine conservatism and local responsibility" and accusing the "National Democratic Party" of promoting socialism. Political columnist Bill Minor said of his party switch, "I really believe he converted to Republicanism as a political opportunity to raise money to run. I never saw him as adopting the philosophy."

Like his Democratic opponent, Paul B. Johnson Jr., Phillips' campaign was dominated by appeals to white supremacy and race-baiting, arguing that Republicans were better suited to protect Jim Crow racial segregation in the state than Democrats. He declared in one campaign appearance, "I was born a segregationist, I am for segregation now, and I will be for segregation when I die." He attempted to link Johnson with President Kennedy, using the campaign slogan "K.O. the Kennedys", and stated that he would help U.S. Senator Barry Goldwater get elected president in 1964. He also stated that a strong two-party system in the state would "undermine the Negro" as "Negroes are all Democrats." Johnson characterized Phillips as a covert racial moderate who had switched parties because he had little chance of winning a large Democratic primary, and his campaign publicized a memo Phillips had written as a public service commissioner in 1956 calling for a moderate approach to racial issues. He and major state newspapers decried the threat posed by a two-party system to the political unity of white conservatives, warning that it would create an opening for black voters to gain influence. Phillips also backed education reform, civil service reform, and right-to-work legislation. He opposed sales tax increases. He lost the election, garnering only 38 percent of the vote. Despite concluding that Republicans had "lost a battle," he argued that "we have not lost the war. We now know that we have a strong two-party system."

=== 1967 gubernatorial campaign ===
Eager to continue to build up the Republican Party in Mississippi, state Republican chairman Clarke Reed and finance director Billy Mounger convinced Phillips to run again in the 1967 Mississippi gubernatorial election. Encouraged by the good performance of moderate Republicans in the South during the 1966 United States elections, Phillips decided to run as a moderate against segregationist Democrat John Bell Williams. He opened his campaign on October 3 with a television broadcast, calling for a "two-way street in human relations" and advising that "The white cannot keep the Negro down without paying the awesome penalty of restricting his own advancement." The declaration marked a break from previous Republican messaging in the state and garnered skepticism from political observers. When asked whether his comments had doomed his chances, Phillips stated, "I think the people of Mississippi are ready to face this issue. I think it is a timely subject." He also alleged that the state was controlled by an "old guard establishment" who were interested in perpetuating their own power at the expense of the state's economy.

Phillips backed the reinstatement of compulsory school attendance legislation, the disbanding of the Mississippi Milk Commission and the repeal of the two-year residency requirement for prospective voters in the state. He also supported a freeze on state government hiring, which Williams rejected, arguing it would deny employment opportunities to young people. Phillips was endorsed by the black-dominated and civil rights-oriented Mississippi Freedom Democratic Party, which praised his call to improve the state's race relations and reduce the restriction of black economic advancement. He denounced their support as a "kiss of death type endorsement". He lost overwhelmingly to Williams, only garnering 30 percent of the vote, much of it coming from black voters registered in wake of the passage of the Voting Rights Act of 1965. He never ran for office again but continued to fundraise for Republican candidates throughout the rest of his life.

== Later life ==
Following his second failed gubernatorial bid, Phillips became an executive for the Stirling Homex Corporation, a New York-based company that built housing modules. The firm went bankrupt in 1972, and Phillips and four other executives were indicted for conspiracy and the fraudulent sale of stock. Phillips and three others were convicted of inflating profits to deceive investors, auditors, and the U.S. Securities and Exchange Commission. He was sentenced to pay a $5,000 fine (equivalent to $25,000 in 2025) and 10 months of incarceration. The defendants appealed their case to the U.S. Supreme Court, which declined to hear their case in 1978. Two years later the Mississippi Supreme Court disbarred Phillips. He successfully sought reinstatement to the bar in September 1982 and resumed practicing law in Jackson. From 1979 to 1990 he worked as a consultant and retained counsel for Mobile Communications Corporation of America. He died on June 18, 2011, at an assisted living facility in Ridgeland, Mississippi. Historian Billy Burton Hathorn reflected that Phillips' "two campaigns breathed new life in a previously moribund party [...] Phillips spearheaded a gradual change in the political climate of his native state so that in the future it would be the general election, not the second Democratic primary, which became the principal focus of attention."

== Works cited ==
- Crespino, Joseph (2021). In Search of Another Country: Mississippi and the Conservative Counterrevolution (reprint ed.). Princeton University Press. ISBN 9781400832712.
- Hathorn, Billy Burton (November 1985). "Challenging the Status Quo: Rubel Lex Phillips and the Mississippi Republican Party (1963–1967)". The Journal of Mississippi History. XLVII (4): 240–265.
- Krane, Dale; Shaffer, Stephen D. (1992). Mississippi Government and Politics: Modernizers Versus Traditionalists. University of Nebraska Press. ISBN 9780803277588.
- Nash, Jere; Taggart, Andy (2009). Mississippi Politics: The Struggle for Power, 1976-2008 (second ed.). University Press of Mississippi. ISBN 9781604733570.
- Stuart, Jan (2003). The Nashville Chronicles: The Making of Robert Altman's Masterpiece. Hal Leonard Corporation. ISBN 9780879109813.

Party political offices
Vacant Title last held by George L. Sheldon	Republican nominee for Governor of Mississippi; 1963, 1967	Vacant Title next held by Gil Carmichael
