= 1943 Mississippi lieutenant gubernatorial election =

1943 Mississippi Democratic lieutenant gubernatorial primary runoff
- August 24, 1943
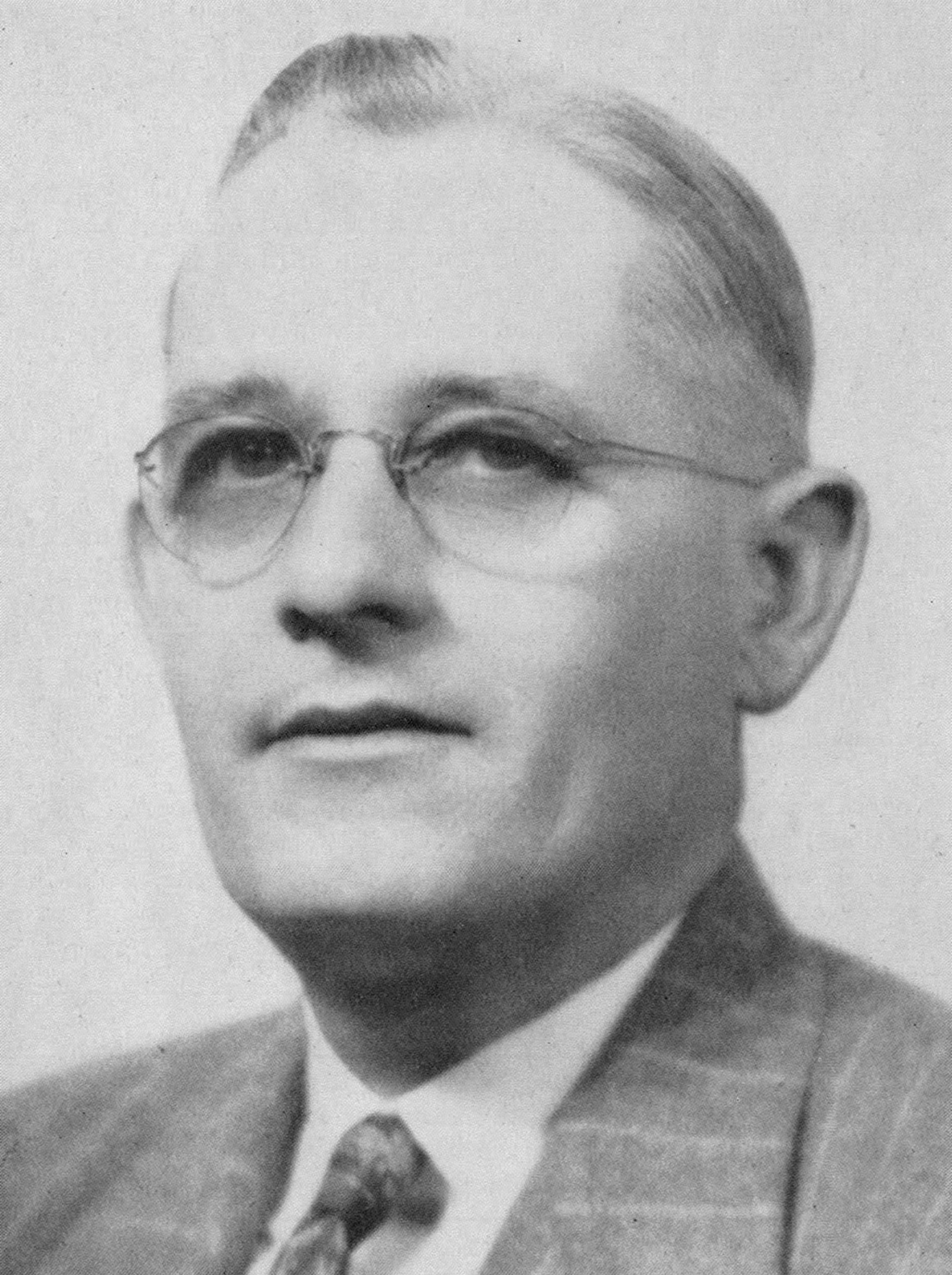

Candidate	Fielding L. Wright	John Lumpkin
Party	Democratic	Democratic
Popular vote	153,265	108,661
Percentage	58.51%	41.49%
- County results Wright: 50–60% 60–70% 70–80% 80–90% 90–100% Lumpkin: 50–60% 60–70% 70–80% 80–90%
Lieutenant governor before election
Dennis Murphree
Democratic
Elected Lieutenant governor
Fielding L. Wright
Democratic

The 1943 Mississippi lieutenant gubernatorial election took place on November 2, 1943, in order to elect the Lieutenant Governor of Mississippi. Incumbent Democrat Dennis Murphree decided to run for governor instead of seeking another term.

As was common at the time, the Democratic candidate ran unopposed in the general election; therefore, the Democratic primary was the real contest, and winning the primary was considered tantamount to election.

== Democratic primary ==
No candidate received a majority in the Democratic primary, which featured four contenders, so a runoff was held between the top two candidates. The runoff election was won by Fielding L. Wright, who defeated John Lumpkin.

=== Results ===
August 3, 1943 Democratic primary
Party	Candidate	Votes	%
Democratic	Fielding L. Wright	91,182	33.73%
Democratic	John Lumpkin	75,352	27.87%
Democratic	Paul Spearman	61,000	22.56%
Democratic	Charles G. Hamilton	42,814	15.84%
Total votes		270,348	100.00%

=== Runoff ===
August 24, 1943 Democratic primary runoff
Party	Candidate	Votes	%
Democratic	Fielding L. Wright	153,265	58.51%
Democratic	John Lumpkin	108,661	41.49%
Total votes		261,926	100.00%

== General election ==
In the general election, Wright won unopposed.

=== Results ===
November 2, 1943 General Election
Party	Candidate	Votes	%
Democratic	Fielding L. Wright	48,988	100.00%
Total votes		48,988	100.00%
