= Paul B. Johnson Jr. =

American attorney and politician (1916–1985)

Paul Johnson
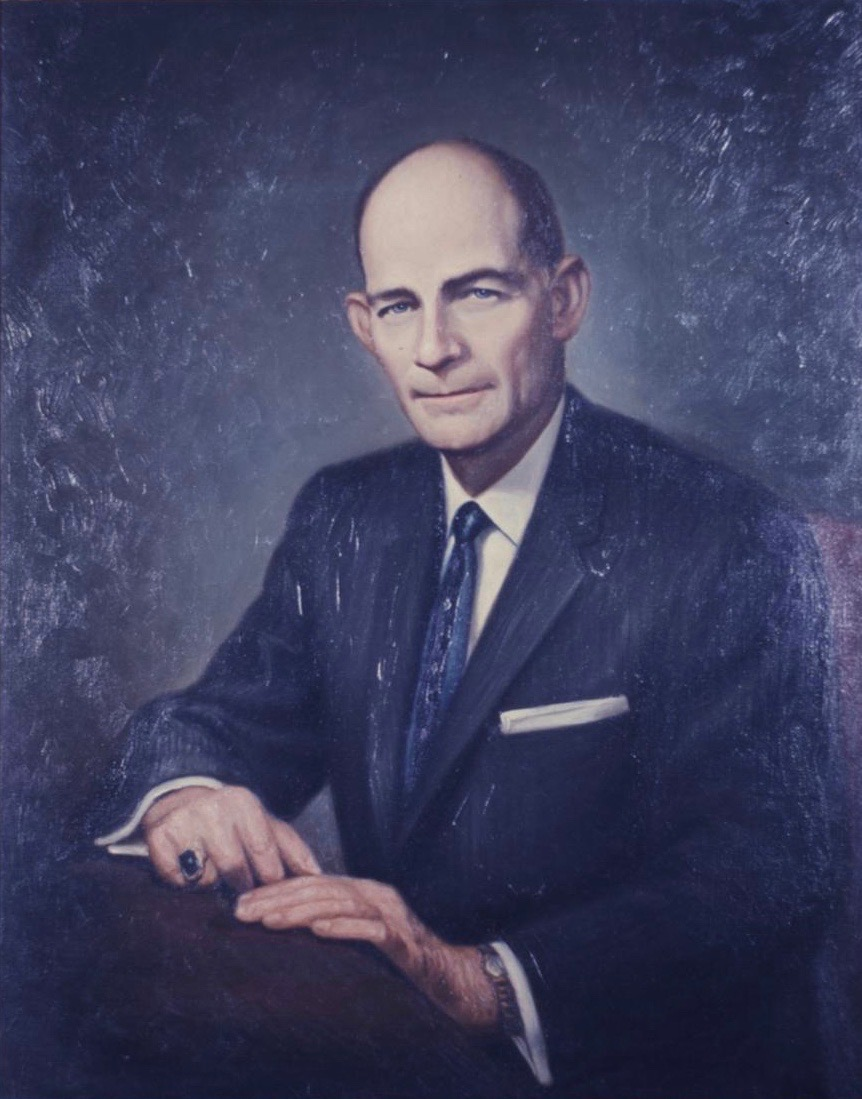

54th Governor of Mississippi
- In office January 21, 1964 – January 16, 1968
- Lieutenant: Carroll Gartin
- Preceded by: Ross Barnett
- Succeeded by: John Bell Williams

23rd Lieutenant Governor of Mississippi
- In office January 19, 1960 – January 21, 1964
- Governor: Ross R. Barnett
- Preceded by: Carroll Gartin
- Succeeded by: Carroll Gartin

Personal details
- Born: Paul Burney Johnson Jr. January 23, 1916 Hattiesburg, Mississippi, U.S.
- Died: October 14, 1985 (aged 69) Hattiesburg, Mississippi, U.S.
- Party: Democratic
- Spouse: Dorothy Power
- Relations: Pete Johnson (nephew)
- Children: 1 daughter, 2 sons
- Parent: Paul B. Johnson Sr. (father) Corinne Venable (mother)
- Education: University of Mississippi

Military service
- Allegiance: United States
- Branch/service: United States Marine Corps
- Battles/wars: World War II • South Pacific

Paul Burney Johnson Jr. (January 23, 1916 – October 14, 1985) was an American attorney and Democratic politician from Mississippi, serving as the 54th Governor of Mississippi from January 1964 until January 1968. He was a son of former Mississippi Governor Paul B. Johnson Sr.

== Early life and education ==
Paul B. Johnson Jr. grew up in a political family, as his father was a notable Democratic Party leader, serving as US Congressman from 1919 to 1923. The younger Johnson had an affectionate reverence for Franklin D. Roosevelt based on the days of his Congressman father's friendship with the then-Assistant Secretary of the Navy (the families' children knew each other). In 1939, Johnson Sr. was elected as Governor of Mississippi, dying in office in 1943.

Johnson attended local schools, which were segregated under Jim Crow laws. He graduated from the University of Mississippi, where he met his college sweetheart Dorothy Power. During his first year at Ole Miss, he was a member of the freshman Ole Miss football team and was initiated into Sigma Alpha Epsilon social fraternity. He had the distinction of being the only sophomore ever elected as president of the Ole Miss student body. He also graduated from Ole Miss Law and passed the bar exam.

== Early career and military service ==
Johnson became a practicing attorney in Jackson and Hattiesburg. After beginning his career, he married Dorothy Power in 1941. They had 4 children.

In 1917, Johnson stood as a candidate for Congress; doing so on a progressive platform.

During World War II, Johnson served in the South Pacific with the United States Marine Corps. Upon his release from the service, Johnson wanted to enter politics. He gained an appointment as the Assistant U.S. Attorney for the Southern District of Mississippi from 1948 to 1951.

As described by writer Theodore White, Johnson had, for a Southerner, a liberal early record. He supported Harry S. Truman for president in 1948 (Truman received just over ten percent of the vote in Mississippi), Adlai Stevenson in 1952. Johnson ran for governor three times: in 1947, 1951, and 1955, but was unsuccessful. In 1947, prior to his first try for the governor's mansion, he also ran for an open U.S. Senate seat, but lost.

In 1951, when Johnson ran for governor of Mississippi, Percy Greene, a black newspaper editor publicly supported the Johnson ticket and rallied black voters to support him; this angered white voters who rallied to Johnson's opponent. When Johnson narrowly lost the election he blamed Percy Greene and said Greene gave him the "kiss of death".

In 1959, Johnson ran for lieutenant governor and won, serving under Governor Ross Barnett, who became a segregationist icon. Johnson played a prominent role in trying to prevent James Meredith from enrolling at Ole Miss in 1962, physically blocking (for the benefit of photographers) the federal marshals who were escorting the African-American veteran.

Then Lt. Governor Johnson (right) with President William David McCain (left) of the Mississippi Southern College and Gov. Ross Barnett at signing of the bill granting the college university status in 1962

Although Johnson felt that state politics were ill-suited for him, he ran for governor again in 1963. He defeated former governor James P. Coleman by tying his opponent to President John F. Kennedy's civil rights legislation proposed that year. During the campaign, he asked voters to "Stand tall with Paul" against those wanting to change Mississippi's "way of life", in reference to his confrontation with federal marshals at Ole Miss.

In the general election, Johnson faced Rubel Phillips, originally from Corinth. He was the first strong Republican candidate for Mississippi governor since the end of Reconstruction in 1876, as the party was hobbled after the state passed a disfranchising constitution in 1890, effectively barring most blacks from the political system. In the 1960s, however, in contrast to Reconstruction, the Republican Party was appealing to white conservatives in the South.

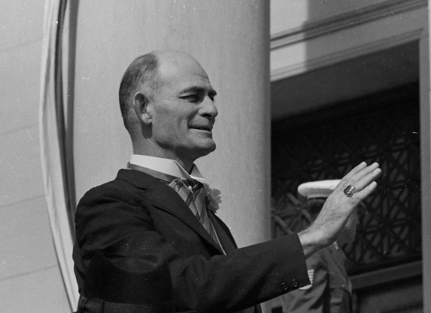
Johnson at his 1964 inauguration

Phillips, a recent Democratic state Public Service Commissioner, ran under the slogan "K.O. (knock out) the Kennedys", and tried to tie Barnett and Johnson to the national Democrats. Phillips worked to convince voters that he and GOP lieutenant governor candidate Stanford Morse, a state senator from Gulfport, represented the best hope for preserving Mississippi's traditional "way of life", while at the same time making overall progress.

== Governor of Mississippi ==
In historian Theodore H. White's initial description of Johnson, he wrote:

this was no Northern cartoon of a Mississippi Governor; this was a man of civilization and dignity whose deep, serious voice spoke not cornpone but a cultured English—and spoke at once in fear, perplexity, and wistfulness. In his plight one could see half the tragedy of his state.

In his inaugural address in 1964, Johnson chose the "Pursuit of Excellence" as his term's theme and said, "Hate, or prejudice, or ignorance, will not lead Mississippi while I sit in the governor's chair." To many, that comment had a hollow ring five months later, when during the investigation of the murders of Chaney, Goodman, and Schwerner in June 1964, Johnson offered little or no help. He praised Neshoba County Sheriff Lawrence A. Rainey and deputy sheriff Cecil Price. He also dismissed fears that the trio had been murdered, saying "Maybe they went to Cuba," a reference to the country's communist regime; opponents of the civil rights movement often suggested the movement was a communist plot.

James W. Silver, a history professor at Ole Miss, published a book condemning Mississippi's segregated society; it became a bestseller and he had to leave the state. He wrote of the governor:

Probably satisfying no one, Johnson kept his own counsel, and his mouth closed to demagogic outbursts, while treading the uneasy path between the demands of the Citizens Council (which had helped elect him) and the imperatives of the situation. As one astute observer saw it, the governor was "tempering political expedience with common sense, yet still attempting to ease down the more radical, emotional, ignorant groups without losing those votes." And so "ambivalent Paul" could denounce in picturesque and biting language the impending civil rights law and could declare that "It is an odd thing that so much hell is being raised over three people missing in Mississippi when 10,000 are missing in New York."

At the same time, he officially welcomed federal officials, Allen Dulles and J. Edgar Hoover, to Mississippi for the investigation. He fired several members of the Ku Klux Klan from the Highway Patrol. He criticized civil rights workers and refused to meet with major African American leaders, but supported law enforcement and ending violence in Pike County. Historians believe that:

the two Johnsons, President and Governor, likely kept each other informed, though neither could have admitted that to his public ... In the meantime, the old "watchdog of segregation", the State Sovereignty Commission, lapsed into desuetude from deliberate withholding of gubernatorial appointments, and the Citizens Council prepared its own death watch.

After recognizing the potentially damaging effects of racism on the state's image and business climate, particularly in terms of attracting investment and new businesses, Johnson worked to tone down racist rhetoric. He adopted moderate policies, and asked residents to comply with the newly passed Voting Rights Act in 1965. He declared: "The day for a lot of bull-shooting is over." His leadership was believed to have contributed to the decrease in racial violence in the state and to its solid economic growth. Johnson worked hard to pass a $130 million bond issue to finance a major expansion of the Ingalls Shipyard in Pascagoula. Like many other southern governors, Johnson quietly observed the 1965 Civil War centennial of the defeat of the Confederacy. In addition, his 1966 fight to repeal the prohibition on alcohol, a state law which for 48 years had been largely ignored by moonshiners, was another issue that gained him popular appeal. Johnson left politics following the end of his term.

He suffered a stroke in the late 1970s, and continued to struggle with his health in his final years. He suffered a fatal heart attack in 1985 at his home in Hattiesburg, and died surrounded by wife and family.

Party political offices
Preceded by Carroll Gartin	Democratic nominee for Lieutenant Governor of Mississippi; 1959	Succeeded by Carroll Gartin
Preceded by Ross Barnett	Democratic nominee for Governor of Mississippi; 1963	Succeeded by John Bell Williams
Political offices
Preceded by Ross R. Barnett	Governor of Mississippi; January 21, 1964 – January 16, 1968	Succeeded by John Bell Williams
