= James P. Coleman =

American judge (1914–1991)

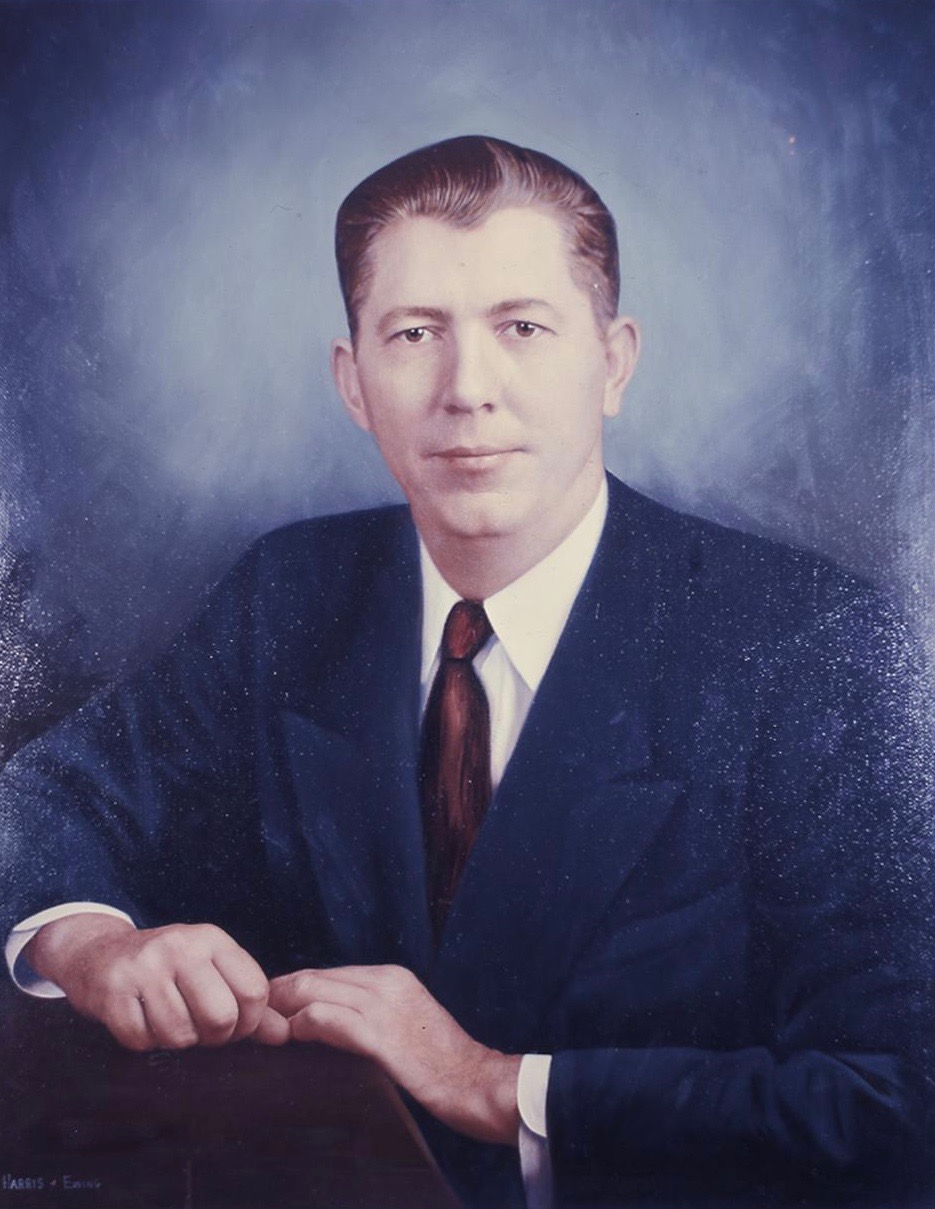

Senior Judge of the United States Court of Appeals for the Fifth Circuit
- In office May 31, 1981 – January 31, 1984

Chief Judge of the United States Court of Appeals for the Fifth Circuit
- In office 1979–1981
- Preceded by: John Robert Brown
- Succeeded by: John Cooper Godbold

Judge of the United States Court of Appeals for the Fifth Circuit
- In office July 26, 1965 – May 31, 1981
- Appointed by: Lyndon B. Johnson
- Preceded by: Benjamin Franklin Cameron
- Succeeded by: E. Grady Jolly

52nd Governor of Mississippi
- In office January 17, 1956 – January 19, 1960
- Lieutenant: Carroll Gartin
- Preceded by: Hugh L. White
- Succeeded by: Ross Barnett

33rd Mississippi Attorney General
- In office February 21, 1950 – January 17, 1956
- Governor: Fielding L. Wright; Hugh L. White
- Preceded by: Greek L. Rice
- Succeeded by: Joseph Turner Patterson

Personal details
- Born: James Plemon Coleman; January 9, 1914 Ackerman, Mississippi, U.S.
- Died: September 28, 1991 (aged 77) Ackerman, Mississippi, U.S.
- Party: Democratic
- Children: 1
- Education: George Washington University Law School (LLB)

James Plemon Coleman (January 9, 1914 – September 28, 1991) was an American judge, the 52nd governor of Mississippi, and a United States circuit judge of the United States Court of Appeals for the Fifth Circuit. Coleman was a member of the Democratic Party and was the first Mississippi governor born in the 20th century.

== Education and career ==
James Plemon Coleman was born on January 9, 1914, in Ackerman, Mississippi. He was the son of Thomas Allen Coleman and Jennie Essie (Worrell) Coleman. He graduated from the University of Mississippi and paid for his tuition by working. In 1935, he served on the staff of Mississippi Congressman Aaron L. Ford. Coleman received a Bachelor of Laws in 1939 from the George Washington University Law School. He entered private practice in Ackerman from 1939 to 1946. He concurrently served as district attorney for the Fifth Judicial District of Mississippi from 1940 to 1946. He was a Judge of the Mississippi Circuit Court for the Fifth Judicial District from 1947 to 1950. He was a justice of the Mississippi Supreme Court in 1950. He was Mississippi Attorney General from 1950 to 1956. He was the 52nd Governor of Mississippi from 1956 to 1960. He was a Member of the Mississippi House of Representatives from 1960 to 1964. He was in private practice in Choctaw County, Mississippi from 1960 to 1965.

=== Little Congress ===
During his service with Congressman Ford, in Washington, D.C., Coleman made a name for himself by challenging and defeating another young southern congressional staffer, future President Lyndon B. Johnson, for Speaker of the Little Congress, a body that Johnson had dominated before Coleman's challenge. Coleman and Johnson became lifelong friends.

== Gubernatorial service ==
Coleman became the Governor of Mississippi in 1956 as a moderate candidate in a campaign where he promised to uphold segregation. As Governor, he befriended Democratic presidential candidate, Senator John F. Kennedy, but set up the Mississippi State Sovereignty Commission. When Clennon Washington King, Jr. attempted to integrate the University of Mississippi, Coleman went to Oxford to prevent King's matriculation and fulfill his promise of segregation of all schools. He objected to being called a moderate by his critics, preferring to characterize himself as a "successful segregationist".

== Unsuccessful gubernatorial campaign ==
In his subsequent campaign for governor in 1963, Coleman lost the Democratic nomination to Paul B. Johnson, Jr., a son of a former governor. Segregationist Johnson painted Coleman as a racial moderate and friend of the Kennedy administration. Paul Johnson's campaign staff charged that during the 1960 presidential campaign Coleman had allowed Kennedy to sleep in the Governor's Mansion in the bed formerly used by the late Governor and United States Senator Theodore Bilbo. Johnson went on to defeat the Democrat-turned-Republican Rubel Phillips in the 1963 general election, which presented Mississippi voters with a new-at-the-time opportunity to choose between candidates of different parties.

== Federal judicial service ==
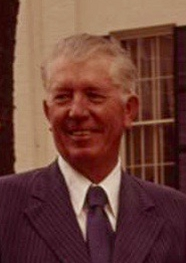
Coleman in 1976

President Kennedy offered Coleman various posts, including United States Secretary of the Army and United States Ambassador to Australia, but Coleman declined.

Coleman was nominated by President Lyndon B. Johnson on June 22, 1965, to a seat on the United States Court of Appeals for the Fifth Circuit vacated by Judge Benjamin Franklin Cameron. Even though controversy erupted over his pro-segregation positions such as his opposition to Blacks voting, he was confirmed by the United States Senate on July 26, 1965, and received his commission the same day.

He served as Chief Judge from 1979 to 1981. He assumed senior status on May 31, 1981. His service terminated on January 31, 1984, due to his retirement.

== Post judicial service and death ==
After his retirement from the federal bench, Coleman returned to the private practice of law in Choctaw County and also farmed until he suffered a severe stroke on December 11, 1990. He died on September 28, 1991, in Ackerman.

== Honor ==
J. P. Coleman State Park, a state park in Mississippi, is named after him.

== Personal ==
Coleman married Margaret Janet Dennis on May 2, 1937, and they had one son, who is a lawyer. Coleman's grandson, Josiah D. Coleman is a justice of the Mississippi Supreme Court.

Party political offices
Preceded by Hugh L. White	Democratic nominee for Governor of Mississippi; 1955	Succeeded by Ross Barnett
Legal offices
Preceded by Greek L. Rice	Attorney General of Mississippi; 1952–1956	Succeeded by Joseph Turner Patterson
Political offices
Preceded by Hugh L. White	Governor of Mississippi; 1956–1960	Succeeded by Ross Barnett
Legal offices
Preceded by Benjamin Franklin Cameron	Judge of the United States Court of Appeals for the Fifth Circuit; 1965–1981	Succeeded by E. Grady Jolly
Preceded by John Robert Brown	Chief Judge of the United States Court of Appeals for the Fifth Circuit; 1979–1981	Succeeded by John Cooper Godbold
