= 1963 Mississippi gubernatorial election =

- November 5, 1963
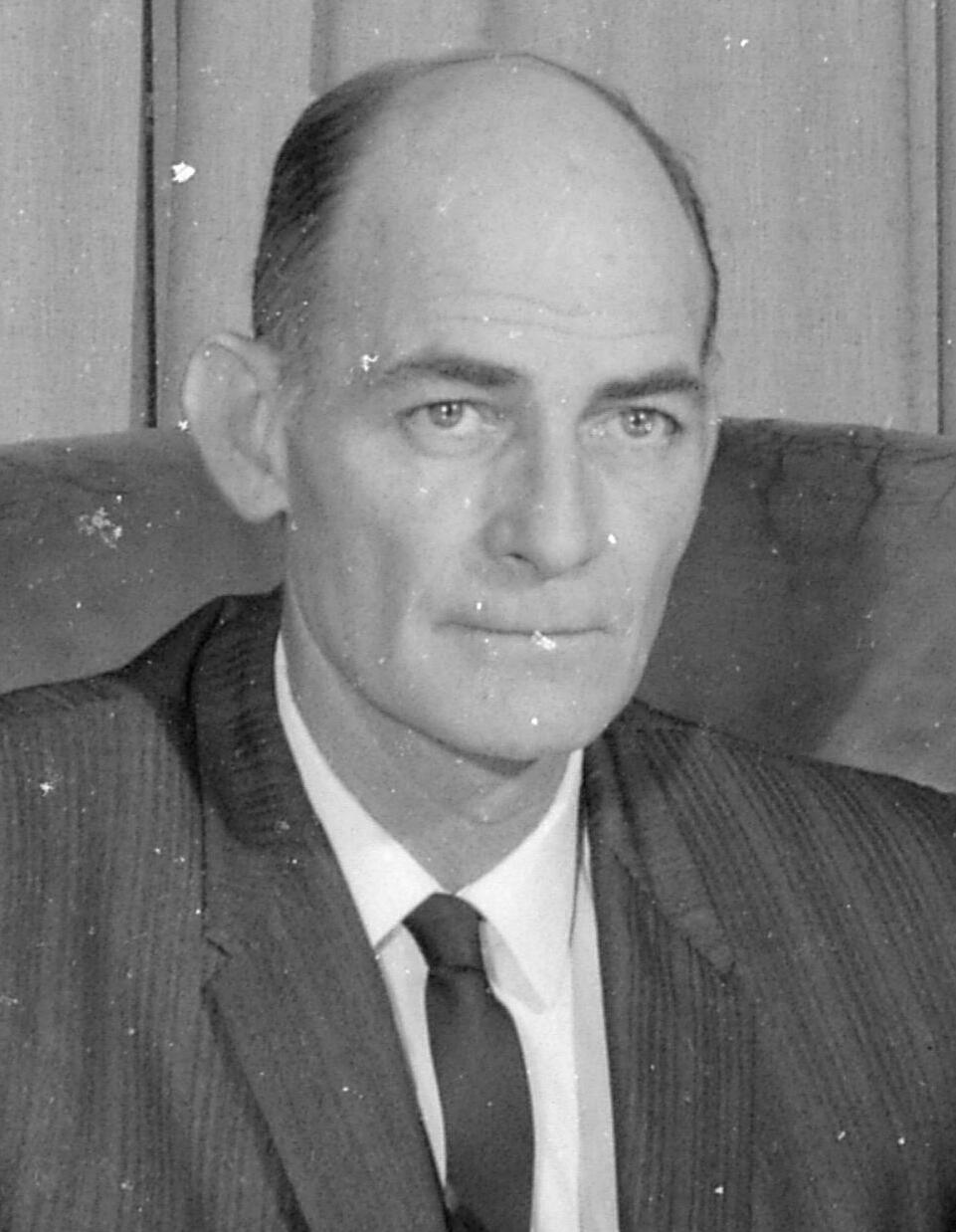

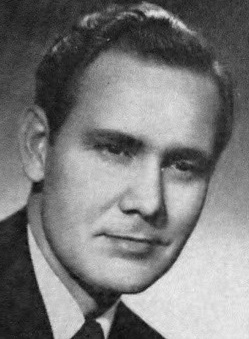
| Nominee | Paul B. Johnson Jr. | Rubel Phillips |
| Party | Democratic | Republican |
| Popular vote | 225,456 | 138,515 |
| Percentage | 61.94% | 38.06% |
- County results Johnson: 50–60% 60–70% 70–80% 80–90% Phillips: 50–60% 60–70%
Governor before election
Ross Barnett
Democratic
Elected Governor
Paul B. Johnson Jr.
Democratic

The 1963 Mississippi gubernatorial election took place on November 5, 1963, in order to elect the Governor of Mississippi. Incumbent Democrat Ross Barnett was term-limited, and could not run for reelection to a second term.

== Democratic primary ==
No candidate received a majority in the Democratic primary, which featured 4 contenders, so a runoff was held between the top two candidates. The runoff election was won by Lieutenant Governor Paul B. Johnson Jr., the son of former governor Paul B. Johnson Sr., who defeated former governor James P. Coleman.

As was common at the time, the Democratic primary had higher turnout than the general election, as it was a given the Democrat would win in the era of the Solid South.

=== Results ===
Primary results by county: Johnson: 30–40% 40–50% 50–60% 60–70% Coleman: 30–40% 40–50% 50–60% 70–80% Sullivan: 30–40% 40–50% 50–60% 60–70%

Mississippi Democratic gubernatorial primary, 1963
| Party | Candidate | Votes | % |
|---|---|---|---|
| Democratic | Paul B. Johnson Jr. | 182,540 | 38.48 |
| Democratic | James P. Coleman | 156,296 | 32.95 |
| Democratic | Charles L. Sullivan | 132,321 | 27.89 |
| Democratic | Robert F. Mason | 3,257 | 0.69 |
| Total votes | | 474,414 | 100.00 |

=== Runoff ===
Runoff results by county: Johnson: 50–60% 60–70% 70–80% Coleman: 50–60% 60–70% 70–80%

Mississippi Democratic gubernatorial primary runoff, 1963
| Party | Candidate | Votes | % |
|---|---|---|---|
| Democratic | Paul B. Johnson Jr. | 261,493 | 57.29 |
| Democratic | James P. Coleman | 194,958 | 42.71 |
| Total votes | | 456,451 | 100.00 |

== General election ==
=== Campaign ===
For the first time since 1947 and only the third time since 1877, the Republicans put up a candidate for governor. Rubel Phillips, a former Democratic public service commissioner, switched parties to challenge Johnson.

Both candidates used country musicians in their campaigns. Phillips declared himself a "redneck", and the Republicans sang to the tune of "Reuben, Reuben", the refrain, "Rubel, Rubel, we're all rebels,/Fighting for our native land,/Against the Kennedy carpetbaggers,/Bobby, Jack, and all the clan." The Democrats used a song composed by Houston Davis of Jackson: "Rubel, Rubel, little Rubel, Poor misguided Democrat, when it comes to the final test, The GOP will leave you flat. ..."

Phillips said he spent $500,000 on the first gubernatorial campaign. Democrats claimed that the New York City investment banker Nelson Trimble Levings, who owned a plantation in Mississippi and had opposed Senator Bilbo in the 1946 Democratic primary, was dispatching Rockefeller cash to Phillips, a point the GOP denied.

Johnson carried the backing of the Mississippi Municipal Association, which consisted of most of the state's Democratic mayors. That endorsement prompted Phillips to cancel a scheduled appearance before the group.

Johnson refused to debate Phillips and expressed irritation over the fact that he even had to face a Republican challenger. Carroll Gartin, the former lieutenant governor seeking to regain the position on Johnson's ticket, declared Phillips' candidacy "a great disservice" to the state because "everyone had a chance to run as a Democrat." The Jackson Daily News similarly declared it a "nuisance" to hold a general election after two all-encompassing Democratic primaries.

In Water Valley in Yalobusha County in northern Mississippi, Phillips challenged Johnson's proposal to change election laws, suggesting that his rival would create "a dictatorship ... so Republicans and Independents cannot run for office." Unlike in neighboring Louisiana, which in 1975 abolished one of the three elections in the cycle, the Mississippi legislature never revised the state's election law. Some had argued that such a change might hamper efforts to recruit northern industries into the South.

The gubernatorial contest was a prelude to the 1964 national election in Mississippi. Paul Johnson at first, in an appearance in Baton Rouge, Louisiana, endorsed "free electors" for 1964, a move strongly opposed by Republicans. Irwin Lee Potter of Arlington, Virginia, chairman of the GOP's "Operation Dixie" said, "The South has been that route before. It didn't work, can't work." Ultimately, Governor Paul Johnson endorsed Goldwater over Lyndon B. Johnson, but he was critical of the Republican Party in making the selection. Bidwell Adam called Goldwater "a true Republican where the dollar is involved" but not really "a conservative as to the social revolutions being forced by judicial edicts and bayonets at the hands of ruthless dictatorships." Goldwater's position on the Tennessee Valley Authority, which serves northeastern Mississippi, prompted Phillips to distance himself from the senator on that issue. Formerly known as "the young firebrand from the Gulf Coast," Adam was elected lieutenant governor in 1927 at the age of thirty-three. Wirt Yerger recalled him in later years as "an old-line, redneck Democrat who literally hated Republicans or the thought of any Republican in public office." Still Adam endorsed Goldwater in 1964 and Nixon in 1972.

Bidwell Adam declared that Paul Johnson "towers like the giants of the forest above the man (Phillips) who is grazing in the pastures of filth." He predicted voters would give Phillips "the brass ring of political ingratitude that he so richly deserves" and claimed that Phillips would be "buried in a political boneyard of forgotten men." Phillips later recalled that he and Adam "buried the hatchet and became warm friends" after that campaign when they worked together on the same side in a lawsuit.

The campaign featured an exchange between GOP chairman Yerger and Senator James Eastland, who missed nearly thirty roll call votes while in Mississippi to campaign for Paul Johnson. In 1966, Wirt Yerger resigned as GOP chairman and considered challenging Eastland until U.S. Representative Prentiss Walker of Mize entered the race. Years later, Yerger said that Walker's decision to relinquish his House seat after one term for the vagaries of a Senate race was "very devastating" to the growth of the Mississippi GOP.

In Parchman in Sunflower County, Phillips declared the Mississippi State Penitentiary "a disgrace" and called for a constitutional board "free of politics to exercise responsible leadership" at the institution then known for brutal practices. Phillips recounted the case of inmate Kimble Berry, serving time for manslaughter who was granted leave in 1961 by acting Governor Johnson but showed up in a Cadillac in Massachusetts claiming that he had been authorized to recover burglary loot.

=== Results ===
Mississippi gubernatorial election, 1963
| Party | Candidate | Votes | % |
|---|---|---|---|
| Democratic | Paul B. Johnson Jr. | 225,456 | 61.94 |
| Republican | Rubel Phillips | 138,515 | 38.06 |
| Total votes | | 363,971 | 100.00 |
| Democratic hold | | | |

== Works cited ==
- Hathorn, Billy Burton (November 1985). "Challenging the Status Quo: Rubel Lex Phillips and the Mississippi Republican Party (1963–1967)". The Journal of Mississippi History. XLVII (4): 240–265.
