= 1948 United States presidential election in Mississippi =

- November 2, 1948
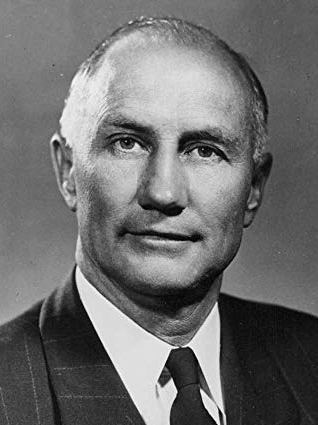

Nominee	Strom Thurmond	Harry S. Truman
Party	Democratic (Mississippi)	National Democratic
Alliance	States’ Rights Democratic
Home state	South Carolina	Missouri
Running mate	Fielding L. Wright	Alben W. Barkley
Electoral vote	9	0
Popular vote	167,538	19,384
Percentage	87.17%	10.09%
County results
Thurmond
50–60%
60–70%
70–80%
80–90%
90–100%
President before election
Harry S. Truman
Democratic
Elected President
Harry S. Truman
Democratic

The 1948 United States presidential election in Mississippi took place on November 2, 1948, in Mississippi as part of the wider United States presidential election of 1948.

The Democratic Party candidate, South Carolina governor Strom Thurmond, overwhelmingly won Mississippi against fellow Democrat, incumbent President Harry S. Truman by a margin of 148,154 votes, or 77.08%. Although Truman was the national Democratic Party candidate, Thurmond managed to be placed on the ballot in Mississippi, South Carolina, Louisiana, and Alabama as the official "Democratic" candidate. Outside of these four states, Thurmond was forced to run under the label of the States’ Rights Democratic Party. The Republican Party candidate, New York governor Thomas E. Dewey, had no impact on the race in Mississippi, only obtaining 5,043 votes total, or 2.62 percent of the popular vote, and failing to attract even ten percent of the vote in any Mississippi county.

Mississippi in this era was a one-party state dominated by the Democratic Party, so that the only competitive contests were Democratic primaries that were by law excluded to non-whites until the landmark court case of Smith v. Allwright. Ever since seeing the potential effect on the United States' image abroad (and ability to win the Cold War against the radically egalitarian rhetoric of Communism) of the beating and blinding of Isaac Woodard three hours after being discharged from the army, President Truman was attempting to launch a Civil Rights bill, involving desegregation of the military. Southern Democrats immediately made such cries as "unconstitutional", "Communist inspired," "a blow to the loyal South and its traditions," "unwarranted and harmful," "not the answer," and "does irreparable harm to interracial relations".

Southern Democrats walked out at the party's national convention in Philadelphia because of Truman's endorsement of civil rights for African Americans, and Mississippi, the state with the highest proportion of blacks in its population, was alongside neighbouring Alabama the most opposed to Truman. Indeed, whereas only half of Alabama's delegation walked out, all of Mississippi's did. This segregationist faction met on July 17, 1948, in Birmingham, Alabama, nominating South Carolina governor Strom Thurmond as its nominee for president. Mississippi governor Fielding L. Wright was nominated for vice president. Mississippi pledged its Democratic electors to Thurmond on August 3 without debate, and although a group of nine students from Mississippi State College qualified as Truman/Barkley electors after that ticket had sought to find electors from University of Mississippi students, all the nine nominated Truman electors personally supported the Dixiecrats rather than the national party.

Among white voters, 92% supported Thurmond.

== Polls ==
Source	Ranking	As of
Chattanooga Daily Times	Certain I (Flip)	October 15, 1948
The Montgomery Advertiser	Certain I (Flip)	October 24, 1948
The Miami News	Certain I (Flip)	October 25, 1948
Mount Vernon Argus	Certain I (Flip)	November 1, 1948
Oakland Tribune	Certain I (Flip)	November 1, 1948

== Results ==
1948 United States presidential election in Mississippi
Party	Candidate	Votes	Percentage	Electoral votes
Democratic	Strom Thurmond	167,538	87.17%	9
National Democratic	Harry Truman (incumbent)	19,384	10.09%	0
Republican	Thomas E. Dewey	5,043 (Note: The Dewey vote was a fusion of the “Republican” and “Independent Republican” slates. Dewey obtained 2,595 votes on the “Republican” ticket and 2,448 votes on the ”Independent Republican“ ticket.)	2.62%	0
Progressive	Henry A. Wallace	225	0.12%	0
Totals		192,190	100.00%	9
Voter turnout (voting age)		16.0%		

=== Results by county ===
1948 United States presidential election in Mississippi by county
County	James Strom Thurmond Dixiecrat/Democratic		Thomas Edmund Dewey Republican		Harry S. Truman National Democratic		Henry Agard Wallace Progressive		Margin (Note: Because Thurmond was listed as the “Democratic” nominee in Mississippi and carried the state, whilst Truman ran second, all margins given are Thurmond vote minus Truman vote and percentage margins Thurmond percentage minus Truman percentage unless noted otherwise.)		Total votes cast
County	#	%	#	%	#	%	#	%	#	%	Total votes cast
Adams	2,032	92.36%	95	4.32%	71	3.23%	2	0.09%	1,937 (Note: In this county where Dewey ran second ahead of Truman, margin given is Thurmond vote minus Dewey vote and percentage margin Thurmond percentage minus Dewey percentage.)	88.04%	2,200
Alcorn	1,984	64.19%	91	2.94%	1,013	32.77%	3	0.10%	971	31.42%	3,091
Amite	1,559	95.59%	17	1.04%	55	3.37%	0	0.00%	1,504	92.22%	1,631
Attala	2,299	93.19%	32	1.30%	130	5.27%	6	0.24%	2,169	87.92%	2,467
Benton	679	83.83%	11	1.36%	118	14.57%	2	0.25%	561	69.26%	810
Bolivar	2,579	88.50%	115	3.95%	219	7.52%	1	0.03%	2,360	80.98%	2,914
Calhoun	1,074	56.59%	36	1.90%	786	41.41%	2	0.11%	288	15.18%	1,898
Carroll	1,138	92.82%	14	1.14%	74	6.04%	0	0.00%	1,064	86.78%	1,226
Chickasaw	1,826	93.45%	12	0.61%	115	5.89%	1	0.05%	1,711	87.56%	1,954
Choctaw	1,110	86.31%	43	3.34%	131	10.19%	2	0.16%	979	76.12%	1,286
Claiborne	741	95.61%	14	1.81%	19	2.45%	1	0.13%	722	93.16%	775
Clarke	1,763	91.44%	17	0.88%	144	7.47%	4	0.21%	1,619	83.97%	1,928
Clay	1,604	95.14%	22	1.30%	59	3.50%	1	0.06%	1,545	91.64%	1,686
Coahoma	1,959	84.48%	113	4.87%	246	10.61%	1	0.04%	1,713	73.87%	2,319
Copiah	2,523	95.90%	19	0.72%	89	3.38%	0	0.00%	2,434	92.52%	2,631
Covington	1,532	90.81%	16	0.95%	135	8.00%	4	0.24%	1,397	82.81%	1,687
DeSoto	1,299	89.59%	14	0.97%	137	9.45%	0	0.00%	1,162	80.14%	1,450
Forrest	5,296	90.07%	167	2.84%	406	6.90%	11	0.19%	4,890	83.17%	5,880
Franklin	1,160	94.54%	12	0.98%	55	4.48%	0	0.00%	1,105	90.06%	1,227
George	1,032	88.51%	25	2.14%	108	9.26%	1	0.09%	924	79.25%	1,166
Greene	885	86.94%	14	1.38%	118	11.59%	1	0.10%	767	75.35%	1,018
Grenada	1,405	91.17%	26	1.69%	109	7.07%	1	0.06%	1,296	84.10%	1,541
Hancock	1,400	78.87%	151	8.51%	222	12.51%	2	0.11%	1,178	66.36%	1,775
Harrison	6,325	84.81%	415	5.56%	692	9.28%	26	0.35%	5,633	75.53%	7,458
Hinds	13,705	89.84%	492	3.23%	1,041	6.82%	17	0.11%	12,664	83.02%	15,255
Holmes	2,139	96.18%	24	1.08%	61	2.74%	0	0.00%	2,078	93.44%	2,224
Humphreys	1,116	97.55%	11	0.96%	17	1.49%	0	0.00%	1,099	96.06%	1,144
Issaquena	209	92.89%	5	2.22%	11	4.89%	0	0.00%	198	88.00%	225
Itawamba	1,050	60.52%	50	2.88%	634	36.54%	1	0.06%	416	23.98%	1,735
Jackson	2,671	71.94%	238	6.41%	783	21.09%	21	0.57%	1,888	50.85%	3,713
Jasper	1,795	92.43%	26	1.34%	121	6.23%	0	0.00%	1,674	86.20%	1,942
Jefferson	967	97.09%	14	1.41%	15	1.51%	0	0.00%	952	95.58%	996
Jefferson Davis	1,452	94.04%	51	3.30%	41	2.66%	0	0.00%	1,401	90.74%	1,544
Jones	5,709	87.45%	193	2.96%	599	9.18%	27	0.41%	5,110	78.27%	6,528
Kemper	1,389	91.56%	29	1.91%	98	6.46%	1	0.07%	1,291	85.10%	1,517
Lafayette	1,184	59.80%	48	2.42%	744	37.58%	4	0.20%	440	22.22%	1,980
Lamar	1,342	91.35%	36	2.45%	91	6.19%	0	0.00%	1,251	85.16%	1,469
Lauderdale	5,322	87.55%	171	2.81%	578	9.51%	8	0.13%	4,744	78.04%	6,079
Lawrence	1,261	94.03%	13	0.97%	66	4.92%	1	0.07%	1,195	89.11%	1,341
Leake	2,387	92.38%	12	0.46%	180	6.97%	5	0.19%	2,207	85.41%	2,584
Lee	3,127	81.31%	82	2.13%	636	16.54%	1	0.03%	2,491	64.77%	3,846
Leflore	2,749	92.47%	80	2.69%	139	4.68%	5	0.17%	2,610	87.79%	2,973
Lincoln	3,082	97.01%	40	1.26%	52	1.64%	3	0.09%	3,030	95.37%	3,177
Lowndes	2,755	93.80%	66	2.25%	116	3.95%	0	0.00%	2,639	89.85%	2,937
Madison	1,831	93.18%	51	2.60%	81	4.12%	2	0.10%	1,750	89.06%	1,965
Marion	2,491	90.75%	49	1.79%	205	7.47%	0	0.00%	2,286	83.28%	2,745
Marshall	1,215	86.97%	29	2.08%	152	10.88%	1	0.07%	1,063	76.09%	1,397
Monroe	2,281	77.09%	54	1.82%	624	21.09%	0	0.00%	1,657	56.00%	2,959
Montgomery	1,573	91.77%	35	2.04%	105	6.13%	1	0.06%	1,468	85.64%	1,714
Neshoba	2,833	90.51%	33	1.05%	260	8.31%	4	0.13%	2,573	82.20%	3,130
Newton	2,439	92.04%	39	1.47%	169	6.38%	3	0.11%	2,270	85.66%	2,650
Noxubee	1,031	91.89%	17	1.52%	74	6.60%	0	0.00%	957	85.29%	1,122
Oktibbeha	1,786	89.12%	58	2.89%	158	7.88%	2	0.10%	1,628	81.24%	2,004
Panola	1,935	89.17%	38	1.75%	195	8.99%	2	0.09%	1,740	80.18%	2,170
Pearl River	1,925	90.76%	46	2.17%	146	6.88%	4	0.19%	1,779	83.88%	2,121
Perry	764	87.12%	25	2.85%	87	9.92%	1	0.11%	677	77.20%	877
Pike	3,648	92.59%	69	1.75%	221	5.61%	2	0.05%	3,427	86.98%	3,940
Pontotoc	1,535	80.16%	28	1.46%	348	18.17%	4	0.21%	1,187	61.99%	1,915
Prentiss	988	59.34%	74	4.44%	602	36.16%	1	0.06%	386	23.18%	1,665
Quitman	1,046	90.17%	21	1.81%	91	7.84%	2	0.17%	955	82.33%	1,160
Rankin	2,677	97.03%	23	0.83%	57	2.07%	2	0.07%	2,620	94.96%	2,759
Scott	2,339	92.60%	15	0.59%	170	6.73%	2	0.08%	2,169	85.87%	2,526
Sharkey	745	95.76%	10	1.29%	23	2.96%	0	0.00%	722	92.80%	778
Simpson	2,342	91.06%	59	2.29%	171	6.65%	0	0.00%	2,171	84.41%	2,572
Smith	1,900	85.24%	33	1.48%	295	13.23%	1	0.04%	1,605	72.01%	2,229
Stone	1,053	93.77%	17	1.51%	50	4.45%	3	0.27%	1,003	89.32%	1,123
Sunflower	2,482	92.85%	55	2.06%	136	5.09%	0	0.00%	2,346	87.76%	2,673
Tallahatchie	2,122	86.75%	37	1.51%	287	11.73%	0	0.00%	1,835	75.02%	2,446
Tate	1,196	84.70%	16	1.13%	199	14.09%	1	0.07%	997	70.61%	1,412
Tippah	1,658	77.04%	66	3.07%	425	19.75%	3	0.14%	1,233	57.29%	2,152
Tishomingo	1,073	56.95%	98	5.20%	711	37.74%	2	0.11%	362	19.21%	1,884
Tunica	715	95.33%	12	1.60%	23	3.07%	0	0.00%	692	92.26%	750
Union	1,420	72.30%	63	3.21%	478	24.34%	3	0.15%	942	47.96%	1,964
Walthall	1,202	93.03%	5	0.39%	85	6.58%	0	0.00%	1,117	86.45%	1,292
Warren	3,602	86.38%	245	5.88%	320	7.67%	3	0.07%	3,282	78.71%	4,170
Washington	2,447	82.14%	271	9.10%	260	8.73%	1	0.03%	2,176	73.04%	2,979
Wayne	1,235	89.75%	4	0.29%	137	9.96%	0	0.00%	1,098	79.79%	1,376
Webster	1,078	76.78%	47	3.35%	277	19.73%	2	0.14%	801	57.05%	1,404
Wilkinson	809	92.56%	21	2.40%	43	4.92%	1	0.11%	766	87.64%	874
Winston	1,828	86.84%	33	1.57%	240	11.40%	4	0.19%	1,588	75.44%	2,105
Yalobusha	1,382	88.14%	49	3.13%	135	8.61%	2	0.13%	1,247	79.53%	1,568
Yazoo	2,297	95.99%	26	1.09%	70	2.93%	0	0.00%	2,227	93.06%	2,393
Totals	167,538	87.17%	5,043	2.62%	19,384	10.09%	225	0.12%	148,154	77.08%	192,190

==== Counties that flipped from Democratic to Dixiecrat ====
All 82 counties

== Analysis ==
Thurmond carried all of Mississippi's 82 counties, forty-five with over ninety percent of the vote and seventy with over eighty percent. Truman only managed to break forty percent in one county, while Dewey was held to less than ten percent in every county. The "weakest" region for Thurmond came from the northeastern corner where he failed to break sixty percent in four counties. These northeastern counties are the least fertile in the state and were (and remain) populated by the smallest proportion of African Americans. They were also — within the one-party Democratic primary system — always opposed to the free-market business and landowning interests, who were Thurmond's chief support base. Consequently, whites in the far northeast of Mississippi — even those with enough money to pay the poll tax — supported the public works, minimum wage laws, and working hour laws of President Truman's "Fair Deal" which were strongly opposed by Black Belt landowners. In these northeastern hill counties preoccupations with race were also less overwhelming.

Thurmond's vote constitutes the highest-ever statewide vote percentage for a candidate who was not a national major party nominee, and the only time a third-party candidate swept every county in any state. This was the first time ever that a Democrat won without carrying Mississippi, and the first time since 1872 that the state voted against the national Democrats.

== See also ==
- United States presidential elections in Mississippi

== Works cited ==
- Black, Earl; Black, Merle (1992). The Vital South: How Presidents Are Elected. Harvard University Press. ISBN 0674941306.
