= Sam Lumpkin =

American politician

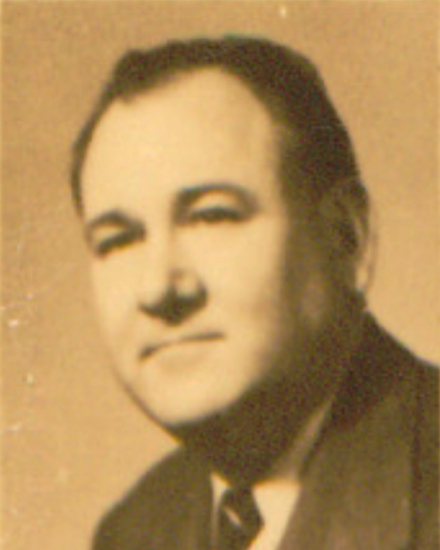

21st Lieutenant Governor of Mississippi
- In office January 19, 1948 – January 21, 1952
- Governor: Fielding Wright
- Preceded by: Fielding Wright
- Succeeded by: Carroll Gartin

55th Speaker of the Mississippi House of Representatives
- In office January 2, 1940 – January 4, 1944
- Preceded by: Fielding Wright
- Succeeded by: Walter Sillers Jr.

Member of the Mississippi House of Representatives from Lee County
- In office January 5, 1932 – January 4, 1944
- Preceded by: David C. Langston
- Succeeded by: H. A. Boren

Personal details
- Born: Samuel Edgerton Lumpkin; April 21, 1908 Hudsonville, Mississippi, U.S.
- Died: July 9, 1964 (aged 56) Tupelo, Mississippi, U.S.
- Party: Democratic
- Education: Cumberland University
- Profession: Lawyer

Military service
- Allegiance: United States
- Branch/service: United States Army
- Years of service: 1942–1944
- Battles/wars: World War II

Samuel Edgerton Lumpkin (April 21, 1908 – July 9, 1964) was an American politician from Tupelo, Mississippi. A Democrat, he served as the 21st Lieutenant Governor of Mississippi from 1948 to 1952 under Governor Fielding L. Wright. He was born in Hudsonville in 1908.

Before elevation to Lt. Governor he served in the Mississippi House of Representatives, eventually rising to position of the Speaker of the House in 1940.

He was also a delegate to the 1948 Democratic National Convention and was an unsuccessful candidate for Democratic nomination for governor in 1951.

During the 1952 presidential election he endorsed Republican nominee, General Dwight D. Eisenhower and led so-called "eisencrats" faction in Mississippi.

Lumpkin was found dead of a heart attack at his home's pool in 1964.

Party political offices
Preceded by Fielding L. Wright	Democratic nominee for Lieutenant Governor of Mississippi; 1947	Succeeded by Carroll Gartin
Political offices
Preceded by Fielding L. Wright	Lieutenant Governor of Mississippi; 1948–1952	Succeeded by Carroll Gartin
