= Stirling Homex Corporation =

- Type: Public
- Industry: Manufacturing
- Founded: 1968
- Defunct: 1972
- Fate: Bankruptcy
- Headquarters: Avon, New York, United States

The Stirling Homex Corporation was an American manufacturing company based in Avon, New York. It produced modular prefabricated homes. It went bankrupt in 1972.

== History ==
Stirling Homex Corporation was a company founded by two brothers, David and William Stirling. It was founded in Delaware in 1968. It manufactured and located modular homes. It became a publicly traded company on February 20, 1970. At its initial public offering, the company's stock sold at $16.50 per share. By the middle of March, its stock traded at $51 per share.

Stirling Homex misled investors by inflating its reported revenue, stating in its consolidated financial statements that the value of completed housing modules which were assigned to contracts were counted as revenue and asserting that said contracts were backed by the United States Department of Housing and Urban Development. In reality, most contracts were not backed by the federal department and revenue was reported for homes which were not paid for and which had not been turned over to customers.

On July 7, 1972, ten banks demanded Stirling Homex pay off $38.8 million in loans early, citing company deviations from the terms of their credit agreements. The company announced the resignation of the Stirling brothers from their posts and that it would file for bankruptcy on July 10. At that time, the company had produced about 10,000 housing units with a collective value of about $35 million. Of these, only 900 had been sold and paid for, while most were left in fields around the United States wrapped in plastic. By August, the company's shares were trading at less than one dollar in value on the stock market.

In 1975, the company's executives were charged with fraud and conspiracy and in 1977 four of them (including the Stirling brothers) were sentenced to short prison terms by federal judge Marvin E. Frankel. The SEC also took punitive action against the company's auditor, Peat Marwick, banning the firm from obtaining new corporate clients for six months and requiring it to review its auditing methods.

== Works cited ==
- Markham, Jerry W. (2006). A Financial History of Modern U.S. Corporate Scandals: From Enron to Reform. M. E. Sharpe. ISBN 9780765615831.
- Viebig, Jan; Poddig, Thorsten; Varmaz, Armin, eds. (2008). Equity Valuation: Models from Leading Investment Banks. John Wiley & Sons. ISBN 9780470758809.
