= George L. Sheldon =

American politician, Nebraska (1870–1960)

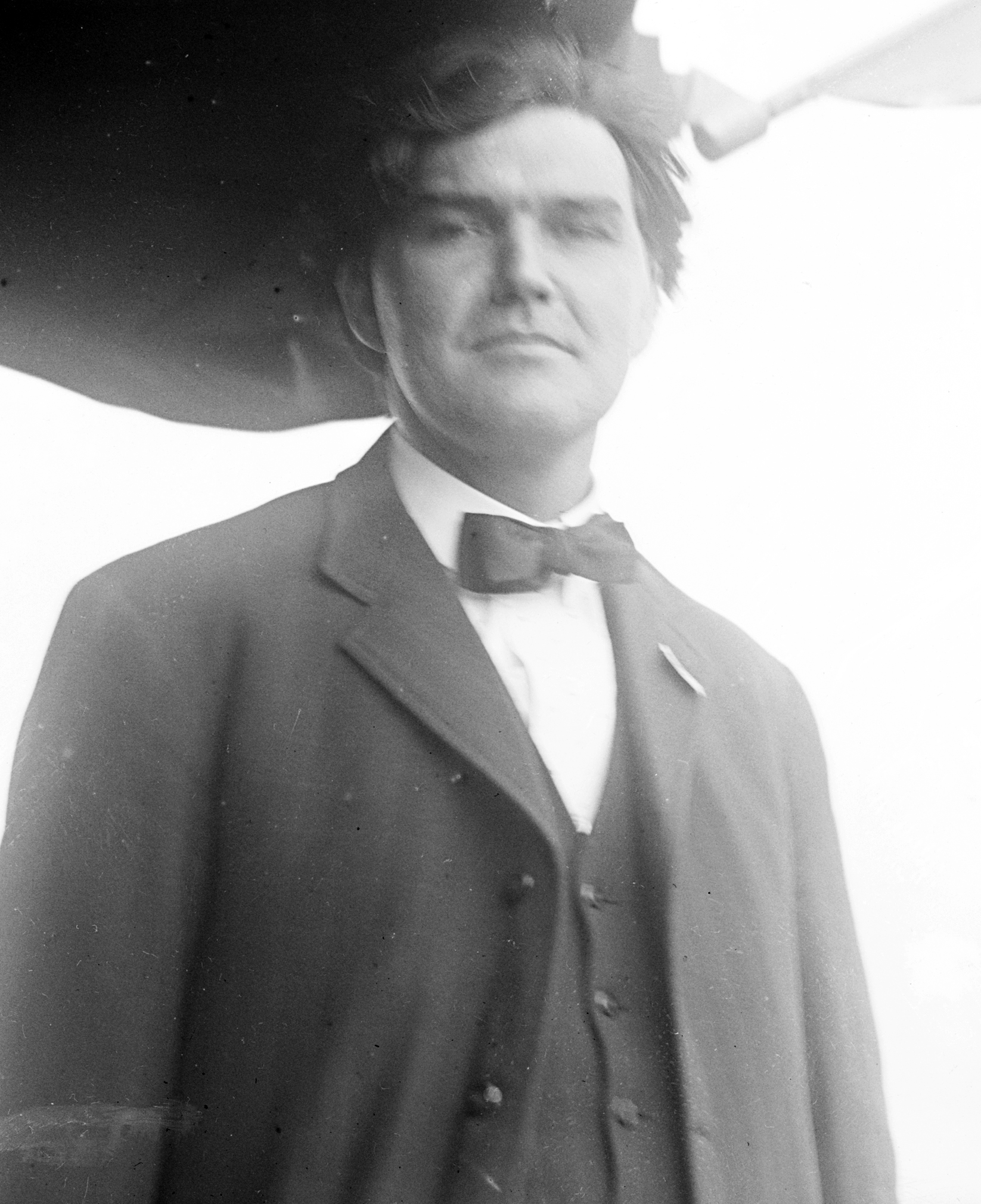

14th Governor of Nebraska
- In office January 3, 1907 – January 7, 1909
- Lieutenant: Melville R. Hopewell
- Preceded by: John H. Mickey
- Succeeded by: Ashton C. Shallenberger

Personal details
- Born: May 31, 1870 Nehawka, Nebraska, U.S.
- Died: April 4, 1960 (aged 89) Greenville, Mississippi, U.S.
- Party: Republican
- Spouse: Rose Higgins

George Lawson Sheldon (May 31, 1870 – April 4, 1960) was an American politician and 14th governor of Nebraska with service from 1907 until 1909. He was the first native of his state to become its governor. He was a Republican from the progressive wing of that party, which was identified nationally with Theodore Roosevelt of New York.

== Early life ==
Born in Nehawka in Cass County in southeastern Nebraska, Sheldon received a bachelor's degree in 1892 from the University of Nebraska. As a cadet at Nebraska he commanded Company A of the university's Military Department headed by Lieutenant John J. Pershing. He led Company A to win the Maiden Prize of $1,500 at the National Competitive Drills in Omaha on June 13, 1892. Sheldon was also a founding member of the Varsity Rifles, which became Pershing Rifles. He then attended Harvard University for one year, receiving a second bachelor's degree cum laude in 1893. He married Rose Higgins in 1895, and they had four children.

== Career ==
During the Spanish–American War, Sheldon served as a captain in the 3rd Nebraska Volunteer Infantry, commanded by Colonel William Jennings Bryan of Nebraska, who had just lost to William McKinley of Ohio in the race for president two years before. En route to Cuba, the regiment traveled through Mississippi, and Sheldon liked what he saw there.

After the war, Sheldon returned to Nebraska. In 1902, he purchased a plantation of 1,700 acres near Greenville, Mississippi. That same year, at the age of 32, he successfully ran for state senate in Nebraska, and was re-elected in 1904.

The railroads had been central to the creation of Nebraska territory through the Kansas-Nebraska Act of 1854, but public perception among white Nebraskans had changed. When the Union Pacific and Burlington railroads were "opening up" the land to settlement (and the dispossession of the Native American inhabitants), towns were eager to court the railroads. However, anger at apparent railroad domination of Nebraska politics had been growing for decades.

On June 16, 1906, Sheldon and fellow progressive Norris Brown, who was then attorney general, announced that they were seeking the Republican nominations for governor and U.S. Senator, respectively. Sheldon was on record as favoring regulation of the railroads, having said, "You can trust the representatives of the people to deal fairly with the railroads, but you cannot trust the railroads to deal fairly with the people."

Sheldon defeated the Democratic nominee, Ashton C. Shallenberger, who was viewed as "being under railroad influence," 97,858 (53.5 percent) to 84,885 (46.5 percent). Sheldon became the first Nebraska governor born in the state and one of its youngest ever.

With huge majorities in both chambers of the legislature (Nebraska's legislature would not become unicameral for another twenty years), Sheldon moved quickly to redeem his campaign promises. Accordingly, the 1907 legislative session has been characterized by historians James C. Olson and Ronald C. Naugle as creating "more important and more permanent changes in the political structure of the state than those of any other." These included prohibitions on the free train passes that railroads had previously distributed generously to influence politicians, a restriction on train passenger fares to no more than two cents, and the establishment of a state railway commission. That year Sheldon also signed a child labor law, an anti-discrimination law, a law forbidding brewers from owning any part of a saloon, and legislation creating a state board of pardons and a bureau charged with investigating agricultural pests and plant diseases.

The 1907 legislature also enacted a statewide direct primary law, but that would continue to be a hot political issue for many years and be frequently revised.

Sheldon ran into two political hurdles to his re-election. First, bank deposits had seemed especially at risk during the financial panic of 1907, when many banks failed. However, although Sheldon personally favored a state law guaranteeing bank deposits similar to the one in Oklahoma territory, the Republican convention overwhelmingly voted it down. Second, he fought hard for an option for individual counties to prohibit liquor, losing many "wet" votes that he might otherwise have picked up.

Ashton Shallenberger secured the Democratic nomination and campaigned hard for a state bank guarantee law. He skillfully allowed "dries" to think he was for prohibition and "wets" to think he was against it. Shallenberger decisively beat Sheldon, 132,960 to 125,976, and the Democrats gained majority control of both houses of the legislature.

=== Mississippi ===
After his defeat, Sheldon moved to his plantation in Mississippi, and became active in state politics there.

He was elected to the Mississippi House of Representatives. While Sheldon was publicly a staunch Republican, he was elected in the 1918 Democratic primary. He registered as a Republican while in the Mississippi House of Representatives. He retired after a single term due to financial conditions on his plantation. In 1927, he organized the moribund state Republican Party. After the election, Herbert Hoover appointed Sheldon the Mississippi state head of the Internal Revenue Service. He ran unsuccessfully for governor in 1947, having polled only 2.5 percent of the ballots cast.

== Death ==
Sheldon died in Greenville, Mississippi, on April 4, 1960. He is interred at Greenville Cemetery.

Party political offices
Preceded by John H. Mickey	Republican nominee for Governor of Nebraska; 1906, 1908	Succeeded by Chester Hardy Aldrich
Vacant Title last held by Benjamin King	Republican nominee for Governor of Mississippi; 1947	Vacant Title next held by Rubel Phillips
Political offices
Preceded by John H. Mickey	Governor of Nebraska; 1907–1909	Succeeded by Ashton C. Shallenberger
