= 1947 Mississippi gubernatorial election =

1947 Mississippi Democratic gubernatorial primary
- November 4, 1947
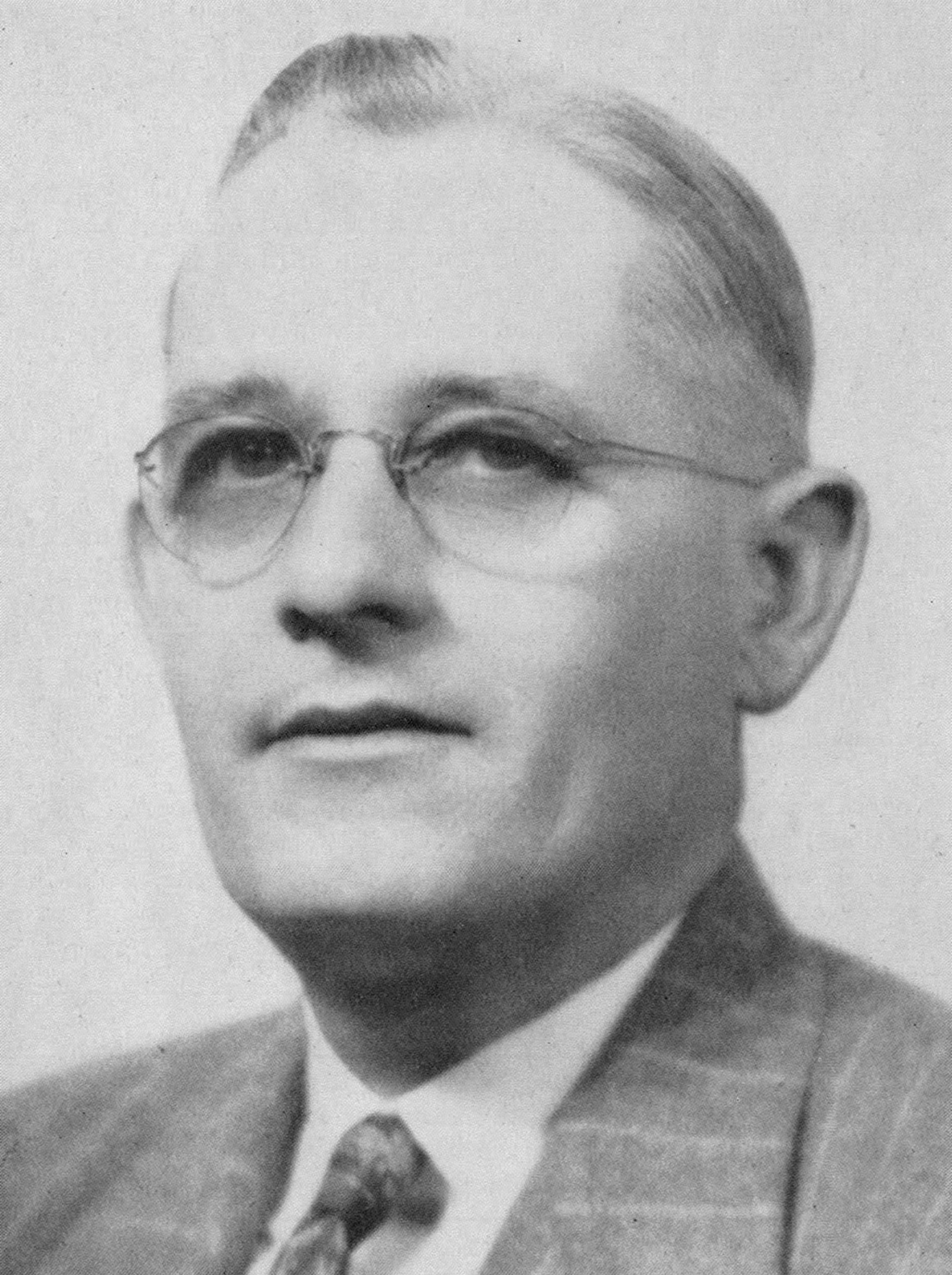

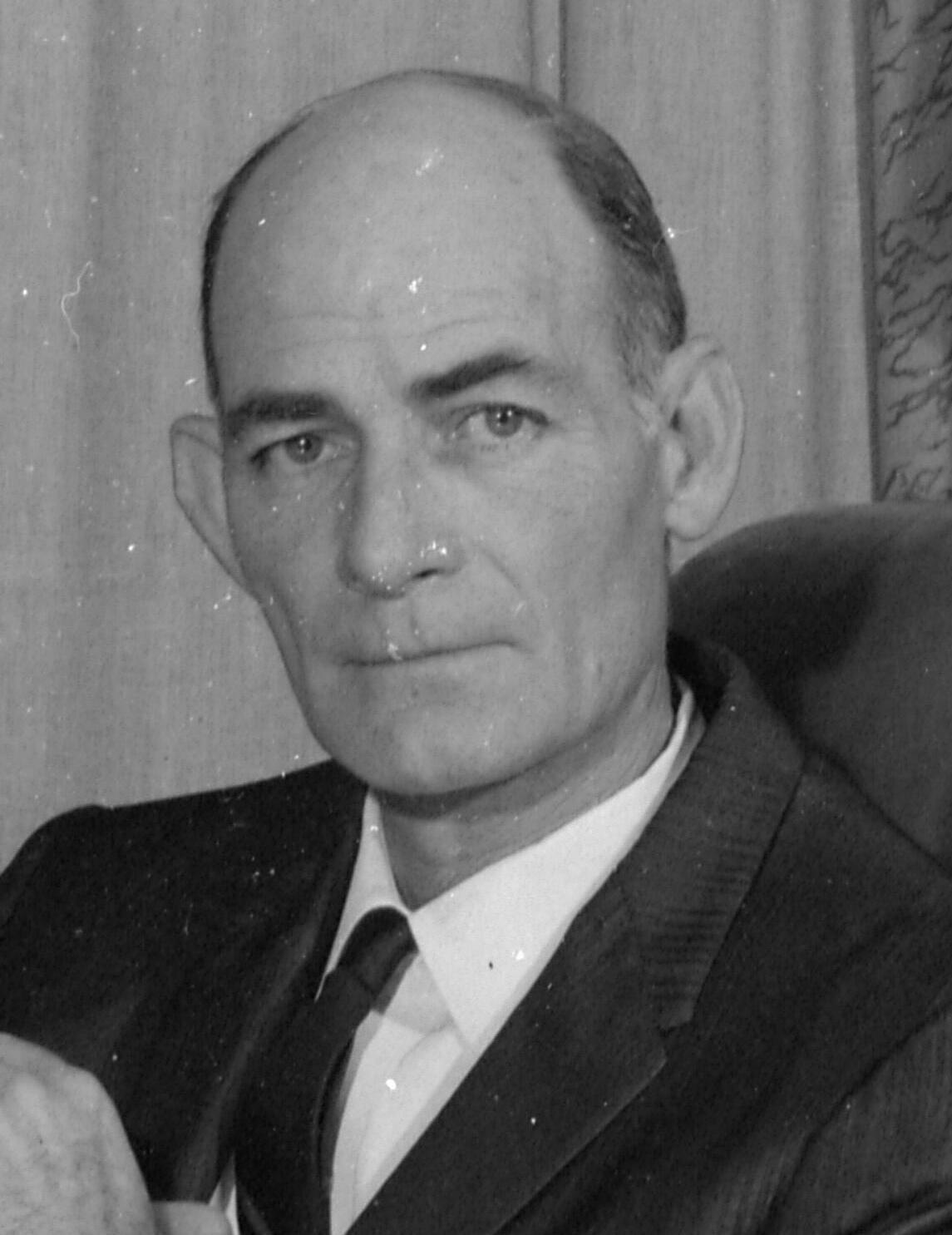

Candidate	Fielding L. Wright	Paul B. Johnson Jr.	Jesse M. Byrd
Party	Democratic	Democratic	Democratic
Popular vote	182,771	112,123	37,997
Percentage	51.71%	30.70%	10.40%
- Wright: 30–40% 40–50% 50–60% 60–70% 70–80% 80–90% 90–100% Johnson: 40–50% 50–60% Byrd: 40–50%
Governor before election
Fielding L. Wright
Democratic
Elected Governor
Fielding L. Wright
Democratic

The 1947 Mississippi gubernatorial election took place on November 4, 1947, to elect the governor of Mississippi. Incumbent Democrat Fielding L. Wright, who had succeeded to the governorship a year prior following the death of Thomas L. Bailey, ran for election to a first full term.

As was common at the time, the Democratic candidate won in a landslide, so therefore the Democratic primary was the real contest, and winning the primary was considered tantamount to election. In fact, this was the first election since 1881 in which the Republican Party even fielded a nominal candidate, former Governor of Nebraska George L. Sheldon, and the first since 1919 in which any opposition party did.

== Democratic primary ==
In the Democratic primary, incumbent Governor Fielding L. Wright defeated lawyer Paul B. Johnson Jr., the son of former Governor Paul B. Johnson Sr., and three other candidates. He received a majority (55%) of the vote, thereby eliminating the need for a runoff.

=== Results ===
Mississippi Democratic gubernatorial primary, 1947
Party	Candidate	Votes	%
Democratic	Fielding L. Wright (incumbent)	202,014	55.31
Democratic	Paul B. Johnson Jr.	112,123	30.70
Democratic	Jesse M. Byrd	37,997	10.40
Democratic	Frank L. Jacobs	8,750	2.40
Democratic	William L. Spinks	4,344	1.19
Total votes		365,228	100.00

== General election ==
=== Campaign ===
In the general election, Wright ran against Republican George L. Sheldon, who served as Governor of Nebraska from 1907 until 1909. Sheldon moved to Mississippi after his service as governor and served a single term in the Mississippi House of Representatives, becoming an influential figure in the state Republican Party. However, the Republicans had such minimal influence in Mississippi at the time that Wright won in a landslide with almost 98% of the vote.

=== Results ===
Mississippi gubernatorial election, 1947
Party	Candidate	Votes	%
Democratic	Fielding L. Wright (incumbent)	166,095	97.59
Republican	George L. Sheldon	4,102	2.41
Total votes		170,197	100.00
Democratic hold			
