= Mary Cain (editor) =

American journalist

Mary Dawson Cain (August 17, 1904 – May 6, 1984) was an American newspaper editor, political activist, and gubernatorial candidate in Mississippi. A Democrat, she advocated for conservative causes and is particularly remembered for her campaigns against the Social Security tax. She ran for Governor of Mississippi in 1951 and 1955, the first woman to do so.

== Life ==
Cain was born in Burke, Louisiana, the daughter of Charles Goodrich Dawson and Tulula Bryant Dela Garza Dawson. She was educated in public schools in Louisiana and Mississippi, and graduated from Hillman College. She married mechanic and business owner John Lambdin Cain in 1924.

Cain owned and edited The Summit Sun, a weekly newspaper in Pike County, Mississippi, contributing "Mary Cain's Column". Cain used her paper to promote segregation and conservative causes, and was particularly critical of the federal government, especially the Social Security tax.

Cain became the first woman ever to run for Governor of Mississippi in 1951, when she led an unsuccessful campaign as a Democrat. She ran again in 1955.

Cain came to national attention in 1952 when she refused to pay $42.87 in Social Security taxes, calling the program "unconstitutional, immoral and un-American". She attempted to dodge the Internal Revenue Service by selling The Summit Sun to her niece for a nominal sum of $1 and closing her bank accounts. Later that year the IRS seized the paper and padlocked the door; Cain responded by cutting the chains with a hacksaw and sending them back to the agency, earning herself the nickname "Hacksaw Mary". Her tax battle went to the Supreme Court; Cain lost, but the government subsequently dropped the suit.

In 1965, she appeared in an NBC News documentary titled Mississippi: A Self Portrait, where she proclaimed her support for segregation and its values, particularly in Mississippi. "I think Mississippi has done wonders with our race relations, she said. I think that it has been a marvelous thing that our Negroes has come as far as they have, and I feel no sense of guilt and I do not have to apologize for what we have done for them." Later she elaborated on her views on race, framing them on theological grounds. "Now I feel that God had a purpose in creating the races separate,” she said. I am so proud of Negroes who are proud of being Negroes. They are what God made them. And I'm proud of being White because I am what my White race has made me. I am White today because my parents practiced segregation, and I wouldn't be anything but White. And I love Negroes who wouldn't be anything but Negroes."

Cain died on May 6, 1984, at the age of 79 in McComb, Mississippi.
