= Stanford Morse =

American lawyer and politician

Stanford Everett Morse, Jr.

Mississippi State Senator from Harrison and Stone counties
- In office 1956–1964

Personal details
- Born: May 31, 1926 Gulfport, Mississippi, U.S.
- Died: February 28, 2002 (aged 75)
- Party: Democrat (before 1963); Republican (after 1963)
- Spouse: Sally Ann Reilly Morse
- Children: Stanford E. Morse, III; Joseph Reilly Morse
- Parent(s): Stanford E. Morse, Sr. Ernestine Neuhardt Morse
- Education: University of Mississippi; University of Mississippi School of Law
- Occupation: Lawyer

Stanford Everett Morse Jr. (May 31, 1926 – February 28, 2002), was a Mississippi lawyer who served two terms in the Mississippi State Senate. Initially a Democrat, Morse became a Republican in 1963 as part of an unsuccessful candidacy for the office of Lieutenant Governor of Mississippi.

He lived in Gulfport, Mississippi.

== See also ==
- List of American politicians who switched parties in office
