= 1927 Mississippi lieutenant gubernatorial election =

1927 Mississippi Democratic lieutenant gubernatorial primary runoff
- August 23, 1927
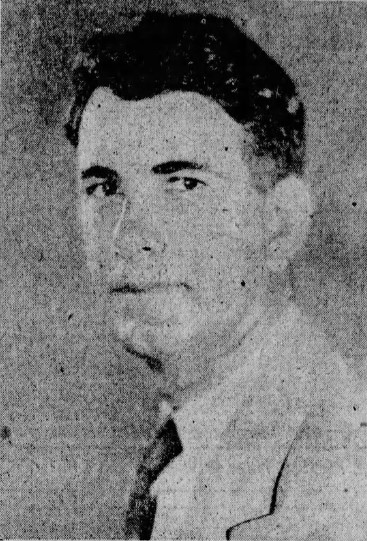

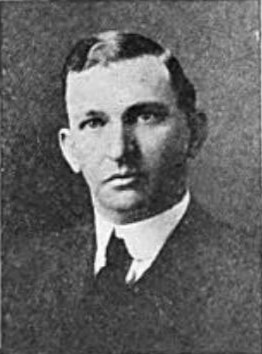
Candidate	Bidwell Adam	M. P. L. Love
Party	Democratic	Democratic
Popular vote	140,236	139,722
Percentage	50.09%	49.91%
Lieutenant governor before election
Dennis Murphree
Democratic
Elected Lieutenant governor
Bidwell Adam
Democratic

The 1927 Mississippi lieutenant gubernatorial election took place on November 8, 1927, in order to elect the Lieutenant Governor of Mississippi. Incumbent Democrat Dennis Murphree assumed the office of governor upon the death of Henry L. Whitfield on March 18, 1927. This left the Lieutenant Governor's office vacant until Bidwell was sworn in after the election.

As was common at the time, the Democratic candidate ran unopposed in the general election; therefore, the Democratic primary was the real contest, and winning the primary was considered tantamount to election.

== Democratic primary ==
No candidate received a majority in the Democratic primary, which featured three contenders, so a runoff was held between the top two candidates. The runoff election was won by Bidwell Adam, who narrowly defeated State Senator M. P. L. Love.

=== Results ===
August 2, 1927 Democratic primary
Party	Candidate	Votes	%
Democratic	M. P. L. Love	135,366	49.94%
Democratic	Bidwell Adam	105,127	38.79%
Democratic	John L. Smith	30,537	11.27%
Total votes		271,030	100.00%

=== Runoff ===
August 23, 1927 Democratic primary runoff
Party	Candidate	Votes	%
Democratic	Bidwell Adam	140,236	50.09%
Democratic	M. P. L. Love	139,722	49.91%
Total votes		279,958	100.00%
