= 1939 Mississippi lieutenant gubernatorial election =

1939 Mississippi Democratic lieutenant gubernatorial primary
- August 8, 1939
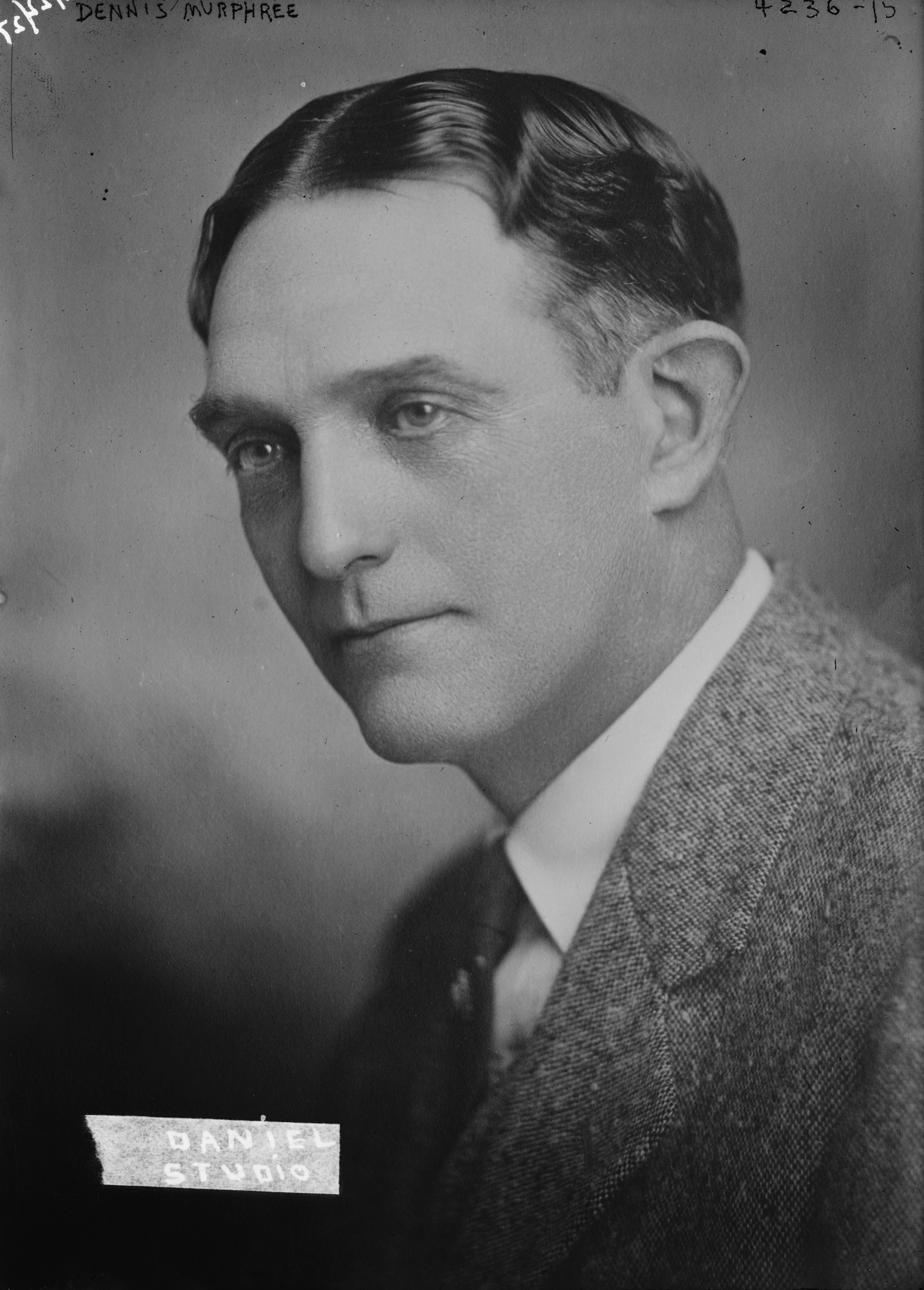

Candidate	Dennis Murphree	Clarence E. Morgan
Party	Democratic	Democratic
Popular vote	172,201	94,028
Percentage	56.76%	30.99%
- County results Murphree: 30–40% 40–50% 50–60% 60–70% 70–80% 80–90% Morgan: 40–50% 50–60% 60–70%
Lieutenant governor before election
J.B. Snider
Democratic
Elected Lieutenant governor
Dennis Murphree
Democratic

The 1939 Mississippi lieutenant gubernatorial election took place on November 7, 1939, in order to elect the Lieutenant Governor of Mississippi. Incumbent Democrat J. B. Snider chose not to seek reelection to a second term, instead choosing to run for governor.

As was common at the time, the Democratic candidate ran unopposed in the general election; therefore, the Democratic primary was the real contest, and winning the primary was considered tantamount to election.

== Democratic primary ==
=== Candidates ===
- Dennis Murphree, former Lieutenant Governor.
- Clarence E. Morgan, former State Senator from the 22nd district and District Attorney of the 5th circuit court district.
- Nelson T. Levings, future candidate for U.S. Senate in 1946.
- James C. Notgrass

=== Results ===
August 8, 1939 Democratic primary
Party	Candidate	Votes	%
Democratic	Dennis Murphree	172,201	56.76%
Democratic	Clarence E. Morgan	94,028	30.99%
Democratic	Nelson T. Levings	22,451	7.40%
Democratic	James C. Notgrass	14,722	4.85%
Total votes		303,402	100.00%

== General election ==
In the general election, Murphree won unopposed.

=== Results ===
November 7, 1939 General Election
Party	Candidate	Votes	%
Democratic	Dennis Murphree	60,235	100.00%
Total votes		60,235	100.00%
Democratic hold			
