= 1927 United States gubernatorial elections =

- November 8, 1927; April 17, 1928 (LA)

3 governorships
	Majority party	Minority party
Party	Republican	Democratic
Seats before	26	22
Seats after	27	21
Seat change	▲1	▼1
Seats up	0	3
Seats won	1	2
- Democratic hold Republican gain

United States gubernatorial elections were held in 1927, in three states. Kentucky, Louisiana and Mississippi hold their gubernatorial elections in odd numbered years, every 4 years, preceding the United States presidential election year.

== Race summary ==
=== Results ===
State	Incumbent	Party	First elected	Result	Candidates
Kentucky	William J. Fields	Democratic	1923	Incumbent term-limited. New governor elected. Republican gain.	✓ Flemon D. Sampson (Republican) 52.09%; J. C. W. Beckham (Democratic) 47.91%
Louisiana (Held, 17 April 1928)	Oramel H. Simpson	Democratic	1926 (Note: Simpson took office after his predecessor (Henry L. Fuqua) died.)	Incumbent lost nomination to full term. New governor elected. Democratic hold.	✓ Huey Long (Democratic) 96.14%; Etienne J. Caire (Republican) 3.86%
Mississippi	Dennis Murphree	Democratic	1927 (Note: Murphree took office after his predecessor (Henry L. Whitfield) died.)	Incumbent lost nomination to full term. New governor elected. Democratic hold.	✓ Theodore G. Bilbo (Democratic); Unopposed
