= 1923 United States gubernatorial elections =

- November 6, 1923; April 22, 1924 (LA)

4 governorships
	Majority party	Minority party
Party	Democratic	Republican
Seats before	26	22
Seats after	27	21
Seat change	▲1	▼1
Seats up	3	1
Seats won	4	0
- Democratic gain Democratic hold

United States gubernatorial elections were held in 1923, in four states. Kentucky, Louisiana and Mississippi hold their gubernatorial elections in odd numbered years, every 4 years, preceding the United States presidential election year.

In Maryland, the usual four-year term was reduced to three years as a one-off, so that from 1926 the elections would be held in an even-numbered year rather than as previously in the odd numbered year preceding the United States presidential election year.

== Results ==
State	Incumbent	Party	Status	Opposing candidates
Kentucky	Edwin P. Morrow	Republican	Term-limited, Democratic victory	William J. Fields (Democratic) 53.25% Charles I. Dawson (Republican) 45.81% William S. Demuth (Farmer Labor) 0.54% M. A. Brinkmar (Socialist) 0.40%
Louisiana (Held, 22 April 1924)	John M. Parker	Democratic	Term-limited, Democratic victory	Henry L. Fuqua (Democratic) 97.90% James S. Millikin (Republican) 2.10% (Democratic primary run-off results); Henry L. Fuqua 57.77% Hewitt Bouanchaud 42.23%
Maryland	Albert C. Ritchie	Democratic	Re-elected, 55.97%	Alexander Armstrong (Republican) 43.26% William H. Champlin (Socialist) 0.46% Verne L. Reynolds (Labor) 0.31%
Mississippi	Lee M. Russell	Democratic	Term-limited, Democratic victory	Henry L. Whitfield (Democratic) 100.00% (Democratic primary run-off results); Henry L. Whitfield 53.28% Theodore G. Bilbo 46.72%
