= George Dumah Riley =

American politician (1874–1935)

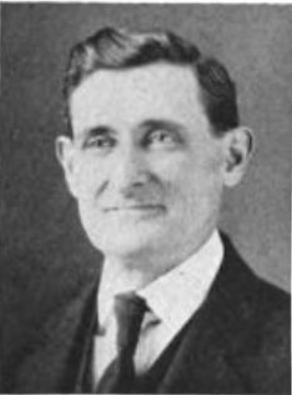
- 1924

26th State Auditor of Mississippi
- In office January 16, 1924 – January 16, 1928
- Governor: Henry L. Whitfield; Dennis Murphree
- Preceded by: W. J. Miller
- Succeeded by: Carl C. White

Personal details
- Born: March 26, 1874 Hebron, Mississippi, U.S.
- Died: June 18, 1935 (aged 61) Jackson, Mississippi, U.S.
- Political party: Democratic

George Dumah Riley (March 26, 1874 - June 18, 1935) was an American politician. He served as State Auditor of Mississippi from 1924 to 1928.

== Early life ==
George Dumah Riley was born in Hebron, Mississippi, on March 26, 1874. He was the son of Confederate veteran Edward Madison Riley and Zillah Berry Riley. Riley grew up on a farm. He had four brothers: John F., S. Paul, J. Luke, and T. Jack, and a sister. He attended the public schools of his native Lawrence County as well as Simpson County. He then graduated from Hebron High School and the Mississippi Normal College.

== Career ==
Riley worked as a teacher at public schools in his early career. He moved to Houston, Mississippi, in 1896. From 1912 to 1924 he was Superintendent of Public Education of Chickasaw County. For two years concurrently, Riley served as President of the Mississippi Association of County Superintendents. In August 1923 Riley ran for the Democratic primary for State Auditor of Mississippi and won the November general election. He served a term from 1924 to 1928.

During his term, Riley "installed the first uniform system of accounts for the state institutions and of the counties" and persuaded the Legislature to have a uniform fiscal year.

In March 1926, Riley announced his campaign for Governor of Mississippi. In 1931, Riley ran for State Insurance Commissioner. He was elected to a four-year term starting in 1932. In 1935, he announced he was running for re-election. Nobody had announced a campaign opposing him. Riley died in office after a ten-day illness on June 18, 1935, in Jackson. He died at 1:05 PM of a cerebral hemorrhage. J. H. Johnson was appointed by Governor Conner to succeed Riley as Insurance Commissioner.

== Personal life ==
Riley was an active Freemason, where he held offices at state and national levels. He was married to Lillie Amanda Dexter. They had three children: George Evans, Lillian Dyer, and Gertrude Inez.
