= 1935 Mississippi gubernatorial election =

1935 Mississippi Democratic gubernatorial primary runoff
- November 5, 1935
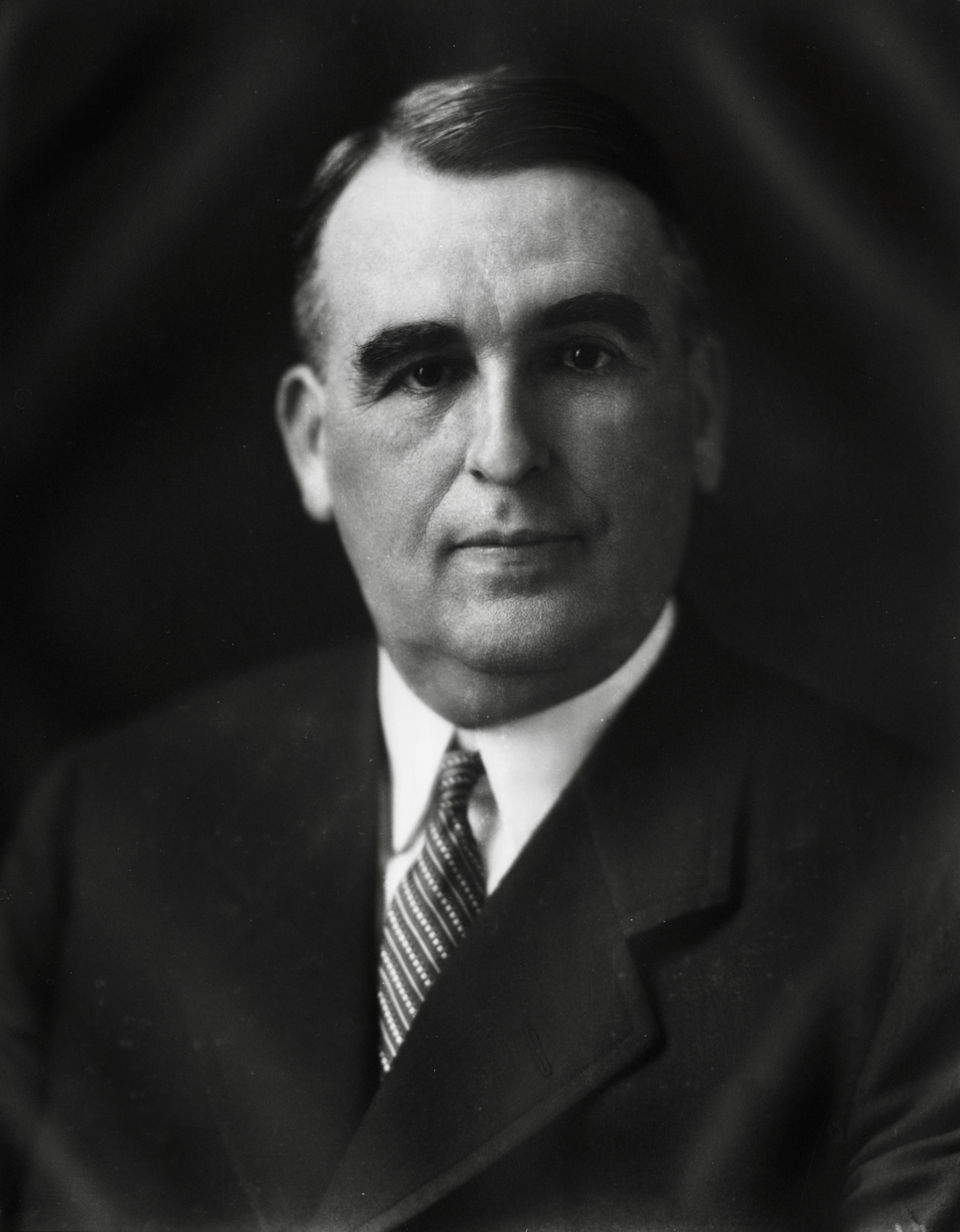

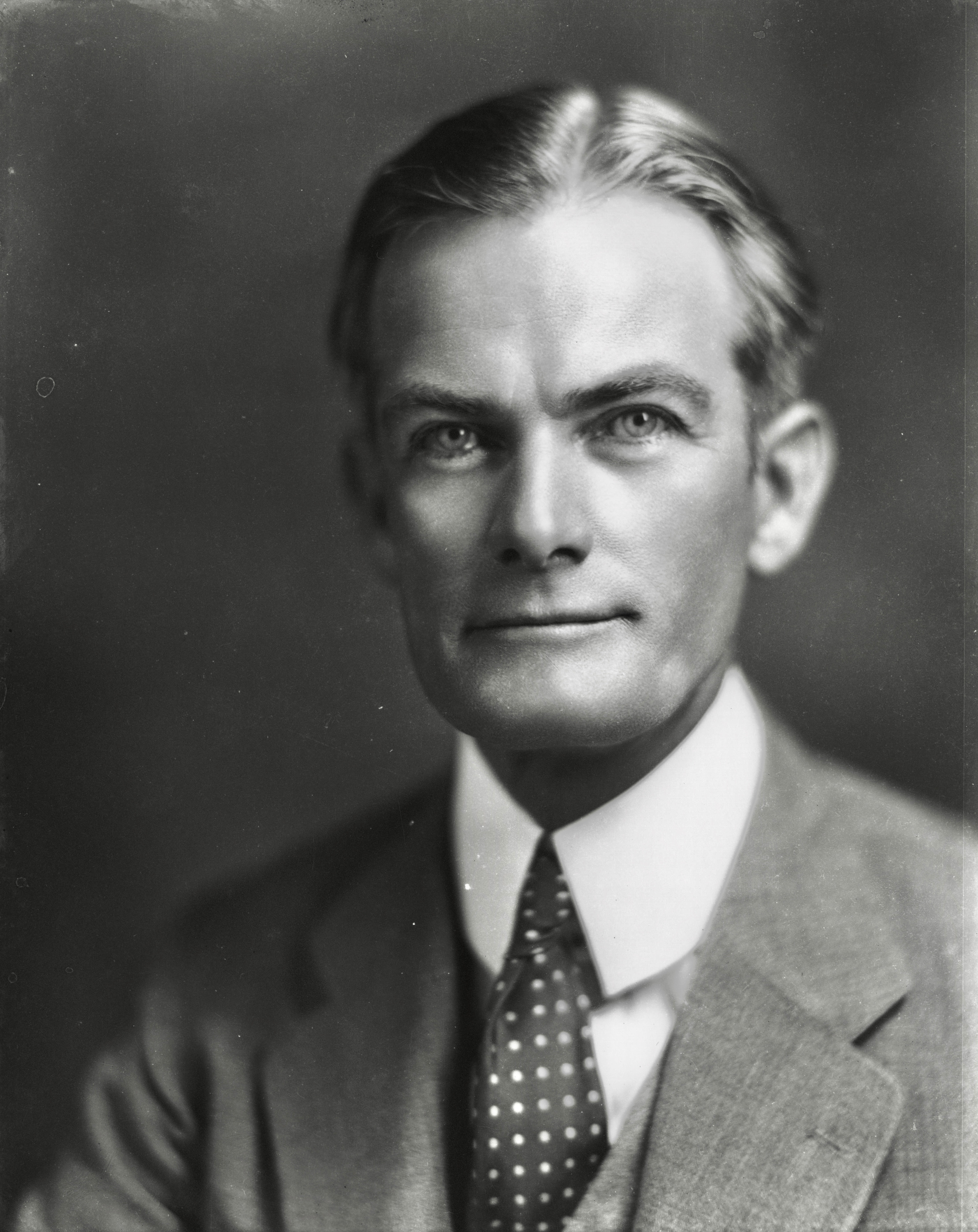
Candidate	Hugh L. White	Paul B. Johnson Sr.
Party	Democratic	Democratic
Popular vote	182,771	170,705
Percentage	51.71%	48.29%
- County results White: 50–60% 60–70% 70–80% Johnson: 50–60% 60–70%
Governor before election
Martin S. Conner
Democratic
Elected Governor
Hugh L. White
Democratic

The 1935 Mississippi gubernatorial election took place on November 5, 1935, in order to elect the Governor of Mississippi. Incumbent Democrat Martin S. Conner was term-limited, and could not run for reelection to a second term. As was common at the time, the Democratic candidate ran unopposed in the general election; therefore, the Democratic primary was the real contest, and winning the primary was considered tantamount to election.

== Democratic primary ==
No candidate received a majority in the Democratic primary, which featured five contenders, so a runoff was held between the top two candidates. The runoff election was won by Mayor of Columbia Hugh L. White, who defeated former U.S. Representative Paul B. Johnson, Sr.

=== Results ===
Mississippi Democratic gubernatorial primary, 1935
Party	Candidate	Votes	%
Democratic	Paul B. Johnson Sr.	111,523	31.47
Democratic	Hugh L. White	110,625	31.22
Democratic	Dennis Murphree	92,997	26.24
Democratic	Lester C. Franklin	34,700	9.79
Democratic	E. A. Copeland	4,541	1.28
Total votes		354,386	100.00

=== Runoff ===
Mississippi Democratic gubernatorial primary runoff, 1935
Party	Candidate	Votes	%
Democratic	Hugh L. White	182,771	51.71
Democratic	Paul B. Johnson Sr.	170,705	48.29
Total votes		353,476	100.00

== General election ==
In the general election, White ran unopposed.

=== Results ===
Mississippi gubernatorial election, 1935
Party	Candidate	Votes	%
Democratic	Hugh L. White	45,881	100.00
Total votes		45,881	100.00
Democratic hold			
