= 1940 United States Senate election in Mississippi =

1940 Democratic Senate primary election in Mississippi
- August 27, 1940
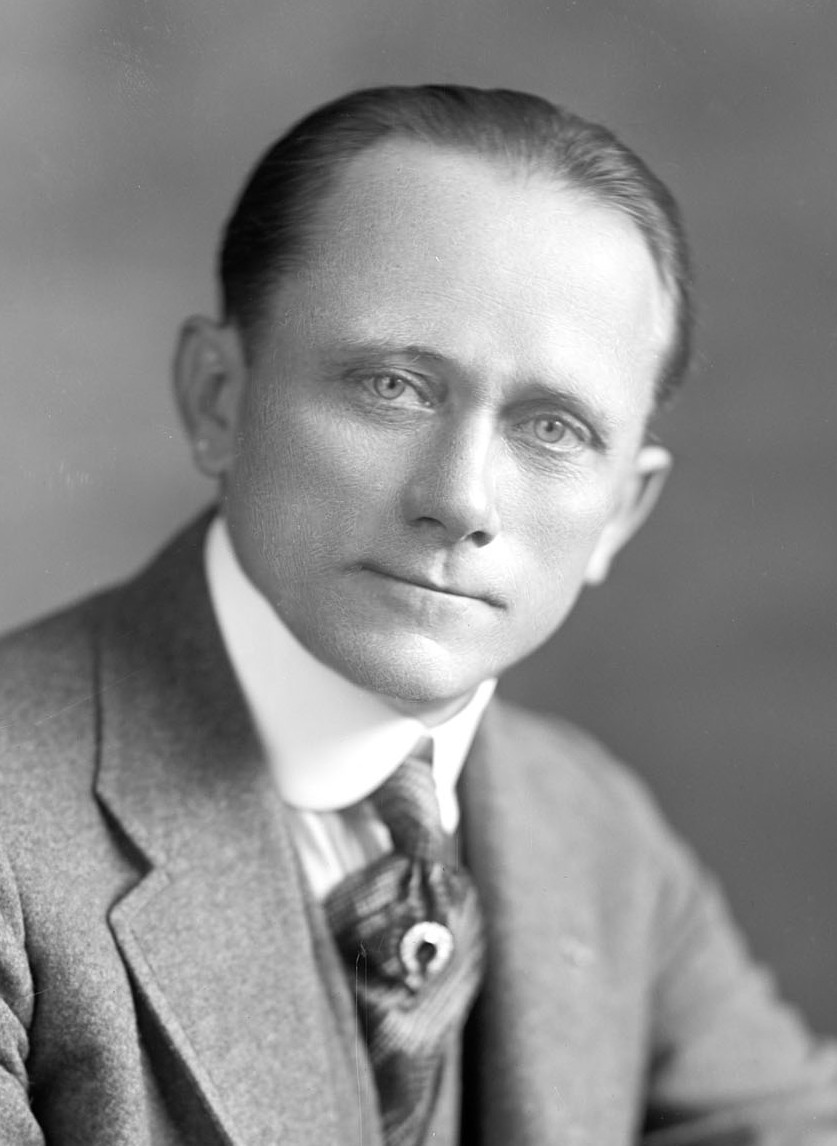

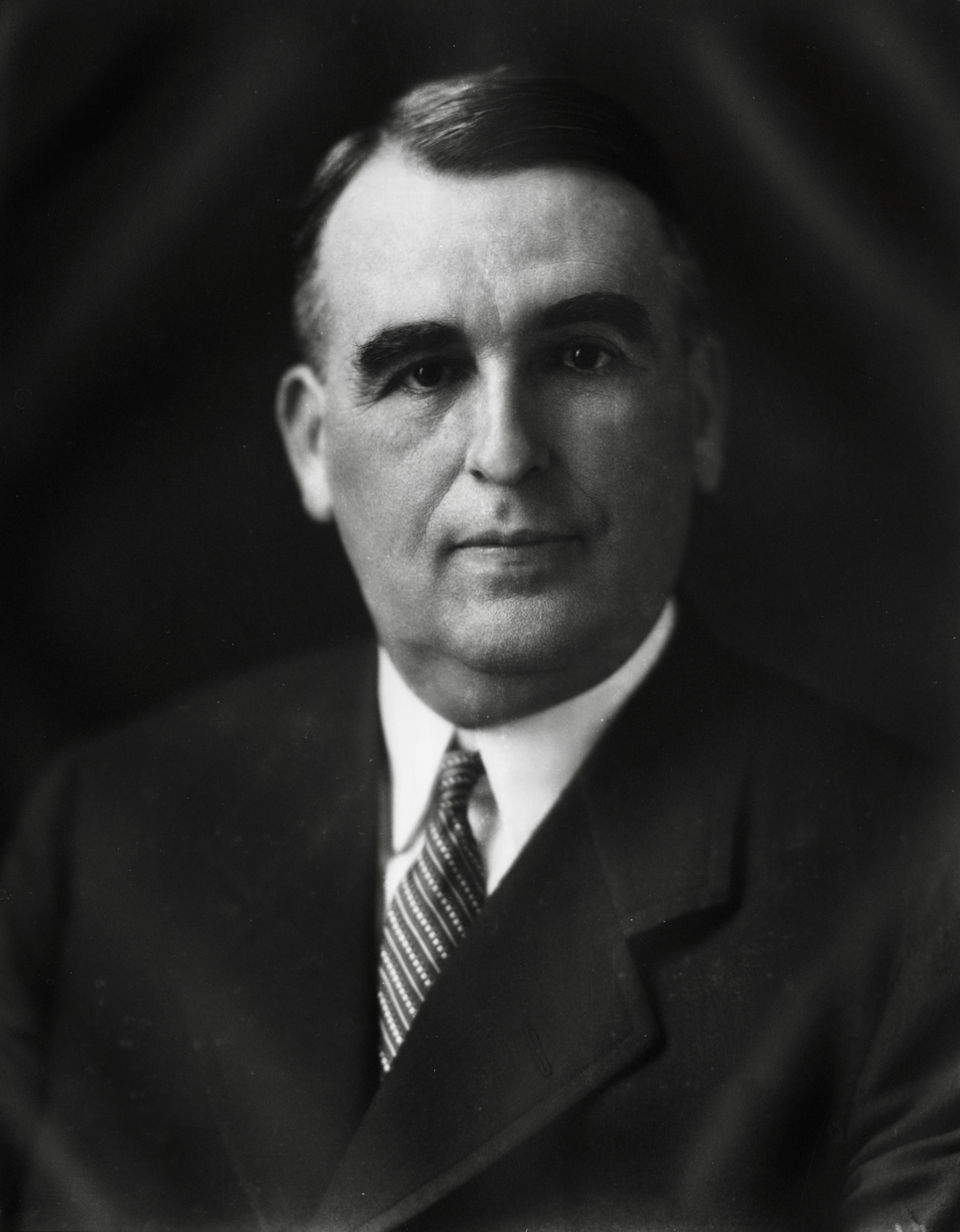
| Nominee | Theodore Bilbo | Hugh White |
| Party | Democratic | Democratic |
| Popular vote | 91,334 | 62,641 |
| Percentage | 59.32% | 40.68% |
- County results Bilbo: 50–60% 60–70% 70–80% 80–90% White: 50–60% 60–70% 70–80% Tie: 50%
U.S. senator before election
Theodore Bilbo
Democratic
Elected U.S. Senator
Theodore Bilbo
Democratic

The 1940 United States Senate election in Mississippi was held on November 6, 1940. Incumbent Senator Theodore Bilbo was re-elected to a second term.

On August 27, Bilbo won the Democratic primary election over Governor Hugh L. White with 59.32% of the vote. Bilbo won the November general election without an opponent.

== Democratic primary ==
=== Candidates ===
- Theodore Bilbo, incumbent Senator
- Hugh L. White, Governor of Mississippi

=== Results ===
1940 United States Senate Democratic primary
| Party | Candidate | Votes | % |
|---|---|---|---|
| Democratic | Theodore Bilbo (incumbent) | 91,334 | 59.32% |
| Democratic | Hugh L. White | 62,641 | 40.68% |
| Total votes | | 153,975 | 100.00% |

== General election ==
=== Results ===
1940 United States Senate election
| Party | Candidate | Votes | % | ±% |
|---|---|---|---|---|
| Democratic | Theodore Bilbo (incumbent) | 143,333 | 100.00% | Steady |
| Total votes | | 143,333 | 100.00% | |
