= Mark Perrin Lowrey Love =

American politician

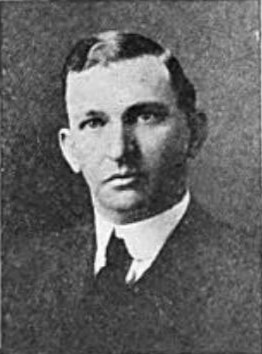
- c. 1923

President pro tempore of the Mississippi State Senate
- In office January 1924 – January 1928
- Preceded by: Fred B. Smith
- Succeeded by: Homer Casteel

Member of the Mississippi State Senate from the 42nd district
- In office January 1920 – January 1928

Personal details
- Born: November 8, 1881 Brooksville, Mississippi, U.S.
- Died: March 9, 1953 (aged 71) Jackson, Mississippi, U.S.
- Party: Democratic

Mark Perrin Lowrey Love Sr. (November 8, 1881 - March 9, 1953) was a Baptist official and state legislator in Mississippi. He was a Democrat and a Baptist. He married and had six children.

He was born in Brooksville, Mississippi. He attended Mississippi College.

He lived in Hattiesburg. He represented the 42nd District in the Mississippi State Senate from 1920 to 1928. He was the Senate's President Pro Tempore from 1924 to 1928. In 1927 he was a candidate for Lieutenant Governor but lost to Bidwell Adam.

He died in Jackson, Mississippi, on March 9, 1953.
