= Lieutenant Governor of Mississippi =

Statewide vice-executive officer of the U.S. state of Mississippi

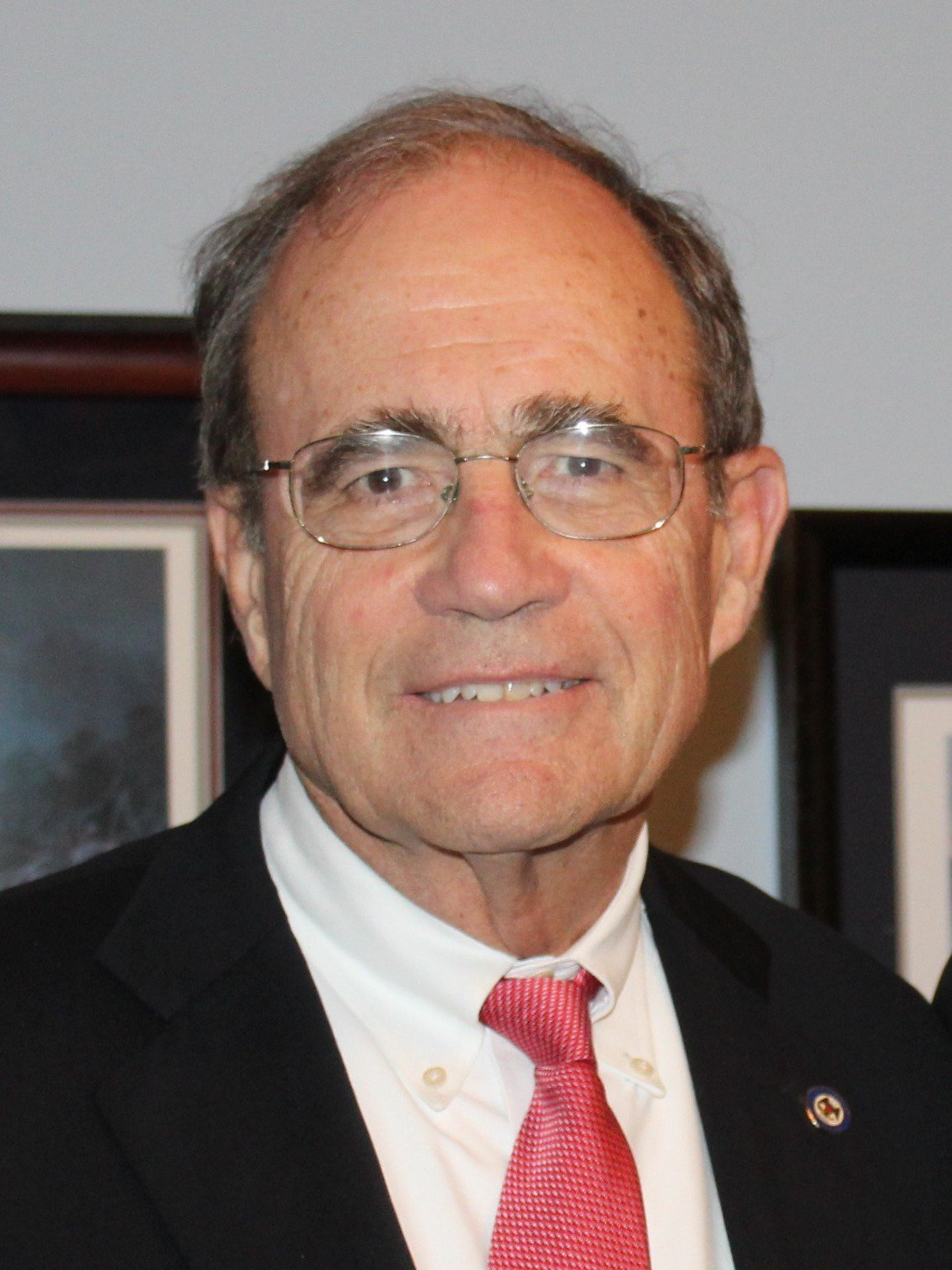
- Incumbent; Delbert Hosemann since January 9, 2020
- Type: Lieutenant Governor
- Term length: Four years, renewable once consecutively
- Succession: First
- Salary: $60,000
- Website: www.ltgov.ms.gov

The lieutenant governor of Mississippi is the second-highest ranking elected executive officer in the U.S. state of Mississippi, below the governor of Mississippi, and is the only official in the state to be a member of two branches of state government. The office of lieutenant governor was established when Mississippi became a state in 1817, abolished for a few decades in the first half of the 19th century, and restored later in the century. The lieutenant governor serves a four-year term with a two consecutive term limit. The current lieutenant governor is Delbert Hosemann, a Republican, who has held the office since 2020.

The lieutenant governor is constitutionally ex officio President of the Mississippi State Senate. As such, they rule on points of order, sign all passed bills, and can cast tie-breaking votes in the body. They are empowered by Senate rules to determine the composition of its committees and refer bills to them. Lieutenant governors have used this power to exert wide influence over the progress of legislation. In the event of a temporary or permanent vacancy in the governorship, the lieutenant governor assumes the higher office's responsibilities as acting governor.

== History ==
The office of lieutenant governor of Mississippi was established by the state's 1817 constitution and it and the governorship were the only popularly elected statewide positions at the time, with both serving two-year terms. The first lieutenant governor was Duncan Stewart, who took office on October 7, 1817. The role was eliminated in the 1832 constitution and replaced with a President of the Senate chosen by the body's own members. It was reintroduced in the 1869 constitution and absorbed the responsibilities of presiding over the Senate, with the holder serving a term of four years. During the Reconstruction era in the early 1870s, Alexander Kelso Davis served as one of the first black lieutenant governors in the country. Evelyn Gandy, who served as lieutenant governor from 1976 to 1980, was the first woman to hold the office in the state and in the Southern United States. Brad Dye, who held the office over three terms from 1980 to 1992, was the state's longest-serving lieutenant governor. Unlike previous holders of the office, he used his appointment power in the Mississippi Senate to strategically place his allies on committees to advance his own political goals.

In January 1986, two state senators sued the lieutenant governor, challenging the legality of his legislative prerogatives on the grounds that they violated the separation of powers language in the state constitution. The case escalated to the Mississippi Supreme Court, which ruled in 1987 that the Senate could award significant legislative powers to the official at its wish. One justice dissented, arguing that the ruling made the lieutenant governor "a powerful legislative creature, a super-senator, vested with sufficient legislative authority to virtually dominate the entire Senate." Following a reduction in the powers of the speaker of the Mississippi House of Representatives that year, a group of senators unsuccessfully attempted to strip the lieutenant governor of their power to appoint committees and refer bills to them. In 1992 the constitution was amended to limit the office holder to serving two consecutive terms. Following the assumption of office of Republican Phil Bryant in 2007, several Democrats in the Senate considered restricting his position's powers, but ultimately did not follow through on their proposals. The incumbent lieutenant governor, Delbert Hosemann, was sworn-in to the office on January 9, 2020.

== Election ==
Like the seats in the Mississippi State Legislature and the other seven statewide-elected offices, the Mississippi lieutenant governor is popularly elected every four years in the November preceding a United States presidential election year. The lieutenant governor is elected independently of the governor and candidates' qualifications for the former office are the same as for the latter. They serve a four-year term and are limited to serving two consecutive terms in office, with no limits on nonconsecutive terms.

== Powers, duties, and structure ==
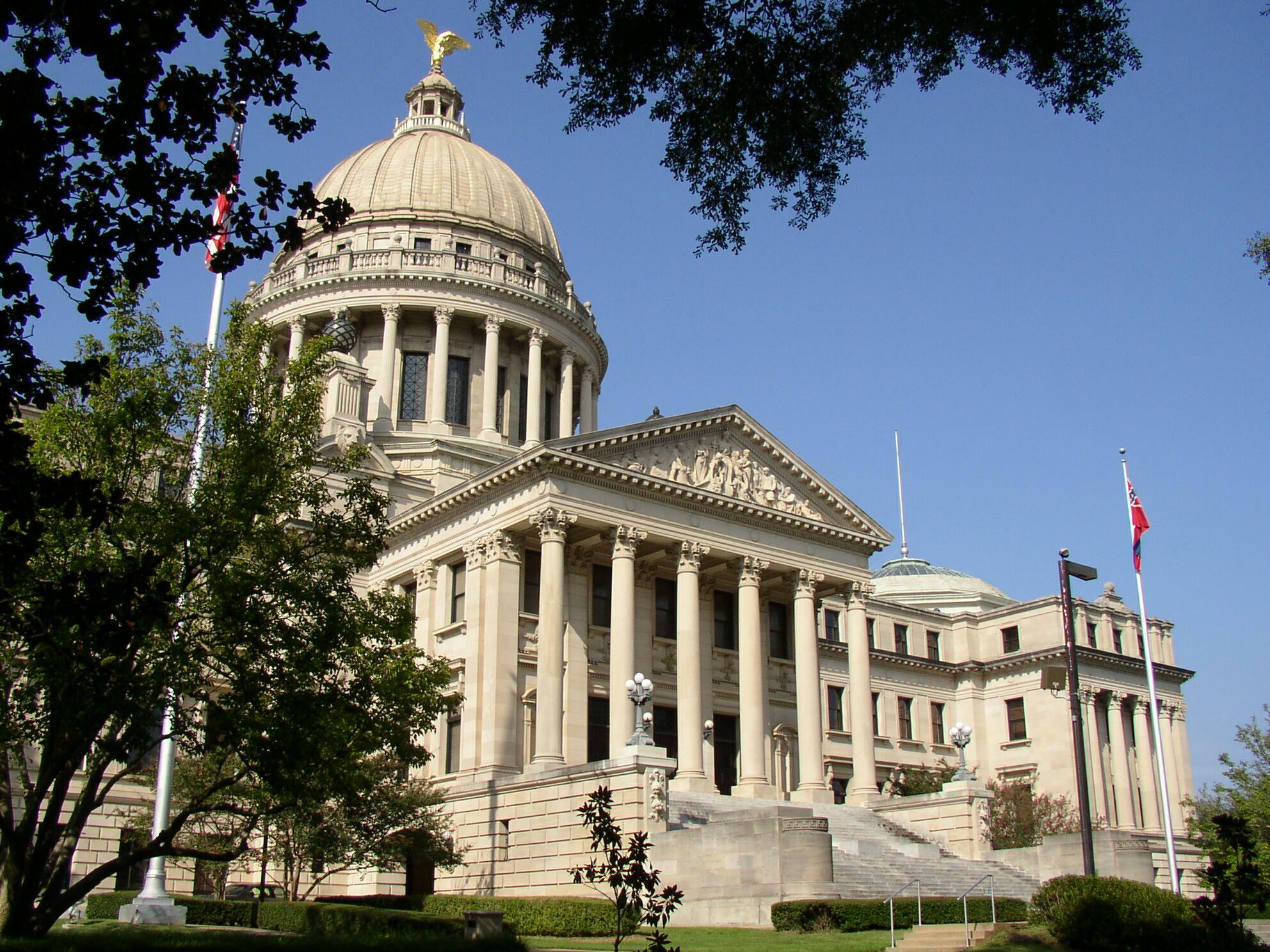
The lieutenant governor keeps an office in the Mississippi State Capitol.

Political scientists often describe Mississippi's lieutenant governor as one of the most powerful such officers in the country. The lieutenant governor is the only official in Mississippi to be a member of two branches of state government, legislative and executive; the Mississippi Supreme Court has ruled this state of affairs an exception to Mississippi's general separation of powers doctrine. They are constitutionally ex officio President of the Senate, while the Senate empowers the lieutenant governor through its rules to determine the composition of its committees and refer bills to them. Historically, the lieutenant governor has determined the composition of all Senate committees except the Rules Committee, of which they are a member. As the Mississippi Senate has no seniority system, lieutenant governors are relatively unrestricted in appointing committees that suit their personal policy preferences. As a result of their powers over committee composition and bill referrals, the official can wield wide authority over the progress of legislation in the Senate; historically, lieutenant governors have enjoyed the ability to pass most bills they favor through the Senate and block most they dislike.

The constitution empowers the lieutenant governor to participate in legislative debates and to cast tie-breaking votes both in the Senate and in joint resolutions of both houses of the State Legislature. As presiding officer in the Senate, they rule on points of order, sign all passed bills, and are entitled to serve on the Joint Legislative Budget Committee. They are also empowered to appoint two of the members of the Mississippi Board of Education. In the event the incumbent governor of Mississippi dies, is incapacitated, or leaves the state, the lieutenant governor assumes their responsibilities as acting governor. In the event the lieutenant governor is unavailable in the State Senate, the body's president pro tempore assumes their responsibilities there.

The lieutenant governor is constitutionally required to collect the same compensation as the speaker of the House. Their salary is $60,000 per year but is set to increase to $85,000 annually in 2024. If serving as acting governor, the lieutenant governor collects the same pay as the governor. They maintain an office on the third floor of the Mississippi State Capitol.

== Lieutenant governors and presidents of the Senate ==
Parties

No party Democratic Republican

=== Lieutenant governors (1817–1832) ===
Image	Lt. Governor	Term	Party	Source
	Duncan Stewart	1817–1820		
	James Patton	1820–1822		
	David Dickson	1822–1824		
	Gerard C. Brandon	1824–1826*		
	Abram M. Scott	1828–1832	Democrat	
	Fountain Winston	1832–1832		

=== Presidents of the Senate (1833–1869) ===
Image	Senate President	Term	Party	Source
	Charles Lynch	1833–1834	Democrat	
	Parmenas Briscoe	1834–1836	Democrat	
	William Van Norman	1836–1837		
	Alexander G. McNutt	1837–1838	Democrat	
	A. L. Bingaman	1838–1840		
	George B. Augustus	1840–1842		
	Jesse Speight	1842–1843	Democrat	
	A. Fox	1843–1844		
	Jesse Speight	1844–1846	Democrat	
	George T. Swann	1846–1848	Democrat	
	Dabney Lipscomb	1848–1850		
	John Isaac Guion	1850-1851	Democrat	
	James Whitfield	1852–1854	Democrat	
	John J. Pettus	1854–1858	Democrat	
	James Drane	1858–1865		
	John M. Simonton	1865–1869		

=== Lieutenant governors (1870–present) ===
Image	Lt. Governor	Term	Governor(s) served under	Party	Source
	Ridgley C. Powers	1870–1871	James L. Alcorn	Republican	
	Alexander K. Davis	1871–1876	Ridgley C. Powers; Adelbert Ames	Republican	
	John M. Stone	1876–1878	Adelbert Ames	Democrat	
	William H. Sims	1878–1882	John M. Stone	Democrat	
	G. D. Shands	1882–1890	Robert Lowry	Democrat	
	M. M. Evans	1890–1896	John M. Stone	Democrat	
	J. H. Jones	1896–1900	Anselm J. McLaurin	Democrat	
	James T. Harrison	1900–1904	Andrew H. Longino	Democrat	
	John Prentiss Carter	1904–1908	James K. Vardaman	Democrat	
	Luther Manship	1908–1912	Edmond Noel	Democrat	
	Theodore G. Bilbo	1912–1916	Earl L. Brewer	Democrat	
	Lee Maurice Russell	1916–1920	Theodore G. Bilbo	Democrat	
	Homer Casteel	1920–1924	Lee M. Russell	Democrat	
	Dennis Murphree	1924–1927	Henry L. Whitfield	Democrat	
	Bidwell Adam	1928–1932	Theodore G. Bilbo	Democrat	
	Dennis Murphree	1932–1936	Martin Sennet Conner	Democrat	
	Jacob Buehler Snider	1936–1940	Hugh L. White	Democrat	
	Dennis Murphree	1940–1943	Paul B. Johnson Sr.	Democrat	
	Fielding L. Wright	1944–1946	Thomas L. Bailey	Democrat	
	Sam Lumpkin	1948–1952	Fielding L. Wright	Democrat	
	Carroll Gartin	1952–1960	Hugh L. White; James P. Coleman	Democrat	
	Paul B. Johnson, Jr.	1960–1964	Ross Barnett	Democrat	
	Carroll Gartin	1964–1966	Paul B. Johnson Jr.	Democrat	
	Charles L. Sullivan	1968–1972	John Bell Williams	Democrat	
	William F. Winter	1972–1976	Bill Waller	Democrat	
	Evelyn Gandy	1976–1980	Cliff Finch	Democrat	
	Brad Dye	1980–1992	William Winter; William Allain; Ray Mabus	Democrat	
	Eddie Briggs	1992–1996	Kirk Fordice	Republican	
	Ronnie Musgrove	1996–2000	Kirk Fordice	Republican	
	Amy Tuck (Note: Tuck left the Democratic Party in December 2002 and joined the Republican Party.)	2000–2002	Ronnie Musgrove	Democrat	
	Amy Tuck	2002–2008	Ronnie Musgrove (Democratic) Haley Barbour (Republican)	Republican	
	Phil Bryant	2008–2012	Haley Barbour	Republican	
	Tate Reeves	2012–2020	Phil Bryant	Republican	
	Delbert Hosemann	2020–present	Tate Reeves	Republican	

== Works cited ==
- Bass, Jack (1995). The Transformation of Southern Politics: Social Change and Political Consequence Since 1945 (reprint ed.). University of Georgia Press. ISBN 9780820317281.
- Bullock, Charles S.; Rozell, Mark J., eds. (2010). The New Politics of the Old South: An Introduction to Southern Politics. Rowman & Littlefield. ISBN 9780742570214.
- Krane, Dale; Shaffer, Stephen D. (1992). Mississippi Government and Politics: Modernizers Versus Traditionalists. University of Nebraska Press. ISBN 9780803277588.
- Mississippi Official and Statistical Register 2016–2020. Jackson: Mississippi Secretary of State. 2017. OCLC 1045214160.
- Mississippi Official and Statistical Register 2020–2024. Jackson: Mississippi Secretary of State. 2021. OCLC 1353823876.
- Nash, Jere; Taggart, Andy (2009). Mississippi Politics: The Struggle for Power, 1976-2008 (second ed.). University Press of Mississippi. ISBN 9781604733570.
- Rowland, Dunbar, ed. (1904). The Official and Statistical Register of the State of Mississippi. Jackson: Mississippi Department of Archives and History. OCLC 777030828.
- Winkle, John W. III (2014). The Mississippi State Constitution (second ed.). Oxford University Press. ISBN 9780199300631.
