= Thomas W. Harvey =

Thomas Watson Harvey (November 27, 1893 – June 27, 1978) was President-General of the Universal Negro Improvement Association and African Communities League (UNIA) from 1956 to 1978.

== Biography ==
Harvey was born in Douglas, Burke County, Georgia, the oldest of twelve children of Walker and Billie Harvey. His father was a farmer and both his grandparents were slaves. He was named after Thomas E. Watson, the leader of the Populist Party in Georgia who at the time was a champion of Georgia's dispossessed, both black and white.

Harvey left Douglas as a young man seeking employment. His travels led him to Waynesboro, Augusta, Atlanta and other towns in the rural area. He became increasingly agitated as he became aware of his plight of black Americans, and he travelled north in search of a better life. He arrived in Philadelphia in 1917 at the age of 22. In 1919 he was discharged from the U.S. Army. Soon afterwards he became involved with the UNIA and its founder, Marcus Garvey, and became one of the thirteen students taught by Garvey in the School of African philosophy.

He joined the Association in 1919 and became very active, rising from ordinary membership to the successive positions of lieutenant of the African Legions, commissioner of the State of New York, Commissioner of the State of Ohio, High Chancellor of the Parent Body (when the Parent Body was located in London, England), Confidante of Mr. Garvey, and division president. In 1938 he distanced himself from Senator Theodore Bilbo, following the latter's use of racist invective in promoting the repatriation of African Americans under the age of 40 as an amendment to the House Joint Resolution 679.

Finally, Harvey was elected President-General of the UNIA Rehabilitating Committee in Detroit in 1951. Shortly afterwards he established the Garvey's Voice newspaper. He was elected again to the post again in 1960, and was re-elected every four years until his death; his many years of service often included minor tasks such as painting a room, sweeping or preparing meals for visitors. He was known as a peacemaker, and as a spokesman who believed staunchly in Garvey's philosophy and opinions.

The rest of his association with the UNIA can be documented by members of the organization who knew him well. In his travels from Georgia to various cities, the Senate Chamber, university campuses, and offices of foreign and domestic government officials, he touched the lives of many people. He was renowned for his patience with and commitment to his fellow men.

One of the highpoints of Harvey's career was the creation and founding of the African Project in 1966 under the leadership of the late Reverend Clarence Harding, Jr. The project was located in Monrovia, Liberia, and included a fully accredited school under the Garvey Memorial Foundation, headed by the minister of education.

Harvey died in 1978 at the home of his daughter, Jean Slappy of Philadelphia. He was 84 years old. His funeral took place at Antioch Second Baptist Church, and he was interred at Mount Lawn Cemetery, Sharon Hill, Pennsylvania.
