= Lester C. Franklin =

American lawyer and politician

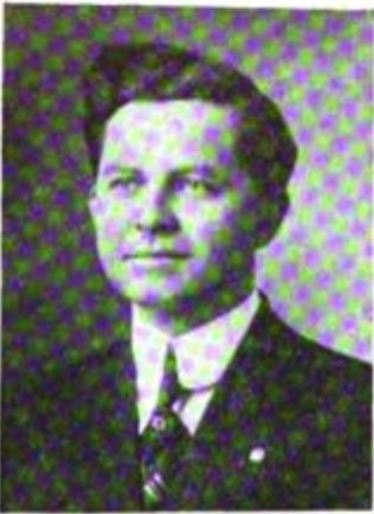
- c. 1917

Member of the Mississippi State Senate from the 34th district
- In office January 1916 – January 1920

Personal details
- Born: July 28, 1886 Eupora, Mississippi, U.S.
- Died: February 18, 1953 (aged 66) Jackson, Mississippi, U.S.
- Party: Democratic

Lester Cicero Franklin (July 28, 1886 - February 18, 1953) was an American lawyer and Democratic politician. He was a member of the Mississippi State Senate, from the 34th district, from 1916 to 1920.

== Early life ==
Lester Cicero Franklin was born on July 28, 1886, in Eupora, Mississippi. He was the son of Cicero Howard Franklin and Mary (Riddle) Franklin. Franklin attended the public schools of Choctaw County, Mississippi, and graduated from Bennett Academy with literary and oratory honors. Franklin then graduated from Mississippi College in 1910. He then went to Cumberland University and graduated with a L. L. B. in 1911. The next year, he took a law course at Millsaps College under A. H. Whitfield, a Justice of the Supreme Court of Mississippi. He then moved to Clarksdale, Mississippi, where he began practicing law.

== Professional career ==
In November 1915, Franklin was elected to represent the 34th District as a Democrat in the Mississippi State Senate for the 1916-1920 term. In 1920, Franklin was appointed to the office of President of the Mississippi Yazoo Delta Levee Board, which dealt with flood control. Franklin ran for the office of Governor of Mississippi for the first time in 1923, and was unsuccessful. He became the Chairman of the Mississippi State Tax Commission in 1927. Franklin ran again for the Mississippi governorship in 1935, 1939, and 1943, but lost each time.

== Personal life ==
Franklin was a member of the Baptist Church, and was a Freemason, Woodman of the World, Knight of Pythias, and member of the Order of Owls. He married Eulalie Frances Rogers in 1911, and they had two sons, named Lester Cicero Jr. and Benjamin Rogers. Franklin died on the morning of February 18, 1953, at his home in Jackson, Mississippi.
