= Lee M. Russell =

American politician (1875–1943)

Lee Maurice Russell
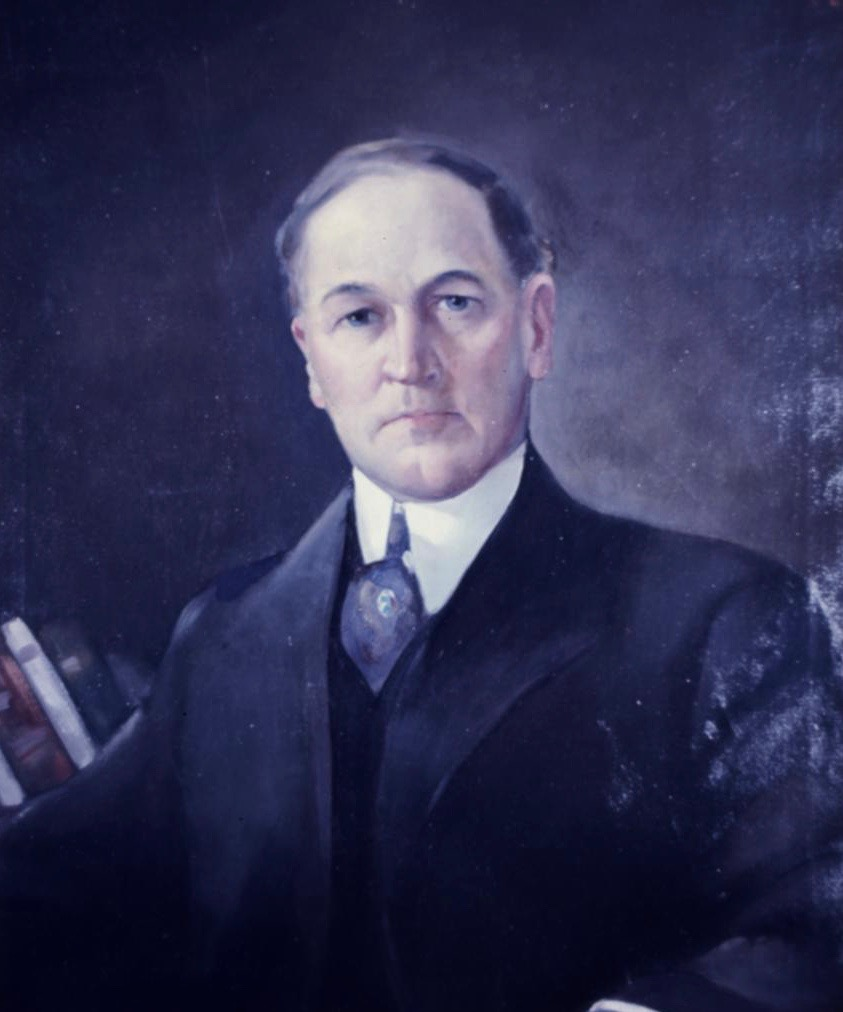

40th Governor of Mississippi
- In office January 20, 1920 – January 22, 1924
- Lieutenant: Homer H. Casteel
- Preceded by: Theodore G. Bilbo
- Succeeded by: Henry L. Whitfield

18th Lieutenant Governor of Mississippi
- In office January 18, 1916 – January 20, 1920
- Governor: Theodore G. Bilbo
- Preceded by: Theodore G. Bilbo
- Succeeded by: Homer H. Casteel

Member of the Mississippi State Senate from the 32nd district
- In office January 1912 – January 1916
- Preceded by: Robert Aaron Dean
- Succeeded by: James C. Eskridge

Member of the Mississippi House of Representatives from the Lafayette County district
- In office January 1908 – January 1912

Personal details
- Born: November 16, 1875 Lafayette County, Mississippi, U.S.
- Died: May 16, 1943 (aged 67) Jackson, Mississippi, U.S.
- Party: Democratic
- Spouse: Ethel May Day
- Profession: Lawyer

Lee Maurice Russell (November 16, 1875 – May 16, 1943) was an American politician from Mississippi.

He was born in Lafayette County, Mississippi, to William Eaton Russell and Louisa Jane (Mackey) Russell, and he later attended the University of Mississippi. During his time as a student, he was the leader in a movement to abolish Greek fraternities. Russell graduated from the university in 1901 and enrolled in the University of Mississippi School of Law. After completing the course, he was admitted to the bar and practiced law in Oxford, Mississippi.

Russell was elected to the Mississippi House of Representatives in 1907, representing Lafayette County from 1908 to 1912, and he was elected to the Mississippi State Senate in 1911, representing the 32nd district from 1912 to 1916. In 1912, he successfully passed a bill prohibiting secret and exclusive societies at the public institutions of higher learning. The law stayed on the books for twelve years.

Russell was elected to the office of lieutenant governor in 1915 and elected governor in 1919. Crop failures due to the boll weevil marked his term. Russell also filed an antitrust suit against several fire insurance companies for their business practices.

In terms of social reform Russell's time as governor was a progressive one. As noted by one historian, “Although Governor Russell was not as successful as previous governors in getting many of his major proposals enacted, the legislature's appropriations for educational and welfare purposes during his tenure set new records.” Higher state funding was provided for a TB sanitarium, an institution to house and treat mentally ill persons, charity hospitals (which included the approval of 3 new ones), and public schools and colleges. Constitutional amendments also provided for pensions for Confederate veterans or their widows, authorized a $2 poll tax on both men and women for education purposes, and a school year of at least 4 months. A number of labor laws were also introduced.

In 1923, he was sued for seduction and breach of promise by his former secretary Frances Birkhead. Russell was acquitted, and he blamed the lawsuit on the fire insurance industry.

Russell could not run for re-election due to the term limits in the Mississippi constitution. He retired to the Gulf Coast of Mississippi. There he sold real estate for a period before returning to Jackson to practice law until his death on May 16, 1943. He is buried at Lakewood Memorial Park in Jackson.

Party political offices
Preceded by Theodore G. Bilbo	Democratic nominee for Governor of Mississippi; 1919	Succeeded by Henry L. Whitfield
Political offices
Preceded by Theodore G. Bilbo	Lieutenant Governor of Mississippi; 1916–1920	Succeeded by Homer H. Casteel
Preceded by Theodore G. Bilbo	Governor of Mississippi; 1920–1924	Succeeded by Henry L. Whitfield
