= 1946 United States Senate election in Mississippi =

1946 U.S. Senate Democratic primary in Mississippi
- July 2, 1946
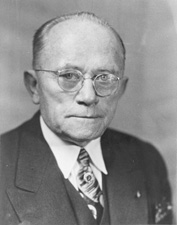

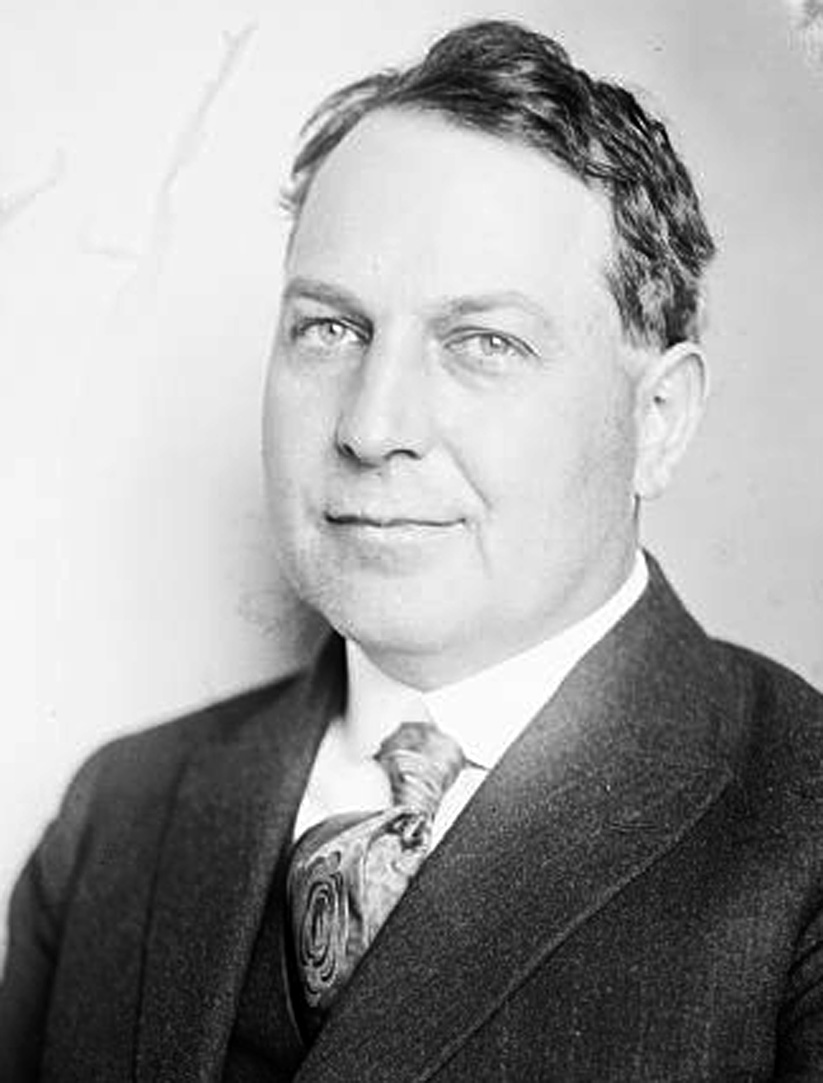

Nominee	Theodore G. Bilbo	Tom Ellis
Party	Democratic	Democratic
Popular vote	97,820	58,005
Percentage	51.00%	30.24%
Nominee	Ross A. Collins	Nelson T. Levings
Party	Democratic	Democratic
Popular vote	18,875	15,720
Percentage	9.84%	8.20%
- County results Bilbo: 30–40% 40–50% 50–60% 60–70% 70–80% 80–90% Ellis: 40–50% 50–60% 60–70%
U.S. senator before election
Theodore G. Bilbo
Democratic
Elected U.S. Senator
Theodore G. Bilbo
Democratic

The 1946 United States Senate election in Mississippi was held on November 3, 1946. Incumbent Democratic U.S. Senator Theodore G. Bilbo won re-election to his third term.

Because Bilbo was unopposed in the general election, his victory in the July 2 primary was tantamount to election. He defeated a field of candidates with 51% of the vote.

However, the United States Senate, with a Republican majority and at the request of liberal Democratic Senator Glen H. Taylor of Idaho, refused to seat Bilbo based on his adamant opposition to voting rights for black Americans anywhere in the country, incitement of violence against those blacks who tried to vote, and history of accepting bribes. While his re-entry to the Senate was being contested in 1947, Bilbo died of oral cancer.

== Democratic primary ==
=== Candidates ===
- Theodore G. Bilbo, incumbent Senator since 1935
- Ross A. Collins, former U.S. Representative from Meridian and candidate for Senate in 1934
- Tom Ellis, clerk of the Mississippi Supreme Court
- Frank "Peachtree" Harper, hitchhiker, folk hero, and former state legislator from Hattiesburg
- Nelson T. Levings, investment banker and Navy Lieutenant Commander during World War II

==== Withdrew ====
- Douglas Smith, landscaper and greenhouse operator from Jackson

=== Results ===
1946 Democratic U.S. Senate primary
Party	Candidate	Votes	%
Democratic	Theodore G. Bilbo (incumbent)	97,820	51.00%
Democratic	Tom Ellis	58,005	30.24%
Democratic	Ross A. Collins	18,875	9.84%
Democratic	Nelson T. Levings	15,720	8.20%
Democratic	Frank H. Harper	1,386	0.72%
Total votes		191,806	100.00%

== General election ==
=== Results ===
1946 U.S. Senate election in Mississippi
Party	Candidate	Votes	%	±%
Democratic	Theodore G. Bilbo (incumbent)	46,747	100.00%	Steady
Total votes		46,747	100.00%	

== See also ==
- 1946 United States Senate elections
