= 1923 Mississippi gubernatorial election =

1923 Mississippi Democratic gubernatorial primary runoff
- November 6, 1923
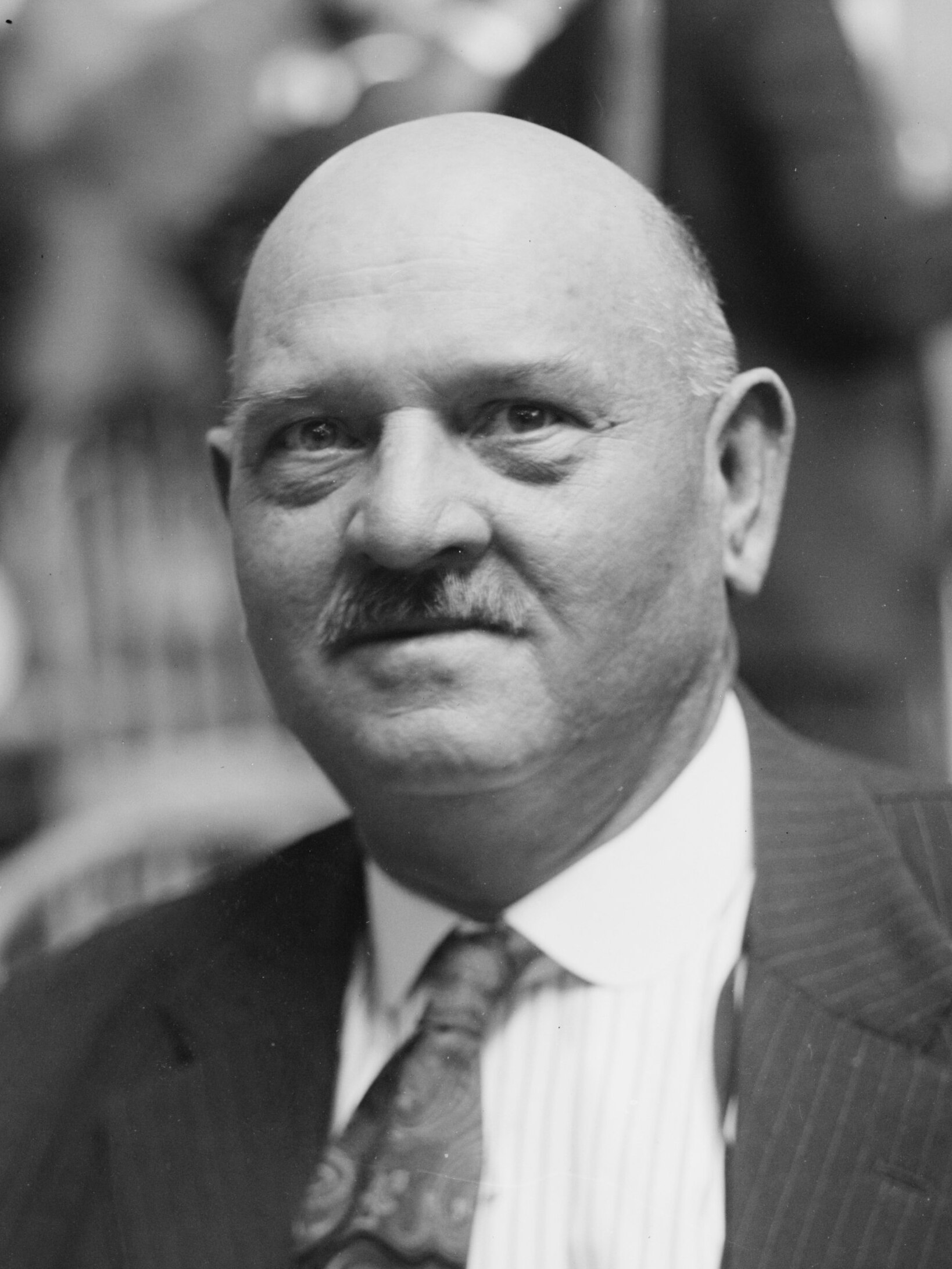

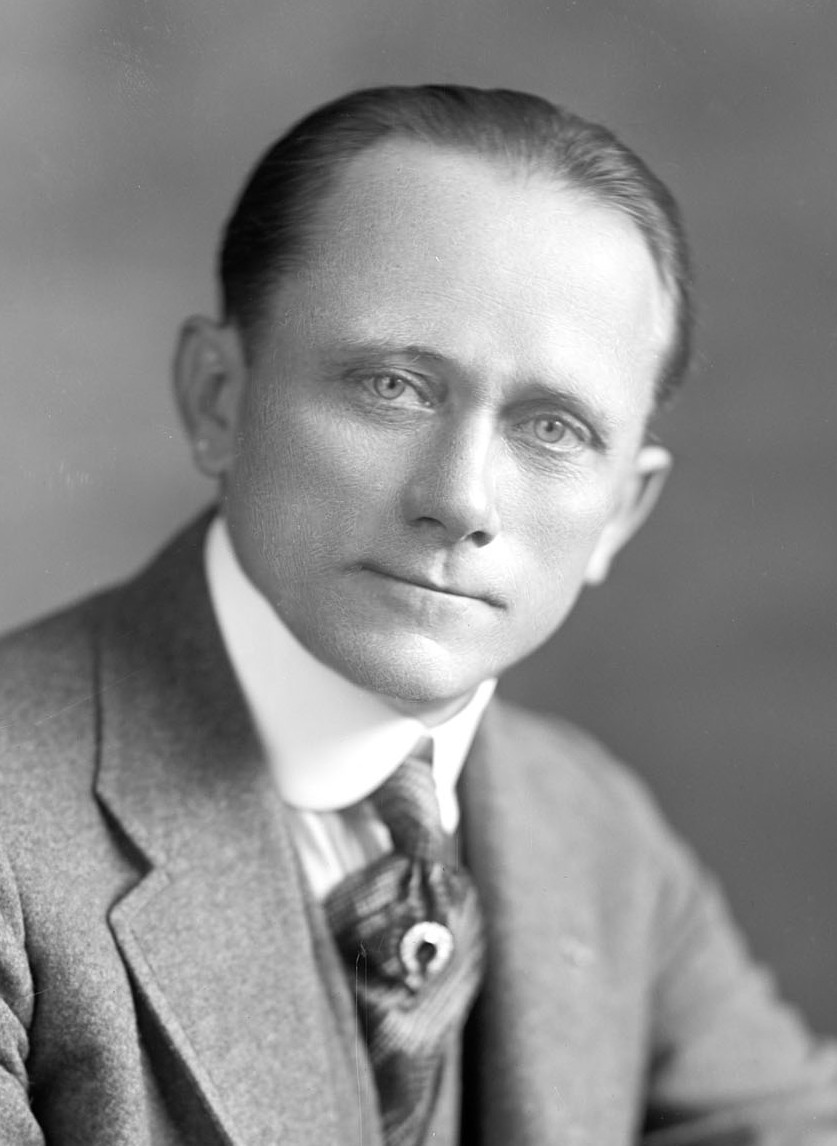
| Nominee | Henry L. Whitfield | Theodore G. Bilbo |
| Party | Democratic | Democratic |
| Popular vote | 134,715 | 118,143 |
| Percentage | 53.28% | 46.72% |
- County results Whitfield: 50–60% 60–70% 70–80% 80–90% Bilbo: 50–60% 60–70% 70–80%
Governor before election
Lee M. Russell
Democratic
Elected Governor
Henry L. Whitfield
Democratic

The 1923 Mississippi gubernatorial election took place on November 6, 1923, in order to elect the Governor of Mississippi. Incumbent Democrat Lee M. Russell was term-limited, and could not run for reelection to a second term. As was common at the time, the Democratic candidate ran unopposed in the general election so therefore the Democratic primary was the real contest, and winning the primary was considered tantamount to election.

This gubernatorial election was the first in Mississippi that allowed women the right to vote.

== Democratic primary ==
=== Candidates ===
- Percy Bell
- Theodore Bilbo, former Governor of Mississippi (1916–20)
- Martin S. Conner, State Representative from Covington County
- Lester C. Franklin, President of the Mississippi Yazoo Delta Levee Board and former State Senator from Clarksdale
- Henry L. Whitfield, president of the Mississippi State College for Women and former Mississippi Superintendent of Education

=== Results ===
No candidate received a majority in the Democratic primary, which featured 5 contenders, so a runoff was held between the top two candidates.

Mississippi Democratic gubernatorial primary, 1923
| Party | Candidate | Votes | % |
|---|---|---|---|
| Democratic | Henry L. Whitfield | 85,328 | 33.58 |
| Democratic | Theodore G. Bilbo | 65,105 | 25.62 |
| Democratic | Martin S. Conner | 48,739 | 19.18 |
| Democratic | Lester C. Franklin | 37,245 | 14.66 |
| Democratic | Percy Bell | 17,724 | 6.97 |
| Total votes | | 254,141 | 100.00 |

=== Runoff ===
The runoff election was won by former Superintendent of Education Henry L. Whitfield, who defeated former Governor Theodore G. Bilbo.

Mississippi Democratic gubernatorial primary runoff, 1923
| Party | Candidate | Votes | % |
|---|---|---|---|
| Democratic | Henry L. Whitfield | 134,715 | 53.28 |
| Democratic | Theodore G. Bilbo | 118,143 | 46.72 |
| Total votes | | 252,858 | 100.00 |

== General election ==
In the general election, Whitfield ran unopposed.

=== Results ===
Mississippi gubernatorial election, 1923
| Party | Candidate | Votes | % |
|---|---|---|---|
| Democratic | Henry L. Whitfield | 29,138 | 100.00 |
| Total votes | | 29,138 | 100.00 |
| Democratic hold | | | |
