= 1927 Mississippi gubernatorial election =

1927 Mississippi Democratic gubernatorial primary runoff
- November 8, 1927
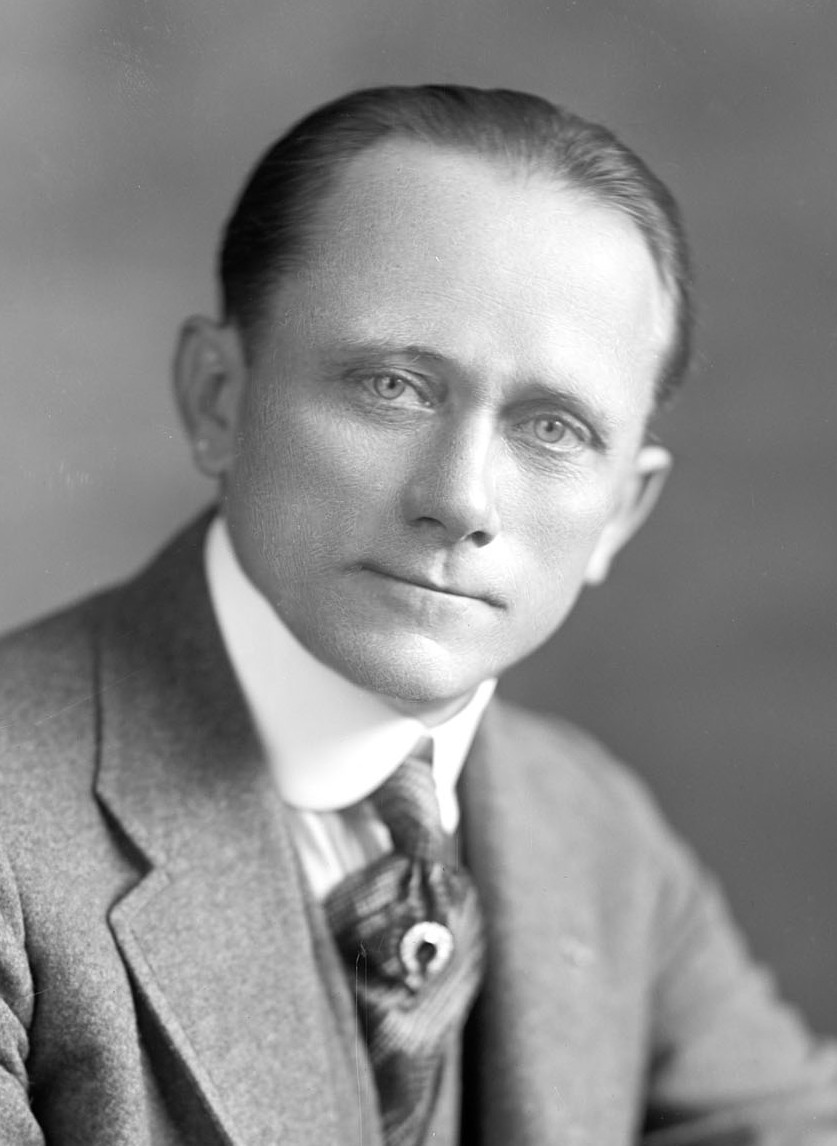

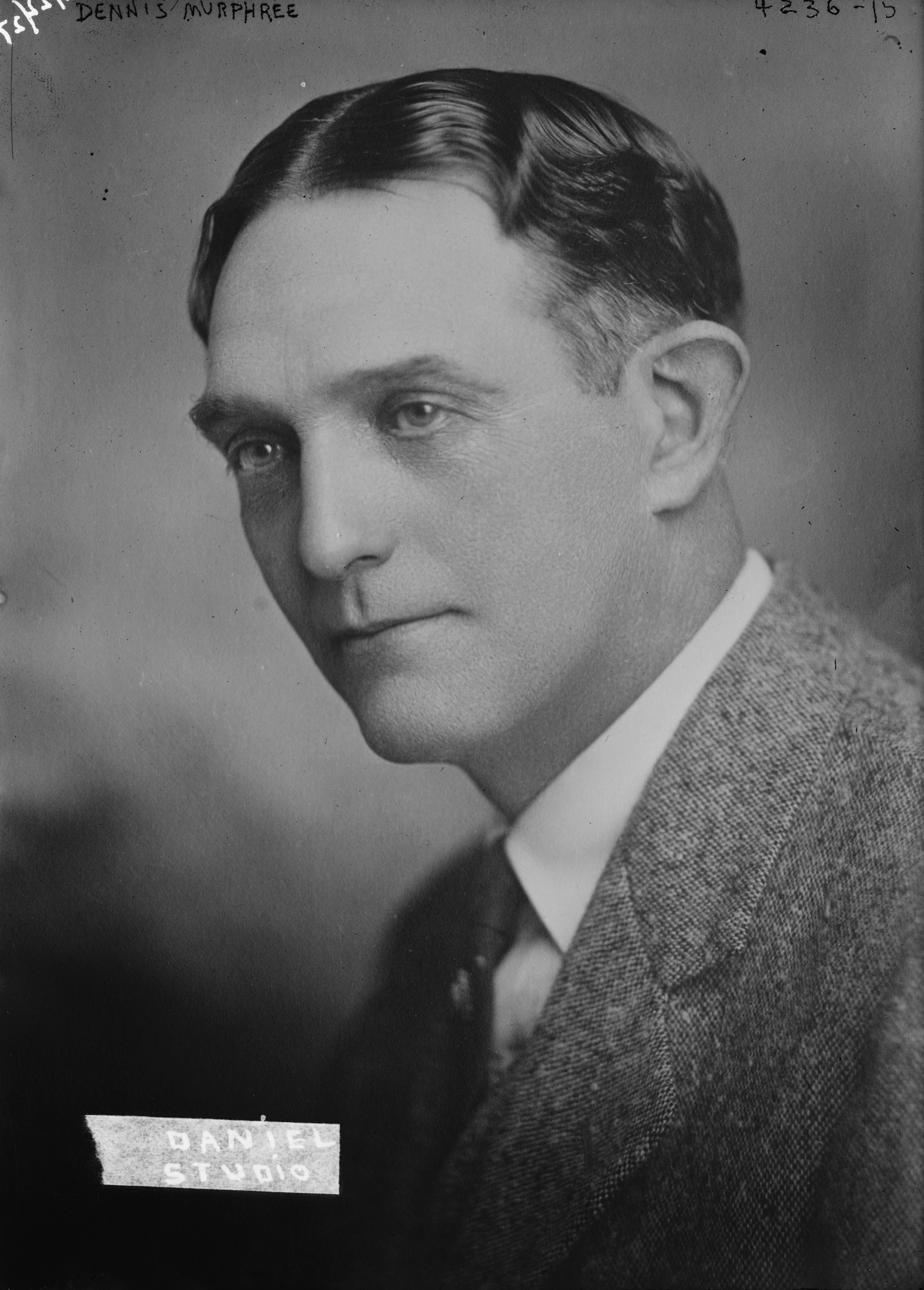
Nominee	Theodore G. Bilbo	Dennis Murphree
Party	Democratic	Democratic
Popular vote	153,669	137,130
Percentage	52.84%	47.16%
- Bilbo: 30–40% 40–50% 50–60% 60–70% 70–80% 80–90% 100% Murphree: 30–40% 40–50% 50–60% 60–70% Anderson: 40–50% 50–60% 70–80% Conner: 30–40% 40–50%
Governor before election
Dennis Murphree
Democratic
Elected Governor
Theodore G. Bilbo
Democratic

The 1927 Mississippi gubernatorial election took place on November 8, 1927, in order to elect the Governor of Mississippi. Incumbent Democrat Dennis Murphree, as he had not served a full term, was eligible for and ran for election. As was common at the time, the Democratic candidate ran unopposed in the general election; therefore the Democratic primary was the real contest, and winning the primary was considered tantamount to election.

== Democratic primary ==
No candidate received a majority in the Democratic primary, which featured four contenders, so a runoff was held between the top two candidates. The runoff election was won by former Governor Theodore G. Bilbo, who defeated incumbent Governor Dennis Murphree.

=== Results ===
Mississippi Democratic gubernatorial primary, 1927
Party	Candidate	Votes	%
Democratic	Theodore G. Bilbo	135,065	46.93
Democratic	Dennis Murphree (incumbent)	71,836	24.96
Democratic	Martin S. Conner	57,402	19.94
Democratic	A. C. Anderson	23,528	8.17
Total votes		287,831	100.00

=== Runoff ===
Mississippi Democratic gubernatorial primary runoff, 1927
Party	Candidate	Votes	%
Democratic	Theodore G. Bilbo	153,669	52.84
Democratic	Dennis Murphree (incumbent)	137,130	47.16
Total votes		290,799	100.00

== General election ==
In the general election, Bilbo ran unopposed.

=== Results ===
Mississippi gubernatorial election, 1927
Party	Candidate	Votes	%
Democratic	Theodore G. Bilbo	31,717	100.00
Total votes		31,717	100.00
Democratic hold			
