= Jacob Buehler Snider =

American politician

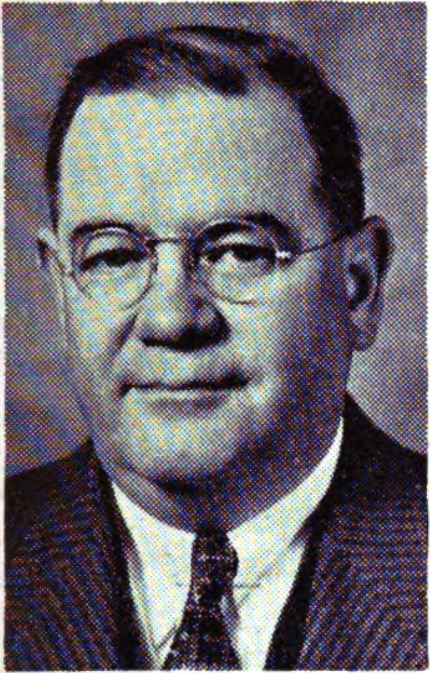

23rd Lieutenant Governor of Mississippi
- In office January 26, 1936 – January 16, 1940
- Governor: Hugh L. White
- Preceded by: Dennis Murphree
- Succeeded by: Dennis Murphree

Member of the Mississippi House of Representatives from the Tate County district
- In office January 1928 – January 1932

Personal details
- Born: June 17, 1886 Grenada, Mississippi, US
- Died: March 15, 1966 (aged 79) Pascagoula, Mississippi, US
- Party: Democratic
- Spouse: Annette

Military service
- Allegiance: United States
- Branch/service: United States Army
- Years of service: 1916–1918
- Rank: Private
- Battles/wars: World War I

Jacob Buehler Snider Jr. (June 17, 1886 – March 15, 1966) was an American politician from Mississippi. Snider served as Mississippi's 23rd Lieutenant Governor from 1936 to 1940 under Governor Hugh L. White.

== Biography ==
Jacob Buehler Snider, Jr. was born on June 17, 1886, in Grenada, Mississippi. He was the son of Jacob Buehler Snider Sr. (who was of German descent) and Susie Virginia Still, and had two sisters. Snider attended the public schools of Grenada. He entered the printing business in Memphis, Tennessee, in 1902. He then owned and printed newspapers in Arkansas, New Mexico, and Colorado, before returning to Mississippi in 1909. He was the managing editor of the Natchez News in 1912 and 1913. He then moved to Senatobia, Mississippi, where he "established a chain of nine newspapers in Mississippi and Tennessee".

He enlisted in the United States Army in World War I, and left for Camp Hancock on July 2, 1918. At Camp Hancock, Snider was commissioned a Captain after passing the Central Machine Gun officers' training school. He fought in the war until the armistice on November 11, and returned to Senatobia on December 23, 1918.

In 1924, Snider was elected mayor of Senatobia, Mississippi. During his tenure as mayor, he helped fix a monetary deficit in the municipal power and light plant. He resigned from his mayor office on January 1, 1928 as he then represented Tate County in the Mississippi House of Representatives from 1928 to 1932. During this term, Snider chaired the Municipalities Committee. From 1936 to 1940, Snider served as the Lieutenant Governor of Mississippi. In 1939, Snider unsuccessfully sought the Mississippi Democratic Party's nomination for Governor. He died on March 15, 1966, in Pascagoula, Mississippi.

== Personal life ==
Snider was raised as an Episcopalian but around 1914 became a Methodist due to there being no Episcopalian church in Senatobia. Snider married Annette Foster on July 4, 1917. They had one daughter, who married Hugh Oliver.

Political offices
| Preceded by Dennis Murphree | Lieutenant Governor of Mississippi; 1936–1940 | Succeeded by Dennis Murphree |
