= Theodore G. Bilbo =

American politician (1877–1947)

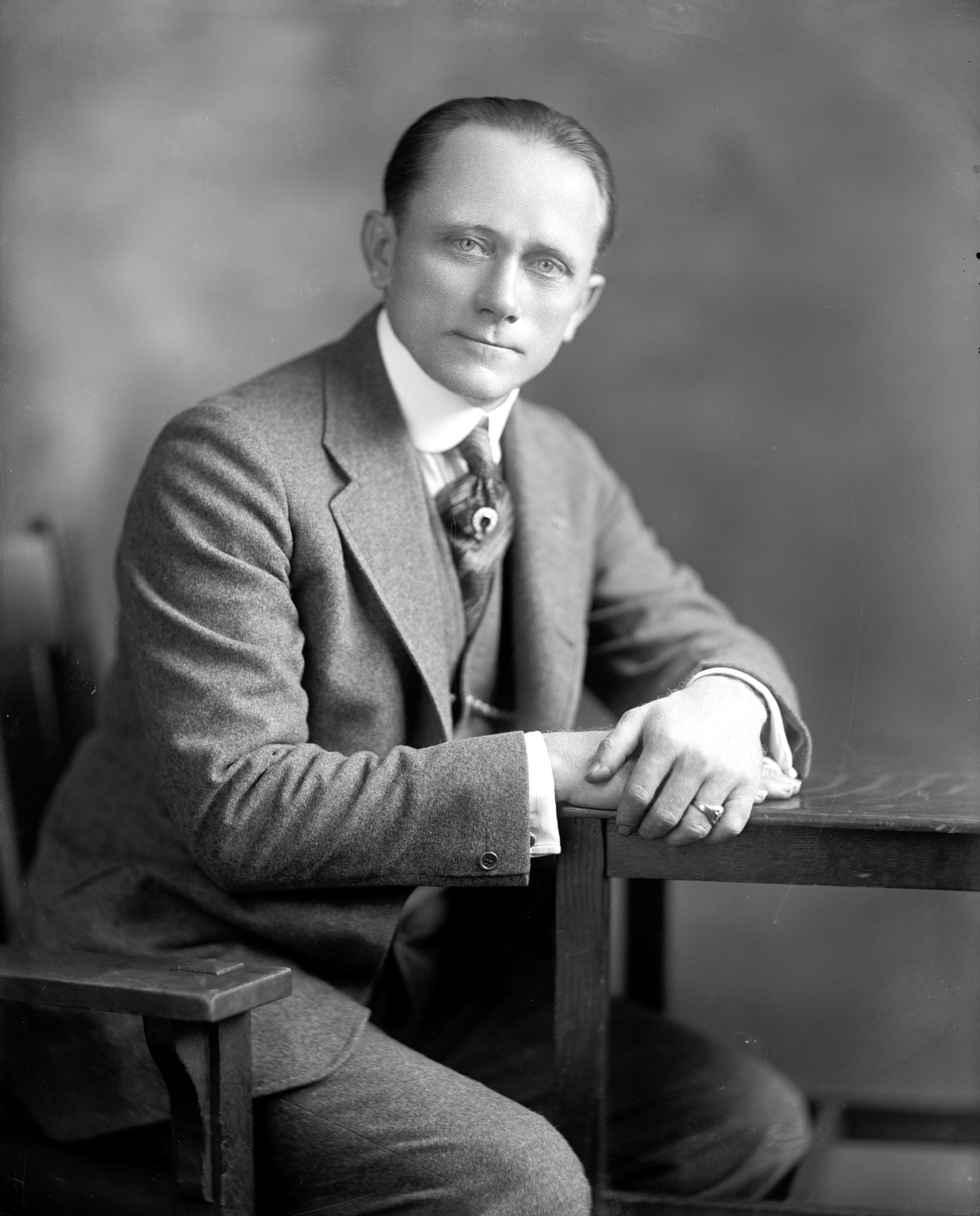

United States Senator from Mississippi
- In office January 3, 1935 – August 21, 1947
- Preceded by: Hubert D. Stephens
- Succeeded by: John C. Stennis

39th and 43rd Governor of Mississippi
- In office January 17, 1928 – January 19, 1932
- Lieutenant: Cayton B. Adam
- Preceded by: Dennis Murphree
- Succeeded by: Martin Sennett Conner
- In office January 18, 1916 – January 20, 1920
- Lieutenant: Lee M. Russell
- Preceded by: Earl L. Brewer
- Succeeded by: Lee M. Russell

11th Lieutenant Governor of Mississippi
- In office January 16, 1912 – January 18, 1916
- Governor: Earl L. Brewer
- Preceded by: Luther Manship
- Succeeded by: Lee M. Russell

Member of the Mississippi Senate from the 4th district
- In office January 7, 1908 – January 4, 1912
- Preceded by: Henry Mounger
- Succeeded by: Milton U. Mounger

Personal details
- Born: Theodore Gilmore Bilbo; October 13, 1877 Juniper Grove, Mississippi, U.S.
- Died: August 21, 1947 (aged 69) New Orleans, Louisiana, U.S.
- Resting place: Juniper Grove Cemetery, Poplarville, Mississippi, U.S.
- Party: Democratic
- Spouse(s): Lillian Selita Herrington (m. 1898; died 1899) Lida Ruth Gaddy
- Education: Peabody College; Vanderbilt University; University of Michigan Law School
- Profession: Attorney

Theodore Gilmore Bilbo (October 13, 1877 – August 21, 1947) was an American attorney and Democratic Party politician from Mississippi who served as the 39th and 43rd governor of Mississippi from 1916 to 1920 and 1928 to 1932, and represented the state in the United States Senate from 1935 to 1947. Bilbo was a populist, demagogue, and filibusterer whose name was synonymous during his own lifetime with white supremacy and racist extremism. He died of cancer in the midst of an extended controversy over his Senate credentials and accusations that he had accepted bribes and encouraged violence to prevent black Mississippians from voting against him in 1946.

Bilbo was born in Pearl River County, Mississippi and educated in rural schools. He attended Peabody Normal College and Vanderbilt University Law School. Though he did not graduate from either school, he opened a law practice in Poplarville in 1907 and entered politics, serving in the Mississippi State Senate from 1908 to 1912. Bilbo supported white supremacy and segregation and was a member of the second Ku Klux Klan during the 1920s.

Despite accusations that he had accepted bribes as a senator, Bilbo was elected lieutenant governor in 1911. He was elected governor for the first time in 1915. During his first term from 1915 to 1919, he enacted a number of progressive measures, such as compulsory education and increased spending on public works. After several unsuccessful campaigns for other offices, multiple sex scandals, and a prison term for contempt of court, Bilbo was elected governor again in 1927. During his second term term, Bilbo proposed the first state sales tax in the United States in 1930 and controversially attempted to move the University of Mississippi to Jackson.

In 1934, Bilbo won election to the United States Senate. He was re-elected in 1940. As a Senator, Bilbo maintained his support for segregation and white supremacy, as well as black separatism and relocation to Africa, making racism an increasing theme of his politics. Although he was elected as a supporter of the New Deal, his politics became increasingly conservative and opposed to President Franklin D. Roosevelt on issues other than race as well, as he opposed labor unions and internationalism and voted with the conservative coalition on some issues. He was the leading opponent to the creation of the Fair Employment Practice Committee and helped block the nomination of liberal Aubrey Willis Williams as Rural Electrification Administrator.

Although he was reelected to a third term in 1946, liberal Senators led by Glen H. Taylor blocked him from his seat on the basis of accusations that he had denied the vote to blacks through violence and voter intimidation and accepted bribes, and the national media made him a symbol of racism in the American South. Bilbo died in 1947 at a New Orleans hospital while undergoing cancer treatment, without rejoining the Senate, and was buried in Poplarville.

== Early life and education ==
Theodore Gilmore Bilbo was born on October 13, 1877, in the small town of Juniper Grove in Hancock County, Mississippi to Obedience "Beedy" (née Wallis or Wallace) and James Oliver Bilbo. His parents were Scotch-Irish. James was a farmer and veteran of the Confederate States Army who rose from poverty during Theodore Bilbo's early years to become vice president of Poplarville National Bank.

After attending rural schools, Theodore Bilbo obtained a scholarship to attend Peabody Normal College in Nashville, Tennessee, but he did not graduate. After leaving Peabody, he taught school and worked at a drug store. During his teaching career, Bilbo was accused of being overly familiar with a female student in Wiggins.

While teaching and working, he attended Vanderbilt University Law School, but he did not graduate there, either. He was accused of cheating in academics, but he likely left school for financial reasons. Though these accusations never rose to the level of formal charges, they helped create a perception of profligacy and dishonesty which political opponents would later seize upon.

He was admitted to the bar in Tennessee in 1906, and began a law practice in Poplarville, Mississippi in 1907. He continued his legal education after entering politics by attending non-credit summer courses at the University of Michigan Law School when the Mississippi legislature was not in session.

== Early political career ==
In 1903, Bilbo lost his first political campaign for Pearl River County circuit clerk to a "one-armed Confederate veteran" and Baptist preacher.

=== State senator (1908–12) and bribery scandal ===
On November 5, 1907, Bilbo was elected to the Mississippi State Senate. He served there from 1908 to 1912.

In 1910, Bilbo attracted national attention for a bribery scandal involving the election of a United States senator. After the death of Senator James Gordon, the legislature deadlocked between governor-elect LeRoy Percy or former governor James K. Vardaman for the seat. On February 28, after fifty-eight ballots, Bilbo was one of several legislators who broke the stalemate by switching from Vardaman to Percy. The next day, Bilbo told a grand jury that he had accepted a $645 bribe from Lorraine C. Dulaney but claimed that he had done so as part of a private investigation into corruption. The State Senate voted 28–10 to expel Bilbo from office, falling one vote short of the ^{3}/_{4} majority needed. The Senate passed a resolution – which did not require a ^{3}/_{4} majority – calling him "unfit to sit with honest, upright men in a respectable legislative body."

=== Lieutenant governor (1912–16) ===
In 1911, Bilbo ran for lieutenant governor. During the campaign, he made disparaging remarks about state senator Washington Dorsey Gibbs, provoking Gibbs to beat Bilbo with his cane until it broke over Bilbo's head. Bilbo was elected and served as lieutenant governor from 1912 to 1916. One of his first acts as lieutenant governor was to remove the resolution calling him "unfit to sit with honest men" from the state records.

In 1912, following the adoption of a popular primary election system, Bilbo managed James Vardaman's successful campaign to challenge Senator Percy for re-election in the Democratic primary. During the campaign, Vardaman and Bilbo emphasized class and racial tensions by accusing Percy of being an aristocrat and a supporter of racial integration for advocating the education of black Mississippians.

== First governorship (1916–20) ==
=== 1915 election ===
In 1915, Bilbo was elected governor of Mississippi for the first time. He won the August 3 primary over M. W. Riley without the need for a runoff and faced only nominal Socialist opposition in the November general election.

During the campaign, Bilbo vigorously targeted rural, poor white voters, making extensive personal appearances at courthouses and rural crossroads to deliver speeches promising expanded public education, better roads, and relief for farmers suffering under the ongoing boll weevil infestation. His wife Linda made several campaign speeches and may have been the first woman to actively participate in Mississippi politics. He emphasized class struggle, arguing that farmers and the poor were the victims of elite exploitation by railroads, corporations, and political machines, but also emphasized racial solidarity among whites against any perceived dilution of white supremacy.

=== Tenure ===
In his first term, Bilbo's progressive program was largely implemented. He authorized a state highway system, as well as limestone crushing plants, new dormitories at the Old Soldiers' Home, and a tuberculosis hospital, earning him the moniker "Bilbo the Builder" in The New York Times. His government also launched reforms in agriculture, education, public health, and labor rights. Bilbo has also been credited with putting state finances in order and supporting measures such as compulsory school attendance, a new charity hospital, and a state board of bank examiners.

Although Bilbo pushed through a law eliminating public hangings during his first year in office, he was criticized in the Haynes report for his response to racial violence and mob lynchings in Mississippi and pointed to as an example of the collective failure of the states to prosecute thousands of lynchings over several decades. According to the report, Bilbo said in a speech prior to the lynching of John Hartfield in Ellisville on June 26, 1919:

"I am utterly powerless. The State has no troops, and if the civil authorities at Ellisville are helpless, the States are equally so. Furthermore, excitement is at such a high pitch throughout South Mississippi that any armed attempt to interfere would doubtless result in the deaths of hundreds of persons. The negro has confessed, says he is ready to die, and nobody can keep the inevitable from happening."

Hartfield was held and beaten before ultimately being publicly lynched without trial, and the mob burned and mutilated his remains, allegedly selling parts of his corpse as souvenirs. All this, including the premeditated murder, was done with the overt support of local authorities and was announced in the local papers the day prior. Remarking on his inability to prevent the lynching after it had already occurred, Bilbo told the press, "This is a white man's country, with a white man's civilization and any dream on the part of the Negro race to share social and political equality will be shattered in the end."

University of Mississippi historian Stephen Cresswell argues that Bilbo's first term was "the most successful administration" in Mississippi history between 1877 and 1917.

=== Sex scandal and unsuccessful campaign for U.S. House ===
While still serving as governor in 1918, Bilbo ran for a seat in the United States House of Representatives. During the campaign, a bout of Texas fever broke out among cattle; Bilbo supported a program to dip cattle in insecticide to kill the ticks carrying the fever. Mississippi farmers were generally not happy about the idea, believing the insecticide would harm the animals. Bilbo's campaign was also damaged by a legislative committee's investigative report on the management of the Beauvoir Confederate Soldiers' Home. The report shockingly included allegations that Bilbo had carried on an improper, illicit affair with the home's head nurse. Bilbo denied the claim, which he attributed to "political manipulators in the Legislature," and accused the report of telling "enough lies to damn half the German army." Bilbo lost the Democratic primary to Paul B. Johnson Sr.

== Interim period (1920–28) ==
=== Russell scandal and arrest ===
After leaving office in 1920, Bilbo planned to run for the United States Senate in 1922 to succeed John Sharp Williams, intending to challenge his former ally James K. Vardaman. However, he soon became embroiled in another scandal involving Governor Lee M. Russell, who had been Lieutenant Governor during the Bilbo administration and was being sued by his former secretary for breach of promise and seduction. Russell claimed Bilbo had instigated the suit and was referenced as an anonymous witness in the plaintiff's statement. Bilbo admitted that he had paid the secretary $250 on Russell's behalf and said that “he knew something of the case and would tell the truth, should it ever come to trial.”

However, notwithstanding the plaintiff's subpoena and an order by federal judge Edwin R. Holmes, Bilbo failed to appear as a witness at the trial later that year and was imprisoned for contempt of court. When asked to explain his whereabouts, Bilbo said he had been out purchasing trees for his farm, but later reporting indicated that Russell's allies had threatened to “subject [Bilbo] to cross-examination concerning some things about which he would have been exceedingly reluctant to testify.” After 28 minutes’ deliberation, the jury found in Russell's favor.

=== 1923 gubernatorial campaign ===
In 1923, Bilbo announced his candidacy for governor from the Oxford jail, where he was serving time for his failure to appear as a witness in the Russell case. However, the sex scandals and economic woes hampered Bilbo's campaign, particularly among newly enfranchised women. His opponent, Henry L. Whitfield, was president of the Mississippi State College for Women and considered a man of “high character and exalted ideals.” At the same time, James Vardaman publicly described Bilbo's character as “vile." Bilbo lost the Democratic primary to Whitfield.

== Second governorship (1928–32) ==
=== 1927 election ===
In 1927, Bilbo ran for governor again. In the Democratic primary, he faced incumbent governor Dennis Murphree, who had succeeded Whitfield after his death. Bilbo ran on a platform proposing a state printing office to provide inexpensive school books and criticized Murphree for calling out the Mississippi National Guard to prevent a lynching in Jackson, declaring that no black person was worthy of protection by the Guard. Bilbo nearly won a majority in the first round of the primary and defeated Murphree in the runoff. Murphree attributed his loss to a "machine as ruthless and as powerful as Tammany Hall."

=== Tenure ===
Bilbo's second term as governor was marked by conflict with the state's higher education system. He initially unsuccessfully proposed relocating the University of Mississippi from Oxford to Jackson. After that proposal failed, Bilbo sought a complete overhaul of the state faculty. In 1930, Bilbo convened a meeting of the state board of colleges and universities to approve his plan to dismiss 179 faculty members, including the presidents of the University of Mississippi, Mississippi A&M, and the Mississippi State College for Women. He replaced them, respectively, with a realtor, a press agent, and a recent recipient of a bachelor's degree. The dean of the University of Mississippi School of Medicine was replaced by "a man who once had a course in dentistry."

In response, the Association of American Universities and the Southern Association of Colleges and Secondary Schools suspended their recognition of degrees from all four state colleges, the American Medical Association voted to cancel the college of medicine's accreditation, and the American Association of University Professors passed a resolution to regard the remaining Mississippi professors as "retired members of the profession" upon a finding that their dismissals had been made "for political considerations and without concern for the welfare of the students." During the crisis, students at Ole Miss burned Bilbo in effigy. The crisis ended after Bilbo left office in 1932, when "satisfactory evidence of improved conditions" was provided to the various national educational associations.

During the 1928 presidential election, Bilbo maintained his support for Democratic presidential nominee Al Smith. Many Southerners abandoned the ticket because Smith was a Catholic and opponent of Prohibition. Although he was a staunch supporter of prohibition and had strongly opposed Smith's nomination, Bilbo continued to support Smith out of party loyalty and racial resentment, refusing to align with the black-and-tan Republicans of Mississippi. He stated, “I cannot give my consent to line up with Perry Howard and other Republicans in this state.” Bilbo exploited this sentiment by publicly asking for Republican nominee Herbert Hoover’s views on racial equality, and the dismissive response from Hoover supporters sparked outrage in Mississippi. Although Hoover made a surprisingly strong showing in the South, Smith received over 82 percent of the Mississippi vote.

During his final year of office, Bilbo and the legislature reached a stalemate when he refused to sign any tax bills, and the legislature refused to approve new legislation. By the end of his term, the State of Mississippi was effectively bankrupt, with only $1,326.57 in the treasury and $11.5 million in debt.

== U.S. Senate (1934–47) ==
In 1932, shortly after leaving office, Bilbo ran for U.S. House of Representatives again. At the time, he had lost his home to bankruptcy, and he stated, “The reason I want to go to Congress is because I am busted and I need the money in my business.” Bilbo was later hired as a public relations consultant for the United States Department of Agriculture for a short time. His job, which was seen as a reward from Senator Pat Harrison for Bilbo's political support, consisted of clipping newspaper articles for a high salary. Pundits referred to him as the "Pastemaster General."

=== Elections ===
In 1934, Bilbo defeated incumbent Hubert D. Stephens to win a seat in the United States Senate. In 1940, he was re-elected by defeating Governor Hugh White.

During the 1946 Democratic primary, held after the Supreme Court of the United States ruled that segregated primary elections were unconstitutional in Smith v. Allwright, Bilbo urged his white supporters to prevent black Mississippians from voting. At least half of all black citizens were prevented from voting in the primary due to threats of violence, and Bilbo was the subject of a series of attacks by journalist Hodding Carter. However, he survived the primary against three other opponents with 51 percent of the vote. However, his conduct during the 1946 campaign gave liberals in the Senate grounds to deny him his seat.

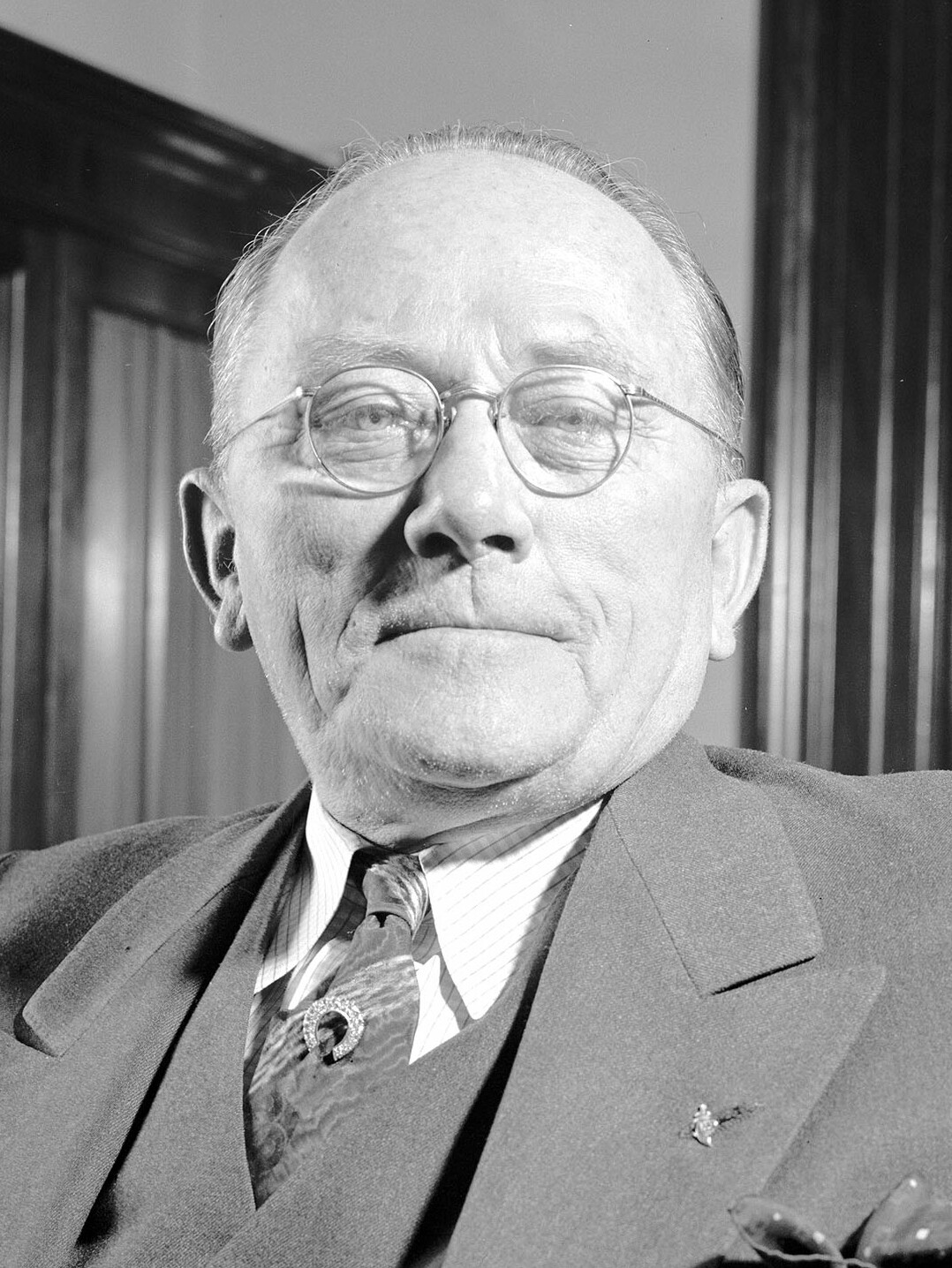
Bilbo as a United States Senator in 1939

=== Tenure ===
In the Senate, Bilbo delivered speeches haranguing a long list of enemies, including "farmer murderers", "poor-folks haters", "shooters of widows and orphans", "international well-poisoners", "charity hospital destroyers", "spitters on our heroic veterans", "rich enemies of our public schools", private bankers "who ought to come out in the open and let folks see what they're doing", "European debt-cancelers", "unemployment makers", pacifists, communists, munitions manufacturers, and "skunks who steal Gideon Bibles from hotel rooms."

On a national stage for the first time, Bilbo's outspoken support of segregation and white supremacy was extremely controversial. He continued to oppose black voting, arguing that voting should be reserved to whites throughout the United States, regardless of the Fifteenth Amendment.

In 1938, he was a prominent participant in the southern filibuster of the Costigan-Wagner anti-lynching bill, arguing that the bill would "open the floodgates of hell in the South. Raping, mobbing, lynching, race riots, and crime will be increased a thousandfold." On the floor of the Senate, he denounced Richard Wright's 1945 autobiography Black Boy as "the dirtiest, filthiest, lousiest, most obscene piece of writing that I have ever seen in print" and once referred Mary Dawes, the granddaughter of former vice president Charles G. Dawes who had married Julian Steele, as "sustained in her mad insane determination to mingle blood impregnated with the highest genetic values of the Caucasian and the blood of an African whose racial strains have dwelt for six thousand years or more in the jungles of a continent.” In August 1946, he revealed that he had been a member of the Ku Klux Klan during the 1920s.

In light of his outspoken racial extremism, the Democratic majority in the Senate sought to marginalize Bilbo by assigning him to the Senate Committee on the District of Columbia. However, he used the position to advocate for white supremacy and to attack the growing black population in the District amid the Great Migration. He chaired the committee from 1945 to 1947. He also chaired the Committee on Pensions from 1942 to 1945.

In addition to his long-held anti-black racism, Bilbo also ridiculed Jews and Italians. In 1946, he wrote to Douglas MacArthur, then-head of the Allied occupation of Japan, to argue that the Japanese should "all be sterilized."

Apart from this views on racial segregation, he was generally considered a liberal and supporter of the New Deal during his first term in office, and he became known as a "redneck liberal." During his 1940 re-election bid, President Franklin D. Roosevelt praised Bilbo as "a real friend of liberal government," and Bilbo boasted of himself as "100 percent for Roosevelt ... and the New Deal." In his second term, however, Bilbo increasingly voted with the conservative coalition in the Senate, opposing American involvement in World War II and preferring capital over labor in industrial relations. He continued to favor agricultural programs, and he owned a large farm himself. As the war began, he complained that Roosevelt's policies were driving up wages and reducing his profits.

==== Greater Liberia Act ====
Shortly after arriving in Washington, Bilbo began to support "Back-to-Africa" proposals for the repatriation of black Americans to the African continent with support from black separatists, including Marcus Garvey and Mittie Maude Lena Gordon, though other black separatists, including Thomas W. Harvey, distanced themselves from Bilbo over his history of racial hatred. On June 6, 1938, he proposed an amendment to a federal work-relief bill which would have deported twelve million black Americans to Liberia at federal expense as a solution to unemployment. The amendment was defeated.

After the defeat of his deportation amendment, Bilbo worked with Gordon and her Peace Movement of Ethiopia on a bill to fund repatriation with government support. On April 24, 1939, Bilbo presented the bill to the Senate as the "Greater Liberia Act." It proposed the additional purchase of 400,000 square miles of West African territory from France and Britain, credited on debt from World War I, and the repatriation of black Americans to the new "Greater Liberia." The bill proposed to fund repatriation through federal expenditures of $1 billion and encouraged further financial support from "any country in Europe that owes us a war debt." Black Americans between the ages of 21 and 50 would receive material aid, including a 50-acre land grant and financial assistance for one year after relocating. The bill failed to generate support.

==== Feud with Pat Harrison ====
In Washington, Bilbo feuded with Pat Harrison, despite their past alliance. Bilbo, whose base was among tenant farmers, hated the upper-class Harrison, who represented rich planters and merchants. In 1936, Bilbo supported former governor Mike Conner's primary challenge against Harrison, but Harrison easily won reelection. When the role of Senate majority leader opened up in 1937, Harrison ran and faced a close contest with Alben Barkley of Kentucky. Bilbo told Harrison's campaign manager that he would vote for Harrison only if Harrison asked him personally. Harrison replied, "Tell the son of a bitch I wouldn't speak to him even if it meant the presidency of the United States," and lost by one vote, 37 to 38.

=== Credential dispute (1947) ===
During and after his 1946 re-election, in which Bilbo actively encouraged his supporters to prevent black Mississippians from voting, Bilbo became an enduring national symbol of racial hatred and violence. He was the subject of popular satirical songs by Bob and Adrienne Claiborne ("Listen Mr. Bilbo (Talking Bilbo)") and Andrew Tibbs ("Bilbo is Dead"). In the 1947 film Gentleman's Agreement, Bilbo is cited as an exemplar of modern bigotry.

Following the 1946 election, in which Republicans gained control of the United States Senate, liberal Democratic senators joined with Republicans to refuse Bilbo his seat. In addition to the charge that he had illegally incited violence to preserve his majority, a Senate committee found that Bilbo had accepted bribes, including a Cadillac, from contractors. A filibuster by Southerners threatened to delay the seating of all new senators, but it was resolved when a supporter proposed that Bilbo's credentials remain on the table while he returned to Mississippi to seek medical treatment for oral cancer.

Bilbo retired from Washington to his estate in Poplarville, Mississippi, named Dream House, where he wrote and self-published a summary of his racial ideas entitled Take Your Choice: Separation or Mongrelization. His house, which served as the eponym and office of his publishing company, burned down in late fall that year, with the fire consuming many copies of the book. He died without ever returning to the Senate.

== Personal life and death ==
=== Death and burial ===
Bilbo died at sixty-nine on August 21, 1947, in New Orleans, Louisiana at the height of infamy. On his deathbed, he summoned Leon Louis, the editor of the black newspaper Negro South to make a statement:

I am honestly against the social intermingling of Negroes and Whites but I hold nothing personal against the Negroes as a race. They should be proud of their God-given heritage just as I am proud of mine. I believe Negroes should have the right [to indiscriminate use of the ballot], and in Mississippi too—when their main purpose is not to put me out of office and when they won't try to besmirch the reputation of my state.

According to Charles Pope Smith, when he died:

"Theodore G. Bilbo was perhaps the most controversial public figure on the national scene. ... The extremism of his pronouncements on race relations had polarized much of the country. ...To the vast majority of southern whites Bilbo had become the leading spokesman in the fight to preserve that section's structure of racial segregation from those who wanted to bring about racially equality. To liberal whites and blacks, on the other hand, Bilbo was America's most vicious race-baiter."

His funeral at Juniper Grove Cemetery in Poplarville was attended by five thousand mourners, including the governor and the junior senator.

=== Legacy ===
A bronze statue of Bilbo was placed in the rotunda of the Mississippi State Capitol building. It was later relocated to another room frequently used by the Legislative Black Caucus, and some members used the statue's outstretched arm as a coat rack. The statue was moved to storage in 2021.

In 2001, fantasy writer Andy Duncan published a satirical Lord of the Rings-themed short story titled "Senator Bilbo", set after the events in the novel and featuring a hobbit, Senator Bilbo (not to be confused with Bilbo Baggins), who holds racial views that are similar to Theodore Bilbo's.

== See also ==
Party political offices
| Preceded by Earl L. Brewer | Democratic nominee for Governor of Mississippi; 1915 | Succeeded by Lee M. Russell |
| Preceded by Henry L. Whitfield | Democratic nominee for Governor of Mississippi; 1927 | Succeeded by Martin Sennet Conner |
| Preceded by Hubert D. Stephens | Democratic nominee for U.S. Senator from Mississippi (Class 1); 1934, 1940, 1946 | Succeeded by John C. Stennis |
Political offices
| Preceded by Luther Manship | Lieutenant Governor of Mississippi; 1912–1916 | Succeeded by Lee M. Russell |
| Preceded by Earl L. Brewer | Governor of Mississippi; 1916–1920 | Succeeded by Lee M. Russell |
| Preceded by Dennis Murphree | Governor of Mississippi; 1928–1932 | Succeeded by Martin Sennett Conner |
U.S. Senate
| Preceded by Hubert D. Stephens | U.S. senator (Class 1) from Mississippi; 1935–1947; Served alongside: Pat Harrison, James O. Eastland, Wall Doxey | Succeeded by John C. Stennis |
