= Bidwell Adam =

American lawyer and politician (1894–1982)

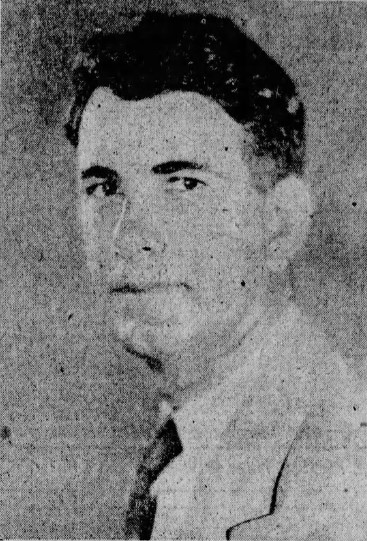

Lieutenant Governor of Mississippi
- In office January 1928 – January 1932
- Governor: Theodore G. Bilbo
- Preceded by: Dennis Murphree
- Succeeded by: Dennis Murphree

Personal details
- Born: January 12, 1894 Mobile, Alabama, U.S.
- Died: December 20, 1982 (aged 88) Gulfport, Mississippi, U.S.
- Party: Democratic

Cayton Bidwell Adam (January 12, 1894 – December 20, 1982) was an American lawyer and politician in Mississippi who served as the Lieutenant Governor of Mississippi from 1928 to 1932. He served in the military during World War I.

== Early life ==
Cayton Bidwell Adam was born on January 12, 1894, in Mobile, Alabama. He was the son of Emile J. Adam, who served as a county supervisor and justice of the peace, and his wife, Mattie (Capers) Adam. He grew up in Pass Christian, Mississippi and graduated from Millsaps College in 1913.

== Career ==
Adam was elected to the Pass Christian city council. He resigned to fight in World War I, and served in the 152nd Infantry, Company G, in France. In 1920, Adam was elected to the Board of Supervisors of Harrison County, Mississippi.

In 1927, at the age of 33, Adam was elected to the office of Lieutenant Governor of Mississippi. He held this office from 1928 to 1932. Starting in 1934, Adam was the chairman of the Harrison County Democratic Executive Committee, and Adam held this office for 36 years. From 1956 to 1968, Adam was also the Chairman of the Mississippi State Democratic Executive Committee. Adam died on the night of December 20, 1982, at his home in Gulfport, Mississippi.

He served as attorney for the city of Pass Christian. He belonged to several fraternal organizations. He married. He was in the Episcopal Church.
