= Hugh L. White =

American politician (1881–1965)

Hugh White
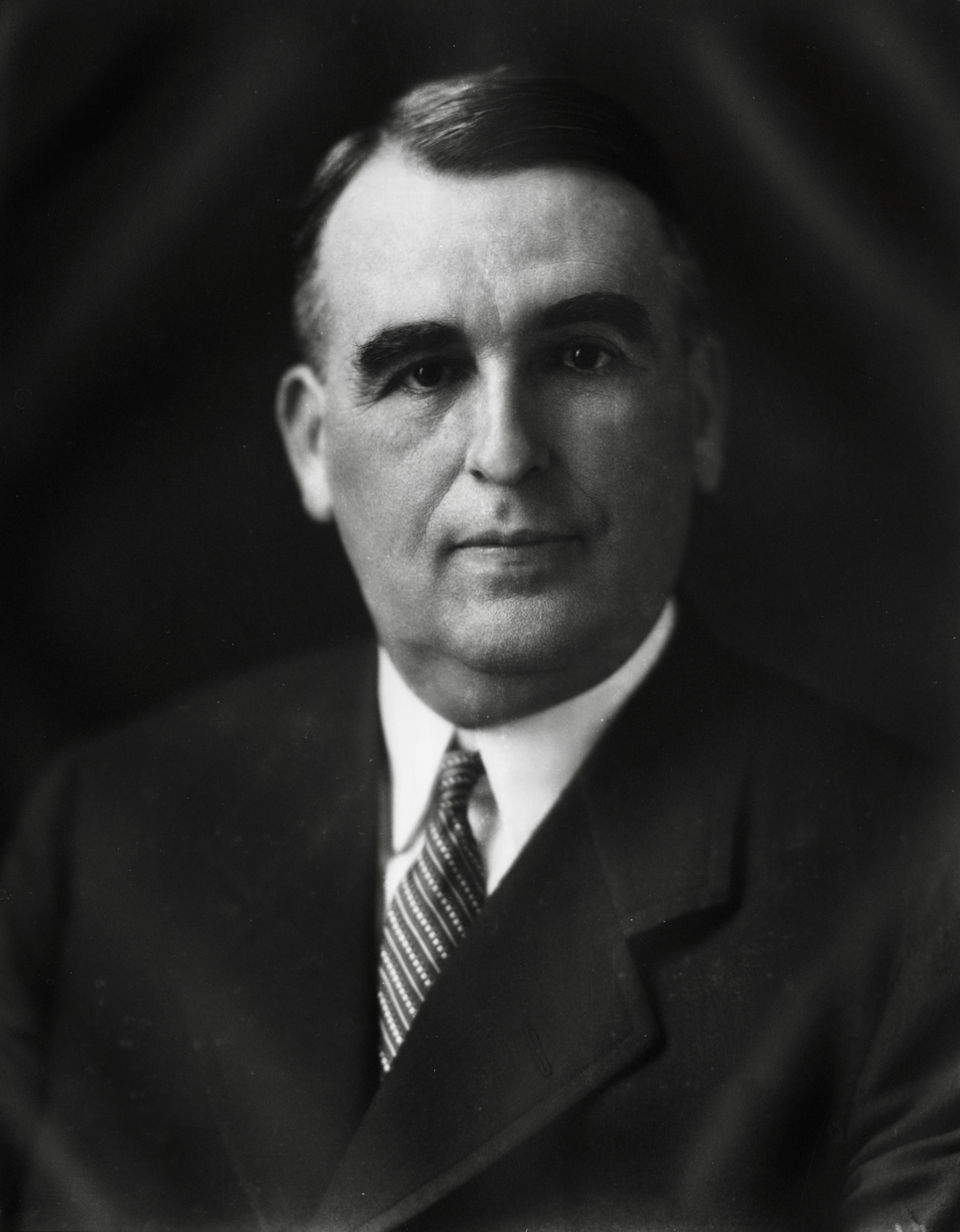

45th and 51st Governor of Mississippi
- In office January 22, 1952 – January 17, 1956
- Lieutenant: Carroll Gartin
- Preceded by: Fielding L. Wright
- Succeeded by: James P. Coleman
- In office January 21, 1936 – January 16, 1940
- Lieutenant: Jacob Buehler Snider
- Preceded by: Martin Sennet Conner
- Succeeded by: Paul B. Johnson Sr.

Personal details
- Born: Hugh Lawson White; August 19, 1881 near McComb, Mississippi, U.S.
- Died: September 20, 1965 (aged 84) McComb, Mississippi, U.S.
- Party: Democratic
- Spouse: Judith Wier Sugg
- Education: Soule Business College; University of Mississippi, Oxford

Hugh Lawson White (August 19, 1881 – September 20, 1965) was an American politician from Mississippi and a member of the Democratic Party. He served two non-consecutive terms as the governor of Mississippi (1936–1940, 1952–1956).

== Early life ==
White was born near McComb, Mississippi. He attended Soule's Business College, at St. Thomas' Hall, graduating in 1898. He then attended the University of Mississippi. While at Mississippi, he was a member of the Fraternity of Delta Psi (aka St. Anthony Hall).

== Career ==
White was an industrialist and owned J.J. White Lumber Company.

== Politics ==
White was mayor of Columbia from 1926 to 1936. He convinced the Reliance Manufacturing Company to open a plant in Columbia, helping his community survive the Great Depression.

He was first elected to the governorship in November 1935, and his term started in January 1936. He established the Balance Agriculture With Industry (BAWI) program that sought to develop an industrial base that matched the state's agricultural base. Under BAWI, advertising and incentives were deployed in hopes of enticing industries to locate to the state. Local governments could issue bonds to construct factories that could be leased to companies (which were also offered tax breaks). He also increased the number of paved roads in the state.

After leaving office due to term limits, White was a delegate representing Mississippi at the 1948 Democratic National Convention. When Mayor of Minneapolis Hubert Humphrey urged the Democratic Party to "get out of the shadow of states' rights and walk forthrightly into the bright sunshine of human rights", White and the other delegates from Mississippi and Alabama walked out of the convention. White and these delegates formed the Dixiecrat Party, nominating Strom Thurmond for president.

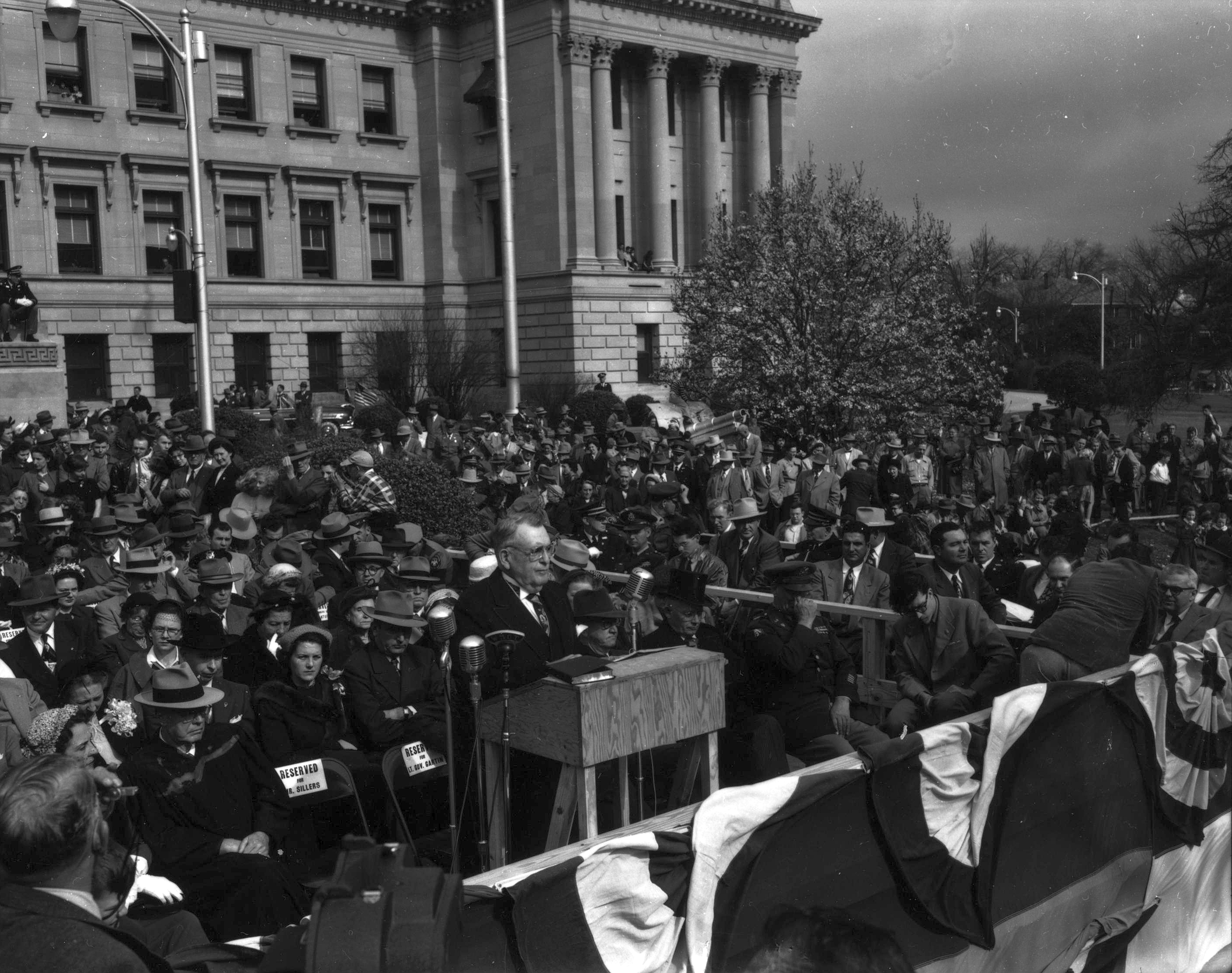
Inauguration at Mississippi State Capitol, January 22, 1952

In 1951, White won a second term, during which the issue of school segregation was a main issue. During the 1940s and early 1950s, federal courts made a series of decisions that indicated that the notion of "separate but equal" schools would soon be declared unconstitutional. Governor White and the state legislature prepared for that possibility by creating plans that sought to improve black schools. Among the proposals were increasing black teacher salaries to match white teachers' and building black schools on par with white schools. White called one hundred of the state's black leaders to a meeting at the capital to ask for their support of the plan. Much to his surprise, they overwhelmingly rejected his "voluntary" segregation plan and instead stated that they wanted only an integrated school system. In 1954, the U.S. Supreme Court made the famous Brown v. Board of Education decision that declared the practice of "separate but equal" to be unconstitutional. On August 28, 1955, towards the end of White's term as governor, the infamous lynching of Emmett Till took place. Three months earlier, an African American minister, George W. Lee, had been shot and killed in Mississippi as well. When the story of Till's death broke, White decried the violence against Till and promised a full investigation of his murder.

== Tributes ==
Hugh White State Park, a Mississippi state park, is named for him. The Keys Hill Historic District, Broad Street, Columbia, was added to the National Register of Historic Places, including White's former home, the Hugh Lawson White Mansion, for its association with him.

== Personal ==
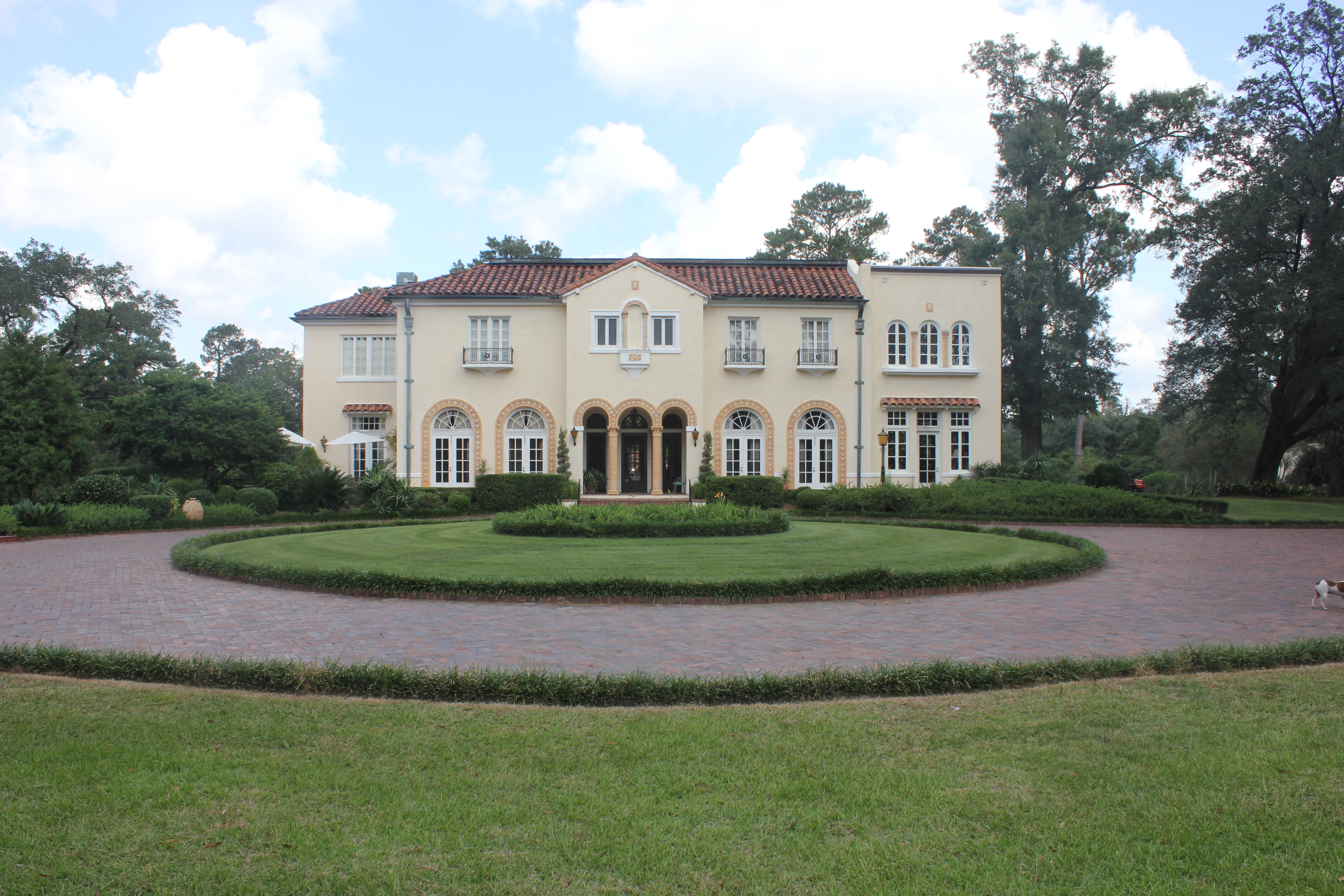
Hugh White Mansion in 2012

White married Judith Wier Sugg. His Spanish revival mansion in Marion County was built between 1925 and 1927 by Claude L. Lindley, a Jackson, Mississippi architect. His property included a formal, sunken Italian garden.

He retired from politics after his term ended in 1956. White died on September 20, 1965, and was buried in the Hollywood Cemetery in McComb, Mississippi.

Party political offices
Preceded by Martin Sennet Conner	Democratic nominee for Governor of Mississippi; 1935	Succeeded by Paul B. Johnson Sr.
Preceded by Fielding L. Wright	Democratic nominee for Governor of Mississippi; 1951	Succeeded by James P. Coleman
Political offices
Preceded by Martin Sennett Conner	Governor of Mississippi; 1936–1940	Succeeded by Paul B. Johnson Sr.
Preceded by Fielding L. Wright	Governor of Mississippi; 1952–1956	Succeeded by James P. Coleman
