= Henry L. Whitfield =

American politician (1868-1927)

Henry Lewis Whitfield
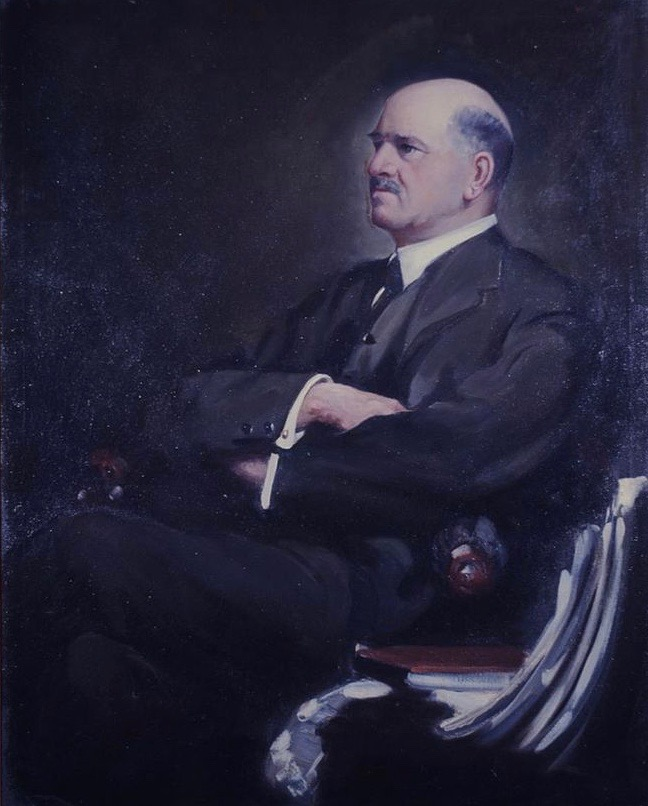

41st Governor of Mississippi
- In office January 22, 1924 – March 18, 1927
- Lieutenant: Dennis Murphree
- Preceded by: Lee M. Russell
- Succeeded by: Dennis Murphree

Personal details
- Born: June 20, 1868 near Brandon, Mississippi
- Died: March 18, 1927 (aged 58) Jackson, Mississippi
- Party: Democratic
- Spouse: Mary Damper White
- Profession: Teacher

Henry Lewis Whitfield (June 20, 1868 – March 18, 1927) was an American politician who was Governor of Mississippi from 1924 until he died in 1927.

== Biography ==
Whitfield was born in Rankin County, Mississippi. He began his teaching career at the age of sixteen. Whitfield obtained his teaching degree in 1895 from the Mississippi College. Governor Anselm J. McLaurin appointed Whitfield to state superintendent of education in 1898. He was re-elected to the post in 1899 and 1903. Whitfield was appointed president of Industrial Institute and College in 1907. The college experienced growth under his leadership.

Whitfield was elected governor in 1923, narrowly defeating Theodore G. Bilbo. This was also the first election in which women could vote for the governor.

As governor, Whitfield recommended various progressive programs such as improving the mental health care system and public schools.

Whitfield had relatively progressive racial views for a Southern governor in the 1920s, stating "The Negroes still make up slightly more than one-half of Mississippi's population. Any plans for a new era, any change in our economic life, any reorganization of our agriculture or industry which leaves them out is doomed to failure. If we would hold these laborers in the south we must compete with the northern employer on his own terms. We must improve working and living conditions, look after the Negro's health, foster manual training and modern agricultural methods, and see to it that at all times the less favored black man shall get a square deal in business relations and in the courts. Our own self interest prompts it; humanitarian considerations demand it; our Christian duty as a more favored people enjoins this upon us."

Despite his progressive actions, Whitfield also signed a bill banning the teaching of evolution in public schools.

In 1926, Whitfield fell ill. He went to Memphis, Tennessee, for treatment and returned to Jackson, Mississippi. While he could conduct business, his condition worsened, and he died in the Governor's Mansion. He is buried at the Friendship Cemetery in Columbus, Mississippi.

Party political offices
Preceded by Lee M. Russell	Democratic nominee for Governor of Mississippi; 1923	Succeeded by Theodore G. Bilbo
Political offices
Preceded by Lee M. Russell	Governor of Mississippi; 1924-1927	Succeeded by Dennis Murphree
