= Dennis Murphree =

American politician

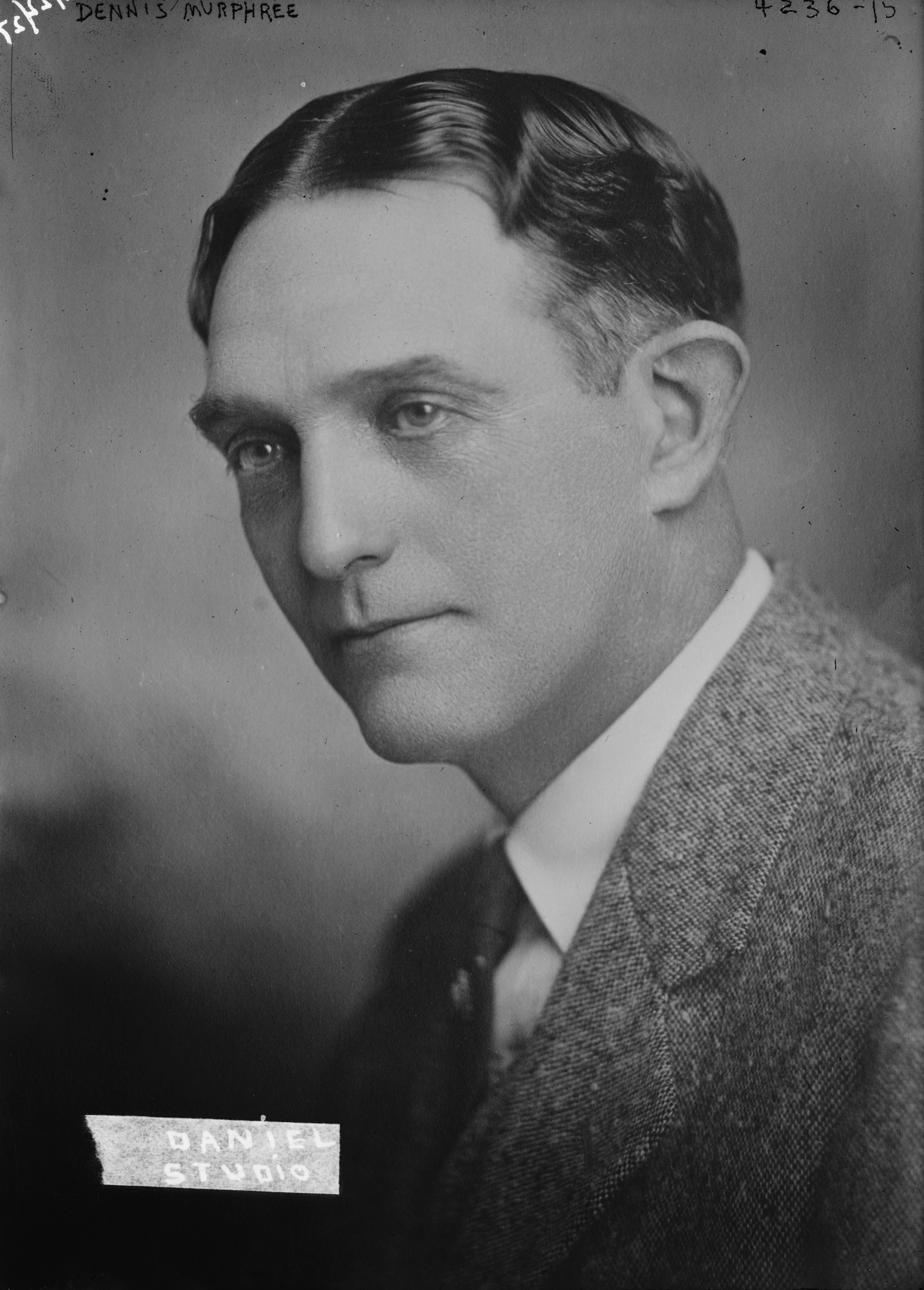

42nd and 47th Governor of Mississippi
- In office December 26, 1943 – January 18, 1944
- Preceded by: Paul B. Johnson Sr.
- Succeeded by: Thomas L. Bailey
- In office March 18, 1927 – January 17, 1928
- Preceded by: Henry L. Whitfield
- Succeeded by: Theodore G. Bilbo

20th, 22nd, and 24th Lieutenant Governor of Mississippi
- In office January 15, 1940 – December 26, 1943
- Governor: Paul B. Johnson Sr.
- Preceded by: Jacob Buehler Snider
- Succeeded by: Fielding L. Wright
- In office January 19, 1932 – January 21, 1936
- Governor: Martin Sennett Conner
- Preceded by: Bidwell Adam
- Succeeded by: Jacob Buehler Snider
- In office January 22, 1924 – March 18, 1927
- Governor: Henry L. Whitfield
- Preceded by: Homer H. Casteel
- Succeeded by: Bidwell Adam

Personal details
- Born: January 6, 1886 Pittsboro, Mississippi, U.S.
- Died: February 9, 1949 (aged 63) Pittsboro, Mississippi, U.S.
- Party: Democratic
- Spouse: Clara Martin

Dennis Herron Murphree (January 6, 1886 – February 9, 1949) was an American politician from the Democratic Party who served three terms as Lieutenant Governor of Mississippi and two as Governor of Mississippi.

== Biography ==
He was born on January 6, 1886, the son of Thomas F. Murphree and Callie (Cooper) Murphree. He was a member of the Mississippi House of Representatives from 1911 to 1923. In March 1927, he became Governor of Mississippi after the death of incumbent Henry L. Whitfield. He served for about ten months until Theodore G. Bilbo, who defeated Murphree in the Democratic Party primary by 10,000 votes, was sworn into office in January 1928. Defeat has been attributed in part to his having prevented a lynching in Jackson (he mobilized the National Guard and threw up a barbed-wire barricade around the jail). With the death of Gov. Paul B. Johnson Sr. in December 1943, Murphree finished out the three weeks left in Johnson's term, serving until the swearing-in of Thomas L. Bailey in January 1944.

Dennis Murphree conceived the idea of the Know Mississippi Better train in 1925 in response to Governor Whitfield's wish to create an exposition of Mississippi for the rest of the country. The train was successful and continued to tour annually until at least 1937. The train visited forty-seven other states, Canada, and Mexico, and showcased the state's industry, entertainment, and commerce sectors.

Party political offices
Preceded by Jacob Buehler Snider	Democratic nominee for Lieutenant Governor of Mississippi; 1939	Succeeded by Fielding L. Wright
Political offices
Preceded by Henry L. Whitfield	Governor of Mississippi; 1927–1928	Succeeded by Theodore G. Bilbo
Preceded by Paul B. Johnson Sr.	Governor of Mississippi; 1943–1944	Succeeded by Thomas L. Bailey
Preceded by Homer H. Casteel	Lieutenant Governor of Mississippi; 1924–1927	Succeeded by Bidwell Adam
Preceded by Bidwell Adam	Lieutenant Governor of Mississippi; 1932–1936	Succeeded by Jacob Buehler Snider
Preceded by Jacob Buehler Snider	Lieutenant Governor of Mississippi; 1940–1943	Succeeded by Fielding L. Wright
