= Flem D. Sampson =

42nd Governor of Kentucky

- Official portrait, unknown date

42nd Governor of Kentucky
- In office December 13, 1927 – December 8, 1931
- Lieutenant: James Breathitt Jr.
- Preceded by: William J. Fields
- Succeeded by: Ruby Laffoon

Chief Justice of the Kentucky Court of Appeals
- In office 1923–1924

Personal details
- Born: January 23, 1875 Laurel County, Kentucky, US
- Died: May 25, 1967 (aged 92) Pewee Valley, Kentucky, US
- Party: Republican
- Spouse: Susie Steele
- Education: Valparaiso University
- Profession: Lawyer

Flemon Davis "Flem" Sampson (January 23, 1875 – May 25, 1967) was the 42nd governor of Kentucky, serving from 1927 to 1931. He graduated from Valparaiso University in 1894 and opened a law practice in Barbourville, Kentucky. He formed a political alliance with future Representatives Caleb Powers and John Robsion, both prominent Republicans in the eastern part of the state. By 1916, he was serving on the Kentucky Court of Appeals (the state's highest court at the time) and had previously served as a county judge and circuit court judge. In 1923, he was elevated to chief justice of the Court of Appeals. He served until 1927, when he became the Republican gubernatorial nominee.

The Democrats nominated former governor and senator J. C. W. Beckham to challenge Sampson. The primary issue in the campaign was whether to outlaw parimutuel betting at the state's racetracks. Beckham favored the ban, and Sampson opposed it. A political machine, known as the Jockey Club, backed Sampson, and several key Democrats bolted the party after Beckham's nomination. Sampson won the governorship by over 32,000 votes, but every other Republican on the ticket lost by small majorities. The results suggested that some careful vote fraud had been coordinated to ensure Beckham's defeat, but none was ever proved.

Sampson's term in office was tumultuous. The 1928 legislature was dominated by Democrats and was not particularly responsive to Sampson's proposals. After the session, Sampson was indicted for accepting gifts from textbook companies, but the charges were later dropped. In 1929, Sampson removed Democratic political boss Ben Johnson from his post as highway commissioner. When legislators reconvened in 1930, they retaliated by stripping Sampson of many of his appointment powers and reinstalling Johnson to his post. Later in the session, Sampson proposed to allow Samuel Insull to dam the Cumberland Falls to generate hydroelectric power. The General Assembly instead voted to accept an offer from T. Coleman du Pont to purchase the falls and turn them into a state park. The Assembly voted to restrict further Sampson's powers in 1930. The end of Sampson's term was complicated by the economic realities of the Great Depression. He called out the Kentucky National Guard to quell a violent mine strike in Harlan County, known as the Battle of Evarts. Following his term, Sampson returned to Barbourville and was re-elected as a circuit court judge. He died May 25, 1967, and was buried in Barbourville Cemetery.

== Early life ==
Flem Sampson was born in a log cabin near London, Kentucky in Laurel County, the ninth of ten children born to Joseph and Emoline (née: Kellam)^{[a]} Sampson. He was educated in the county's public schools and John T. Hays School. The family moved to Barbourville, Kentucky when Sampson was 13.

By 16, Sampson was teaching at Indian Creek School in Laurel County. He attended Union College in Barbourville and then enrolled at Valparaiso University. He was class president for three years and earned an A.B. in 1894. Per university policy, he was also awarded an LL.B. because prior to graduation, he had studied for at least one year in a law office. He returned to Kentucky and was admitted to the bar in June 1895.

Sampson established his legal practice in Barbourville, where he became the city attorney. Caleb Powers, who had been Sampson's college roommate, now joined him as a partner in his law firm. Powers would later be accused of complicity in the assassination of Governor William Goebel. Because Powers was convicted by a partisan jury, he became a political martyr to many Republicans, and Sampson's connection to him became a boon in heavily Republican eastern Kentucky.

Sampson later served as president of Barbourville's First National Bank and was the youngest person ever to hold that position. He also served as president of the Barbourville Water-works Company. On September 20, 1897,^{[b]} he married Susie Steele; the couple had three daughters—Pauline, Emolyn, and Helen Katherine.

== Early political career ==
Sampson's political career began in 1906 when he was elected county judge of Knox County, Kentucky, a position that he held for four years. In 1911, he was elected to the circuit court of the 34th Judicial District. He was re-elected to this post in 1916, but later that year, he was elected to the Kentucky Court of Appeals, which was then the court of last resort in Kentucky. He represented Kentucky's Seventh Appellate District, and he was elevated to chief justice on January 1, 1923. He was re-elected to the court in 1924.

=== Elected governor of Kentucky ===
Sampson and US Representative John M. Robsion organized a formidable Republican faction in the eastern part of Kentucky. In 1927, Sampson was a candidate for the Republican gubernatorial nomination. His opponent was Robert H. Lucas, a tax collector for the Internal Revenue Service. Lucas secured the support of Kentucky Senators Frederic M. Sackett and Richard P. Ernst, and Sampson was backed by longtime supporter John M. Robsion and the Jockey Club, a coalition of leaders who supported parimutuel betting on horse races. Sampson won the primary by a margin of 39,375.

The Democratic Party was badly divided over the parimutuel betting issue as well as Prohibition, and a severance tax on coal. The prohibitionist and anti-gambling faction of the Democratic Party, with the help of Louisville Courier-Journal editor Robert Worth Bingham, united to make former governor and US Senator J. C. W. Beckham the party's gubernatorial nominee. After Beckham's nomination, many pro-gambling and anti-prohibition Democrats hurried to the support of Sampson.

The sitting Democratic governor William J. Fields, who had been elected with help from the Jockey Club, was very passive in the campaign and refused to support Beckham.

The campaign was particularly contentious. Sampson contrasted his humble roots with Beckham's aristocratic ones by declaring, "I'm just plain old Flem. When I'm elected governor of Kentucky, come into my office and sit down and say 'Howdy Flem'." He also trumpeted his own moral purity, claiming he "never smoked, chewed, drank, gambled – not even bet on an election." He promised, however, to protect horse-racing in the Commonwealth. In response, Sampson's opponents dubbed him "Flem-Flam Flem."

Sampson won the election by a majority of over 32,000 votes, although every other Republican candidate lost by small margins. In the lieutenant governor's race, Democrat James Breathitt Jr. defeated Sampson's running mate, E. E. Nelson, by 159 votes out of more than 700,000 cast. It was estimated that the Jockey Club spent half-a-million dollars to defeat Beckham, and the large majority for Sampson versus the close defeat of all other Republican candidates suggested some type of electoral fraud, but none was ever proved.

== Governor ==
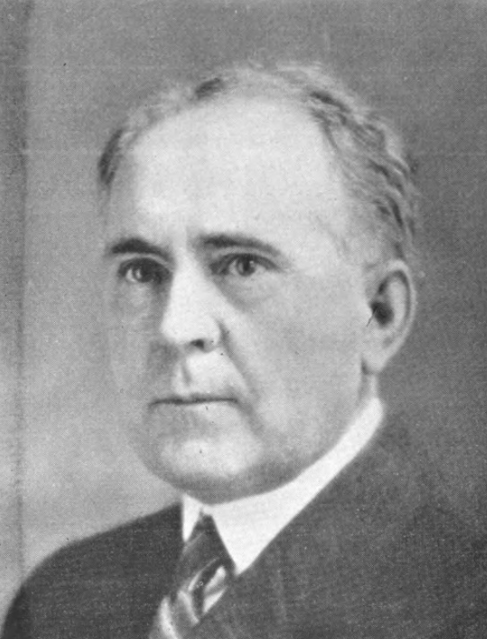
Sampson as governor.

During the 1928 legislative session, it became clear that the bipartisan support shown for Sampson had been one of political convenience rather than true conviction. Among the minor accomplishments of the session were the creation of the Kentucky Progress Commission, the forerunner of the State Department of Commerce, as well as the adoption of "My Old Kentucky Home" as the state song. The Democratic General Assembly sanctioned Sampson's plan for free textbooks but did not fund it. Proposals to ban parimutuel betting and the teaching of evolution in the state's schools were both defeated. Kentucky historian James C. Klotter called the 1928 legislative session "almost a 'do-nothing' session." Following the session, a grand jury indicted Sampson for accepting gifts from the textbook companies, but the indictment was eventually dismissed.

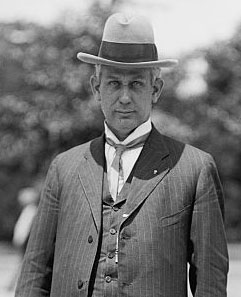
Ben Johnson was head of the state Highway Department when Sampson took office

The first major controversy of Sampson's administration was over the selection of the state's highway commissioner. The Highway Department employed over 10,000 people and spent nearly 45% of the state's budget. Legislators' votes could often be bought with promises of new roads for their districts. Thus, the department became a primary vehicle for dispensing patronage to political supporters.

Sampson's predecessor, Governor Fields, had chosen a retired US representative and Democratic political boss, Ben Johnson, to head the department, and Sampson had agreed to retain him in exchange for his support against Beckham. However, Sampson felt that such a powerful position could not be left in the hands of a Democrat, and he removed Johnson from office in December 1929.

Democrats in the General Assembly were outraged. When the 1930 legislative session convened, they immediately passed a bill that stripped Sampson of his power to appoint a highway commissioner, giving it to a three-person commission, composed of the governor, lieutenant governor, and attorney general. The Republican Sampson would then be outnumbered and outvoted. Confident that the Democrats would not lose another gubernatorial election, Democratic legislators stipulated in the bill that the appointment power would return to the governor in 1931, which was the end of Sampson's term. The law passed the House of Representatives 53—42 and the Senate 22–15. Sampson vetoed the bill, but the veto was overridden, and Johnson was returned to his former position.

Sampson also made enemies when he backed Samuel Insull's plan to dam the Cumberland Falls to generate hydroelectric power. An ally of the traditional southern power groups (the utility companies and textbook manufacturers), Sampson cited the jobs to be gained from the plan. The plan was opposed conservationists in the state and by most of the state's newspapers. An alternate plan was proposed by Louisville-born millionaire and Delaware Senator T. Coleman du Pont, who offered to purchase the falls for $230,000 and turn it into a state park. The General Assembly passed legislation giving the state park commission the right of eminent domain over the falls and then voted to accept the du Pont's offer. Sampson vetoed the Assembly's action, but his veto was overridden.

Sampson's agenda for the 1930 session was lost in the fights over Ben Johnson and Cumberland Falls. His calls for funding the free textbook program, compulsory sterilization of the mentally ill, and restrictions on chain stores were ignored. Instead, the legislature further eroded his gubernatorial powers, including the power to appoint members of the textbook commission. With nearly all of the governor's powers stripped away and given to a three-person commission, Lieutenant Governor James Breathitt Jr. became the de facto governor for the remainder of Sampson's term.

The General Assembly pursued its own agenda, passing a mandatory driver's license law, a revised election law, and a sales tax on retail stores. It also allocated funding for the purchase of what would become Mammoth Cave National Park. Sampson vetoed 12 bills during the 1930 session, but the legislature overrode 11 of them.

With the onset of the Great Depression, Sampson worked to control government costs, but he endorsed highway construction. A severe drought in 1930 left 86 of the state's counties applying for federal aid.

As unemployment in the eastern coal fields climbed to 40 percent, the United Mine Workers made their first inroads in the region. In 1931, mine owners began firing workers who joined the union. Many of those workers gathered in Evarts, Kentucky. The local sheriff added 26 deputies to his staff, helping to enforce the blacklisting of those miners and to discourage further organization. Union leaders petitioned Sampson to remove the sheriff and the county judge from office.

Violent squabbles between striking union miners and local authorities began as early as mid-April 1931. On May 5, 1931, three guards and a miner were killed in a shootout that became known as the Battle of Evarts. Two days later, Sampson called in the Kentucky National Guard to disarm both the mine guards and the union miners. All of the union's leaders were arrested, and the strike ultimately failed.

== Later life ==
Following his term as governor, Sampson returned to his legal practice in Barbourville and was elected as a circuit court judge. In 1940, he once again sought election to the Kentucky Court of Appeals but was defeated in the Republican primary by Eugene Siler.

In 1957, he was appointed to the Citizens' Advisory Highway Committee and was awarded the Governor's Medallion for distinguished public service in 1959.

At the age of 91, Sampson served on the State Constitutional Revision Committee. He died in Pewee Valley, Kentucky on May 25, 1967, and was buried at the Barbourville Cemetery.

== Notes ==
^[a]Powell gives the name as "Kellums."
^[b]Powell gives the year as 1899.

== Sources ==
- Bush, Carletta A. (2006). "Faith, Power, and Conflict: Miner Preachers and the United Mine Workers of America in the Harlan County Mine Wars, 1931–1939". West Virginia University. Archived from the original (PDF) on May 19, 2009.
- Finch, Glenn (January 1970). "The Election of United States Senators in Kentucky: The Beckham Period". Filson Club History Quarterly. 44.
- Harrison, Lowell H. (1992). "Sampson, Flem D.". In Kleber, John E. (ed.). The Kentucky Encyclopedia. Associate editors: Thomas D. Clark, Lowell H. Harrison, and James C. Klotter. Lexington, Kentucky: The University Press of Kentucky. ISBN 0-8131-1772-0.
- Harrison, Lowell H.; James C. Klotter (1997). A New History of Kentucky. University Press of Kentucky. ISBN 0-8131-2008-X.
- Johnson, E. Polk (1912). A History of Kentucky and Kentuckians: The Leaders and Representative Men in Commerce, Industry and Modern Activities. Lewis Publishing Company.
- "Kentucky Governor Flem Davis Sampson". National Governors Association.
- Klotter, James C. (1996). Kentucky: Portraits in Paradox, 1900–1950. University Press of Kentucky. ISBN 0-916968-24-3.
- Powell, Robert A. (1976). Kentucky Governors. Danville, Kentucky: Bluegrass Printing Company. OCLC 2690774.
- "Sampson Fails to Come Back". Kentucky New Era. August 6, 1940.
- Sexton, Robert F. (2004). "Flem D. Sampson". In Lowell Hayes Harrison (ed.). Kentucky's Governors. Lexington, Kentucky: The University Press of Kentucky. ISBN 0-8131-2326-7.

Political offices
Preceded by William J. Fields	Governor of Kentucky; 1927–1931	Succeeded by Ruby Laffoon
Party political offices
Preceded by Charles I. Dawson	Republican nominee for Governor of Kentucky; 1927	Succeeded by William B. Harrison
