= 1926 United States Senate election in Kentucky =

- November 6, 1926
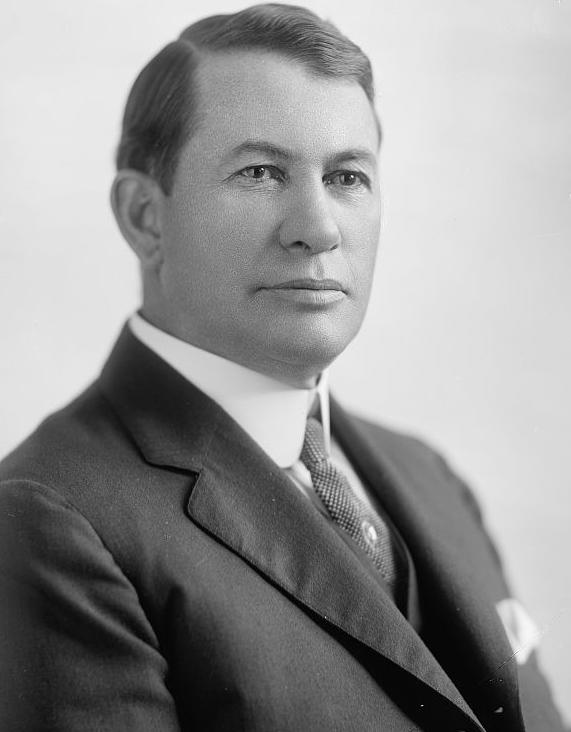

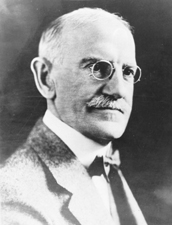
| Nominee | Alben Barkley | Richard P. Ernst |
| Party | Democratic | Republican |
| Popular vote | 286,997 | 266,657 |
| Percentage | 51.8% | 48.2% |
- County results Barkley: 50–60% 60–70% 70–80% 80–90% Ernst: 50–60% 60–70% 70–80% 80–90% >90%
U.S. senator before election
Richard P. Ernst
Republican
Elected U.S. Senator
Alben Barkley
Democratic

The 1926 United States Senate election in Kentucky took place on November 2, 1926. Republican Senator Richard P. Ernst ran for re-election to a second term in office but was defeated by Democratic U.S. Representative Alben W. Barkley, who would go on to serve for twenty-two years before ascending to become Vice President of the United States.

== General election ==
=== Candidates ===
- Alben W. Barkley, U.S. Representative from Paducah and candidate for Governor in 1923 (Democratic)
- Richard P. Ernst, incumbent U.S. Senator since 1921 (Republican)

=== Campaign ===
Barkley announced his campaign on April 26 with the support of organized labor in the state; because of his role in crafting the Railway Labor Act, the Associated Railway Labor Organizations endorsed him in advance. Since his failed 1923 gubernatorial campaign, he had distanced himself from political boss Percy Haly and promised that he would not push a national ban on parimutuel betting if elected. Consequently, he had no opposition in the primary. Congressman (and future Chief Justice of the United States) Fred M. Vinson managed his general election campaign.

President Calvin Coolidge supported Ernst, and Commerce Secretary Herbert Hoover campaigned in the state on his behalf. Ernst had opposed a bonus for veterans of World War I, an unpopular position in Kentucky, and at 68 years old, his age worked against him. Barkley contrasted his impoverished upbringing with Ernst's affluent lifestyle as a corporate attorney and attacked him for supporting Michigan senator Truman Handy Newberry, who had resigned due to allegations of election fraud. Republican voters were angered that Ernst did not support Republican Congressman John W. Langley when Langley was charged with illegally aiding a large bootlegging operation in Louisville. Ernst tried to resurrect the issues of Barkley's support for the coal tax and opposition to parimutuel betting.

=== Results ===
1926 U.S. Senate election in Kentucky
| Party | Candidate | Votes | % | ±% |
|---|---|---|---|---|
| Democratic | Alben W. Barkley | 286,997 | 51.84% | |
| Republican | Richard P. Ernst (incumbent) | 266,657 | 48.16% | |
| Majority | | 20,340 | 3.68% | |
| Total votes | | 553,654 | 100.00% | |
| Democratic gain from Republican | | | | |

== See also ==
- 1926 United States Senate elections

== Bibliography ==
- Congressional Elections, 1946–1996. Washington, D.C.: Congressional Quarterly Inc. 1998. ISBN 1-56802-248-4.
- Finch, Glenn (July 1971). "The Election of United States Senators in Kentucky: The Barkley Period". Filson Club History Quarterly. 45 (3).
- Harrison, Lowell H.; Klotter, James C. (1997). A New History of Kentucky. Lexington, Kentucky: The University Press of Kentucky. ISBN 0-8131-2008-X. Archived from the original on March 8, 2021.
- Jewell, Malcolm E. (1963). Kentucky Votes. Vol. 1. University of Kentucky Press.
- Klotter, James C. (1996). Kentucky: Portraits in Paradox, 1900–1950. Lexington, Kentucky: The University Press of Kentucky. ISBN 0-916968-24-3.
- Libbey, James K. (1979). Dear Alben: Mr. Barkley of Kentucky. Lexington, Kentucky: The University Press of Kentucky. ISBN 0-8131-0238-3. Archived from the original on December 2, 2021.
- Libbey, James K. (1992). "Barkley, Alben William". In John E. Kleber (ed.). The Kentucky Encyclopedia. Associate editors: Thomas D. Clark, Lowell H. Harrison, and James C. Klotter. Lexington, Kentucky: The University Press of Kentucky. ISBN 0-8131-1772-0. Archived from the original on July 26, 2020.
