= 1903 Kentucky gubernatorial election =

- November 3, 1903
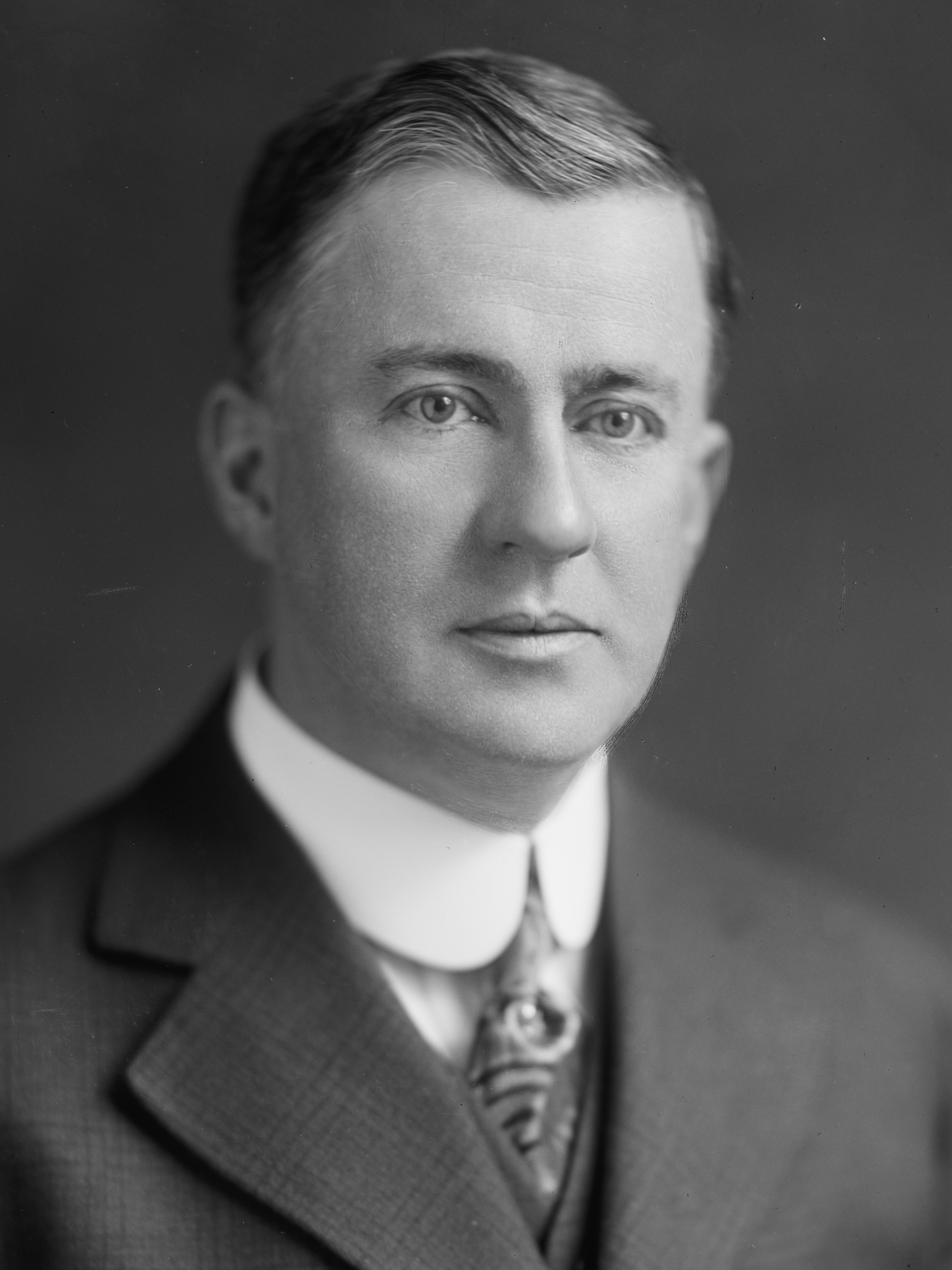

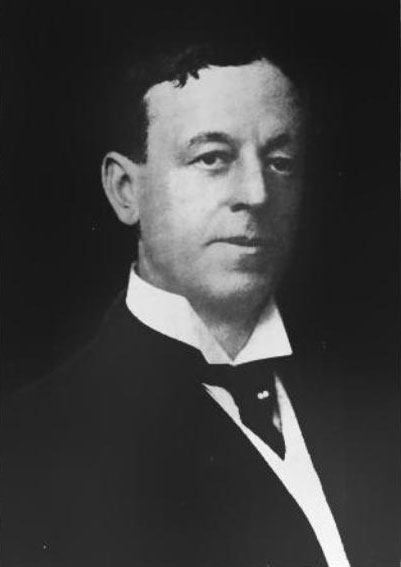
Nominee	J. C. W. Beckham	Morris B. Belknap
Party	Democratic	Republican
Popular vote	229,014	202,862
Percentage	52.12%	46.17%
- Beckham: 40–50% 50–60% 60–70% 70–80% Belknap: 40–50% 50–60% 60–70% 70–80% 80–90% >90%
Governor before election
J. C. W. Beckham
Democratic
Elected Governor
J. C. W. Beckham
Democratic

The 1903 Kentucky gubernatorial election was held on November 3, 1903. The incumbent Democratic governor, J. C. W. Beckham, defeated Republican nominee Morris B. Belknap to a win a term in his own right.

== Background ==
Although the Constitution of Kentucky prohibited governors from serving consecutive terms, J. C. W. Beckham, who won the 1900 special election to complete William Goebel's unexpired term, announced that he would seek a full term as governor in 1903. His candidacy was challenged in court, but the court ruled that Beckham had not served a full first term and so was eligible to run.

== General election ==
Beckham's record of reconciliation and of supporting non-controversial reforms prevented significant opposition when he won the party's nomination. His record also deprived his Republican opponent, Morris B. Belknap, of any significant campaign issue in the general election. Belknap touted his business management experience, contrasting it with charges that Governor Beckham had mismanaged the state's eleemosynary institutions. Belknap lacked name recognition outside Louisville; he was a poor public speaker and unable to make the race truly competitive. The New York Times reported that Belknap was "an athlete as well as a politician and a millionaire businessman".

Election day was a rowdy one throughout Kentucky as a judge supporting Belknap was shot by a sheriff at a polling place in Louisville. Beckham defeated Belknap and three minor candidates. Beckham won the majority of the popular vote, marking the first time in sixteen years that the Democrats had gained a majority of the votes cast.

1903 Kentucky gubernatorial election
Party	Candidate	Votes	%	±%
Democratic	J. C. W. Beckham (incumbent)	229,014	52.12%	
Republican	Morris B. Belknap	202,862	46.17%	
Prohibition	T. P. Demaree	4,830	1.10%	
Socialist Labor	Alfred Schmitz	2,044	0.47%	
Socialist	Adam Nagel	615	0.14%	
Majority		26,152		
Democratic hold		Swing		

== Works cited ==
=== Books ===
- Guide to U.S. Elections. Vol. 2. CQ Press. 2005. ISBN 978-1-56802-981-8.
- Harrison, Lowell H. (1992). Kleber, John E. (ed.). The Kentucky Encyclopedia. University Press of Kentucky. ISBN 978-0-8131-1772-0.
- Klotter, James C. (1977). William Goebel: The Politics of Wrath. University Press of Kentucky. ISBN 978-0-8131-0240-5.
- —— (1996). Kentucky: Portrait in Paradox, 1900–1950. University Press of Kentucky. ISBN 978-0-916968-24-3.
- Powell, Robert A. (1976). Kentucky Governors. Bluegrass Printing Company.

=== Journal articles ===
- Burckel, Nicholas C. (1978). "From Beckham to McCreary: The Progressive Record of Kentucky Governors". The Register of the Kentucky Historical Society. 76 (4): 285–306. JSTOR 23378562.
