= 1938 United States Senate election in Kentucky =

- November 6, 1938
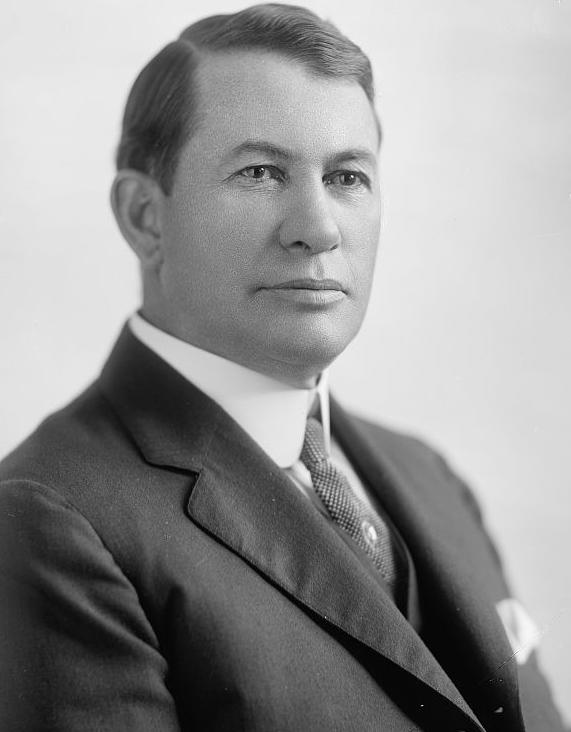

Nominee	Alben Barkley	John P. Haswell
Party	Democratic	Republican
Popular vote	346,735	212,266
Percentage	62.0%	38.0%
- County results Barkley: 50–60% 60–70% 70–80% 80–90% >90% Haswell: 50–60% 60–70% 70–80% 80–90%
U.S. senator before election
Alben Barkley
Democratic
Elected U.S. Senator
Alben Barkley
Democratic

The 1938 United States Senate election in Kentucky took place on November 8, 1938. Democratic incumbent Alben Barkley, who also served as Senate majority leader, was re-elected to a third term in office over Republican judge John P. Haswell after defeating a primary challenge from Kentucky governor Happy Chandler.

Primary elections were held on August 8. In the Democratic primary, Barkley faced a stiff challenge from Chandler, reflecting national divisions between supporters and opponents of President Franklin D. Roosevelt's New Deal programs. Chandler struggled to define his platform, which sought to appeal to Roosevelt supporters while taking multiple positions on the New Deal. Instead, the campaign was marked by personal accusations of corruption on both sides and Chandler's claim that members of the Barkley campaigned had poisoned him. Barkley, who was backed by Roosevelt, ultimately defeated Chandler by over 70,000 votes. Due in part to the conduct of Roosevelt administration officials on behalf of Barkley during the primary, Congress passed the Hatch Act to restrict public officials from using their office to engage in political activities. In the Republican primary, Haswell won easily with a majority of the vote.

== Democratic primary ==
=== Candidates ===
- Alben W. Barkley, incumbent U.S. senator since 1927 and Senate majority leader
- Happy Chandler, governor of Kentucky since 1935

=== Background ===
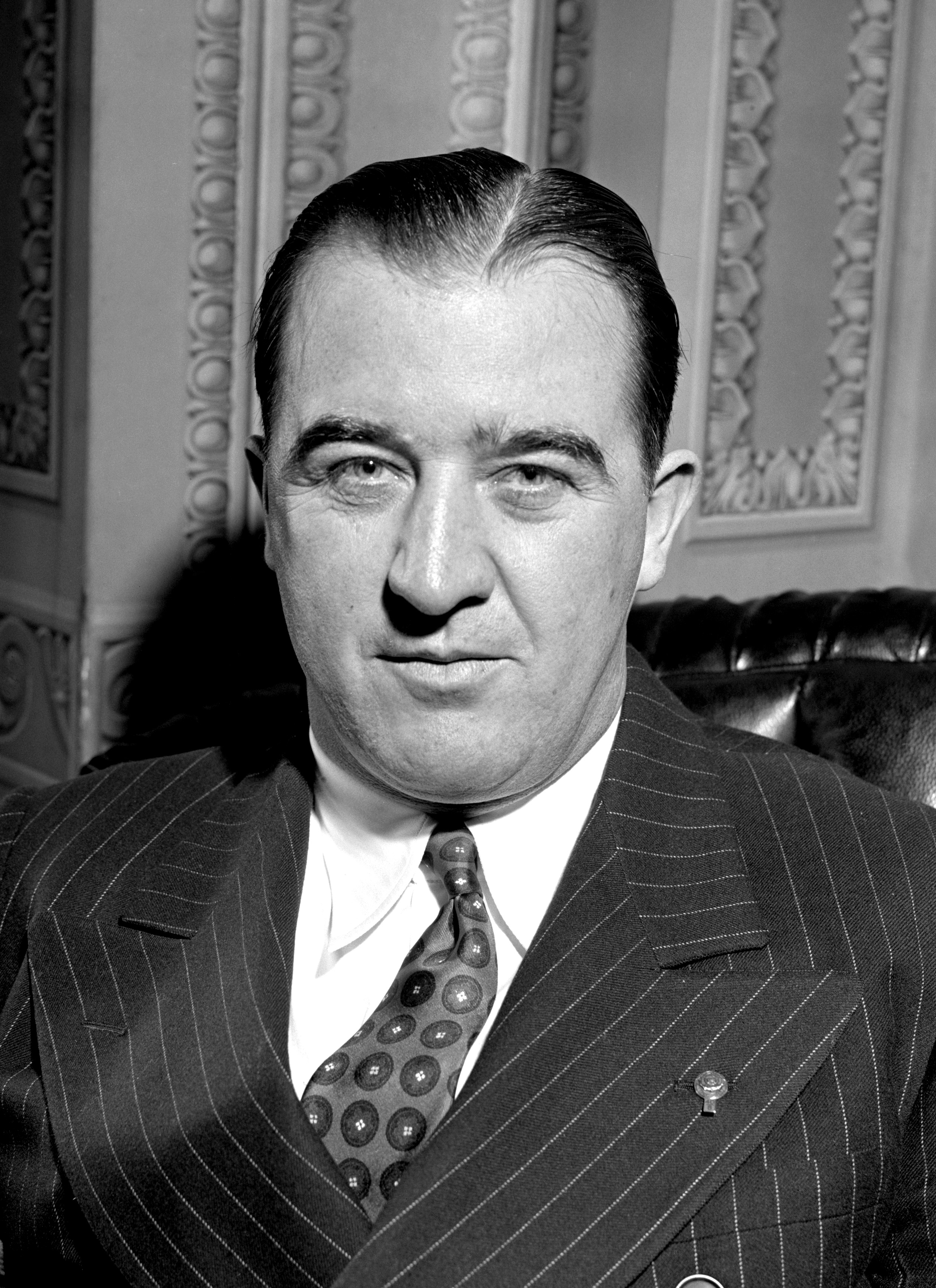
Happy Chandler unsuccessfully challenged Barkley for his U.S. Senate seat.

Barkley faced a primary challenge in his 1938 re-election bid from Happy Chandler, Kentucky's popular governor who had a strong political organization throughout the state. According to historian James C. Klotter, Chandler was confident of his ascension to the presidency and saw the Senate as a stepping stone. Chandler twice asked President Franklin Roosevelt to appoint Kentucky's junior senator, M. M. Logan, to a federal judgeship so he could arrange his own appointment to Logan's seat. The retirement of Supreme Court justice George Sutherland in January 1938 gave Roosevelt the opportunity to accommodate Chandler's wishes, but Roosevelt preferred a younger option, and Barkley recommended solicitor general Stanley Forman Reed for the appointment. Chandler's mentor, Virginia senator Harry F. Byrd, and the bloc of Democrats who opposed Roosevelt's New Deal then encouraged Chandler to announce his candidacy for Barkley's seat. Chandler's candidacy would serve as a counterbalance to Roosevelt's 1938 efforts to purge the party of opponents in the Senate.

Eager to augment his power and angered by the refusal of Roosevelt and Barkley to accept his suggestion of appointing Logan to the Supreme Court, Chandler did not attend a long-planned dinner in Barkley's honor on January 22, 1938. Instead, he held an event of his own at Louisville's exclusive Pendennis Club and alluded to his plans to challenge Barkley in the upcoming primary. Barkley officially announced his re-election bid on the following day, January 23. The death of another federal judge on January 26 provided a second opportunity for Roosevelt to appoint Logan to a judgeship and appease Chandler, but Logan refused to consider the appointment. Following a January 31 meeting in Washington, D.C. between Roosevelt and Chandler, in which Roosevelt urged Chandler to put his senatorial ambitions on hold, Byrd encouraged Chandler to challenge Barkley. Chandler officially announced his candidacy on February 23 in Newport.

=== Campaign ===
The New York Times framed the primary, one of several within the Democratic Party that year, as "the Gettysburg of the party's internecine strife" over control of the Democratic National Convention in 1940. Early on, Chandler portrayed himself as a supporter of Roosevelt personally–since Roosevelt was popular in Kentucky–but opponent of the New Deal. He pointed to his fiscal conservatism as governor, including reorganizing and downsizing the executive branch and reducing the state's debt. In April, polls showed Barkley ahead of Chandler by a 2-to-1 margin. The May 3 primary victory of Florida senator Claude Pepper, who supported the New Deal, finally persuaded Chandler to abandon his attacks of the program. He criticized Barkley as "a stranger to the state" and obliquely referred to "fat, sleek senators who go to Europe and have forgotten the people of Kentucky except when they run for election." Chandler, who was 20 years younger than Barkley, referred to the incumbent as "Old Alben" to highlight his age.

Early in the contest, Barkley could only campaign on weekends and enlisted allies including Fred M. Vinson to speak on his behalf. Chandler's enemies, such as former governor Ruby Laffoon and former U.S. representative John Y. Brown, also supported Barkley. Although labor leaders had backed Chandler's gubernatorial bid, they endorsed Barkley because of Roosevelt's support for labor unions.

==== WPA involvement and influence on Hatch Act ====
In late May 1938, Chandler's campaign manager publicly claimed that federal relief agencies, especially the Works Progress Administration (WPA), were openly working for Barkley's re-election. Although Barkley and George H. Goodman, director of the WPA in Kentucky, denied the charges, veteran reporter Thomas Lunsford Stokes launched an investigation of the agency's activities in the state and eventually raised 22 charges of political corruption and pressure on federal employees in a series of eight articles covering the primary campaign. A United States committee investigated his findings; WPA administrator Harry Hopkins claimed the committee report refuted all but two of Stokes's charges. Stokes later won the 1939 Pulitzer Prize for Reporting for his work on federal employees Kentucky and Pennsylvania. In the wake of the Senate committee's investigation, Congress passed the Hatch Act of 1939 to limit the WPA's involvement in future elections.

The negative effects of the investigation on Barkley's campaign were minimal, because of Chandler's own use of his gubernatorial power and patronage on behalf of his own campaign. As nearly every twentieth century Kentucky governor had done, Chandler printed campaign materials with state funds, solicited campaign funds from state employees, and promised new government jobs in exchange for votes. Dan Talbott, one of Chandler's chief political advisors, encouraged supervisors to take punitive action against employees who made "pessimistic expressions" about Chandler's chances in the primary, and Chandler initiated a rural road-building project in the state, employing loyal supporters to construct and maintain the new roads. State workers who supported Chandler were employed to deliver pension checks to the state's elderly citizens, and Talbott did not deny charges that the workers threatened to withhold the checks if the recipients did not pledge their support to Chandler. A later investigation determined that Chandler had raised at least $10,000 in campaign funds from state employees.

Recognizing that the defeat of his hand-picked floor leader would be a repudiation of his agenda, Roosevelt began a personal tour of the state in Covington on July 8. As governor, Chandler was on hand to greet Roosevelt on his arrival in Covington and sat between Roosevelt and Barkley in the back seat of the open-topped vehicle that transported them to Latonia Race Track, the site of Roosevelt's first speech. Throughout his tour of the state, Roosevelt praised Barkley but remained friendly with Chandler. Although clearly campaigning for Barkley, Roosevelt made courteous remarks about Chandler in the spirit of party unity, but in Bowling Green, he chastised Chandler for "dragging federal judgeships into a political campaign." After Roosevelt's departure, Chandler played up Roosevelt's complimentary remarks about him but downplayed or ignored the critical remarks.

After the congressional session ended, Barkley made between 8 and 15 speeches each day and traveled 4,500 miles (7,200 km) per week. This barnstorming tour countered Chandler's criticisms of Barkley's age, a charge that was further blunted when Chandler fell ill in July, temporarily halting his campaign. Chandler described his malady as "intestinal poisoning." His doctor claimed that Chandler, Talbott, and a state police officer had all been poisoned by water that had been provided to Chandler for a radio address. Chandler insinuated that the Barkley campaign was responsible, but the charge never gained credence with the press or the electorate. Barkley frequently mocked it on the campaign trail by first accepting a glass of water offered to him and then shuddering and rejecting it.

=== Polling ===
Poll source	Date published	Alben Barkley	Happy Chandler
American Institute of Public Opinion	March 1938	69%	31%
American Institute of Public Opinion	April 1938	67%	33%
American Institute of Public Opinion	May 1938	65%	35%
American Institute of Public Opinion	July 8, 1938	64%	36%
American Institute of Public Opinion	July 24, 1938	61%	39%
American Institute of Public Opinion	August 5, 1938	59%	41%

=== Results ===
Primary results by county Barkley: 40%–50%; 50%–60%; 60%–70%; 70%–80%; Chandler: 40%–50%; 50%–60%; 60%–70%

Barkley won the August 6 election by a vote of 294,562 to 223,690, carrying 74 of Kentucky's 120 counties, with large majorities in western Kentucky, the city of Louisville, and rural areas. It was the first loss of Chandler's political career, and the worst suffered by a primary candidate in Kentucky's history to that time.

1938 U.S. Senate Democratic primary
Party	Candidate	Votes	%
Democratic	Alben W. Barkley (inc.)	294,562	56.05
Democratic	Happy Chandler	223,690	42.56
Democratic	Hugh K. Bullitt	2,636	0.50
Democratic	G. A. Hendon, Jr.	854	0.16
Democratic	Munnell Wilson	759	0.14
Democratic	Frank Coyle	702	0.13
Democratic	John H. Dougherty	586	0.11
Democratic	Edward L. Macky	424	0.08
Democratic	J. Ward Lehigh	411	0.08
Democratic	Stuart Lampe	397	0.08
Democratic	W. T. McNally	195	0.04
Democratic	John L. Sullivan	175	0.03
Democratic	John E. Trager	163	0.03
Total votes		525,554	100.00

=== Aftermath ===
Encouraged by Barkley's success, Roosevelt campaigned against conservative Democratic incumbents in southern states, but all of these candidates won, which damaged Roosevelt's image.

When Senator Logan died on October 9, 1939, Chandler resigned as Governor so that Lieutenant Governor Keen Johnson could appoint him to the vacant seat. He won the special election to complete the term and a regular election to a full term in 1942, each time winning competitive Democratic primary races. At the 1944 Democratic National Convention, he unsuccessfully angled to have himself nominated as Roosevelt's running mate. His bid collapsed when the Kentucky delegation chose to support Barkley over him.

Barkley served out his term and was re-elected in 1944. When Harry S. Truman, who had defeated Chandler for the vice presidential nomination, succeeded to the presidency, he selected Barkley as his own running mate for the 1948 presidential election. The Truman-Barkley ticket won despite opposition from Chandler and some other Southern Democrats.

== Republican primary ==
=== Candidates ===
- Roscoe Conklin Douglas
- John P. Haswell, Louisville judge
- G. Tom Hawkins
- Andrew O. Ritchie
- Elmer C. Roberts

=== Results ===
Primary results by county Haswell: 30%–40%; 40%–50%; 50%–60%; 60%–70%; 70%–80%; 80%–90%; 90%–100%; Ritchie: 30%–40%; 40%–50%; 50%–60%; Hawkins: 20%–30%; 30%–40%; Other: 30%–40%; 40%–50%; 50%–60%; 70%–80%; Tie: 30%–40%

1938 U.S. Senate Republican primary
Party	Candidate	Votes	%
Republican	John P. Haswell	34,971	58.81
Republican	Andrew O. Ritchie	8,267	13.90
Republican	G. Tom Hawkins	6,219	10.46
Republican	Roscoe Conklin Douglas	5,157	8.67
Republican	Elmer C. Roberts	4,854	8.16
Total votes		59,468	100.00

== General election ==
=== Candidates ===
- Alben W. Barkley, incumbent U.S. senator since 1927 and Senate majority leader (Democratic)
- John P. Haswell, Louisville judge (Republican)

=== Results ===
Barkley defeated his Republican opponent, Louisville judge John P. Haswell, securing 62 percent of the general election vote.

1938 U.S. Senate election in Kentucky
Party	Candidate	Votes	%	±%
Democratic	Alben W. Barkley (incumbent)	346,735	62.03%	
Republican	John P. Haswell	212,266	37.97%	
Democratic	Happy Chandler (write-in)	20	0.00%	
Majority		83,628	9.88%	
Total votes		559,021	100.00%	
Democratic hold				

== See also ==
- 1938 United States Senate elections
- Presidency of Franklin D. Roosevelt, first and second terms

== Bibliography ==
- Congressional Elections, 1946-1996. Washington, D.C.: Congressional Quarterly Inc. 1998. ISBN 1-56802-248-4.
- Finch, Glenn (July 1971). "The Election of United States Senators in Kentucky: The Barkley Period". Filson Club History Quarterly. 45 (3).
- Harrison, Lowell H. (1992). "Chandler, Albert Benjamin". In John E. Kleber (ed.). The Kentucky Encyclopedia. Associate editors: Thomas D. Clark, Lowell H. Harrison, and James C. Klotter. Lexington, Kentucky: The University Press of Kentucky. ISBN 0-8131-1772-0.
- Harrison, Lowell H.; Klotter, James C. (1997). A New History of Kentucky. Lexington, Kentucky: The University Press of Kentucky. ISBN 0-8131-2008-X. Archived from the original on March 8, 2021.
- Hixson, Walter L. (Summer 1982). "The 1938 Kentucky Senate Election: Alben W. Barkley, "Happy" Chandler, and the New Deal". Register of the Kentucky Historical Society. 80: 309–329 – via JSTOR.
- Jewell, Malcolm E. (1963). Kentucky Votes. Vol. 1. University of Kentucky Press.
- Klotter, James C. (1996). Kentucky: Portraits in Paradox, 1900–1950. Lexington, Kentucky: The University Press of Kentucky. ISBN 0-916968-24-3.
- Libbey, James K. (1979). Dear Alben: Mr. Barkley of Kentucky. Lexington, Kentucky: The University Press of Kentucky. ISBN 0-8131-0238-3. Archived from the original on December 2, 2021.
- Libbey, James K. (1992). "Barkley, Alben William". In John E. Kleber (ed.). The Kentucky Encyclopedia. Associate editors: Thomas D. Clark, Lowell H. Harrison, and James C. Klotter. Lexington, Kentucky: The University Press of Kentucky. ISBN 0-8131-1772-0. Archived from the original on July 26, 2020.
