= 1920 United States Senate election in Kentucky =

- November 2, 1920
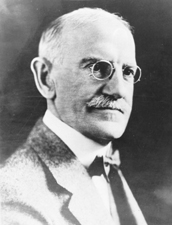

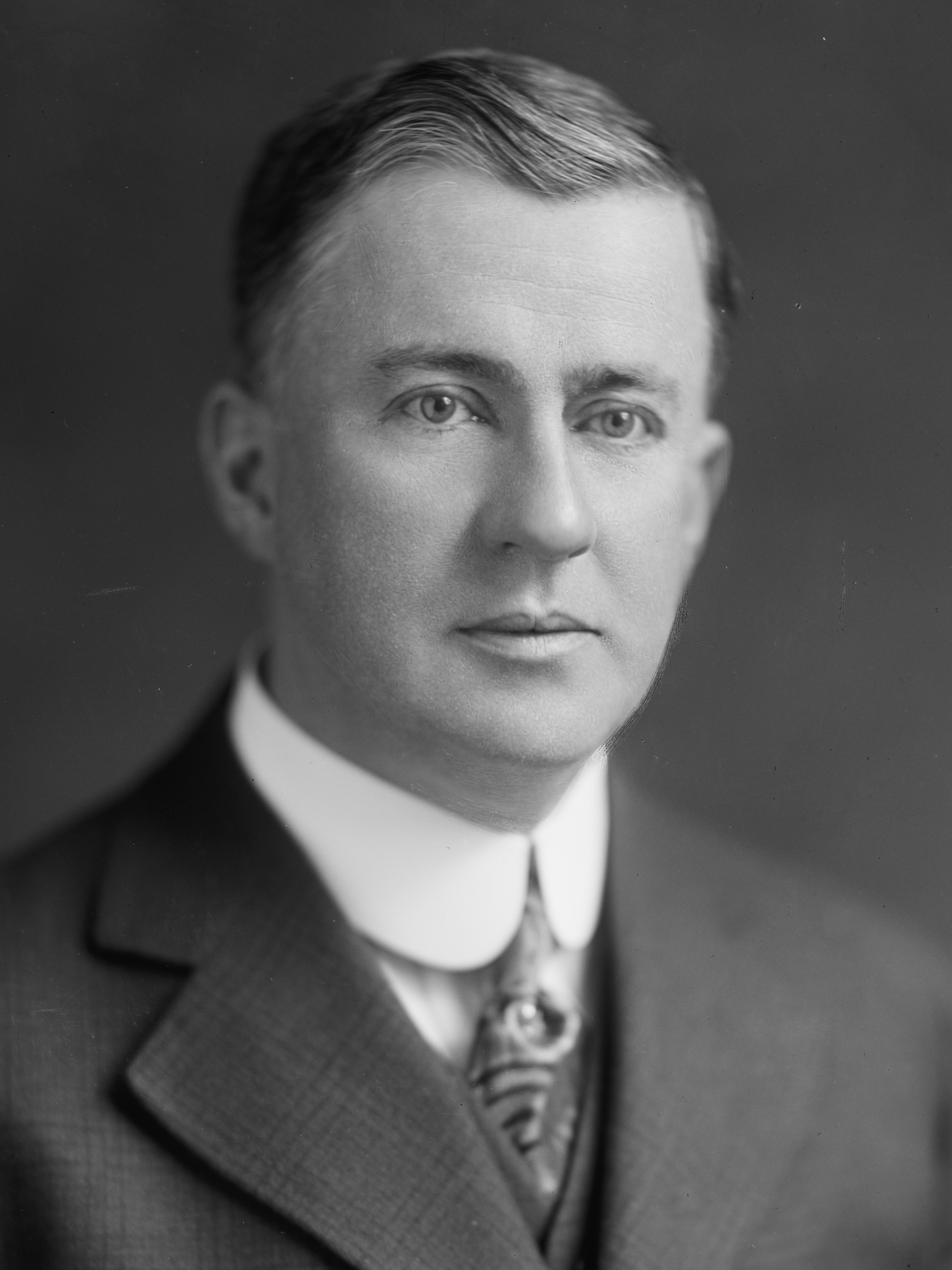
Nominee	Richard P. Ernst	J. C. W. Beckham
Party	Republican	Democratic
Popular vote	454,226	449,244
Percentage	50.28%	49.72%
- County results Ernst: 50–60% 60–70% 70–80% 80–90% >90% Beckham: 50–60% 60–70% 70–80% 80–90%
U.S. senator before election
John C. W. Beckham
Democratic
Elected U.S. Senator
Richard P. Ernst
Republican

The 1920 United States Senate election in Kentucky took place on November 2, 1920. Democratic Senator J. C. W. Beckham ran for re-election to a second term in office but was defeated by Republican attorney Richard P. Ernst.

== General election ==
=== Candidates ===
- J. C. W. Beckham, incumbent Senator since 1915 and former Governor of Kentucky (Democratic)
- Richard P. Ernst, Covington corporate attorney (Republican)

=== Results ===
1920 U.S. Senate election in Kentucky
Party	Candidate	Votes	%	±%
Republican	Richard P. Ernst	454,226	50.28%	
Democratic	J. C. W. Beckham (incumbent)	449,244	49.72%	
Majority		4,982	0.56%	
Total votes		903,470	100.00%	
Republican gain from Democratic				

== See also ==
- 1920 United States Senate elections

== Bibliography ==
- Congressional Elections, 1946-1996. Washington, D.C.: Congressional Quarterly Inc. 1998. ISBN 1-56802-248-4.
- Harrison, Lowell H.; Klotter, James C. (1997). A New History of Kentucky. Lexington, Kentucky: The University Press of Kentucky. ISBN 0-8131-2008-X. Archived from the original on March 8, 2021.
- Jewell, Malcolm E. (1963). Kentucky Votes. Vol. 1. University of Kentucky Press.
- Klotter, James C. (1996). Kentucky: Portraits in Paradox, 1900–1950. Lexington, Kentucky: The University Press of Kentucky. ISBN 0-916968-24-3.
