= 1914 United States Senate elections in Kentucky =

- November 3, 1914
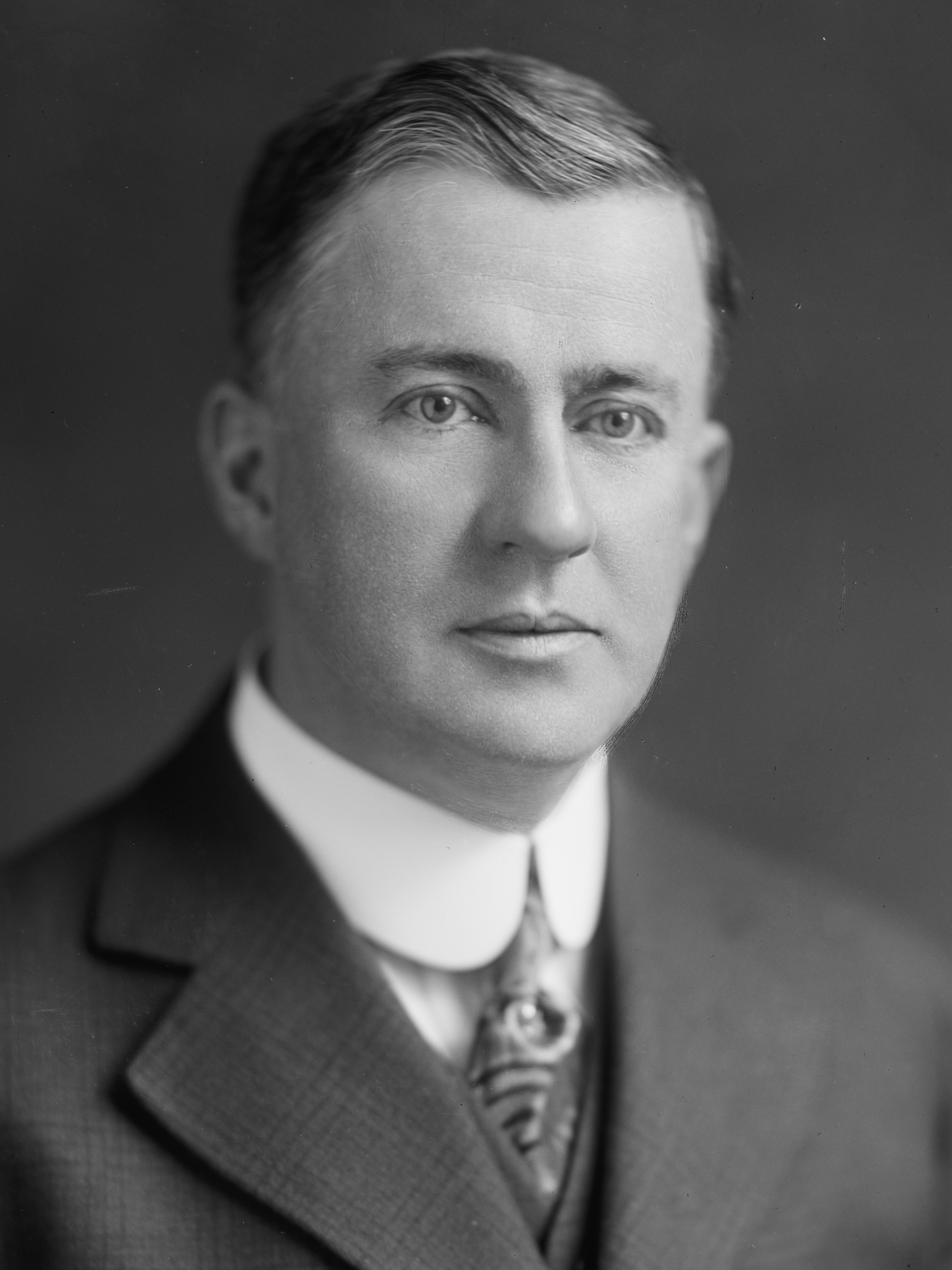

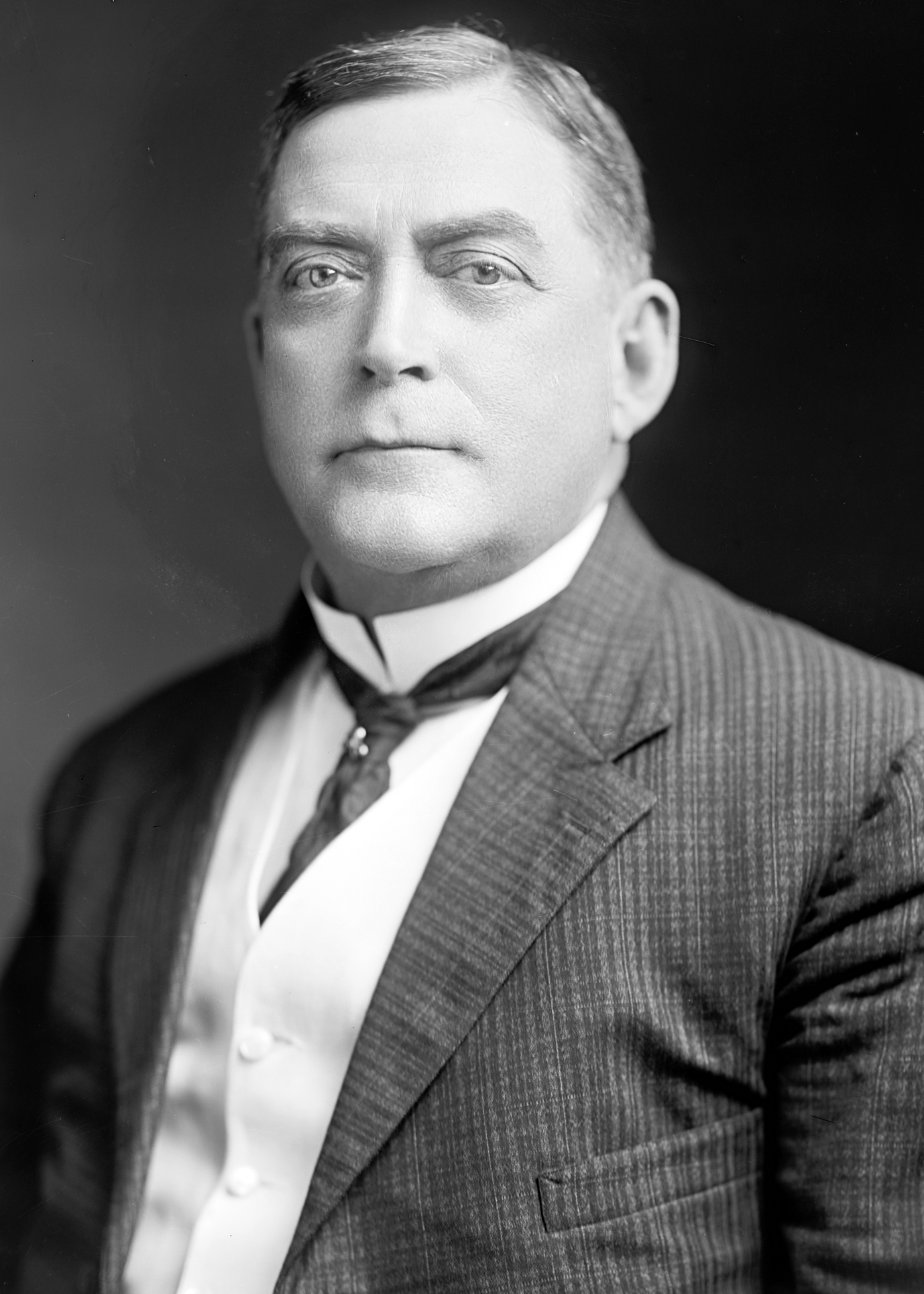
Nominee	J. C. W. Beckham	Augustus E. Willson
Party	Democratic	Republican
Popular vote	176,605	144,758
Percentage	51.89%	42.53%
- County results Beckham: 40–50% 50–60% 60–70% 70–80% 80–90% Willson: 40–50% 50–60% 60–70% 70–80% 80–90% >90%
U.S. Senator before election
Johnson N. Camden Jr.
Democratic
Elected U.S. Senator
J. C. W. Beckham
Democratic

The 1914 United States Senate election in Kentucky took place concurrently on November 3, 1914, alongside a special election to the same seat. Both elections were won by the Democratic candidate, with interim Senator Johnson N. Camden Jr. winning the election to complete the unexpired term of William O'Connell Bradley and former Governor J. C. W. Beckham winning the election for the next full term.

== Background ==
Incumbent Senator William O'Connell Bradley announced his retirement from the Senate on May 14, 1914, and suffered a fall the same day, leading to his death less than two weeks later on May 23, 1914.

Governor James B. McCreary appointed Johnson N. Camden Jr. to fill Bradley's vacant seat until a successor could be duly elected. A special election to complete the unexpired term was scheduled for November 3, concurrent with the regular election to the next term.

== Special election ==
=== Candidates ===
- William Marshall Bullitt, former United States Solicitor General (Republican)
- Johnson N. Camden Jr., interim U.S. Senator (Democratic)
- George Nicholas (Progressive)
- Frank E. Seeds (Socialist)

=== Results ===
1914 U.S. Senate special election in Kentucky
Party	Candidate	Votes	%
Democratic	Johnson N. Camden Jr. (incumbent)	177,797	53.99%
Republican	William Marshall Bullitt	133,139	40.43%
Progressive	George Nicholas	13,641	4.14%
Socialist	Frank E. Seeds	4,770	1.45%
Majority		44,658	13.56
Total votes		329,347	100.00
Democratic hold			

== General election ==
=== Candidates ===
- J. C. W. Beckham, former Governor of Kentucky (Democratic)
- H. J. Robertson (Socialist)
- Burton Vance (Progressive)
- Augustus E. Willson, former Governor of Kentucky (Republican)

=== Results ===
1914 U.S. Senate election in Kentucky
Party	Candidate	Votes	%
Democratic	J. C. W. Beckham	176,605	51.89%
Republican	Augustus E. Willson	144,758	42.53%
Progressive	Burton Vance	14,108	4.15%
Socialist	H. J. Robertson	4,890	1.44%
Majority		31,847	9.36
Total votes		340,361	100.00
Democratic hold			

== See also ==
- 1914 United States Senate elections

== Bibliography ==
- Harrison, Lowell H.; Klotter, James C. (1997). A New History of Kentucky. Lexington, Kentucky: The University Press of Kentucky. ISBN 0-8131-2008-X. Archived from the original on March 8, 2021.
- Jewell, Malcolm E. (1963). Kentucky Votes. Vol. 1. University of Kentucky Press.
- Klotter, James C. (1996). Kentucky: Portraits in Paradox, 1900–1950. Lexington, Kentucky: The University Press of Kentucky. ISBN 0-916968-24-3.
