= Senator Utley =

Senator Utley may refer to:

- Newton Willard Utley (1860–1929), Kentucky State Senate
- William L. Utley (1814–1887), Wisconsin State Senate
