= Senator Ernst =

Senator Ernst may refer to:

- Joni Ernst (born 1970), U.S. Senator from Iowa since 2015
- Richard P. Ernst (1858–1934), U.S. Senator from Kentucky from 1921 to 1927
