= J. C. W. Beckham =

American attorney and politician (1869–1940)

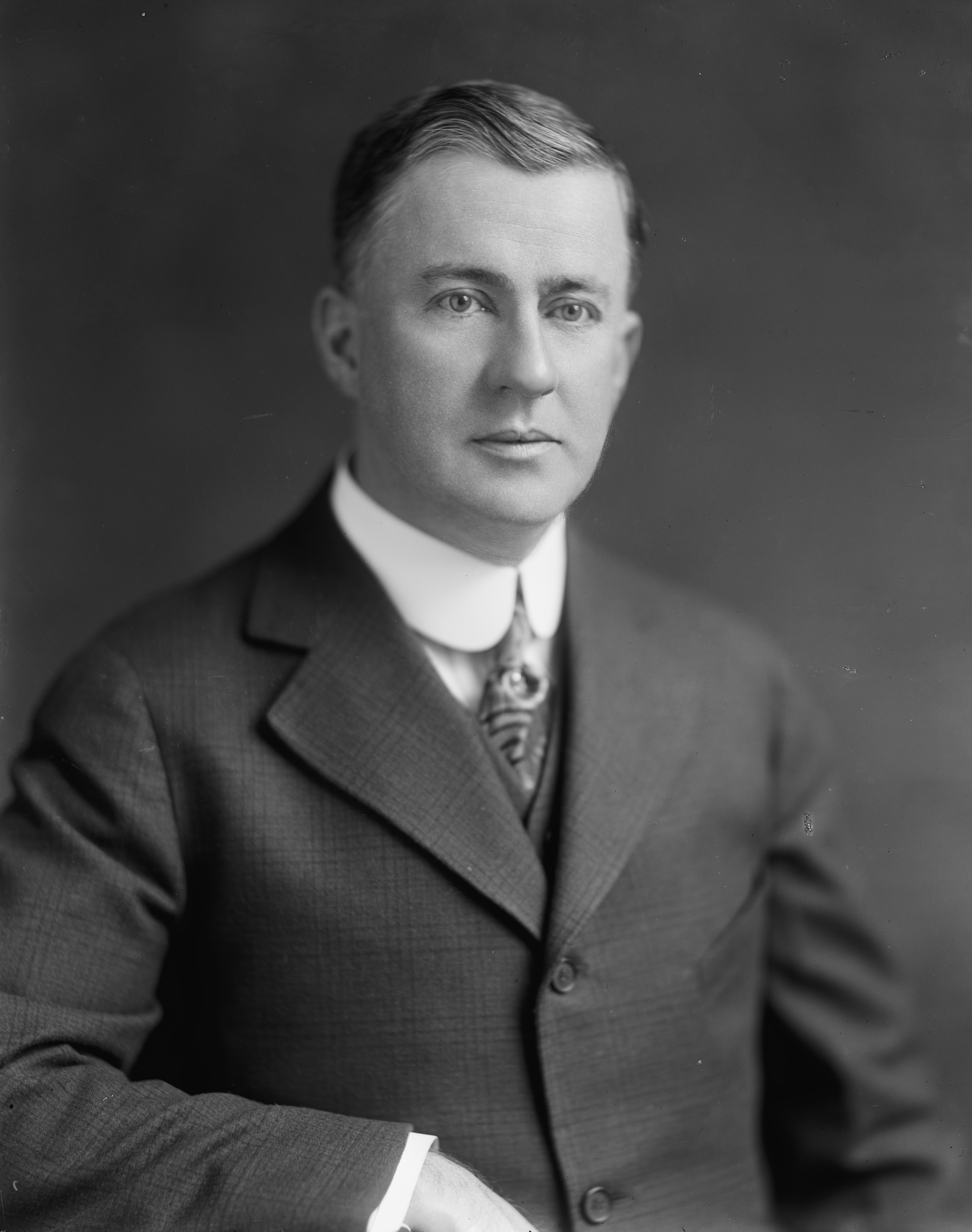
- Beckham, c. 1915

United States Senator from Kentucky
- In office March 4, 1915 – March 3, 1921
- Preceded by: Johnson N. Camden Jr.
- Succeeded by: Richard P. Ernst

35th Governor of Kentucky
- In office February 3, 1900 – December 10, 1907
- Lieutenant: William P. Thorne
- Preceded by: William Goebel
- Succeeded by: Augustus E. Willson

28th Lieutenant Governor of Kentucky
- In office January 31, 1900 – February 3, 1900
- Governor: William Goebel
- Preceded by: John Marshall
- Succeeded by: Lillard H. Carter (acting)

55th Speaker of the Kentucky House of Representatives
- In office January 4, 1898 – January 1, 1900
- Preceded by: Charles Blandford
- Succeeded by: South Trimble

Member of the Kentucky House of Representatives from the 39th district
- In office February 5, 1896 – January 1, 1900
- Preceded by: Isaac Wilson
- Succeeded by: Eli H. Brown
- In office January 1, 1894 – January 1, 1896
- Preceded by: A. L. Harned
- Succeeded by: Isaac Wilson

Personal details
- Born: John Crepps Wickliffe Beckham; August 5, 1869 Wickland, Kentucky, U.S.
- Died: January 9, 1940 (aged 70) Louisville, Kentucky, U.S.
- Resting place: Frankfort Cemetery
- Party: Democratic
- Spouse: Jean Raphael Fuqua
- Children: 2
- Relatives: Charles A. Wickliffe (grandfather); Robert C. Wickliffe (uncle)
- Education: Central University; University of Kentucky
- Profession: Politician; lawyer

John Crepps Wickliffe Beckham (August 5, 1869 – January 9, 1940) was an American attorney and politician who served as the 35th governor of Kentucky and a United States senator from Kentucky. He was the state's first popularly-elected senator after the passage of the Seventeenth Amendment.

Descended from a prominent political family, Beckham was chosen as the running mate of Democratic nominee William Goebel in the 1899 Kentucky gubernatorial election. Although Goebel lost the election to Republican nominee William S. Taylor, the Kentucky General Assembly disputed the election results. During the political wrangling that followed, an unknown assassin shot Goebel. A day later, the General Assembly invalidated enough votes to give the election to Goebel, who was sworn into office on his deathbed. Taylor claimed the election had been stolen by the Democratic majority in the General Assembly, and a legal fight occurred between him and Beckham over the governorship. Beckham ultimately prevailed and Taylor fled the state. Beckham later won a special election to fill the remainder of Goebel's term and then an election in his own right in 1903.

In 1906, during his second term as governor, Beckham made a bid to become a U.S. senator. His favorable stance of prohibition cost him the votes of four legislators in his own party, and in 1908, the General Assembly gave the seat to Republican William O. Bradley. In 1914, Beckham secured the seat by popular election, but lost his re-election bid in 1920, largely due to his pro-temperance views and opposition to women's suffrage. He continued to play an active role in state politics for another two decades, but never returned to elected office, failing both in his 1927 gubernatorial bid and his 1936 senatorial campaign. He died in Louisville in 1940.

According to one study, Beckham represented “the more liberal elements” of the Kentucky Democratic Party.

== Early life ==
He was born in Wickland, near Bardstown in Nelson County, Kentucky, son of William Netherton and Julia Tevis (Wickliffe) Beckham. His maternal grandfather, Charles A. Wickliffe, was governor of Kentucky from 1839 to 1840 and served as postmaster general in the administration of John Tyler. His uncle, Robert C. Wickliffe, served as governor of Louisiana.

Beckham obtained his early education at Roseland Academy in Bardstown. In 1881, he served as a page in the Kentucky House of Representatives at 12. Later, he enrolled at Central University (now Eastern Kentucky University) in Richmond, Kentucky, but was forced to quit school at 17 to support his widowed mother. Two years later, he became principal of Bardstown public schools, from 1888 to 1893.

Concurrently, he studied law at the University of Kentucky, where he earned his law degree in 1889. He was admitted to the bar and commenced practice in Bardstown in 1893. He also served as president of the Young Democrats' Club of Nelson County.

== Political career ==
Beckham's political career began in 1893, when he was elected without opposition to the Kentucky House of Representatives. He served four consecutive terms and was its Speaker in 1898, his final year in the House. He also served as a delegate to every Democratic National Convention from 1900 to 1920.

=== Governor of Kentucky ===
Democrat William Goebel chose Beckham as his running mate in the Kentucky gubernatorial election of 1899. Goebel was hesitant about the selection because he wanted someone who could deliver the vote of his home county in the general election, and Beckham's native Nelson County was already committed to a rival candidate. However, friends of Goebel assured him that Beckham would be loyal to Goebel's reform agenda, but the two other men Goebel was considering as running mates would "stack the Senate committees against him." Beckham was not yet 30, the minimum age to serve as governor, at the time of his selection.

Goebel lost a close election to Republican William S. Taylor. When the General Assembly's session opened on January 2, 1900, the election results were immediately challenged. With Democrats in control of both houses of the Assembly, the results seemed sure to be reversed. The Assembly was still deliberating on January 30, 1900, when Goebel was shot by an unknown assailant as he entered the state capitol building. The following day, as Goebel was being treated for his wounds at a local hotel, the General Assembly invalidated enough votes to give him the election. Goebel was sworn into office from his bed the same day. Three days later, Goebel died, never having risen from the bed.

Legislative chaos ensued, as Taylor refused to acknowledge the Assembly's decision and vacate the governorship. The Republicans in the legislature obeyed Taylor's orders, but the Democrats ignored Taylor and followed the orders of their leadership. Finally, on February 21, 1900, Taylor and Beckham agreed to let the courts settle the matter. The case first went before the Louisville Circuit Court, which found in favor of Beckham. Republicans appealed to the Kentucky Court of Appeals, then the court of last resort in the state. On April 6, 1900, the Court of Appeals upheld the ruling of the lower court. Taylor appealed to the US Supreme Court, which declined to hear the case on May 21, 1900. Taylor's only supporter on the court was John Marshall Harlan, from Kentucky.

After the Supreme Court ruling, Taylor fled to Indianapolis, Indiana, fearing he would be implicated in Goebel's assassination. Beckham remained governor, but because of the unusual circumstances surrounding the election, a special election was held on November 6, 1900, to determine who would complete Goebel's unexpired term. Beckham, now of age, won the election over Republican John W. Yerkes by fewer than 4,000 votes. Shortly afterward, Beckham married Jean Raphael Fuqua, of Owensboro. The couple had two sons.

As governor, Beckham sought to unite his party and the state by supporting changes to the blatantly-partisan Goebel Election Law, which had been authored by his late running mate while the latter was a member of the General Assembly. He stressed non-controversial issues, such as improvements to roads and the state's educational system. He recommended passage of a law to set uniform school textbook prices, a reform that both he and Goebel had advocated during the gubernatorial campaign. However, his passive leadership ensured that the General Assembly did little to address his agenda. Nevertheless, a number of positive reforms were realized during Beckham's term as governor. Amongst others, these included a tax increase that added a half million dollars to the state's revenue and a child labor law that forbade children under fourteen to work without their parents' consent. A bill was also passed that regulated the payment of wages to coal miners, while an administration measure was approved that aimed to improve protections for those employed in the coal mining industry.

While seeking renomination in 1902, Beckham defended the record of the Democrats in Kentucky, arguing that the state was prospering under Democratic administration, and that “No one man is entitled to the credit of this improved condition of affairs, but surely the progressive spirit and liberal policy of the Democratic party has done its part to bring it about.”

=== Second term ===
Although the Kentucky Constitution prohibited governors from serving consecutive terms, Beckham announced that he would seek a full term as governor in 1903. His candidacy was challenged in court, but the court ruled Beckham had not served a full first term and so was eligible to run. His record of reconciliation and of supporting non-controversial reforms prevented significant opposition when he won the party's nomination. His record also deprived his Republican opponent, Morris B. Belknap, of any significant campaign issue in the general election. Beckham defeated Belknap and three minor candidates.

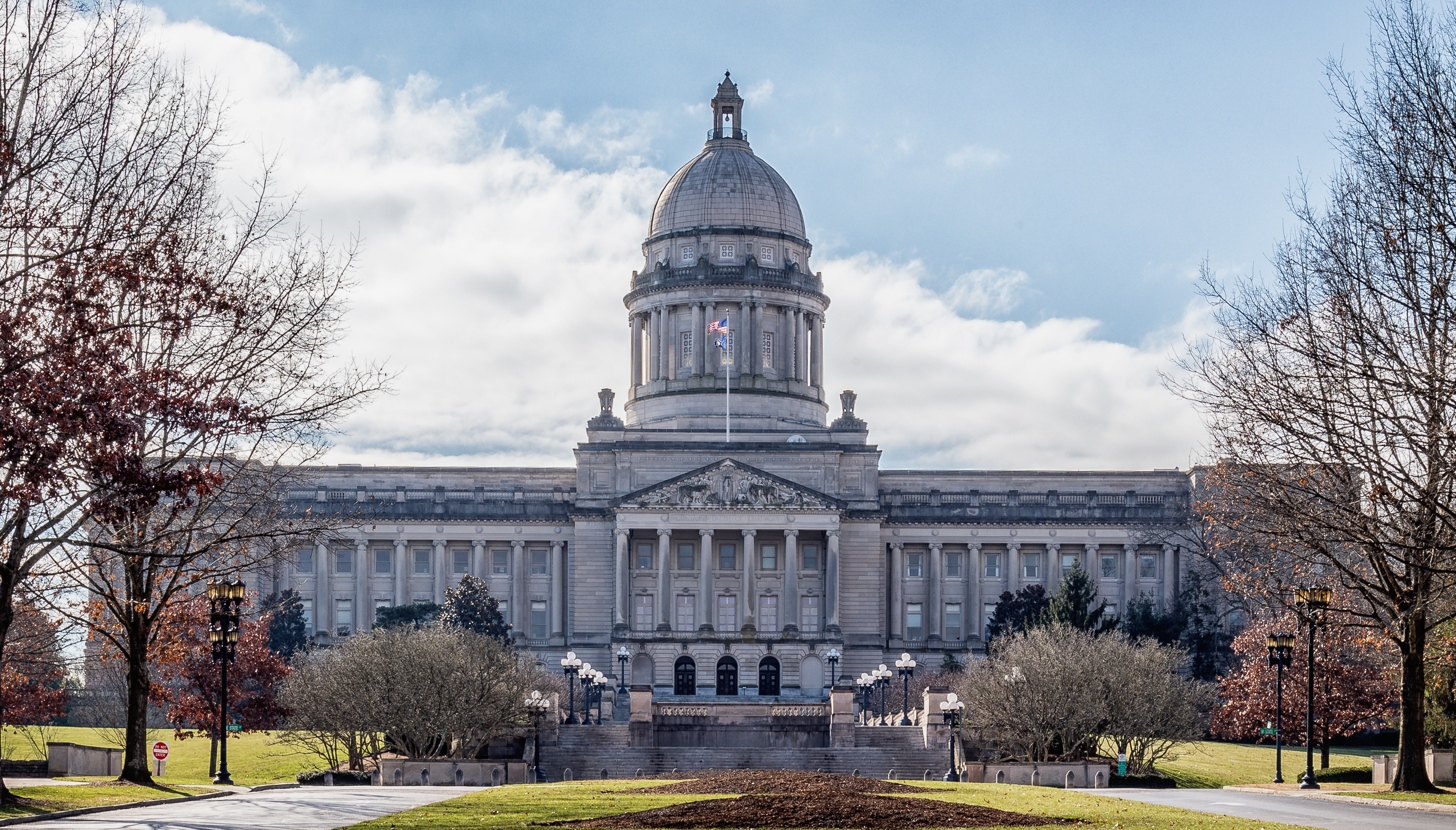
Funds were allocated for the construction of Kentucky's current capitol during Beckham's second term.

In his message to the legislature in 1904, Beckham again raised the issue of a uniform school textbook law, which had not passed during his first term. The law was one of few significant reforms that passed during the 1904 session. Also during the session, funds were approved for building a new capitol building and a memorial to the late Governor Goebel.

In March 1904, Beckham signed the Day Law, mandating racial segregation of all schools in Kentucky. Berea College, a private college in eastern Kentucky that had been integrated since the 1850s, immediately filed suit to challenge the law. Its substance was upheld in the circuit court and the Kentucky Court of Appeals. Berea appealed to the Supreme Court, which, in 1908, which decided, in Berea College v. Kentucky, against the college. Again, only Harlan dissented.

Near the close of the 1904 session, legislators approved the creation of Beckham County from parts of Carter, Elliott, and Lewis Counties. Olive Hill was made the county seat. Soon, the county's existence was challenged in court on grounds that it fell short of the 400 square miles (1,000 km^{2}) required by the state constitution and that it reduced the counties from which it was carved to less than 400 square miles (1,000 km^{2}). Carter County joined the lawsuit, claiming the border of Beckham County passed too close to Grayson, the seat of Carter County, and to Vanceburg, the seat of Lewis County. The state constitution forbade county borders from passing within 10 miles (16 km) of a county seat. On April 29, 1904, the Kentucky Court of Appeals found in favor of the plaintiffs and dissolved Beckham County. However, Beckham County, Oklahoma, was named in his honor at the suggestion of a Kentuckian who was serving as a delegate to Oklahoma's constitutional convention for statehood in 1907.

During the 1906 legislative session, Beckham urged investigation and prosecution of corrupt insurance companies by following the lead of New York attorney Charles Evans Hughes. In particular, he recommended reducing the practice of deferred dividends, which allowed the insurance companies to keep large stores of cash on hand for illegal purposes. He further advocated for insurance companies doing business in the state to be required to invest a certain percentage of their earnings in Kentucky to bolstering the state's economy and to provide policyholders some protection against fraud.

Beckham refused to send troops into the western part of the state to quell the ongoing Black Patch Tobacco Wars. He cited constitutional reasons for his refusal, but more probably, his reasons were political. The Democrats were dominant in the region, and he wanted to avoid challenging his own party.

By collecting some old US Civil War debts from the federal government, Beckham also virtually eliminated the state's debt. Encouraged by the state's improved finances, the General Assembly voted to expand two of the state's normal schools: Western State Teachers College in Bowling Green (later Western Kentucky University) and Eastern State Teachers College in Richmond (later part of Eastern Kentucky University).

With a successful legislative session behind him, Beckham made a bold political move in June 1906. He orchestrated an effort to set the Democratic gubernatorial and senatorial primaries in November, a full year before the gubernatorial election and two years before the senatorial election. Beckham wanted the Senate seat, and if the primary was moved up two years, he could secure his party's nomination while he was still governor. He could also use his influence as governor to sway the party's choice of his potential successor as governor. State Auditor Samuel Wilber Hager was Beckham's choice for governor and easily won the early primary over challenger N.B. Hays. Former Governor James B. McCreary challenged Beckham for the senatorial nomination, but Beckham won by more than 11,000 votes.

=== U.S. Senator ===
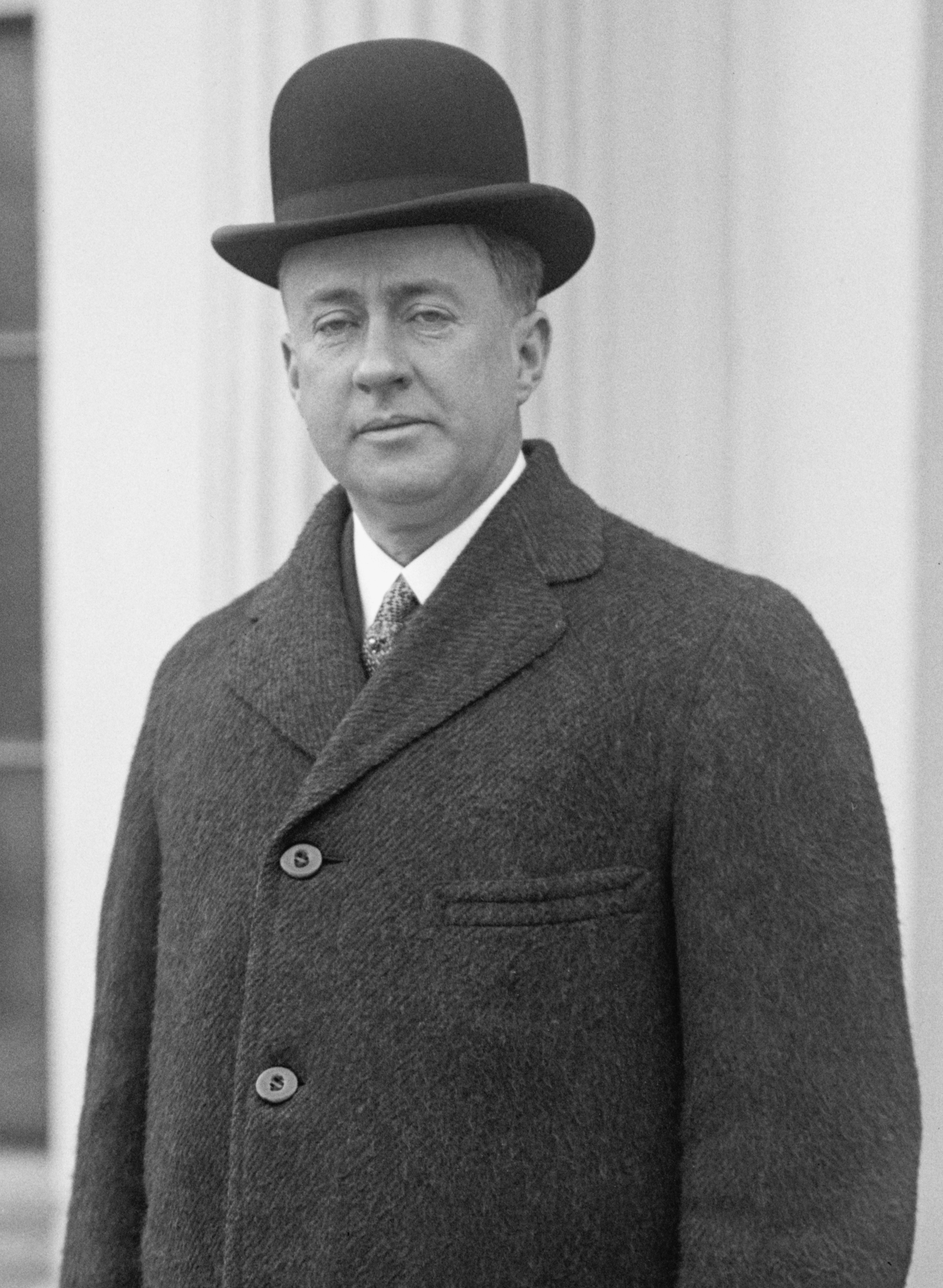
Beckham as a U.S. Senator

Beckham's term as governor ended on December 10, 1907. In January 1908, he faced the legislature as the Democratic nominee for a seat in the US Senate by virtue of the primary that had been held two years earlier. The Republicans nominated former Governor William O. Bradley. On the first ballot, Beckham secured 66 of the needed 69 votes; Bradley received 64 votes. Seven Democrats had not voted for Beckham. Over the next six weeks, 25 more votes were taken, with neither man securing a majority, even though William Jennings Bryan, the Democratic nominee for president, campaigned for Beckham. Some Democrats pressured Beckham to withdraw and to allow a more palatable Democrat to run, but he refused. On the 29th ballot, taken near the end of February 1908, Bradley finally secured a majority, after four Democrats crossed party lines to vote for him.

Beckham's ardent support of Prohibition likely cost him the election. That put him at odds with Henry Watterson, editor of the powerful Louisville Courier-Journal. As governor Beckham had crossed the liquor interests and the political machine in Louisville. When the Kentucky Court of Appeals invalidated the results of Louisville's municipal elections for interference by the city's "whiskey ring" in May 1907, Beckham appointed Robert Worth Bingham, a young lawyer and fellow prohibitionist, as the interim mayor until elections could be held in November. Bingham eliminated grafting in the police department, closed gambling houses, and enforced blue laws that closed saloons on Sunday. The whiskey ring, therefore, announced that Beckham had forfeited the support of Louisville's legislators. In the senatorial election in 1908, three of the four Democrats who voted against Beckham were from Louisville. Following his defeat, Beckham returned to his law practice.

Six years later, Beckham again attempted to win a Senate seat. The passage of the Seventeenth Amendment meant that the Senate would no longer be elected by the legislature but instead by popular vote.

In the Democratic primary, Beckham defeated Augustus O. Stanley, a 12-year veteran of the House of Representatives. The Republican nominee was former Governor Augustus E. Willson. Bolstered by his support of President Woodrow Wilson, Beckham won the election by 32,000 votes.

Beckham served as chairman of the Senate Committee on Expenditures in the US Department of Labor from 1915 to 1917 and on the Senate Committee on Military Affairs. In the latter position, he was influential in securing two large military training posts for Kentucky: Camp Zachary Taylor and Fort Knox. Though Camp Zachary Taylor was abandoned after World War I, Fort Knox became the home of the US Bullion Depository.

After the United States entered World War I, Beckham continued to back Wilson and later supported the League of Nations.

True to his prohibitionist stance, Beckham supported passage of the Eighteenth Amendment, which enacted Prohibition in the United States. The amendment was ratified and became effective in January 1920. Believing that women should be protected from involvement in politics, Beckham opposed the Nineteenth Amendment, which granted women's suffrage. The amendment failed on February 10, 1919, but passed on June 4. Beckham voted against it both times.

The Democrats renominated Beckham without opposition in 1920. His opponent in the general election was Republican Richard P. Ernst. Prohibition had destroyed the distilling industry and the saloon business in the state, and in areas that those industries were prominent, Beckham received more than 5,000 fewer votes than Democratic presidential nominee James M. Cox. He was also hurt by the women's vote and by his support of Wilson, who had lost popularity since Beckham's election, in 1914. Ernst won the election by fewer than 5,000 votes, winning the race with 50.3% of the vote to Beckham's 49.7%.

During his only term in the Senate, Beckham served alongside three other U.S. senators from Kentucky: Ollie M. James, George B. Martin, and Augustus O. Stanley.

== Later life ==
After his term in the Senate ended, Beckham resumed his legal practice in Louisville. He sought another term as governor in 1927. This time, he had the support of the Louisville Courier-Journal, which had been purchased by his ally, Robert W. Bingham. He was opposed by a powerful political machine, known as the Jockey Club, whose main interest was securing legislation to allow parimutuel betting at the state's horse racetracks.

The Jockey Club ran a candidate in both parties' primary elections. In the Democratic primary, Beckham defeated the club's relatively-obscure candidate, Robert T. Crowe. Flem D. Sampson, the club's nominee in the Republican primary, won his party's nomination. In the general election, Beckham could not secure the support of Democratic Governor William J. Fields, who had been elected with the help of the Jockey Club. Despite the Democrats winning every other contest on the ballot, including the race for lieutenant governor, Beckham lost to Sampson by more than 32,000 votes, with voting fraud suspected but never proved. It was estimated that the club spent over $500,000 to defeat him.

Beckham was expected to be the Democrats' nominee for governor in 1935, but the death of his son in late 1934 had left him distraught, and his wife was opposed to another campaign. The Democrats turned to A. B. "Happy" Chandler, of Versailles, who won the election. Beckham supported Chandler's bid, and in return, Chandler appointed him to the Kentucky Public Service Commission in 1936. Beckham also served on the Department of Business Regulations Commission and chaired the State Government Reorganization Commission.

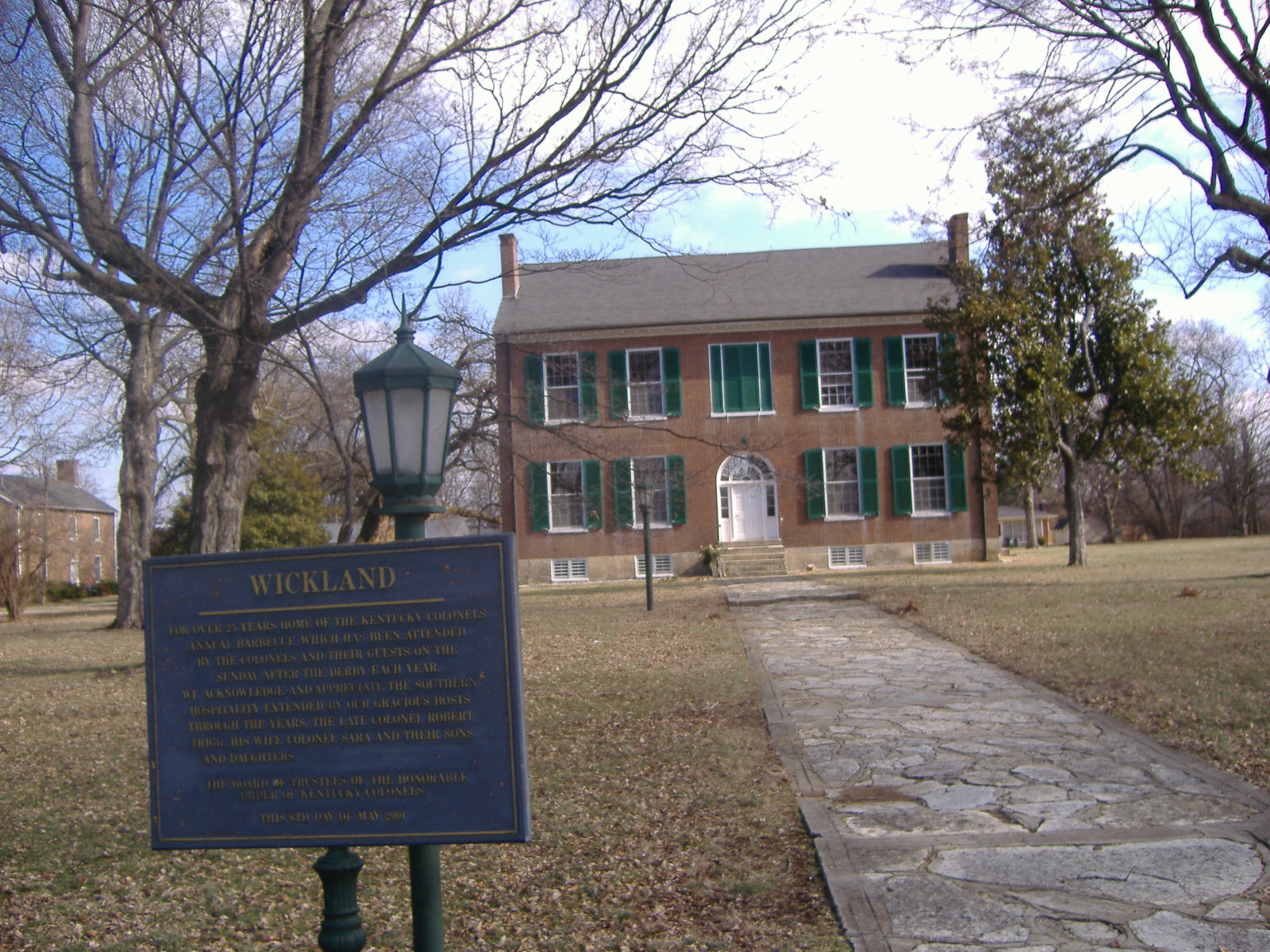
Wickland, Beckham's birthplace, is on the National Register of Historic Places

Beckham attempted to return to the Senate in 1936. The head of the Jockey Club, James B. Brown, had lost his fortune and influence when his banking empire crashed in 1930.

In 1933, Beckham's ally, Bingham, had been appointed ambassador to the Court of St. James's, in London, increasing his prominence and his influence. Beckham also enjoyed the support of the United Mine Workers and Louisville Mayor Neville Miller. The race was complicated, however, by the entry of John Y. Brown, a U.S. Democratic Representative and former Speaker of the Kentucky House of Representatives. He had agreed to support Chandler's bid for the governorship in exchange for Chandler's support in his run for the Senate. However, Chandler threw his support to Beckham, and while Brown was not able to win the seat without the support of Bingham and Chandler, he won 85,000 votes, most of them at Beckham's expense. Democratic incumbent M. M. Logan retained the seat by 2,385 votes.

Beckham died in Louisville on January 9, 1940, and was buried in Frankfort Cemetery in Frankfort, Kentucky. Wickland, his birthplace and that of two other governors, was added to the National Register of Historic Places on February 16, 1973.

== See also ==
- Taylor v. Beckham

== Sources ==
- Harrison, Lowell H.; James C. Klotter (1997). A New History of Kentucky. University Press of Kentucky. ISBN 0-8131-2008-X.
- Tapp, Hambleton; James C. Klotter (1977). Kentucky: decades of discord, 1865–1900. University Press of Kentucky. ISBN 0-916968-05-7.

Political offices
Preceded by William Goebel	Governor of Kentucky; 1900–1907	Succeeded by Augustus E. Willson
Preceded by John Marshall	Lieutenant Governor of Kentucky; 1900	Succeeded by William P. Thorne
Party political offices
Preceded by William Goebel	Democratic nominee for Governor of Kentucky; 1900, 1903	Succeeded by Samuel Wilber Hager
Preceded by Johnson N. Camden Jr.	Democratic nominee for U.S. Senator from Kentucky (Class 3); 1914, 1920	Succeeded by Alben W. Barkley
Preceded by William J. Fields	Democratic nominee for Governor of Kentucky; 1927	Succeeded by Ruby Laffoon
U.S. Senate
Preceded by Johnson N. Camden Jr.	United States Senator (Class 3) from Kentucky; March 4, 1915 – March 3, 1921	Succeeded by Richard P. Ernst
