= 1900 Kentucky gubernatorial special election =

- November 6, 1900
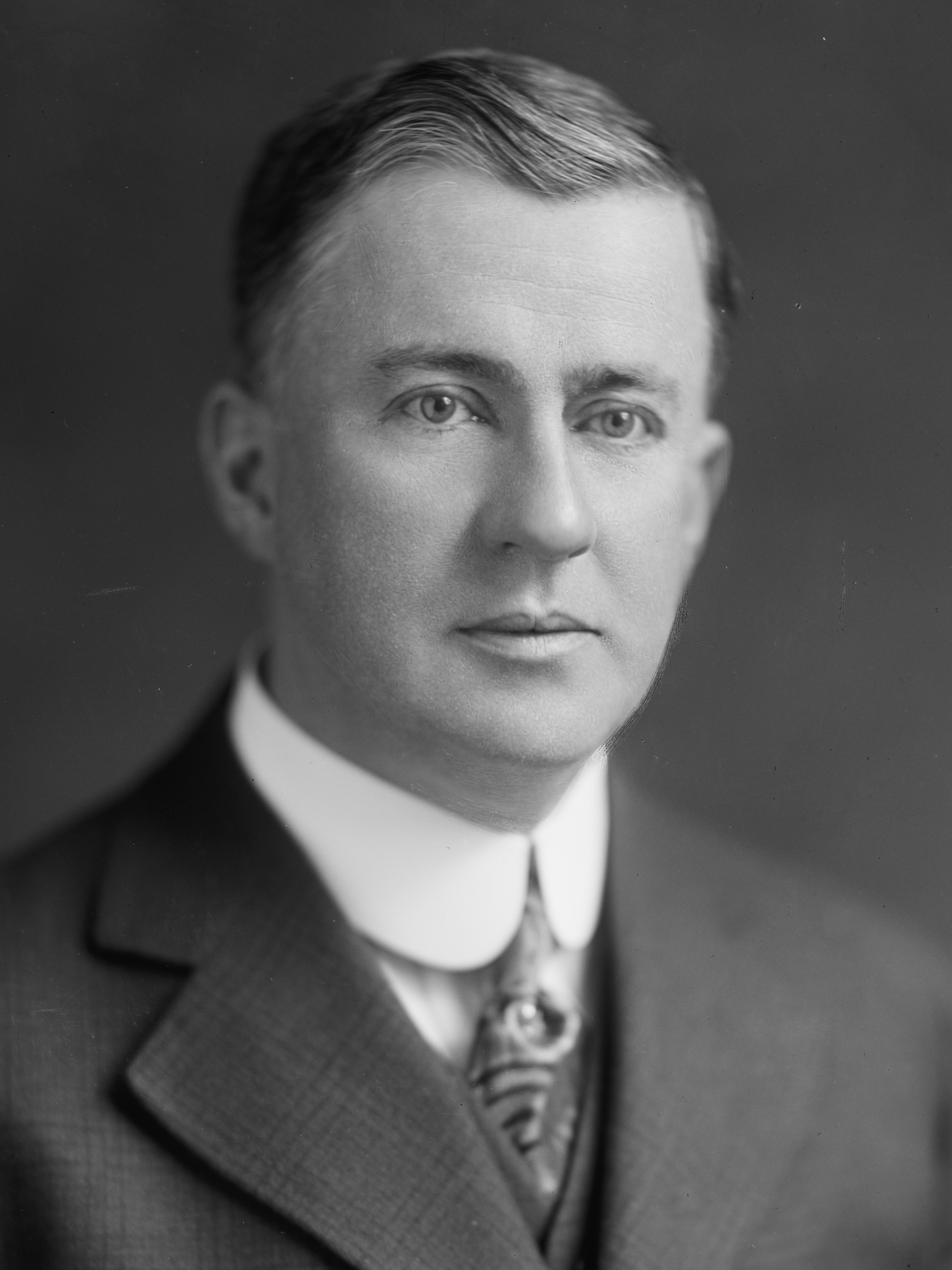

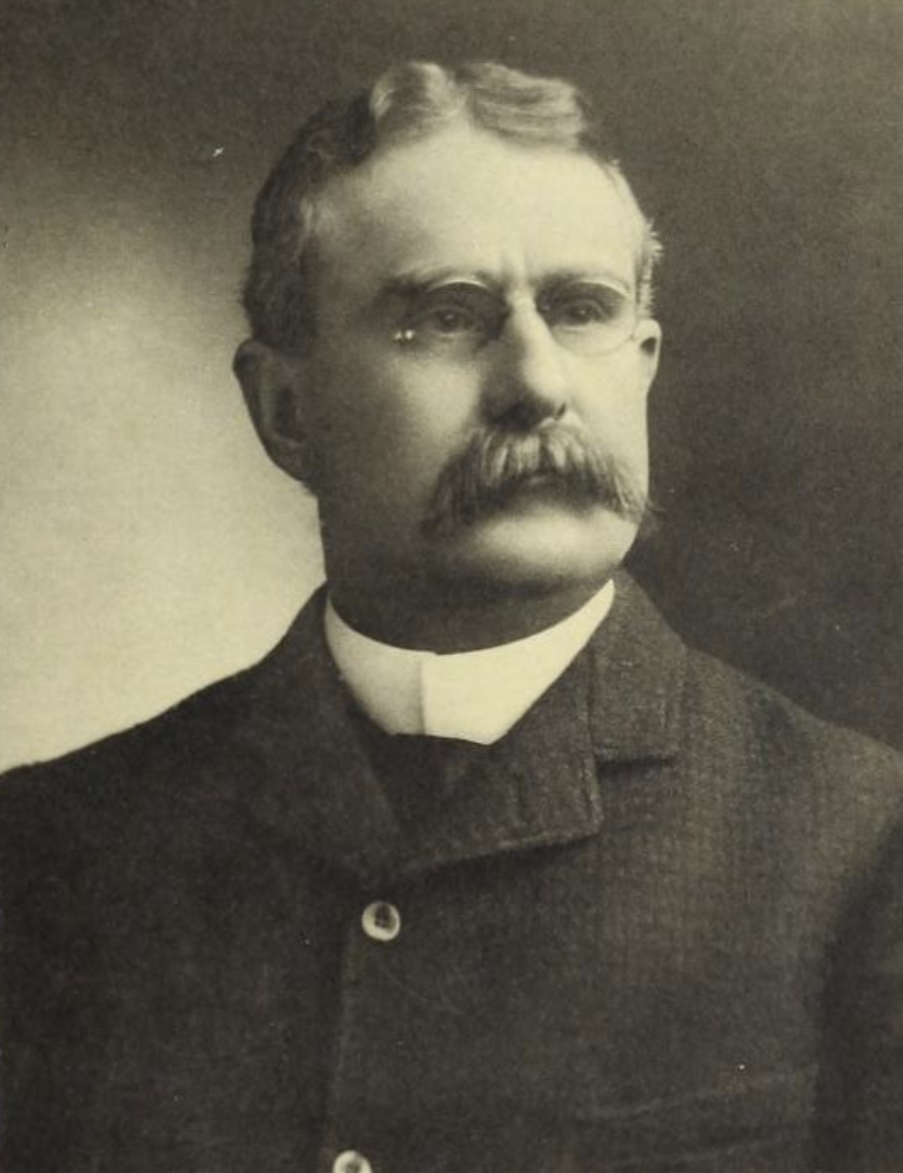
| Nominee | J. C. W. Beckham | John W. Yerkes |
| Party | Democratic | Republican |
| Popular vote | 233,052 | 229,363 |
| Percentage | 49.88% | 49.09% |
- Beckham: 40–50% 50–60% 60–70% 70–80% Yerkes: 40–50% 50–60% 60–70% 70–80% 80–90% >90%
Governor before election
J. C. W. Beckham
Democratic
Elected Governor
J. C. W. Beckham
Democratic

The 1900 Kentucky gubernatorial special election was held on November 6, 1900. Incumbent Democratic governor J. C. W. Beckham was elected to complete William Goebel's term with 49.88% of the vote.

== Background ==
In the 1899 Kentucky gubernatorial election, J. C. W. Beckham was the running mate of Democratic nominee William Goebel, who lost the election to Republican nominee William S. Taylor. On January 31, 1900, Democrats in the Kentucky General Assembly successfully overturned the election results, handing the governorship to Goebel. However, having been shot the day before, he died three days later, so Beckham ascended to the governorship.

== General election ==
=== Candidates ===
- J. C. W. Beckham, Democratic, incumbent governor
- John W. Yerkes, Republican, member of the Republican National Committee, former Republican state chairman, former collector of internal revenue for Kentucky's 8th district
- A. H. Cardin, Populist, farmer, chairman of the Kentucky state central committee, Union Labor candidate for governor in 1887
- James Doyle, Socialist Labor
- Walter T. Roberts, Social Democrat, physician
- John D. White, Prohibition, lawyer, former U.S. representative

=== Campaign ===
Due to the unusual circumstances surrounding the 1899 election, a special election was held on November 6, 1900, to determine who would complete Goebel's unexpired term. Beckham won the election over Republican John W. Yerkes by 3,689 votes.

=== Results ===
1900 Kentucky gubernatorial special election (Note: Some sources give the result as Beckham 233,197, Yerkes 229,468, White 2,130, Cardin 1,705, Roberts 593, Doyle 357. The result given here is that given in the 1902 Kentucky State Manual. Contemporary sources also mention a number of scattering votes.)
| Party | Candidate | Votes | % | ±% |
|---|---|---|---|---|
| Democratic | J. C. W. Beckham (incumbent) | 233,052 | 49.88% | |
| Republican | John W. Yerkes | 229,363 | 49.09% | |
| Prohibition | John D. White | 2,269 | 0.49% | |
| Populist | A. H. Cardin | 1,666 | 0.36% | |
| Social Democratic | Walter T. Roberts | 456 | 0.10% | |
| Socialist Labor | James Doyle | 408 | 0.09% | |
| Majority | | 3,689 | 0.79% | |
| Turnout | | 467,214 | | |
| Democratic hold | | Swing | | |

== Bibliography ==
- Gubernatorial Elections, 1787–1997. Congressional Quarterly. 1998. ISBN 978-1-56802-396-0.
- Burckel, Nicholas C. (1978). "From Beckham to McCreary: The Progressive Record of Kentucky Governors". The Register of the Kentucky Historical Society. 76 (4): 285–306. JSTOR 23378562.
- Dubin, Michael J. (2010). United States Gubernatorial Elections, 1861–1911: The Official Results by State and County. McFarland & Company. ISBN 978-0-7864-4722-0.
- Glashan, Roy R. (1979). American Governors and Gubernatorial Elections, 1775–1978. Vol. 1. Meckler Books. ISBN 978-0-930466-17-6.
- Hardin, Pauline Helm (1902). Official Manual for the Use of the Courts, State and County Officials and General Assembly of the State of Kentucky. Geo. G. Fetter Printing Co.
- Harrison, Lowell H. (1992). Kleber, John E. (ed.). The Kentucky Encyclopedia. University Press of Kentucky. ISBN 978-0-8131-1772-0.
- Harrison, Lowell H., ed. (2004). Kentucky's Governors (PDF). University Press of Kentucky. ISBN 978-0-8131-2326-4.
- Kallenbach, Joseph E.; Kallenbach, Jessamine S., eds. (1977). American State Governors, 1776–1976. Vol. 1. Oceana Publications. ISBN 978-0-379-00665-0.
- Klotter, James C. (1977). William Goebel: The Politics of Wrath. University Press of Kentucky. ISBN 978-0-8131-0240-5.
