= Newton Willard Utley =

American politician who was Acting Lieutenant Governor of Kentucky

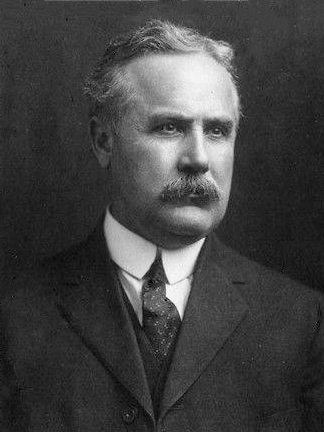
- Newton Willard Utley

Acting Lieutenant Governor of Kentucky
- In office January 7, 1902 – December 8, 1903
- Governor: J. C. W. Beckham
- Preceded by: Lillard H. Carter (acting)
- Succeeded by: William P. Thorne

President pro tempore of the Kentucky Senate
- In office January 7, 1902 – January 1, 1904
- Preceded by: Lillard H. Carter
- Succeeded by: J. Embry Allen

Member of the Kentucky Senate from the 3rd district
- In office January 1, 1900 – January 1, 1904
- Preceded by: Fenton Sims
- Succeeded by: J. W. Gilbert

Personal details
- Born: May 12, 1860 Marshall County, Kentucky, U.S.
- Died: May 24, 1929 (aged 69) Eddyville, Kentucky, U.S.
- Resting place: Eddyville Cemetery
- Party: Democratic
- Spouse: Mary S. Childers (m. 1890)
- Children: 3
- Parent(s): William Washington Utley; Sarah Ann Childers
- Education: Vanderbilt University

Newton Willard Utley Sr. (May 12, 1860 – May 24, 1929) was an American lawyer and politician from the Commonwealth of Kentucky. A Democrat, he served as acting lieutenant governor of Kentucky under J. C. W. Beckham from 1902 to 1903, a member of the Kentucky Senate from 1900 to 1904, and president pro tempore of the Kentucky Senate from 1902 to 1904. Before becoming involved in politics, he was a missionary in Japan and helped establish Kwansei Gakuin University.

== Early life and education ==
Newton Willard Utley was born to William Washington Utley and Sarah Ann Holland on May 12, 1860. The Utleys were farmers in Marshall County, Kentucky. He attended the local one-room schoolhouse and later worked as a schoolteacher for about four years in Marshall, Hickman, and Fulton counties. He moved to Nashville, Tennessee, and enrolled in Vanderbilt University, where he graduated with a Graduate of Theology Degree in 1887. After graduating, he continued to attend the university for another year, doing post-graduate work in sciences and modern languages. He married Sarah S. Childers on July 9, 1890; the couple had three children, Newton Willard Jr., Francis W., and Merill Holland.

== Career ==
Utley was a missionary in Japan with the Methodist Episcopal Church, South. While in Japan, he established the Kwansei Gakuin University in Kobe. He lived in Japan until his health began to fail, compelling him to return to Kentucky. In 1893, he returned to Japan, traveling across the southern part of the country, establishing mission stations along the way. In 1896, on account of the failing health of his wife, he returned to Kentucky.

After returning from Japan, Utley moved to Eddyville, where he opened a law practice. In 1897, he was admitted to the Kentucky Bar Association, and served as vice-president of the association for several years. During this time, Utley became involved in banking, and worked at several banks in Lyon County, including the Citizens Bank in Kuttawa, Kentucky, where he served as vice-president, and director of the First State Bank in Eddyville.

=== Political career ===
In 1899, Utley was elected as a Democrat to the Kentucky Senate, representing the 3rd district, which comprised Lyon, Livingston, Calloway, and Trigg counties. He assumed office in 1900. On the morning of January 30, 1900, Governor William Goebel was shot by an assassin. He died three days later, pushing the state on the verge of civil war. According to author and historian William Elsey Connelley, Utley was one of the most influential members of the senate during the chaotic sessions of 1900 and 1902. In 1902, Utley was appointed by his peers to be president pro tempore of the Kentucky Senate, which made him ex officio lieutenant governor of Kentucky under J. C. W. Beckham from 1902 to 1903. Other members of his party encouraged him to run for a full term as lieutenant governor in the 1903 elections, but he declined, instead deciding to retire.

== Later life and death ==
In late 1928, Utley traveled to Florida, seeking treatment for his failing health. He returned to Kentucky six months later. After his return from Florida, his health continued to decline over the next six weeks, until his death from myocarditis on May 24, 1929. He was buried in the Eddyville Cemetery in Eddyville.
