= United States Senate Committee on Privileges and Elections =

The Senate Committee on Privileges and Elections was a committee of the United States Senate.

== History ==
It was established by a Senate resolution on March 10, 1871, and terminated January 2, 1947, when its functions were transferred to the Committee on Rules and Administration. Among the matters referred to the committee were contested elections for Senate seats, questions regarding credentials of senators, financing of senatorial elections, and expenses of contestants in contested election cases. The committee also considered most legislation proposing the direct election of senators and some legislation concerning voting rights issues such as poll taxes and woman suffrage. The Legislative Reorganization Act of 1946 abolished the Committee on Privileges and Elections and transferred its jurisdiction to the Committee on Rules and Administration, which had a subcommittee on privileges and elections until 1977.

== Chairmen ==
- 1871–1872: Charles Sumner (R-MA)
- 1872–1877: Oliver P. Morton (R-IN)
- 1877–1879: Bainbridge Wadleigh (R-NH)
- 1879–1881: Eli Saulsbury (D-DE)
- 1881–1891: George Hoar (R-MA)
- 1891–1894: Zebulon Vance (D-NC)
- 1894–1895: George Gray (D-DE)
- 1895–1897: John H. Mitchell (R-OR)
- 1897: George F. Hoar (R-MA)
- 1898–1901: William E. Chandler (R-NH)
- 1901–1911: Julius Burrows (R-MI)
- 1911–1913: William P. Dillingham (R-VT)
- 1913–1917: John W. Kern (D-IN)
- 1917–1919: Atlee Pomerene (D-OH)
- 1919–1923: William P. Dillingham (R-VT)
- 1923–1925: Selden P. Spencer (R-MO)
- 1925–1927: Richard P. Ernst (R-KY)
- 1927–1933: Samuel Shortridge (R-CA)
- 1933–1941: Walter F. George (D-GA)
- 1941–1947: Theodore Francis Green (D-RI)

== See also ==
- List of United States Senate committees
