= 1927 Kentucky gubernatorial election =

- November 8, 1927
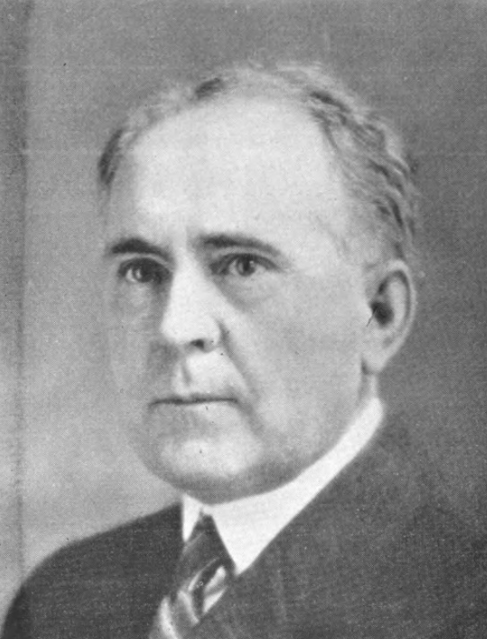

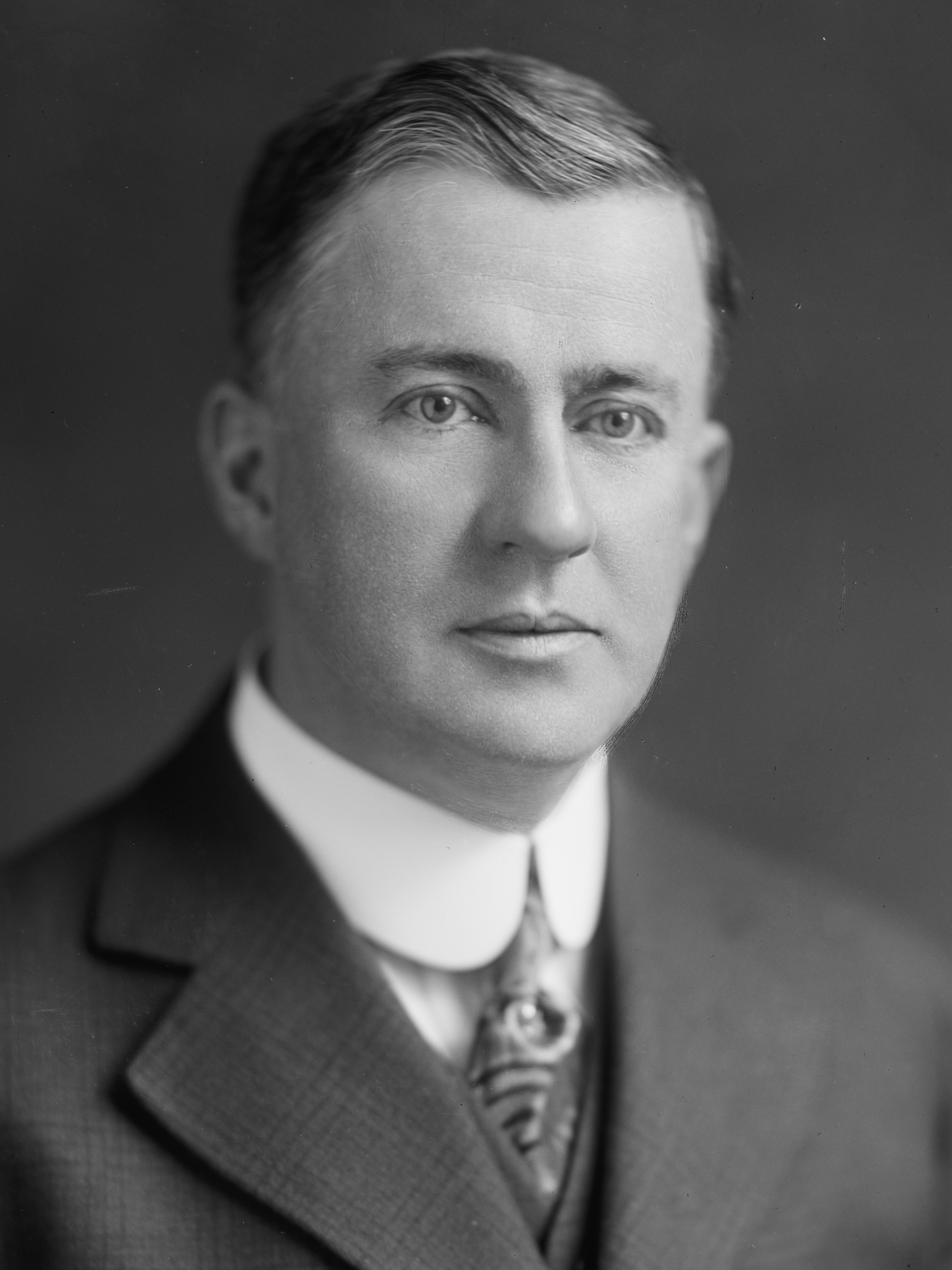
Nominee	Flem D. Sampson	J. C. W. Beckham
Party	Republican	Democratic
Popular vote	399,698	367,567
Percentage	52.09%	47.91%
- Sampson: 50–60% 60–70% 70–80% 80–90% >90% Beckham: 50–60% 60–70% 70–80% 80–90%
Governor before election
William J. Fields
Democratic
Elected Governor
Flem D. Sampson
Republican

The 1927 Kentucky gubernatorial election was held on November 8, 1927. Republican nominee Flem D. Sampson defeated the Democratic nominee, former governor and former U.S. Senator J. C. W. Beckham, with 52.09% of the vote.

== Primary elections ==
Primary elections were held on August 6, 1927.

=== Democratic primary ===
==== Candidates ====
- J. C. W. Beckham, former United States Senator and governor
- Robert T. Crowe, former Speaker of the Kentucky House of Representatives

==== Results ====
Primary results by county Beckham: 50%—60%; 60%—70%; 70%—80%; 80%—90%; 90%—100%; Crowe: 50%—60%; 60%—70%; 70%—80%; 80%—90%

Democratic primary results
Party	Candidate	Votes	%
Democratic	J. C. W. Beckham	161,681	53.95
Democratic	Robert T. Crowe	137,992	46.05
Total votes		299,673	100.00

=== Republican primary ===
==== Candidates ====
- Flem D. Sampson, former Chief Justice of the Kentucky Court of Appeals
- Robert H. Lucas, Kentucky Internal Revenue Collector

==== Results ====
Primary results by county Sampson: 50%—60%; 60%—70%; 70%—80%; 80%—90%; 90%—100%; Lucas: 50%—60%; 60%—70%; 70%—80%; 80%—90%; 90%—100%; Tie: 50%

Republican primary results
Party	Candidate	Votes	%
Republican	Flem D. Sampson	123,302	59.50
Republican	Robert H. Lucas	83,927	40.50
Total votes		207,229	100.00

== General election ==
=== Candidates ===
- Flem D. Sampson, Republican
- J. C. W. Beckham, Democratic

=== Results ===
1927 Kentucky gubernatorial election
Party	Candidate	Votes	%	±%
Republican	Flem D. Sampson	399,698	52.09	+6.28
Democratic	J. C. W. Beckham	367,567	47.91	−5.35
Total votes		767,265	100.0	N/A
Republican gain from Democratic				
