= Johnson N. Camden Jr. =

American politician

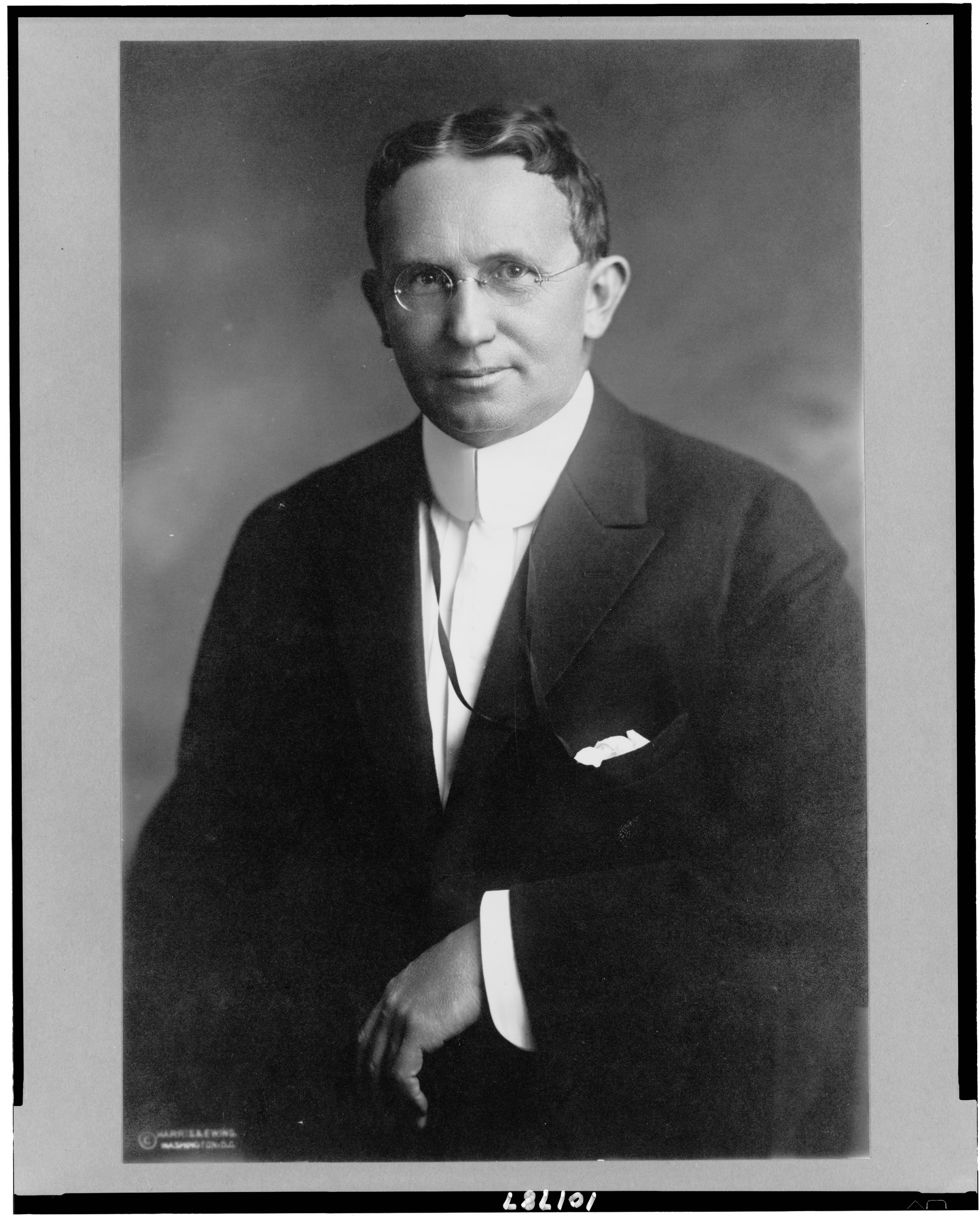
- Camden in 1906

United States Senator from Kentucky
- In office June 16, 1914 – March 4, 1915
- Preceded by: William O. Bradley
- Succeeded by: John C. W. Beckham

Personal details
- Born: Johnson Newlon Camden Jr. January 5, 1865 Parkersburg, West Virginia, U.S.
- Died: August 16, 1942 (aged 77) Paris, Kentucky, U.S.
- Resting place: Frankfort Cemetery
- Party: Democratic
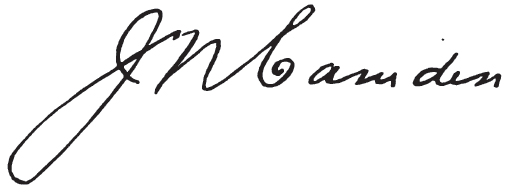
- Signature

Johnson Newlon Camden Jr. (January 5, 1865 – August 16, 1942) was a United States senator from Kentucky. His father, Johnson N. Camden, had been a United States senator from West Virginia.

Born in Parkersburg, West Virginia, Camden Jr. attended Episcopal High School in Alexandria, Virginia, Phillips Academy in Andover, Massachusetts, Virginia Military Institute in Lexington, Virginia, Columbia Law School in New York City, and the law school at University of Virginia in Charlottesville. Although admitted to the bar in 1888, he never practiced.

Camden moved to Spring Hill Farm, near Versailles, Kentucky, in 1890 and became involved in farming and Thoroughbred horse breeding and racing. He served for a time as president of the Kentucky Jockey Club. He was also interested in the opening and development of the coal fields in eastern Kentucky.

He was appointed as a Democrat to the U.S. Senate on June 16, 1914, to fill a vacancy caused by the death of William O. Bradley, whose term was about to expire. Camden did not run for the full term, but won a special election for the last four months of the current term on November 3, 1914, and served until March 3, 1915.

He went back to agricultural activities on a farm near Paris, Kentucky, until he died, aged 77. He was buried in Frankfort Cemetery in Frankfort.

In what is a mystery to many, Camden had the University Library at the then Morehead State Teachers College, now Morehead State University in Morehead, Kentucky, named for him in 1929. Camden had no ties to the school, nor had he ever visited.

== Sources ==
- United States Congress. "Johnson N. Camden Jr. (id: C000063)". Biographical Directory of the United States Congress.

Party political offices
First	Democratic nominee for U.S. Senator from Kentucky (Class 3); 1914	Succeeded by J. C. W. Beckham
U.S. Senate
Preceded by William O. Bradley	United States Senator (Class 3) from Kentucky; 1914–1915	Succeeded by J. C. W. Beckham
