= Lillard H. Carter =

American politician

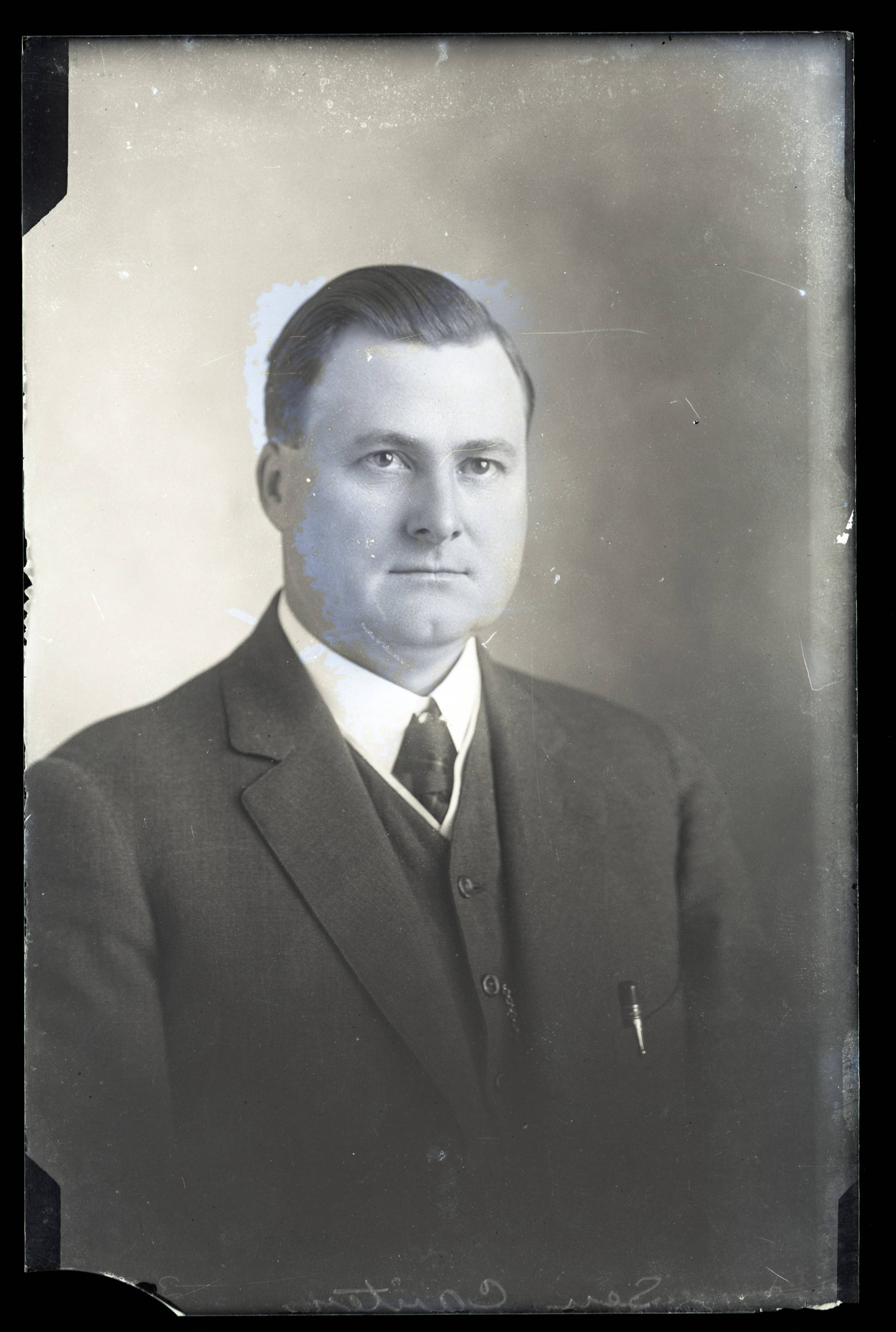

Acting Lieutenant Governor of Kentucky
- In office February 3, 1900 – January 1, 1902
- Governor: J. C. W. Beckham
- Preceded by: J. C. W. Beckham
- Succeeded by: Newton Willard Utley (acting)

President pro tempore of the Kentucky Senate
- In office February 2, 1900 – January 1, 1902
- Preceded by: William Goebel
- Succeeded by: Newton Willard Utley

Member of the Kentucky House of Representatives from the 57th district
- In office January 1, 1910 – January 1, 1912
- Preceded by: William E. Dowling
- Succeeded by: J. R. Paxton

Member of the Kentucky Senate from the 20th district
- In office January 1, 1898 – January 1, 1902
- Preceded by: W. W. Stephenson
- Succeeded by: Edmund H. Taylor Jr.

Personal details
- Born: August 11, 1867 Owen County, Kentucky, U.S.
- Died: June 21, 1923 (aged 55) Lawrenceburg, Kentucky, U.S.
- Party: Democratic

Lillard Harvey Carter (August 11, 1867 – June 21, 1923) was an American politician from Kentucky who was a member of the Kentucky Senate from 1898 to 1902 and the Kentucky House of Representatives from 1910 to 1912.

Following the resignation of William Goebel from the Senate to become governor of Kentucky, Carter was elected by the Senate in his place on February 2, 1900, to become President pro tempore. The following day, Goebel died and lieutenant governor J. C. W. Beckham ascended to the governorship, making Carter acting lieutenant governor.

He died on June 21, 1923, at age 55.
