= Richard P. Ernst =

American politician (1858–1934)

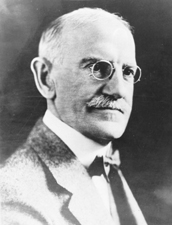

United States Senator from Kentucky
- In office March 4, 1921 – March 4, 1927
- Preceded by: John C.W. Beckham
- Succeeded by: Alben W. Barkley

Personal details
- Born: Richard Pretlow Ernst; February 28, 1858 Covington, Kentucky, U.S.
- Died: April 13, 1934 (aged 76) Baltimore, Maryland, U.S.
- Party: Republican

Richard Pretlow Ernst (February 28, 1858 – April 13, 1934) was a U.S. senator from Kentucky who served from 1921 to 1927. He was a Republican.

== Biography ==
Born in 1858, Ernst graduated from Centre College in 1878 and earned his law degree from the Cincinnati Law School in 1880. That year, he was admitted to the bar and began practicing law in Cincinnati, Ohio, and Covington, Kentucky. He served on the Covington city council from 1888 to 1892 and ran (unsuccessfully) for election to Congress in 1896.

After his election to the Senate in 1920, Ernst served on the Committee on the Revision of the Laws, the Committee on Patents, and the Committee on Privileges and Elections. He was defeated in his bid for re-election in 1926 by future Vice President Alben W. Barkley and returned to practicing law in Cincinnati.

He died in 1934 while in Baltimore, Maryland.

YMCA Camp Ernst, a YMCA summer camp in Burlington, Kentucky, is named after Senator Ernst, who provided the camp with its first 100 acres (0.4 km^{2}) of land.

Party political offices
Preceded by Augustus E. Willson	Republican nominee for United States Senator from Kentucky (Class 3); 1920, 1926	Succeeded by Maurice Thatcher
U.S. Senate
Preceded by J. C. W. Beckham	United States Senator (Class 3) from Kentucky; March 4, 1921–March 3, 1927	Succeeded by Alben W. Barkley
