= Thomas D. Clark =

American historian

Thomas Dionysius Clark (July 14, 1903 – June 28, 2005) was an American historian. Clark saved from destruction a large portion of Kentucky's printed history, which later became a core body of documents in the Kentucky Department for Libraries and Archives. Often referred to as the "Dean of Historians" Clark is best known for his 1937 work, A History of Kentucky. Clark was named Historian Laureate of the Commonwealth of Kentucky in 1990.

== Early years ==
Born in Louisville, Mississippi, to a cotton farmer and a schoolteacher, Thomas Clark received his primary education in a neighborhood school to the third grade. After that he made it only to the seventh grade at his mother's school. He dropped out of school to work at a sawmill and as many southern boys did in those days, helped out on the family farm. At sixteen, he took a job on a dredge boat that scoured the bed of the Pearl River. His mother urged him to get back in school.

In an interview, Clark recalled:

I left the boat in September 1920. Without a job. Without a future, really. I accidentally met a boy who told me about an agricultural high school Choctaw County Agricultural High School. I went down and within 10 minutes of getting off the train I'd registered. The old superintendent didn't ask me one thing about my education. He didn't know if I could read or write. Said you look like a big stout boy. You look like you'd make a good football player. So I was admitted as a football player. I went to that school for four years [and obtained] reasonably basic preparation.

=== University of Mississippi ===
Clark had decided that farming, manual labor and river work were not going to meet his needs. At the urging of his parents, he entered the University of Mississippi in September 1925. While there, he met his first mentor, historian Charles S. Sydnor, who held a Ph.D. from Johns Hopkins University. Even though Clark had but one class under Sydnor, British history, which wasn't even within his interests, the two had "deep conversations" about the rich heritage of the old South. Sydnor encouraged Clark to follow his interests into post graduate studies in the field of History.

It was at Ole Miss that Clark discovered the significance of his birthday and understood for the first time what Bastille Day was about. Clark "fell in love with learning" at that time, improved his use of the English language and began to develop writing and study habits that framed the disciplines through which he was to accomplish great things later in his life.

Clark had financed his education at Ole Miss with a cotton crop on land his father had given him but before he graduated the funds had all but run out. He then found a golf course that needed tending and took the job. It turned out that budding writer, William Faulkner, also having a hard time with finances, helped Clark tend the golf course. Clark was later quite surprised to see that Faulkner had "hit the bigtime" with his writing. He graduated with honors earning a BA in 1928.

=== University of Kentucky ===
Clark, through his new-found interest in history, began attending meetings of the American Historical Association (AHA). It was there that Clark claims to have been exposed to the profession of the historian through two major personalities he saw at the AHA meeting in Indianapolis, Indiana (December 1928):

- Ulrich Phillips - with Slavery: The Central Theme of Southern History
- James Breasted - with The New Crusade,

Upon hearing the presentations Clark recalls, " I came home thoroughly convinced I wanted to be a historian."

Receiving scholarships to both the University of Cincinnati and to the University of Kentucky, he chose the latter. Clark went on to receive his master's degree in history but when he would go further, the financial dilemma struck again. At the last minute, he was offered a fellowship at Duke.

=== Duke University ===
Hamilton: You took a doctorate at Duke. I understand your initial train ride to Durham was an eventful one?

Clark: Yes, a historic moment. I took the old southern train from Meridian, Mississippi. Rode it up to Atlanta and Spartanburg and up to Gastonia. And there was a tremendous mob of people around the station [at Gastonia]. The train was stopped. We sat, as I recall, almost an hour. That was the strike. That was the beginning of the breaking of the old feudal system of textile labor relations. That was an historic moment in the South. And I was there. Right in the middle of it without knowing what it was all about.

That December the AHA met in Durham and I went. Duke used its graduate students as guides and so forth. I took E. Merton Coulter of Georgia, John Oliver of Pittsburg, and Professor Lynch of Indiana out to see the new campus rising out of the ground and they became lifelong friends of mine. I heard James Harvey Robinson deliver his presidential address ["The Newer Ways of Historians," American Historical Association 35 (January 1930)]. I came up close to the Association . . . [for] the second time, which had an impact on me.

— From David Hamilton's Conversation with Historian Thomas D. Clark:

At Duke, Clark centered his research on the American frontier, the development of Midwestern railroads, and slavery issues of the South. While there, he met Martha Elizabeth Turner who was to become his wife of 62 years and mother of his two children. He completed his doctorate in history in 1931. From there, it was back to the University of Kentucky, where he was to teach history by day and develop library resources by night.

=== Professorship at UK ===
Clark became a professor at the University of Kentucky in 1931. With few resources at his disposal, he almost single-handedly built Kentucky's history department into a major doctoral program in southern history. At one point its faculty included Albert D. Kirwan, Clement Eaton, James F. Hopkins, Holman Hamilton, Steven A. Channing, and Charles P. Roland. Clark began a 70-year-long enterprise at cataloging, organizing, rescuing, and preserving Kentucky's history. He established at UK a culture of respect for the heritage and documentation of the past. He re-organized the History department, bringing innovations to the way the subject was researched and taught. His comprehensive methods were inclusive and exhaustive in scope and detail yet presented to his students in a logical and eloquent manner.

Upon receiving news that irreplaceable historical documents were being abused and defaced in Frankfort, Dr Clark rushed to the scene from Lexington. There he found that pages of military records of Kentuckians involved in the Battle of 1812, the Mexican war and the Civil War were being used as temporary sleeping cots and pipe lighters. He appealed to the newly elected Gov. A.B. "Happy" Chandler to have the documents moved to the Lexington campus. If not for this intervention, vast portions of Kentucky's History would have been missing from the Archives that are preserved to this day. Clark's subsequent appeals to the Legislature and the Governors led to the eventual establishment of the Kentucky Archives Commission in 1957.

Dr Thomas Clark became head of the history department in 1941 and a distinguished professor in 1950. His good-natured, down-to-earth style and gentle charm made him a favorite among students and fellow faculty which made it possible for him to recruit the vast amount of help needed to build and maintain the growing Kentucky archives. He labored to lead the effort toward completion and retained the workforce even after his retirement as department head in 1965 and his final retirement as professor in 1968.

Clark served on the Kentucky State Archives and Records Commission from 1958 until his death. He wrote on matters of timber and natural resource conservation, fiscal responsibility, constitutional and education reform, and human rights. He was praised by Rep. Steve Nunn in the Kentucky Long-Term Policy Research Center's release of 14 November 2001, for his vision and for "always seeking to advance the common good." He taught at various universities including Harvard, Duke, and Stanford, as well as lecturing at the Salzburg Seminar in American Studies in Austria. He was also invited to lecture on behalf of the State Department at Oxford University, and in Greece, India and Yugoslavia.

Clark fought to preserve cultural heritage for the benefit of future generations and to promote public awareness and appreciation of the same in his own day:

A community without a sense of History, is not a community at all.

=== Professional Life, Post-Retirement ===
Clark remained an active member of the American Historical Association and spoke on countless occasions in many venues both academic and non-academic. In 1968, Clark was named Sesquicentennial Professor of History at Indiana University in 1968, and Distinguished Service Professor, 1968–1973.

Working with Indiana University Chancellor Herman B Wells, Clark was instrumental in moving the business office of the Organization of American Historians to the Indiana University campus in Bloomington from Salt Lake City in 1970.

He was a proponent of the Kentucky Education Reform Act of 1991. He lived to see the dedication and opening of the Kentucky History Center in Frankfort in April 1999. The center was renamed after Clark in 2005 as the Thomas D. Clark Center for Kentucky History. Clark died on June 28, 2005, at the age of 101.

== Timeline ==
- 1903 - Born in Mississippi on July 14, 1903
- 1919 - 1920 worked a 'dead end' job on a dredge boat
- 1920 - 1924 attended Choctaw County Agricultural High School
- 1925 - 1928 University of Mississippi
- 1928 - 1929 Graduate work at University of Kentucky
- 1929 - 1931 Fellowship at Duke before it was Duke University
- 1931 - 2001 70-year tenure at the University of Kentucky
- 1933 - first book published - The Beginning of the L&N (railroad) - married Martha Turner
- 1935 - rescues precious historical documents from destruction at Frankfort
- 1937 - published most famous work, A History of Kentucky
- 1957 - becomes first chair of the new Kentucky Archives Commission
- 1982 - pushes through Department for Libraries and Archives
- 1986 - helps establish Friends of Kentucky Public Archives, Inc.
- 1990 - Kentucky General Assembly names Clark - Kentucky's Historian Laureate for life
- 1992 - The Kentucky Encyclopedia published in which Clark was a "driving force"
- 1994 - Mississippi Historical Society's - B.L.C. Wailes Award
- 1999 - Kentucky History Center dedicated in April - Frankfort, Kentucky
- 2001 - Vic Hellard Jr. Award - November 14 - Kentucky Long-Term Policy Research Center
- 2005 - on June 28 Dr. Clark dies at the age of 101.

== Bibliography ==
=== Authored ===
- Beginning of the L&N, From New Orleans to Cairo, the Illinois Central (1933)
- A Pioneer Southern Railroad from New Orleans to Cairo, (University of North Carolina Press, Chapel Hill, North Carolina, 1936)
- A History of Kentucky (Prentice Hall, New York, 1937)
- The Rampaging Frontier: Manners and Humors of Pioneer Days in the South and Middle West (Bobbs-Merrill, Indianapolis, Indiana, 1939)
- The Kentucky (Rivers of America Series) (Farrar & Rinehart, New York, 1942)
- Simon Kenton, Kentucky Scout (Farrar & Rinehart, New York, 1943)
- Pills, Petticoats, and Plows: The Southern Country Store (Bobbs-Merrill, Indianapolis, Indiana, 1944)
- Southern Country Editor (Bobbs-Merrill, Indianapolis, Indiana, 1948)
- The Rural Press and the New South (Baton Rouge, 1948)
- The Emerging South (with A. D. Kirwan) (Oxford University Press, New York, 1961)
- The South Since Appomattox (Oxford University Press, New York 1967)
- Kentucky, Land of Contrast (Harper & Row, New York, 1968)
- Three American Frontiers. Writings of Thomas D. Clark, (University of Kentucky Press, Lexington, 1968)
- Pleasant Hill and Its Shakers, (Shakertown Press, Pleasant Hill, Kentucky, 1968)
- Agrarian Kentucky
- Exploring Kentucky
- History of Indiana University (4 volumes) (Indiana University Press, Bloomington, IN, 1970)
- Pleasant Hill in the Civil War (Pleasant Hill Press, 1972)
- South Carolina, The Grand Tour, 1780-1865 (University of South Carolina Press, Columbia, S.C., 1973)
- A Century of Banking History in the Bluegrass: The Second National Bank and Trust Company (John Bradford Press Lexington, Kentucky, 1983)
- Frontiers in Conflict: The Old West, 1795-1830 (University of New Mexico Press, Albuquerque, 1989)
- Footloose in Jacksonian America: Robert W. Scott and His Agrarian World, (The Kentucky Historical Society, Frankfort, Kentucky, 1989)
- Clark County, Kentucky, A History, (Winchester Clark County Heritage Commission, 1995)
- The People's House: Governor's Mansions of Kentucky, (with Margaret A Lane) (University of Kentucky Press, Lexington, 2002)

=== Edited ===
- Bluegrass Cavalcade (University of Kentucky Press, Lexington, 1956)
- Travels in the Old South (University of Oklahoma Press, Norman, Okla., 1956)
- Travels in the New South (University of Oklahoma Press, Norman, Okla., 1962)
- Gold Rush Diary: The Diary of E. Douglas Perkins (University of Kentucky Press, Lexington, 1967)
- Off at Sunrise, The Diary of Charles Glass Gray (Huntington Library, San Marino California, 1976)
- The Voice of the Frontier - John Bradford's Notes on Kentucky, (University of Kentucky Press, Lexington, 1993)

Kentucky Department for Libraries and Archives has a list of Dr. Clark's works at: https://web.archive.org/web/20100409002437/http://www.kdla.ky.gov/resources/KYHistorianLaureate.htm

== See also ==
- History of Kentucky
- Historiography
