= Lowell H. Harrison =

American historian (1922–2011)

- Born: Lowell Hayes Harrison; October 23, 1922; Russell Springs, Kentucky, U.S.
- Died: October 12, 2011 (aged 88); Owensboro, Kentucky, U.S.
- Military service
- Branch: United States Army
- Unit: 104th Infantry Division
- Wars: World War II

Dr. Lowell Hayes Harrison (October 23, 1922 – October 12, 2011) was an American historian specializing in the U.S. state of Kentucky.

== Biography ==
Harrison graduated from College High (Bowling Green, Kentucky). He was a veteran of World War II. He received a B.A. from Western Kentucky University in 1946, then enrolled at New York University where he earned an M.A. in 1947 and a PhD in 1951, both in history. He then attended the London School of Economics on a Fulbright Scholarship.

His first regular teaching position was at West Texas State College as an associate professor. By 1957, he was head of their history department. Eventually, Harrison became chair of the College of Social Sciences at West Texas. In 1967, Harrison returned to Western Kentucky University as professor of history and graduate advisor. In 1979 he was named university historian. He retired from teaching in 1988. He died on October 12, 2011.

== Works ==
Harrison wrote more than 126 works, including 15 books.

=== Books ===
- The Civil War in Kentucky (1975)
- Western Kentucky University (1987)
- Kentucky's Road to Statehood (1992)
- A New History of Kentucky (1997)
- Lincoln of Kentucky (2000)

=== Selected articles ===
- "The Civil War in Kentucky: Some Persistent Questions," The Register of the Kentucky Historical Society. Kentucky Historical Society, Vol. 76, 1978
