= James C. Klotter =

American historian

James C. Klotter is an American historian who has served as the State Historian of Kentucky since 1980. Klotter is also a history professor at Georgetown College and one of the co-authors of Kentucky's staple history book, A New History of Kentucky.

Klotter received a Ph.D. in History from the University of Kentucky, and he has been awarded honorary degrees from Eastern Kentucky University and Union College. Klotter was the executive director of the Kentucky Historical Society for many years, and he was an associate editor of the Kentucky Encyclopedia. In 2015, the Boyd County High School chapter of the Rho Kappa National Social Studies Honor Society was named in his honor. In 2022, he was inducted into the Kentucky Writers Hall of Fame for 2022 by the Carnegie Center for Literacy and Learning.

As of 2017, Klotter lives in Lexington, Kentucky.

== Major works ==
- Kentucky: Decades of Discord, 1865-1900. (1977).
- William Goebel: The Politics of Wrath. Lexington, Kentucky. (1977).
- Genealogies of Kentucky Families, from the Register of the Kentucky Historical Society. Volume O – Y. (1981)
- The Breckinridges of Kentucky, 1760-1981. (1986)
- History Mysteries: The Cases of James Harrod, Tecumseh, “Honest Dick” Tate, and William Goebel (1989).
- Kentucky: Portrait in Paradox, 1900-1950. (1996)
- Kentucky Justice, Southern Humor, and American Manhood: Understanding the Life and Death of Richard Reid. (1997)
- A New History of Kentucky. University Press of Kentucky. Lexington, Kentucky. (1997)
- Faces of Kentucky with Freda Klotter. (2008)
- A Concise History of Kentucky with Freda Klotter. (2008)
- Appalachian Ghost Stories: Tales from Bloody Breathitt. Klotter wrote the foreword. (2012)
- In Defense of Clio (2016)
- Henry Clay: The Man Who Would Be President (2018)
