= List of elections in 1931 =

The following elections occurred in the year 1931.

== Africa ==
- 1931 Egyptian parliamentary election
- 1931 Liberian general election

== Asia ==
- 1931 Afghan parliamentary election
- 1931 Ceylonese State Council election
- 1931 Dutch East Indies Volksraad election
- 1931 Egyptian parliamentary election
- 1931 Philippine House of Representatives elections
- 1931 Philippine Senate elections
- 1931 Soviet Union legislative election
- 1931 Turkish general election
- 1931 Turkish presidential election

== Europe ==
- 1931 Bulgarian parliamentary election
- 1931 Finnish presidential election
- 1931 Hungarian parliamentary election
- 1931 Icelandic parliamentary election
- 1931 Latvian parliamentary election
- 1931 Luxembourg general election
- 1931 Norwegian local elections
- 1931 Romanian general election
- 1931 Soviet Union legislative election
- 1931 Spanish general election
- 1931 Spanish local elections
- 1931 Swiss federal election
- 1931 Swiss referendums
- 1931 Turkish general election
- 1931 Turkish presidential election
- 1931 Yugoslavian parliamentary election
- Antanas Smetona re-elected

=== United Kingdom ===
- 1931 United Kingdom general election
  - England: 1931 United Kingdom general election in England
  - Scotland: 1931 United Kingdom general election in Scotland
  - Wales: 1931 United Kingdom general election in Wales
  - Northern Ireland: 1931 United Kingdom general election in Northern Ireland
  - List of MPs elected in the 1931 United Kingdom general election
- 1931 Ashton-under-Lyne by-election
- 1931 Bristol East by-election
- 1931 Fermanagh and Tyrone by-election
- 1931 Gateshead by-election
- 1931 Glasgow St Rollox by-election
- 1931 Guildford by-election
- 1931 Islington East by-election
- 1931 Liverpool Wavertree by-election
- 1931 Manchester Ardwick by-election
- 1931 Ogmore by-election
- 1931 Pontypridd by-election
- 1931 Rutherglen by-election
- 1931 Salisbury by-election
- 1931 Scarborough and Whitby by-election
- 1931 Stroud by-election
- 1931 Sunderland by-election
- 1931 Westminster St George's by-election

==== United Kingdom local ====
===== English local =====
- 1931 Bermondsey Borough election
- 1931 Southwark Borough election

== North America ==
=== Canada ===
- 1931 Edmonton municipal election
- 1931 Ottawa municipal election
- 1931 Prince Edward Island general election
- 1931 Quebec general election
- 1931 Toronto municipal election
- 1931 Yukon general election

=== United States ===
==== United States lieutenant gubernatorial ====
- 1931 Mississippi lieutenant gubernatorial election

==== United States gubernatorial ====
- 1931 Kentucky gubernatorial election
- 1931 Mississippi gubernatorial election
- 1931 New Jersey gubernatorial election
- 1931 United States gubernatorial elections

==== United States House of Representatives ====
- 1931 United States House of Representatives elections

==== United States Senate ====
- 1931 United States Senate elections
- 1931 United States Senate special election in Vermont

==== United States mayoral elections ====
- 1931 Baltimore mayoral election
- 1931 Chicago mayoral election
- 1931 Manchester, New Hampshire, mayoral election
- 1931 Philadelphia mayoral election
- 1931 San Diego mayoral election
- 1931 San Francisco mayoral election

== South America ==
- 1931 Argentine general election
- 1931 Bolivian general election
- 1931 Bolivian constitutional referendum
- 1931 Chilean presidential election
- 1931 Colombian parliamentary election
- 1931 Ecuadorian presidential election
- 1931 Guatemalan general election
- 1931 Peruvian general election
- 1931 Salvadoran presidential election
- 1931 Salvadoran legislative election
- 1931 Uruguayan parliamentary election

== Oceania ==
- 1931 New Zealand general election

=== Australia ===
- 1931 Annandale state by-election
- 1931 Australian federal election
- 1931 Clarence state by-election
- 1931 East Sydney by-election
- 1931 Parkes by-election
- 1931 Tasmanian state election
- 1931 Upper Hunter state by-election

== See also ==
- Category:1931 elections
