= 1931 United States gubernatorial elections =

- November 3, 1931; April 19, 1932 (LA)

4 governorships
| | Majority party | Minority party |
|---|---|---|
| Party | Democratic | Republican |
| Seats before | 25 | 21 |
| Seats after | 27 | 19 |
| Seat change | ▲2 | ▼2 |
| Seats up | 2 | 2 |
| Seats won | 4 | 0 |
- Democratic gain Democratic hold

United States gubernatorial elections were held in 1931, in four states. Kentucky, Louisiana and Mississippi hold their gubernatorial elections in odd numbered years, every 4 years, preceding the United States presidential election year. New Jersey at this time held gubernatorial elections every 3 years. It would abandon this practice in 1949.

== Race summary ==
=== Results ===
| State | Incumbent | Party | First elected | Result | Candidates |
|---|---|---|---|---|---|
| Kentucky | Flem D. Sampson | Republican | 1927 | Incumbent term-limited. New governor elected. Democratic gain. | ✓ Ruby Laffoon (Democratic) 54.28%; William B. Harrison (Republican) 45.43%; John J. Thobe (Socialist) 0.14%; Herman Horning (Socialist Labor) 0.14% |
| Louisiana (Held, 19 April 1932) | Alvin Olin King | Democratic | 1932 (Note: King took office after his predecessor (Huey Long) resigned.) | Incumbent retired. New governor elected. Democratic hold. | ✓ Oscar K. Allen (Democratic) 99.95%; Scattering 0.05% |
| Mississippi | Theodore G. Bilbo | Democratic | 1915; 1919 (term-limited); 1927 | Incumbent term-limited. New governor elected. Democratic hold. | ✓ Martin S. Conner (Democratic); Unopposed |
| New Jersey | Morgan Foster Larson | Republican | 1928 | Incumbent term-limited. New governor elected. Democratic gain. | ✓ A. Harry Moore (Democratic) 57.82%; David Baird Jr. (Republican) 39.74%; Edmund R. Halsey (Independent) 1.06%; Owen M. Bruner (National Prohibition) 0.64%; Herman F. Niessner (Socialist) 0.41%; John J. Ballam (Communist) 0.14%; John C. Butterworth (Socialist Labor) 0.12%; John A. Kelly (Taxpayers) 0.08% |
