= Joseph D. Scholtz =

American politician (1890–1972)

Joseph Denunzio Scholtz
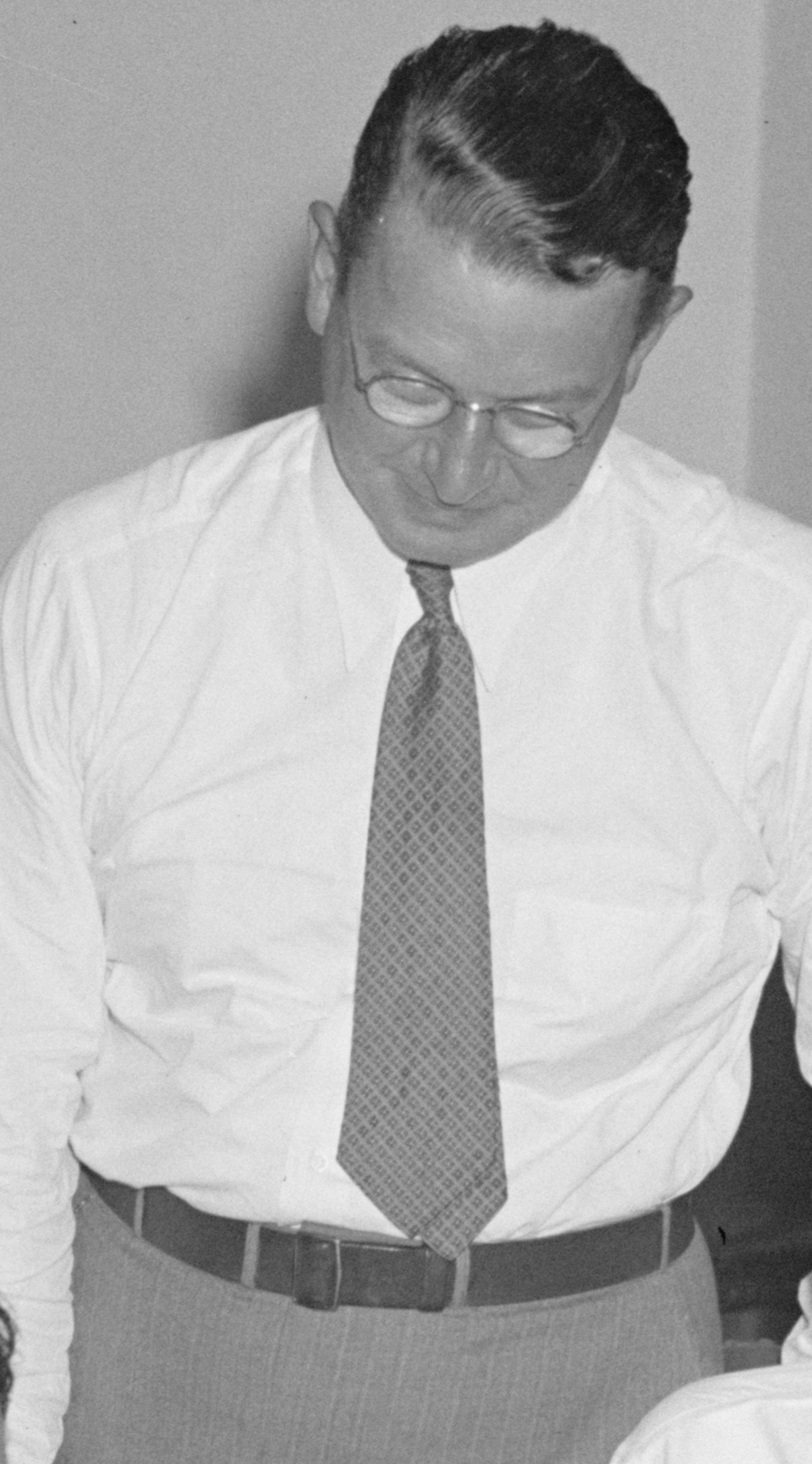
- Scholtz in July 1939

43rd Mayor of Louisville
- In office 1937–1941
- Preceded by: Neville Miller
- Succeeded by: Wilson W. Wyatt

Personal details
- Born: January 16, 1890 Louisville, Kentucky, U.S.
- Died: September 25, 1972 (aged 82) Louisville, Kentucky, U.S.
- Resting place: Cave Hill Cemetery; Louisville, Kentucky, U.S.
- Party: Democratic
- Education: Cornell University
- Occupation: Fruit and produce wholesaler; politician
- Military career
- Allegiance: United States
- Branch: United States Army
- Rank: Major
- Conflicts: World War I World War II
- Awards: Legion of Merit

Joseph Denunzio Scholtz (January 16, 1890 – September 25, 1972) was Mayor of Louisville, Kentucky, from 1937 to 1941.

== Life ==
Joseph D. Scholtz graduated from DuPont Manual High School, then Cornell University in 1912. After college he worked in his family's fruit and produce company, the Joseph Denunzio Fruit Company, eventually becoming vice president. He served in World War I and was stationed at Camp Taylor in Louisville.

Scholtz was appointed president of Louisville's Board of Parks in 1933 and was the only Democrat to serve in Republican Mayor William B. Harrison's administration. He became president of the Louisville Water Company in 1935.

He was elected mayor in 1937. During his term a business license tax was enacted and the planning of Standiford Field began, as did the switchover from streetcars to buses in the city. he convinced the Board of Education to increase pay for black teachers in the city's school system.

He left office a week before the Bombing of Pearl Harbor. After directing civil defense in a nine-state area in 1942, he joined the army as a major in 1943 and was sent to North Africa then Italy, where he was a commissioner for the military government. For his services he received the Legion of Merit, the highest non-combat medal awarded.

After the war he served as postmaster of Louisville from 1947 to 1960. He died in 1972 and was buried in Cave Hill Cemetery.
