= 1936 United States Senate election in Mississippi =

1936 U.S. Senate Democratic primary in Mississippi
- August 25, 1936
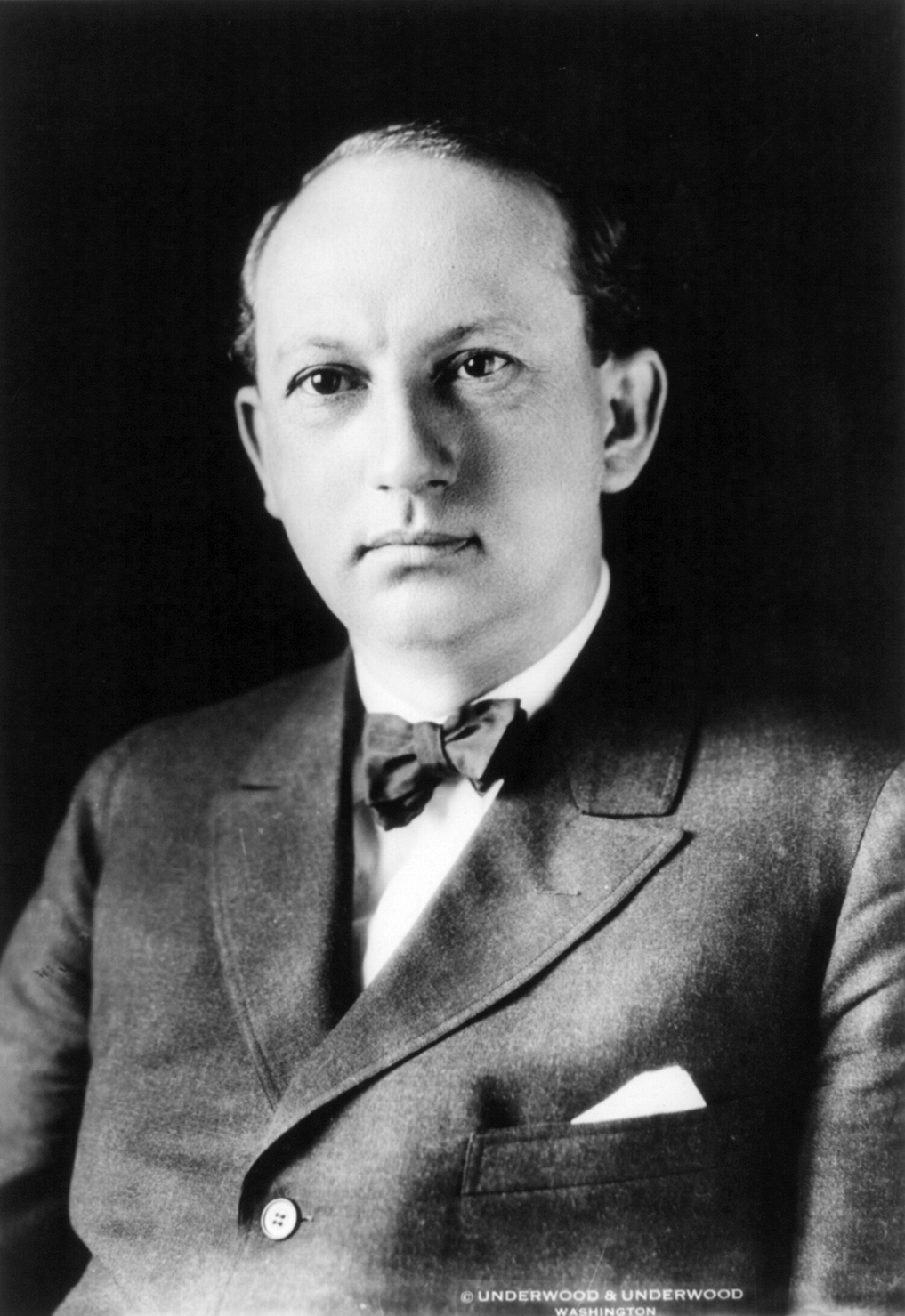

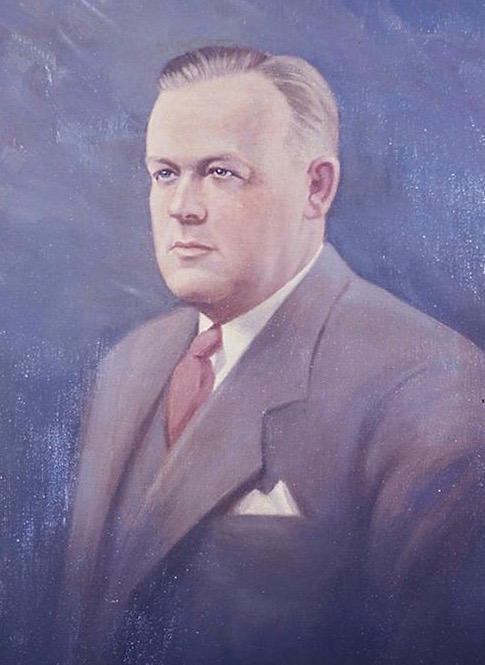
Nominee	Pat Harrison	Martin S. Conner
Party	Democratic	Democratic
Popular vote	128,729	65,296
Percentage	65.51%	33.23%
- County results Harrison: 40–50% 50–60% 60–70% 70–80% 80–90% Conner: 40–50% 50–60% 60–70%
U.S. senator before election
Pat Harrison
Democratic
Elected U.S. Senator
Pat Harrison
Democratic

The 1936 United States Senate election in Mississippi was held on November 3, 1936. Incumbent Democratic U.S. Senator Pat Harrison was re-elected to a fourth term in office.

Because Harrison faced no opposition in the general election, his victory in the August 25 primary was tantamount to election.

== Democratic primary ==
Incumbent Senator Pat Harrison received a primary challenge from Martin S. Conner, the Governor of Mississippi. Conner's campaign was supported by Theodore G. Bilbo, the other U.S. Senator from Mississippi. Stuart C. Broom, a former ally and law partner of Bilbo, supported Harrison's reelection.

Time reported that support from Broom, who was nicknamed "Clean Sweep", was important to the Harrison campaign, with Broom routinely making a speech "which brought down the house wherever he delivered it.

=== Candidates ===
- Martin S. Conner, Governor of Mississippi
- Frank S. Harper
- Pat Harrison, incumbent Senator since 1919

=== Results ===
1936 Democratic U.S. Senate primary
Party	Candidate	Votes	%
Democratic	Pat Harrison (incumbent)	128,729	65.51%
Democratic	Martin S. Conner	65,296	33.23%
Democratic	Frank H. Harper	2,472	1.26%
Total votes		196,497	100.00%

== General election ==
=== Results ===
1936 U.S. Senate election in Mississippi
Party	Candidate	Votes	%	±%
Democratic	Pat Harrison	140,570	100.00%	Steady
Democratic	Martin S. Conner	1	0.00%	N/A
Democratic	Frank H. Harper	1	0.00%	N/A
Total votes		140,572	100.00%	

== See also ==
- 1936 United States Senate elections
