= Neville Miller (politician) =

American politician (1894–1977)

42nd Mayor of Louisville
- In office 1933–1937
- Preceded by: William B. Harrison
- Succeeded by: Joseph D. Scholtz

Personal details
- Born: February 17, 1894 Louisville, Kentucky, U.S.
- Died: March 27, 1977 (aged 83) Washington D.C., U.S.
- Resting place: Cave Hill Cemetery; Louisville, Kentucky, U.S.
- Party: Democratic
- Education: Princeton University; Harvard Law School
- Occupation: Attorney; law professor; politician

Neville Miller (February 17, 1894 – March 27, 1977) was mayor of Louisville, Kentucky, from 1933 to 1937.

== Life ==
His father, Shackelford Miller, was Chief Justice of the Kentucky Court of Appeals (the highest state appellate court at the time). He was valedictorian of his 1912 class at Louisville Male High School, and earned a bachelor's degree from Princeton University in 1916 and a law degree from Harvard Law School in 1920.

Miller practiced law in Louisville with his father and brother, Shackelford Miller, Jr., in the firm Miller and Miller, and was elected president of the Kentucky Bar Association in 1924. However, he primarily taught law during this time, and became the first dean of the University of Louisville School of Law in 1930. After being active in the party for years, he was narrowly elected mayor as a Democrat in 1933, ending 15 years of Republican dominance of the office.

He led the city during the worst years of the Great Depression and helped reorganize city finances for the changing times. Miller is best known as the "flood mayor" for his leadership during the Ohio River flood of 1937, the worst in the city's history. He directed evacuations and relief efforts and made nationwide appeals for donations and volunteers over the radio.

Due to his use of the radio during the flood crisis, Miller briefly attained some national celebrity and, after a brief stint at Princeton, served as president of the National Association of Broadcasters from 1938 to 1944, spearheading the radio industry's support of the war effort. He practiced communications law in Washington, D.C., from 1945 until his retirement in 1974.

He also served as director of the Louisville Water Company and on the boards of the Louisville Free Public Library, the Park Board and the Civil Service Board.

He was buried in Cave Hill Cemetery.
