= James F. Clay =

American politician

James Franklin Clay
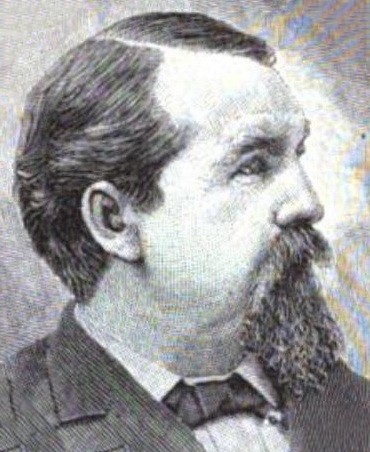

Member of the U.S. House of Representatives from Kentucky's 2nd district
- In office March 4, 1883 – March 3, 1885
- Succeeded by: Polk Laffoon

Member of the Kentucky Senate from the 5th district
- In office August 7, 1871 – August 2, 1875
- Preceded by: I. A. Spalding
- Succeeded by: J. H. Stanley

Personal details
- Born: October 29, 1840 Henderson, Kentucky
- Died: August 17, 1921 (aged 80) Henderson, Kentucky
- Party: Democratic
- Profession: Lawyer

James Franklin Clay (October 29, 1840 – August 17, 1921) was a U.S. representative from Kentucky.

Born in Henderson, Kentucky, Clay attended public and private schools at Henderson. He graduated from Georgetown College, Kentucky, in June 1860. He studied law and was admitted to the bar in 1862, commencing practice in Henderson.

He served as member of the Kentucky Senate from 1871 to 1875.

Clay was elected as a Democrat to the 48th Congress and served March 4, 1883 – March 3, 1885.

He was an unsuccessful candidate for renomination in 1884 and resumed law practice in Henderson.

He served as city attorney and as attorney for the St. Louis & Southern Railroad and the Ohio Valley Railway Co.

He died in Henderson, Kentucky, on August 17, 1921, and was interred in Fernwood Cemetery.

U.S. House of Representatives
Preceded by James A. McKenzie	Member of the U.S. House of Representatives from Kentucky's 2nd congressional district March 4, 1883 – March 3, 1885	Succeeded by Polk Laffoon
