= William T. Ellis =

American politician

William Thomas Ellis
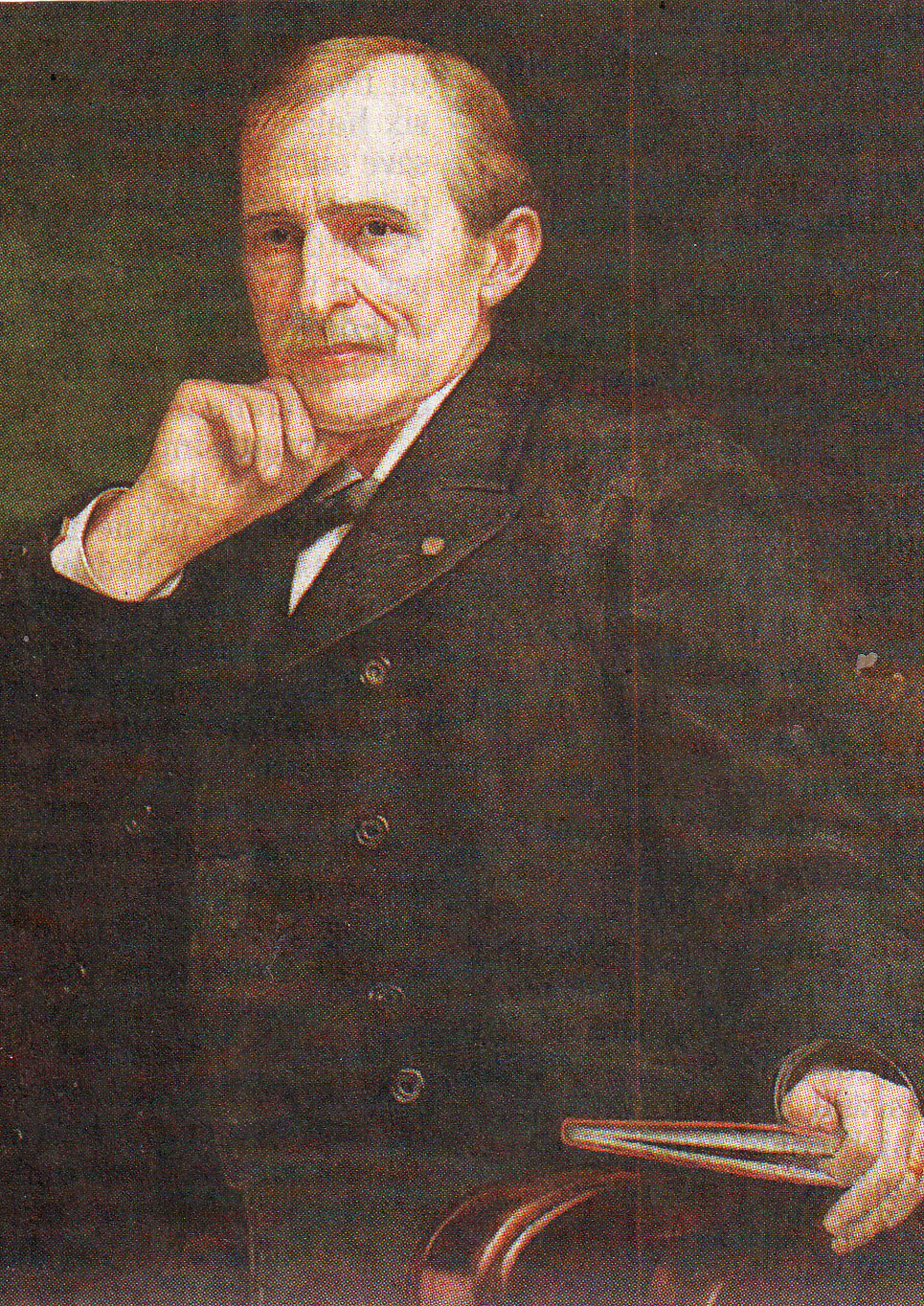
- Portrait of Ellis by Aurelius O. Revenaugh

Member of the U.S. House of Representatives from Kentucky's 2nd district
- In office March 4, 1889 – March 3, 1895
- Preceded by: Polk Laffoon
- Succeeded by: John Daniel Clardy

Personal details
- Born: July 24, 1845 Daviess County, Kentucky
- Died: January 8, 1925 (aged 79) Owensboro, Kentucky
- Resting place: Elmwood Cemetery
- Party: Democratic
- Spouse(s): Alice Coffey; Mattie B. Miller
- Education: Harvard Law School
- Profession: Lawyer

Military service
- Allegiance: Confederate States of America
- Branch/service: (Confederate States of America) Confederate States Army
- Years of service: 1861 – 1865
- Unit: 1st Kentucky Cavalry
- Battles/wars: American Civil War

William Thomas Ellis (July 24, 1845 – January 8, 1925) was a U.S. representative from Kentucky, United States.

== Early life and family ==
William Ellis was born near Knottsville, Kentucky, on July 24, 1845. He was one of two sons born Luther R. and Mary M. (Kellum) Ellis.

Ellis was educated in the common schools until age sixteen. On October 5, 1861, he enlisted as a private in the 1st Kentucky Cavalry. This unit became a part of the Orphan Brigade. Ellis eventually rose to become a non-commissioned officer in command of scouts. He served until the end of the war and mustered out on April 21, 1865.

After the war, Ellis resumed his studies at Pleasant Valley Cemetery in Daviess County. To defray the cost of his education, he worked during the summer months. He studied law, supporting himself by serving as principal of Mount Etna Academy in Ohio County in 1867 and 1868. Admitted to the bar in 1868, he attended a course of lectures at Harvard Law School before commencing practice in Owensboro in 1870.

On October 20, 1871, Ellis married Alice Coffey. Coffey died in 1872, and on November 2, 1876, Ellis married Mattie B. Miller.

== Political career ==
In August 1870, Ellis was elected county attorney for Daviess County. He was re-elected to this position in 1874. He served as a Democratic presidential elector for the ticket of Samuel J. Tilden and Thomas Andrews Hendricks in the 1876 presidential election. He unsuccessfully sought election to the Fiftieth Congress in 1886.

Ellis was elected to represent Kentucky's Second District in the U.S. House of Representatives in 1888. He was twice re-elected, serving in the Fifty-first, Fifty-second, and Fifty-third Congresses (March 4, 1889 – March 3, 1895). While he was away from his law practice on congressional business, the firm's business was handled by his law partners, one of whom was future Congressman William N. Sweeney.

During the Fifty-second and Fifty-third Congresses, he chaired the Committee on Revision of the Laws. A Free Silver supporter, he served on the Banking and Currency Committee and was critical of President Grover Cleveland's sound money position. He did not seek re-election in 1894.

== Later life and death ==
After his service in Congress, Ellis returned to his law practice. He was a delegate to the 1896 Democratic National Convention. He also engaged in literary pursuits.

Ellis died in Owensboro, Kentucky, on January 8, 1925, and was interred in Rosehill Elmwood Cemetery.

U.S. House of Representatives
Preceded by Polk Laffoon	Member of the U.S. House of Representatives from Kentucky's 2nd congressional district March 4, 1889 – March 3, 1895	Succeeded by John D. Clardy
