= Henry D. Allen =

American politician (1854–1924)

Henry Dixon Allen
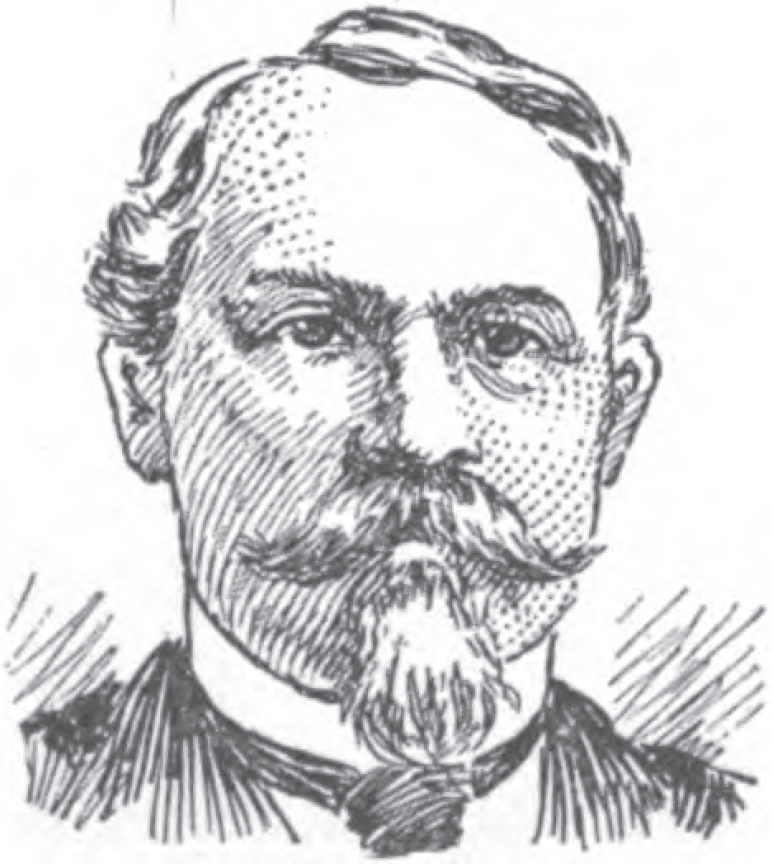

Member of the U.S. House of Representatives from Kentucky's 2nd district
- In office March 4, 1899 – March 3, 1903
- Preceded by: John Daniel Clardy
- Succeeded by: Augustus Owsley Stanley

Personal details
- Born: June 24, 1854 Henderson County, Kentucky
- Died: March 9, 1924 (aged 69) Morganfield, Kentucky
- Resting place: Masonic Cemetery
- Party: Democratic
- Education: Missouri Medical College
- Profession: Lawyer

Henry Dixon Allen (June 24, 1854 – March 9, 1924) was a U.S. representative from Kentucky.

Born near Henderson, Kentucky, Allen moved with his parents to Morganfield, Union County, in 1855. He attended the common schools and Morganfield Collegiate Institute. He taught school in Union County 1869–1875. He studied medicine and graduated from Missouri Medical College in 1877. Practiced medicine in Union County from 1877 to 1878. Abandoned medicine and studied law. He was admitted to the bar in 1878 and commenced practice in Morganfield, Kentucky. County school commissioner 1879–1881. He served as prosecuting attorney of Union County 1882–1891.

Allen was elected as a Democrat to the Fifty-sixth and Fifty-seventh Congresses (March 4, 1899 – March 3, 1903). He was not a candidate for renomination in 1902. He resumed the practice of law. He also engaged in banking and agricultural pursuits. He died in Morganfield, Kentucky, March 9, 1924. He was interred in Masonic Cemetery.

U.S. House of Representatives
Preceded by John D. Clardy	Member of the U.S. House of Representatives from Kentucky's 2nd congressional district March 4, 1899 – March 3, 1903	Succeeded by Augustus O. Stanley
