= John D. Clardy =

American politician

John Daniel Clardy
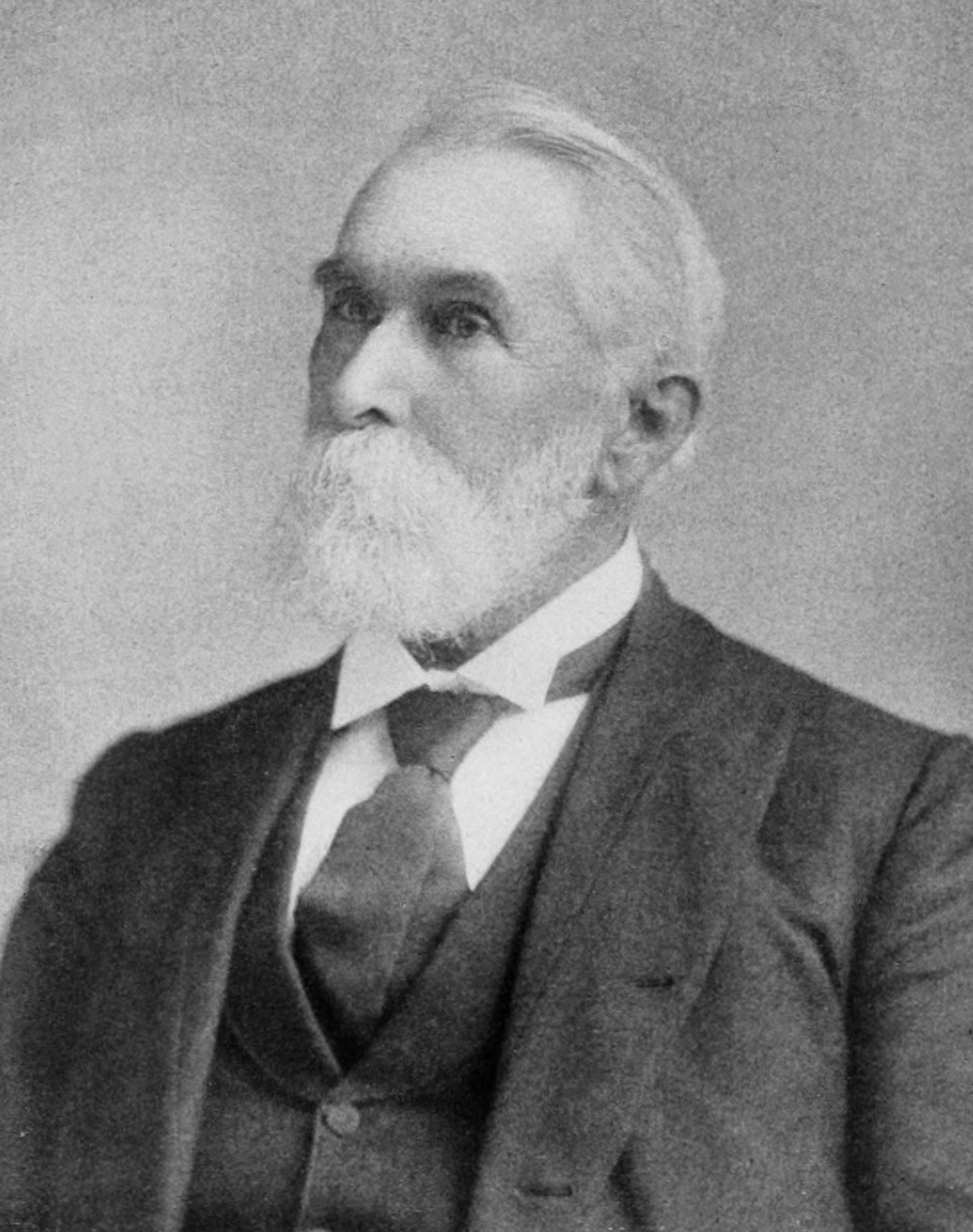

Member of the U.S. House of Representatives from Kentucky's 2nd district
- In office March 4, 1895 – March 3, 1899
- Preceded by: William Thomas Ellis
- Succeeded by: Henry Dixon Allen

Personal details
- Born: August 30, 1828 Smith County, Tennessee
- Died: August 20, 1918 (aged 89) Christian County, Kentucky
- Resting place: Clardy's County Cemetery
- Party: Democratic
- Spouse: Ann F. Bacon
- Education: Perelman School of Medicine at the University of Pennsylvania
- Profession: Physician and farmer

John Daniel Clardy (August 30, 1828 – August 20, 1918) was a U.S. representative from Kentucky.

== Early life ==
John Clardy was born in Smith County, Tennessee, on August 30, 1828. He was one of six sons and two daughters born to John C. and Elizabeth (Cayce) Clardy. Three of Clardy's brothers served in the Confederate States Army during the Civil War; two of them were killed in action.

The Clardy family moved to Christian County, Kentucky, in 1831. He attained his early education in the county schools. He matriculated to Georgetown College in Georgetown, Kentucky, graduating in 1848. After teaching school for one year, he began studying medicine under Dr. Nicholas Thomas of Tennessee. He enrolled at the University of Louisville for one year before finishing his medical degree at the University of Pennsylvania School of Medicine in 1851.

After graduation, Clardy returned to Kentucky and commenced practice in Long View, Kentucky. After three years, he relocated to Blandville, Kentucky, where he remained until the beginning of the Civil War. During the war, he spent most of his time in New York City as a member of the firm of Bacon, Clardy, and Company. He returned to Christian County in 1866, practicing medicine irregularly and engaging in agricultural pursuits. He purchased several tracts of land in Christian County and built his estate named "Oakland" into a five hundred fifty acre farm.

Clardy married Ann F. Bacon in 1854. The couple had three children – John F. Clardy, Fleming Cayce Clardy, and Fannie C. (Clardy) Prestridge. Clardy served as a deacon in the Baptist church in which he was raised.

== Political career ==
Clardy was chosen as a delegate to the state constitutional convention in 1890. He was a candidate for the Democratic gubernatorial nomination in 1891, but lost the nomination to John Y. Brown in part because his campaigning was hampered by his duties in the constitutional convention. He was appointed as one of the State commissioners to the Columbian Exposition at Chicago in 1893.

In 1894, Clardy defeated Judge Samuel Vance and William McClain for the Democratic nomination to represent the Second District in the U.S. House of Representatives. He defeated the Republican nominee, Elijah G. Sebree, by a majority of three thousand votes. He was re-elected once, serving in the Fifty-fourth and Fifty-fifth Congresses (March 4, 1895 – March 3, 1899). He advocated for the free coinage of silver as long as it could be kept on parity with gold. He was not a candidate for renomination in 1898.

== Later life and death ==
After his service in Congress, Clardy retired from public life. He died at his home near Hopkinsville, Kentucky, on August 20, 1918, and was interred in Clardy's County Cemetery in Bells, Kentucky.

U.S. House of Representatives
Preceded by William T. Ellis	Member of the U.S. House of Representatives from Kentucky's 2nd congressional district March 4, 1895 – March 3, 1899	Succeeded by Henry D. Allen
