= 1931 Mississippi lieutenant gubernatorial election =

1931 Mississippi Democratic lieutenant gubernatorial primary
- August 4, 1931
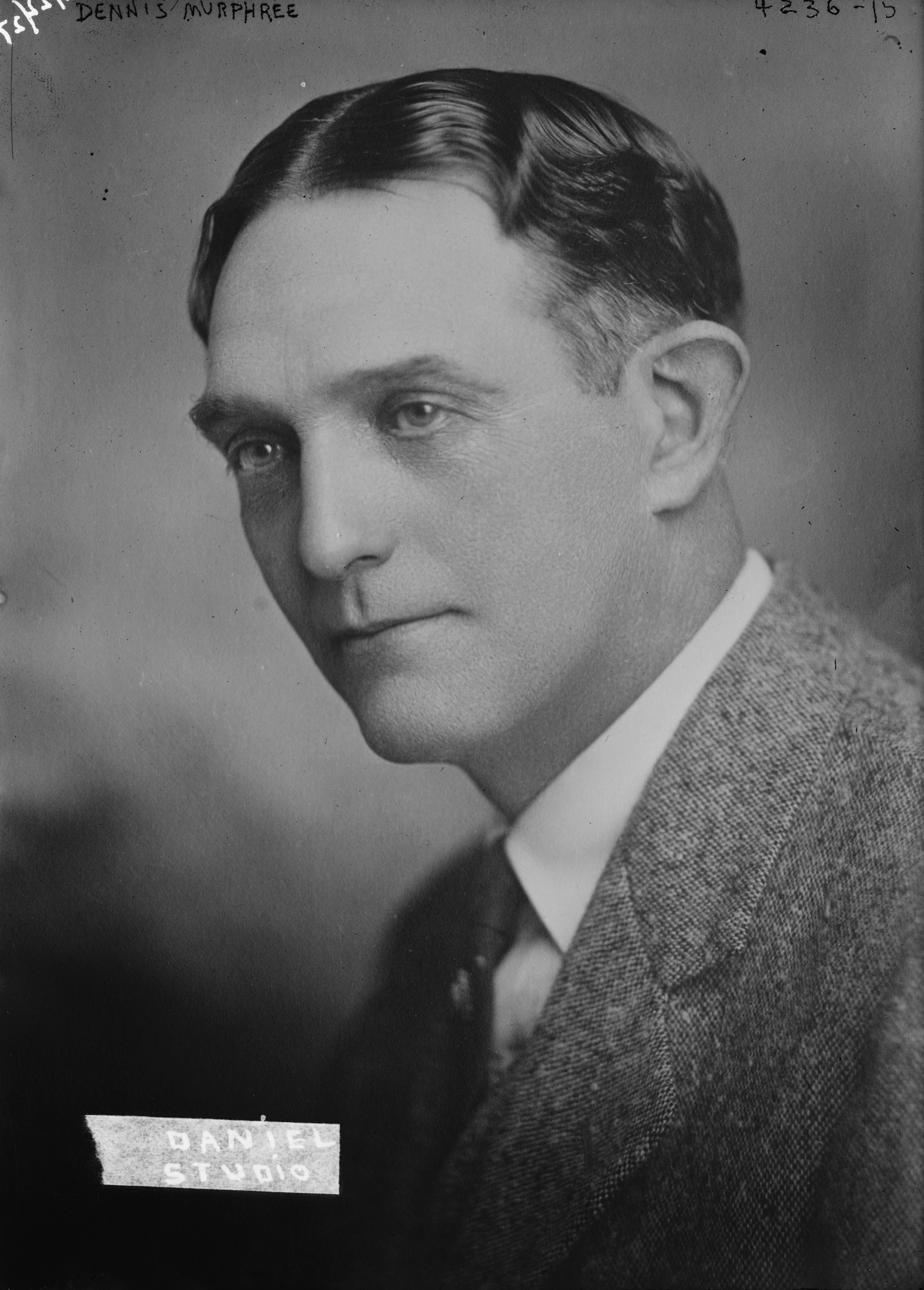

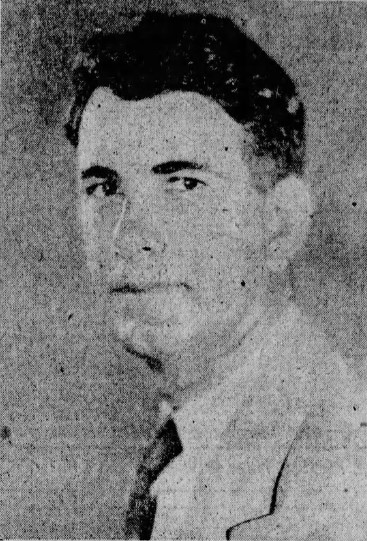
Candidate	Dennis Murphree	Bidwell Adam
Party	Democratic	Democratic
Popular vote	173,339	129,614
Percentage	57.22%	42.78%
- County results Murphree: 50–60% 60–70% 70–80% Adam: 50–60% 60–70% 70–80%
Lieutenant governor before election
Bidwell Adam
Democratic
Elected Lieutenant governor
Dennis Murphree
Democratic

The 1931 Mississippi lieutenant gubernatorial election took place on November 3, 1931, in order to elect the Lieutenant Governor of Mississippi. Incumbent Democrat Bidwell Adam ran for reelection to a second term, but was defeated in the primary by Dennis Murphree.

As was common at the time, the Democratic candidate ran unopposed in the general election; therefore, the Democratic primary was the real contest, and winning the primary was considered tantamount to election.

== Democratic primary ==
=== Results ===
August 4, 1931 Democratic primary
Party	Candidate	Votes	%
Democratic	Dennis Murphree	173,339	57.22%
Democratic	Bidwell Adam (incumbent)	129,614	42.78%
Total votes		302,953	100.00%

== General election ==
In the general election, Murphree won unopposed.

=== Results ===
November 3, 1931 General Election
Party	Candidate	Votes	%
Democratic	Dennis Murphree	44,095	100.00%
Total votes		44,095	100.00%
