= 1931 Colombian parliamentary election =

Congressional elections were held in Colombia on 10 May 1931 to elect the Chamber of Representatives. The Liberal Party received the most votes.

The election was characterized by fraud and violence by police forces loyal to either party.

== Results ==
=== Chamber of Representatives ===
| Party | Votes | % | Seats |
|---|---|---|---|
| Colombian Liberal Party | 401,993 | 51.07 | 59 |
| Colombian Conservative Party | 384,948 | 48.90 | 59 |
| Other parties | 216 | 0.03 | 0 |
| Total | 787,157 | 100.00 | 118 |
Source: Nohlen, Abente et al.

=== Senate ===
| Party | Seats |
|---|---|
| Colombian Conservative Party | 29 |
| Colombian Liberal Party | 27 |
| Total | 56 |
Source: Abente et al.
