= 1931 Soviet Union legislative election =

- February 1931

All 1,576 seats in the All-Union Congress of Soviets
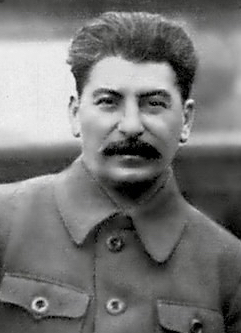

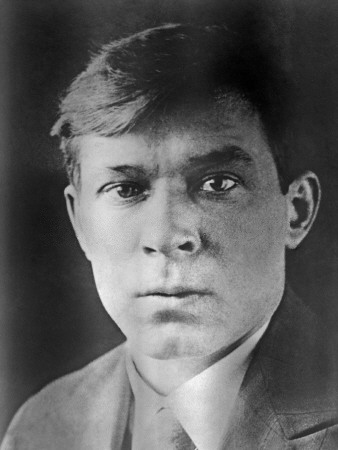
	First party	Second party	Third party
Leader	Joseph Stalin		Aleksandr Kosarev
Party	VKP(b)	Independents	Komsomol
Seats won	1,151	390	35
Seat change	▼11	▼67	▲32
Chairman of the Council of People's Commissars before election
Vyacheslav Molotov
VKP(b)
Elected Chairman of the Council of People's Commissars
Vyacheslav Molotov
VKP(b)

Elections to the Sixth All-Union Congress of Soviets were held in February 1931, at which 1,576 deputies were elected or delegated.

== Results ==
Party	Seats	+/–
All-Union Communist Party (Bolsheviks)	1,151	–11
Komsomol	35	+3
Independents	390	–67
Total	1,576	–80
