= Ruby Laffoon =

Governor of Kentucky from 1931 to 1935

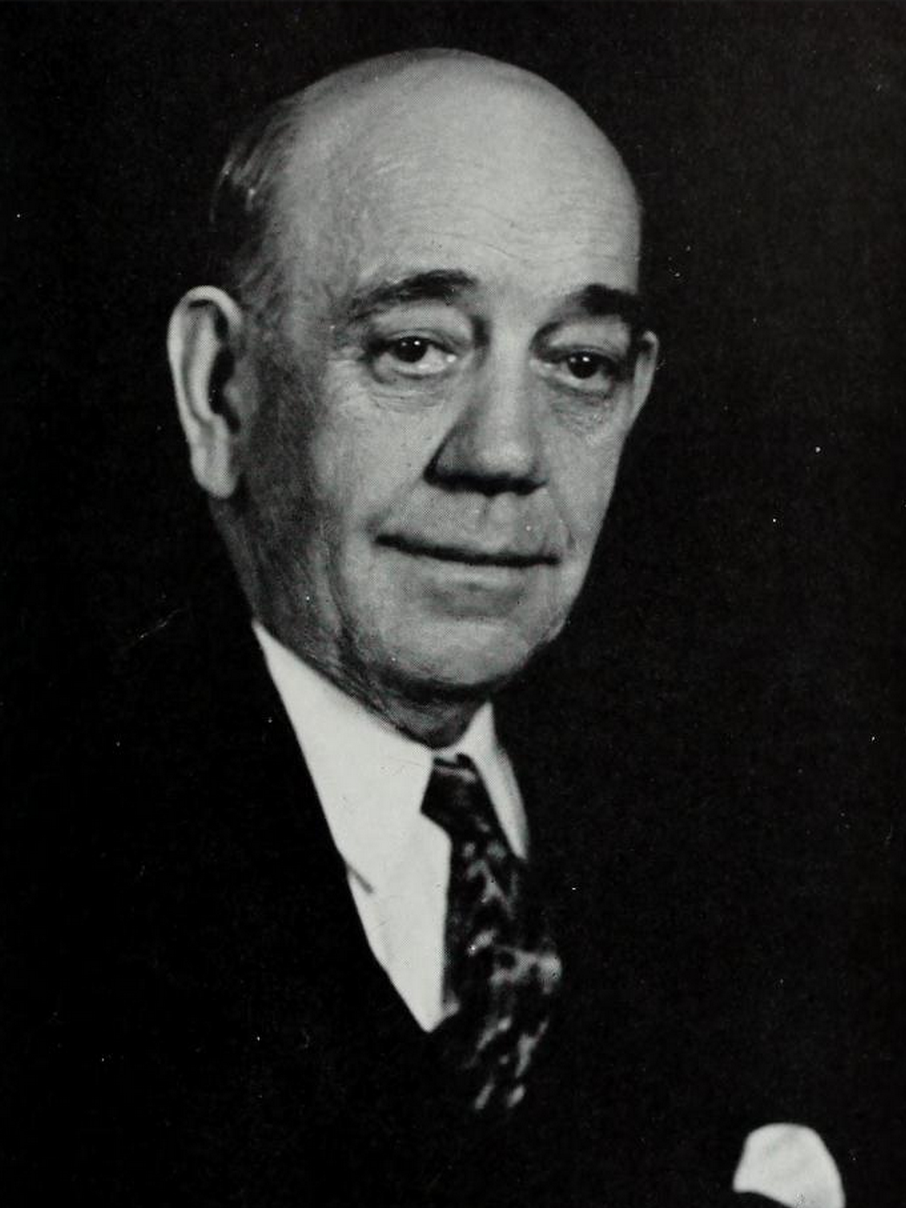

43rd Governor of Kentucky
- In office December 8, 1931 – December 10, 1935
- Lieutenant: A. B. "Happy" Chandler
- Preceded by: Flem D. Sampson
- Succeeded by: A. B. "Happy" Chandler

Personal details
- Born: January 15, 1869 Madisonville, Kentucky, U.S.
- Died: March 1, 1941 (aged 72) Madisonville, Kentucky, U.S.
- Party: Democratic
- Spouse: Mary Bryant Nisbet (m. 1894)
- Relations: Polk Laffoon (uncle)
- Education: Washington and Lee University School of Law
- Profession: Lawyer

Ruby Laffoon (January 15, 1869 – March 1, 1941) was an American attorney and politician who served as the 43rd governor of Kentucky from 1931 to 1935. A Kentucky native, at age 17, Laffoon moved to Washington, D.C., to live with his uncle, U.S. Representative Polk Laffoon. He developed an interest in politics and returned to Kentucky, where he compiled a mixed record of victories and defeats in elections at the county and state levels. In 1931, he was chosen as the Democratic gubernatorial nominee by a nominating convention, not a primary, making him the only Kentucky gubernatorial candidate to be chosen by a convention after 1903. In the general election, he defeated Republican William B. Harrison by what was then the largest margin of victory in Kentucky gubernatorial history.

Dubbed "the terrible Turk from Madisonville", Laffoon was confronted with the economic difficulties of the Great Depression. To raise additional revenue for the state treasury, he advocated the enactment of the state's first sales tax. This issue dominated most of his term in office and split the state Democratic Party and Laffoon's own administration. The lieutenant governor, A. B. "Happy" Chandler, led the fight against the tax in the legislature. After the tax was defeated in two regular legislative sessions and one specially called legislative session, Laffoon forged a bipartisan alliance to get the tax passed in a special session in 1934.

Laffoon's feud with Lieutenant Governor Chandler continued throughout his term and affected the 1935 gubernatorial race. (At the time, the lieutenant governor was elected independently from the governor.) Term-limited by the state constitution, Laffoon supported political boss Tom Rhea to succeed him as governor, and convinced the Democrats to again hold a nominating convention to choose their gubernatorial nominee. This would have greatly improved Laffoon's chances of hand-picking his successor. While Laffoon was on a visit to Washington, D.C., Chandler was left as acting governor under the provisions of the Kentucky Constitution. Chandler issued a call for a special legislative session to consider a mandatory primary election bill. Laffoon rushed back to the state to invalidate the call, but the Kentucky Court of Appeals upheld it as constitutional, and the primary law was passed. Chandler defeated Rhea in the primary, and went on to succeed Laffoon as governor. Following his term in office, Laffoon returned to his native Madisonville, where he died of a stroke in 1941.

Among his gubernatorial legacies was appointing a record number of Kentucky Colonels, including Harland Sanders, who would use the title "Colonel" when he opened his chain of Kentucky Fried Chicken restaurants.

== Early life ==
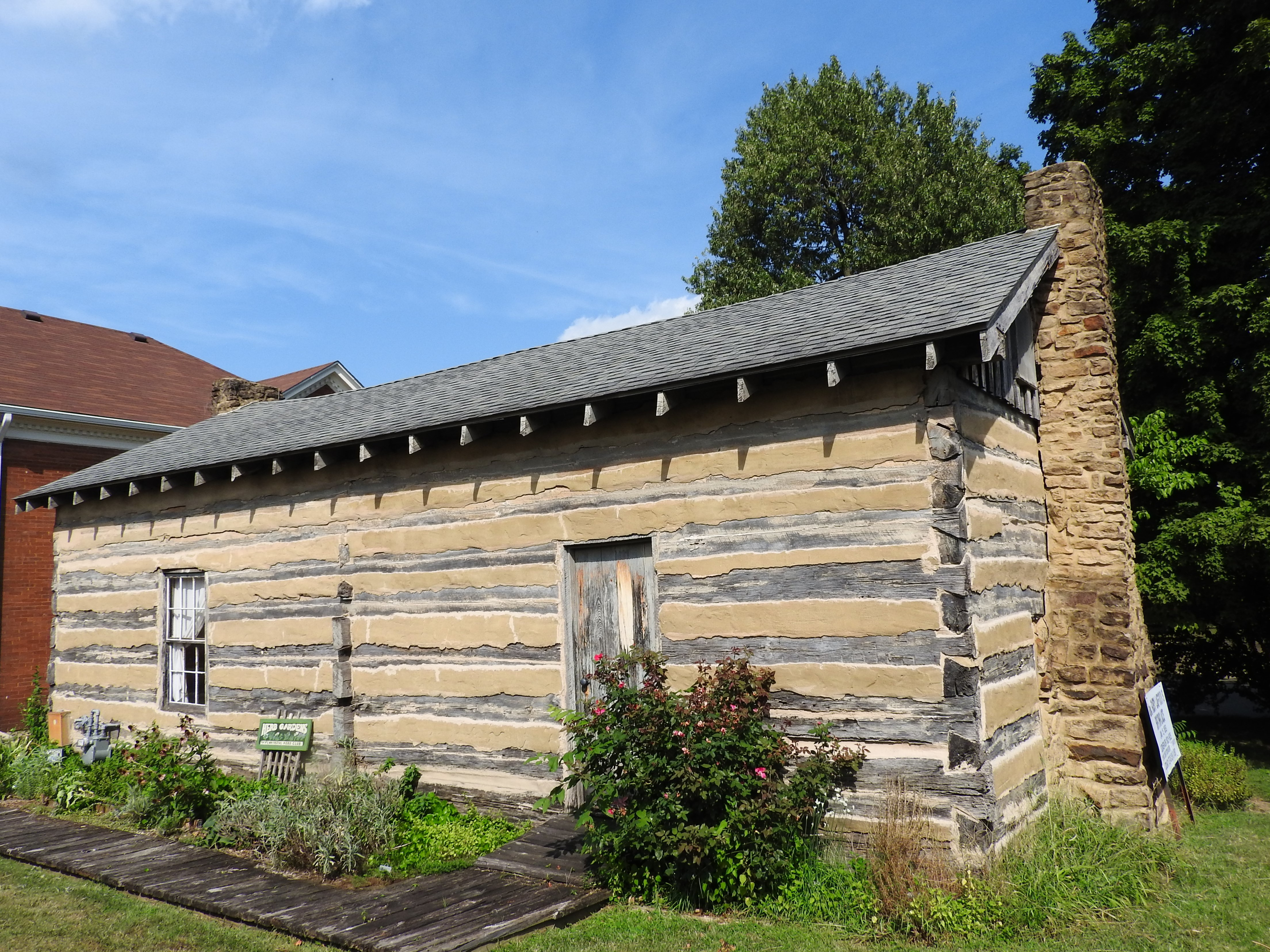
Born in this log cabin, now in downtown Madisonville

Ruby Laffoon was born on January 15, 1869, in a log cabin in Madisonville, Kentucky. He was the third child and only son of John Bledsoe Laffoon Jr. and Martha Henrietta (née Earle) Laffoon. According to Laffoon biographer Vernon Gipson, his parents could not decide on a name for their new child, and for several years, referred to him only as "Bud". When he was a young child, Laffoon chose the name "Ruby" after John Edwin Ruby, a local businessman whose grocery store he frequently visited.

The Laffoons were primarily farmers but also had some experience in politics. Ruby Laffoon's grandfather, John Bledsoe Laffoon Sr., migrated to Kentucky from South Carolina in 1815 and served one term in the Kentucky House of Representatives. Ruby's father, John Jr., served several terms as a deputy sheriff in Hopkins County and one term as county assessor. Ruby's uncle, Polk Laffoon, served two terms in the United States House of Representatives.

Laffoon's early education was obtained in the public schools of Madisonville. While there, one of his teachers was his sister, Susan Isabella Laffoon, who was only 16 years old. At age 15, while plowing a field, Laffoon was kicked in the hip by a mule, requiring a six-week stay in a Nashville hospital. In the winter of the same year, he slipped on some ice and re-injured the hip. As a result of these injuries, his right leg was one-and-a-half inches shorter than his left leg, requiring him to wear special shoes and walk with a cane and a limp for the rest of his life. After his injury, Laffoon's parents decided that he could not make his living as a farmer and sent him to the private school of W. C. O'Bryan. By age 17, he was teaching in the common schools of Charleston in Hopkins County.

== Legal and early political career ==
In 1886, Laffoon moved to Washington, D.C., to live with his uncle, U.S. Representative Polk Laffoon. There he served as a messenger in the office of Judge C. R. Faulkner, director of the pension office. In September 1887, he enrolled at Columbia Law School (asserted by Vernon Gipson to have been a prior designation for George Washington University Law School). On October 17, 1888, he matriculated to Washington and Lee University, where he earned a law degree in 1890. He returned to Madisonville, was admitted to the bar, and began practicing in the office of Judge William H. Yost. He became active in the Democratic Party and served as a county election officer. In 1892, he was elected city attorney of Madisonville over Ward Headley. In 1894, he ran for the office of county attorney for Hopkins County, but lost to Roy Salmon by seventeen votes.

Laffoon married Mary "May" Bryant Nisbet on January 31, 1894, at, the Lucille Hotel in Madisonville. The couple had three daughters. Besides supporting her husband's political endeavors, May Laffoon was also active in politics. She was a delegate-at-large to every Democratic National Convention between 1932 and 1960, and actively campaigned for Franklin D. Roosevelt during his first run for the presidency. To supplement the family's income, Ruby Laffoon became a partner in the Madisonville branch of the Phoenix Insurance Company in 1897. He sold his interest in the company in 1901, the same year he made a second bid to become county attorney. He won the election over Thomas E. Finley by a vote of 3,335 to 2,910. In 1905, he was re-elected to his post, marking the first time in the history of Hopkins County that the county attorney had been re-elected.

In 1907, Laffoon sought the office of state treasurer. He faced no opposition in the Democratic primary, but the entire Democratic ticket was defeated in the general election. In 1911, he ran for state auditor, but lost in the primary to Henry M. Bosworth. That same year, he was elected as one of Hopkins County's delegates to the state Democratic convention. A bill passed in the state legislature in 1912 created a State Insurance Rating Board under the office of state auditor, and Bosworth appointed Laffoon chairman of the board due to his experience in the insurance field and as a reward for his loyalty to the party. In 1915, Laffoon sought the post of Commonwealth's Attorney for the Fourth Judicial District, which comprised Hopkins, Caldwell, Crittenden, and Livingston counties. He lost in the primary to J. Elliott Baker, but the Republican candidate, Charles Ferguson, won the general election.

In September 1918, Laffoon moved to San Antonio, Texas, where he opened a law practice and managed a citrus fruit business near Galveston. Though he had intended this to be a permanent relocation, while on a visit to family a few months later, friends urged him to return to Kentucky, and he obliged after only three months in Texas. In 1921, he sought election to the bench of the Fourth District Circuit Court. In the primary, he defeated Trice Bennett, a candidate from Princeton, and went on to face Republican incumbent Carl Henderson of Marion. In the general election on November 8, 1921, Laffoon defeated Henderson, carrying every county in the district. In his first term, only 7 percent of his decisions were reversed by the Kentucky Court of Appeals, which was a record for the Fourth District at the time. He was re-elected for a second six-year term in 1927.

== Governor of Kentucky ==
In 1931, Laffoon sought the Democratic gubernatorial nomination. As a result of factional infighting within the Democratic party, the Democrats opted for a nominating convention instead of a primary to choose their nominee for governor. It was the first nominating convention held by the Democrats since the Music Hall Convention that nominated William Goebel in 1899, and it was the only one held after 1903. The convention was held in Lexington on May 12, 1931. Laffoon gained the support of several important leaders within the party, including Ben Johnson, Thomas Rhea, M. M. Logan, Allie Young, and William J. Fields. He was selected in a landslide over a myriad of candidates, including sitting lieutenant governor James Breathitt Jr. and Centre College football hero James "Red" Roberts.

Despite his physical disability, Laffoon waged a vigorous campaign across the state. During campaign stops, he interspersed political commentary with passages from the Bible. The Louisville Courier-Journal objected to his campaign style and gave a tentative endorsement to the Republican William B. Harrison, the mayor of Louisville. Dubbed "the terrible Turk from Madisonville" by former Republican governor Edwin P. Morrow, Laffoon promised that, if elected, he would remove all of the Republican officials appointed by sitting governor Flem D. Sampson from state government. He cited the failed administration of Governor Sampson and the problem-filled presidency of Herbert Hoover as reasons to elect a Democrat. In the general election, Laffoon defeated Harrison by a margin of just over 72,000 votes, the largest margin of victory for any Kentucky governor at the time.

Shortly after taking office, Laffoon organized the Honorable Order of Kentucky Colonels, a charitable organization of people who had been commissioned as honorary Kentucky colonels. During his term as governor, Laffoon commissioned 2,368 honorary colonels, the most ever by a Kentucky governor. His best known commission was to Harland Sanders, who used the title "Colonel" when he opened his chain of Kentucky Fried Chicken restaurants. Other colonels commissioned by Laffoon included Mae West, Shirley Temple, Clark Gable, Bing Crosby, Will Rogers, Fred Astaire, Jean Harlow, Mary Pickford, Charlie Chaplin, Jack Dempsey and W. C. Fields.

=== Fight for a sales tax ===
Laffoon's administration was confronted by the economic difficulties of the Great Depression. While he proposed a number of improvements, money was not available in the state budget to implement his plans. In his first full year in office, he cut $11.5 million from the state budget, but it remained out-of-balance. The state issued additional interest-bearing warrants to cover its debts. In 1931, these warrants accounted for 24.2 percent of the state's receipts; by 1932, that number had climbed to 40.2 percent. In order to raise more funds, Laffoon proposed a 2 percent state sales tax in 1932. The proposal was extremely unpopular with merchants and private citizens, and it showed little promise of passing in the General Assembly. On March 2, 1932, a mob of 100 anti-tax protesters stormed the governor's mansion, damaging some items inside. In an attempt to get the tax passed, Laffoon agreed to seek only a 1 percent tax. The proposal passed the House, but a Senate committee refused to report it to the full chamber for a vote.

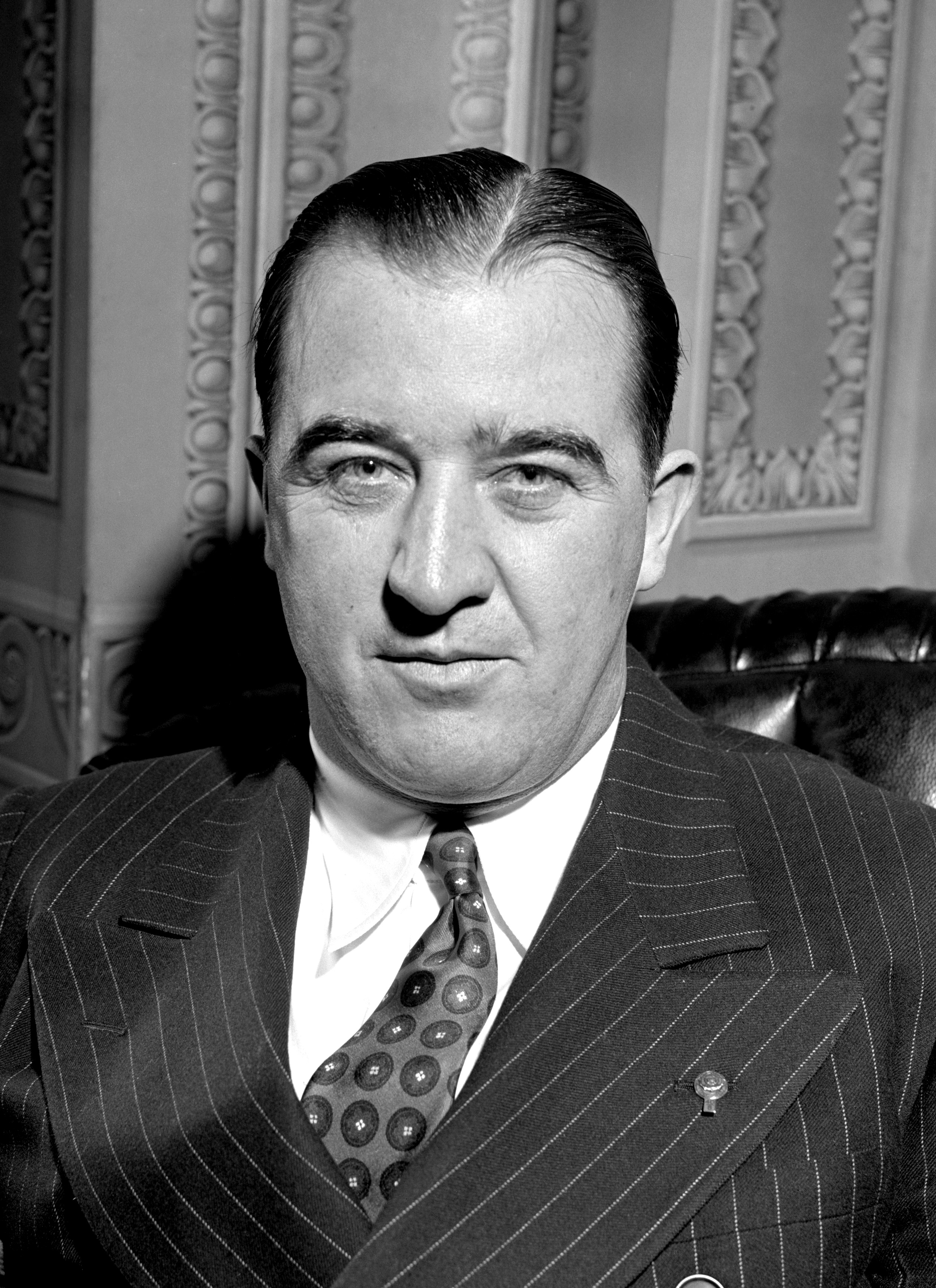
Happy Chandler, Laffoon's lieutenant governor, opposed his call for a state sales tax.

The sales tax proposal caused a rift in the Democratic party generally and in Laffoon's administration specifically. As presiding officer of the Senate, Lieutenant Governor A. B. "Happy" Chandler had led opposition to the tax in the legislature. Highway Commissioner Ben Johnson sided with Chandler, as did former Laffoon supporters Allie Young and J. Dan Talbott. In retaliation, Laffoon vetoed $7 million in appropriations and a measure to cut property taxes at the end of the legislative session. Among the few pieces of legislation that passed during the session were bills reorganizing the highway department, making the state Board of Charities a partisan entity, and further removing the Fish and Game Commission from the control of sportsmen. A redistricting bill was hastily passed at the end of the session, reducing the number of congressional districts from 11 to 9, per the most recent census results, but charges of gerrymandering kept the bill tied up in the courts, preventing it from taking effect in time for the 1932 congressional elections. Consequently, all of Kentucky's representatives that year were elected at-large. The Louisville Courier-Journal called the 1932 legislative session "about the worst legislative session in Kentucky's history".

Laffoon responded to the economic crisis by declaring a four-day banking holiday to begin on March 1, 1933. He twice extended the holiday, which finally ended on March 18. Responding to complaints of low prices by farmers, he closed burley tobacco markets in December of that year. At the end of the 1932 fiscal year, figures showed that the state incurred a $2 million deficit. Kentucky was also unable to secure significant financial assistance under President Franklin D. Roosevelt's New Deal because the state was often unable to raise the required matching funds.

Though Laffoon was determined to pass a state sales tax, he vowed not to call a special legislative session to consider the issue. However, in August 1933, he did call a special session to debate a "gross receipts tax", which was essentially a sales tax by another name. Johnson and Chandler again led the opposition to Laffoon's plan; Laffoon called them, along with Allie Young and U.S. Representative John Y. Brown Sr., "the most insidious lobby that ever infected the Capitol". He reportedly further charged that opposition to his tax program was financed by "a bunch of New York Jews". Despite Laffoon's rhetoric, the sales tax was again defeated.

The General Assembly was split three ways when it convened in 1934. Approximately one-third of the Assembly was Republican, one-third was pro-Laffoon Democrats, and one third was anti-Laffoon Democrats. Using the promise of new roads in Republican districts as leverage, Laffoon and political boss Tom Rhea formed an alliance with the Republicans. The bipartisan alliance succeeded in enacting several measures to benefit education, including establishing a Council on Public Higher Education, extending the school year to six "or more" months, and mandating school attendance until age sixteen. Additional revenue was generated by increasing the tax on whiskey from 2 cents to 5 cents per gallon. Laffoon's bipartisan alliance also passed a governmental reorganization bill that reduced the number of state commissions and departments from 69 to 24, cutting several jobs from the state payroll. The real target of the bill, however, was Laffoon's political enemies. The bill curbed the powers of the lieutenant governor and state auditor, both Laffoon opponents. The lieutenant governor was removed from his post as president of the Kentucky Senate. The bill also empowered the governor to remove any appointed state official.

Having neutralized opponents of the sales tax, Laffoon encouraged legislators to lower the state income and automobile taxes, which he believed would leave no alternative source of revenue except a sales tax. The General Assembly passed the requested cuts, and in July 1934, Laffoon called another special session to consider the sales tax. Pro-administration officials organized parades and demonstrations in favor of the tax. By contrast, a group of 100 unemployed men marched on Frankfort demanding financial relief. Some of them made death threats against Laffoon, and the Kentucky National Guard surrounded the governor's mansion to protect him. Although anti-sales-tax forces used parliamentary procedures that stalled a vote for weeks, a three percent sales tax was approved by the end of the session. The tax was derided in a children's chant that said "Hippity-hop to the toy shop to buy a red balloon. A penny for you, a penny for me, a penny for Ruby Laffoon." Following the special session, Laffoon was admitted to a sanatorium, where he was treated for exhaustion.

=== Role in the 1935 gubernatorial race ===
As his term neared expiration, Laffoon removed Ben Johnson from his post as highway commissioner, replacing him with Tom Rhea. This move was made in order to groom Rhea to be the next governor. Due to the influence of Laffoon and Rhea, the Democratic Party again chose a nominating convention in lieu of a primary to choose their gubernatorial candidate. Because Laffoon supporters controlled the state Democratic Central Committee and most of the county political organizations, a convention would favor Laffoon's choice of gubernatorial nominee. The convention was scheduled for May 14, 1935, in Lexington.

On January 5, 1935, Laffoon traveled to Washington, D.C. to meet with President Roosevelt. Although Laffoon said the purpose of his trip was to discuss further federal aid for Kentucky, his opponents maintained he had gone to explain the lack of a primary to the president. (Roosevelt had written a letter to the state Democratic Central Committee encouraging them to adopt a primary.) Due to Laffoon's absence from the state, Lieutenant Governor Chandler was left as acting governor under the provisions of the Kentucky Constitution. On February 6, Chandler issued a proclamation calling a special session of the legislature on February 8 to consider a bill requiring a primary election to select nominees for all state offices. Laffoon rushed back to the state, arriving in Ashland on February 7, and immediately issued a proclamation revoking Chandler's call. Franklin County legislator John Gatewood obtained an injunction against Laffoon's order, and pro-primary legislators gathered in Frankfort on February 8. These members failed to achieve a quorum on February 8, 9 and 11. On February 11, six legislators sought a declaratory judgment to see if Laffoon's revocation was legal. The Franklin County Circuit Court upheld Chandler's call and invalidated Laffoon's revocation, and the Kentucky Court of Appeals, then the court of last resort in the state, upheld this decision by a 4–3 majority.

On February 13, the Kentucky House achieved a quorum, and the Senate did so the following day. Having lost the battle against the special session, Laffoon proposed a primary with a run-off if no candidate received a majority on the first ballot. Some, including Chandler, believed this action was aimed against former governor and senator J. C. W. Beckham, who Laffoon believed would challenge Rhea for the Democratic nomination. They believed that a double primary would be too much for the aging Beckham to endure. Supporters of a single primary found they did not have the votes in the legislature to pass it, so they agreed to a double primary, which Laffoon signed into law on February 27, 1935.

Seven candidates declared their candidacy for the Democratic nomination, including Rhea and Lieutenant Governor Chandler. Former governor Beckham was not a candidate; his only son had died in late 1934, devastating his family and leaving his wife strongly opposed to another political campaign. Near the end of the primary campaign, Laffoon suffered an attack of appendicitis and required an appendectomy, leaving him unable to campaign for Rhea. Two candidates dropped out of the race prior to the election.

On the day of the primary, Adjutant General Denhardt took National Guard troops into Harlan County, which was known for its history of election violence. The troops questioned voters, examined ballot boxes, and made several arrests. These actions were in direct violation of a restraining order issued by circuit court judge James M. Gilbert, but Denhardt claimed to be acting on orders from Laffoon. Denhardt later reported that "We stopped the most stupendous, well-planned election steal ever attempted in Kentucky. Chandler would have gotten 15,000 votes had we not been here." Denhardt was later arrested and charged with contempt of court for violating the restraining order.

In the primary, Rhea achieved a plurality of the votes, but not a majority. Chandler had the next highest vote total, and the two faced each other in a run-off on September 7, 1935. In the run-off, Chandler defeated Rhea, securing the nomination for governor. President Roosevelt, not wanting Democratic factionalism to cost him votes in the 1936 presidential election, attempted to bring together the Laffoon and Chandler factions, but to little avail. Laffoon and Rhea, along with most of Laffoon's administration, bolted the party and supported Republican nominee King Swope. Despite losing the support of his predecessor, Chandler went on to win the general election. In his last days in office, Laffoon issued pardons for Denhardt and others charged in connection with the National Guard's interference with the primary in Harlan County. These were among a record 560 pardons issued by Laffoon, most of which were to relieve prison crowding.

== Later life ==
During his gubernatorial campaign, Laffoon had promised not to seek higher office if elected governor. Term-limited by the state constitution, he returned to private life following his four years in office. On the day of Chandler's inauguration, Laffoon said "I'm going to Madisonville right after the inauguration, and I hope to get some clients at my law office by Wednesday morning."

Shortly after Chandler's inauguration, attorney general Beverly M. Vincent opined that Kentucky Colonel commissions expired at the end of the commissioning governor's term. Laffoon vigorously defended the commissions he had issued and those issued by his predecessors. On April 27, 1936, when both Governor Chandler and Lieutenant Governor Keen Johnson attended a baseball game in Cincinnati, President Pro Tem of the Senate James Eugene Wise was left as acting governor and recommissioned all 17,000 existing colonels.

Laffoon was a member of the Democratic National Committee in 1936, but decided not to attend the national convention. He chose Urey Woodson to serve as his proxy, but Woodson declined to attend as well and turned the proxy over to Fred M. Vinson. Laffoon also backed Senator M. M. Logan's re-election bid in 1936. He was a delegate to the Democratic National Convention in 1940, and despite his differences with President Roosevelt during his gubernatorial term, he supported Roosevelt's re-election.

Defying a doctor's order not to work for two weeks due to high blood pressure, Laffoon presided for three days as a special judge in the Union County Circuit Court in February 1941. On February 17, 1941, he returned home early from his law office due to a bout of dizziness. It was reported that he had suffered a stroke, and after a mild improvement, his condition worsened again and he died on March 1, 1941, at 2:50 am. He was buried in Grapevine Cemetery in Madisonville.

Political offices
Preceded by Flem D. Sampson	Governor of Kentucky; 1931–1935	Succeeded by Happy Chandler
Party political offices
Preceded by J. C. W. Beckham	Democratic nominee for Governor of Kentucky; 1931	Succeeded by Happy Chandler
