= Martin Sennet Conner =

American politician (1891–1950)

Mike Conner
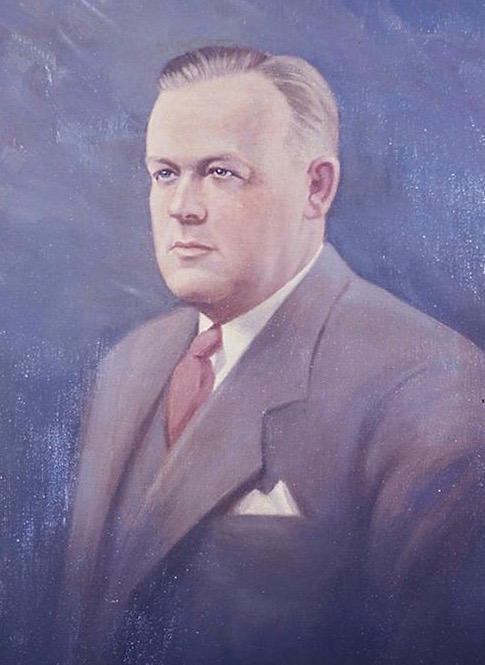

44th Governor of Mississippi
- In office January 19, 1932 – January 21, 1936
- Lieutenant: Dennis Murphree
- Preceded by: Theodore G. Bilbo
- Succeeded by: Hugh L. White

Member of the Mississippi House of Representatives from the Covington County district
- In office January 1916 – January 1924

Personal details
- Born: August 31, 1891 Hattiesburg, Mississippi, U.S.
- Died: September 16, 1950 (aged 59) Jackson, Mississippi, U.S.
- Resting place: Lakewood Memorial Park in Jackson, Mississippi
- Party: Democratic
- Spouse: Alma Lucille Graham
- Profession: Lawyer

Martin "Mike" Sennet Conner (August 31, 1891 – September 16, 1950) was an American politician, lawyer, and college sports administrator who served as the governor of Mississippi from 1932 to 1936.

== Early life and education ==
Martin Conner was born in Forrest County, Mississippi in August 1891 to Oscar Weir (1868-1923) and Holly Gertrude (née Sennett) Conner (1871-1937). In 1900, his family moved to rural Seminary in Covington County in southern Mississippi, where Conner likely obtained his high school education at the Seminary Attendance Center (now Seminary High School).

Conner began his education at the University of Mississippi in Oxford at the age of 14 years, likely the youngest person to attend the university along with Enoch Starnes. He continued his education at Yale University in New Haven, Connecticut, after which he began a legal career in Seminary.

== Political career ==
Conner served as a member of the Mississippi House of Representatives from 1916 to 1924, and served a stint as Speaker of the House. In 1931, Conner was elected Governor of Mississippi.

Conner was allied with Huey Long, the governor of Louisiana from 1928 to 1932 and the U.S. senator from 1932 to 1935. Long struck up an alliance with Conner to support "good roads" connecting the neighboring states. From the sidelines, Long helped Conner win the Mississippi governorship though Conner had twice lost previous bid for the office. Conner's runoff election opponent and gubernatorial successor, Hugh L. White, tried to make an issue of Long's involvement in an out-of-state race.

Conner's term as a governor corresponded with the Great Depression, but he maintained a state treasury surplus during his tenure. He was noted for going to the state penitentiary to preside over "mercy courts" that resulted in executive clemency for prisoners. One of Conner's methods by which he orchestrated a positive $16 million swing in the state's finances (in only four years) was the introduction of a state sales tax.

In 1936, Conner ran for U.S. Senate against incumbent Democrat Pat Harrison. He received the support of U.S. Senator Theodore Bilbo. Harrison ultimately won the election.

Conner was an opponent of the New Deal.

== Life after politics ==
On August 20, 1940, Conner was selected to be the first commissioner of the Southeastern Conference (SEC). He took office on September 1, 1940. He was granted a leave of absence in May 1947 due to illness. He resigned on September 12, 1947. Conner died on September 16, 1950 in Jackson, Mississippi and is interred there at Lakewood Memorial Park.

Party political offices
Preceded by Theodore G. Bilbo	Democratic nominee for Governor of Mississippi; 1931	Succeeded by Hugh L. White
Political offices
Preceded by Theodore G. Bilbo	Governor of Mississippi; 1932–1936	Succeeded by Hugh L. White
Sporting positions
