= William B. Harrison =

American politician (1889–1948)

William Benjamin Harrison
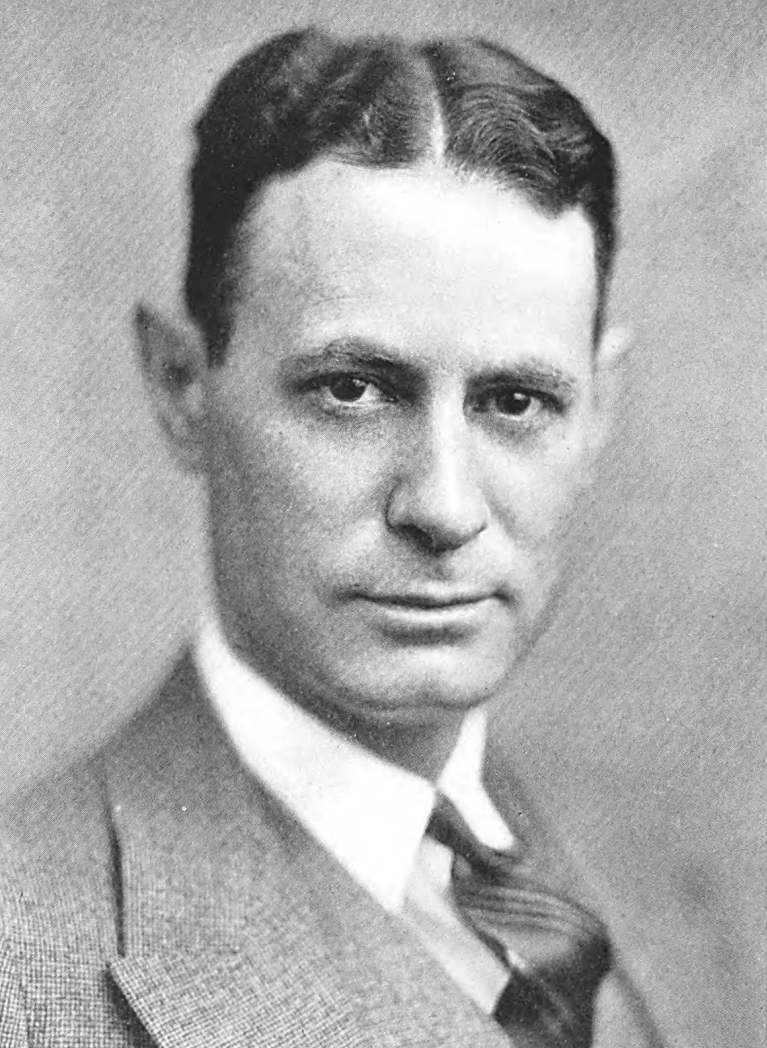
- Harrison, c. 1929

41st Mayor of Louisville
- In office 1927–1933
- Preceded by: Joseph T. O'Neal
- Succeeded by: Neville Miller

Personal details
- Born: July 28, 1889 Louisville, Kentucky, U.S.
- Died: July 13, 1948 (aged 58) Wequetonsing, Michigan, U.S.
- Resting place: Cave Hill Cemetery; Louisville, Kentucky, U.S.
- Party: Republican
- Education: University of Virginia School of Law

William Benjamin Harrison (July 28, 1889 – July 13, 1948) was the 41st mayor of Louisville, Kentucky, from 1927 to 1933.

Harrison ran for Governor of Kentucky in 1931 but lost the election to Democrat Ruby Laffoon.

== Life ==
He graduated from Louisville Male High School in 1907 and the University of Virginia School of Law in 1910. He served as a captain in the United States Army during World War I. From 1922 to 1929, he was president of the Kentucky Refrigerating Company.

He was elected mayor in 1927 after the Kentucky Court of Appeals threw out the election of Arthur A. Will. He was re-elected to a full term in 1929. As mayor, Harrison arranged the finances for the construction of the Municipal Bridge (later renamed George Rogers Clark Memorial Bridge), securing private financing after a bond initiative failed. He also supported the purchase of the Von Zedtwitz estate, with the goal of establishing Bowman Field, the city's first airport. Numerous suburbs surrounding the airport were also carved out of the property.

Harrison ran for governor of Kentucky in 1931 but was defeated by Ruby Laffoon. After his term as mayor, Harrison served as chairman of the Louisville Industrial Foundation for 14 years. He died in 1948 and was buried in Cave Hill Cemetery.

Political offices
Preceded by Joseph T. O'Neal	Mayor of Louisville; 1927–1933	Succeeded by Neville Miller
Party political offices
Preceded by Flem D. Sampson	Republican nominee for Governor of Kentucky; 1931	Succeeded by King Swope
