= 1931 Mississippi gubernatorial election =

1931 Mississippi Democratic gubernatorial primary runoff
- November 3, 1931
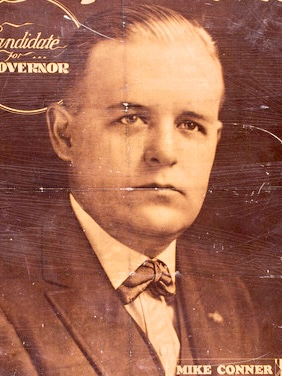

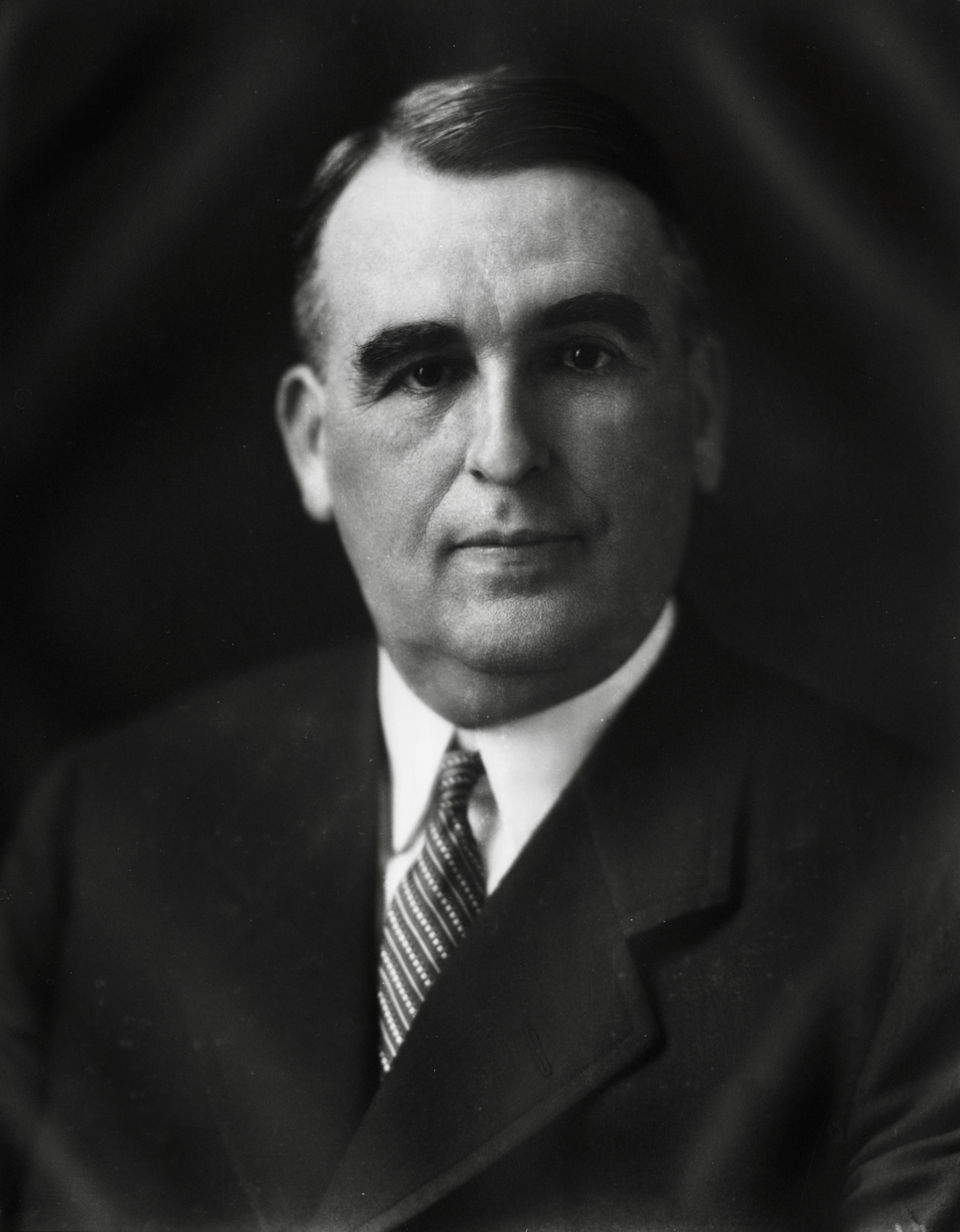
Nominee	Martin S. Conner	Hugh L. White
Party	Democratic	Democratic
Popular vote	170,690	144,918
Percentage	54.08%	45.92%
- County results Conner: 50–60% 60–70% 70–80% White: 50–60% 60–70% 70–80%
Governor before election
Theodore G. Bilbo
Democratic
Elected Governor
Martin S. Conner
Democratic

The 1931 Mississippi gubernatorial election took place on November 3, 1931, in order to elect the Governor of Mississippi. Incumbent Democrat Theodore G. Bilbo was term-limited, and could not run for reelection to a second term. As was common at the time, the Democratic candidate ran unopposed in the general election, so therefore the Democratic primary was the real contest, and winning the primary was considered tantamount to election.

== Democratic primary ==
No candidate received a majority in the Democratic primary, which featured four contenders, so a runoff was held between the top two candidates. The runoff election was won by former state representative Martin S. Conner, who defeated Mayor of Columbia Hugh L. White.

=== Results ===
Mississippi Democratic gubernatorial primary, 1931
Party	Candidate	Votes	%
Democratic	Hugh L. White	108,022	34.51
Democratic	Martin S. Conner	92,089	29.42
Democratic	Paul B. Johnson Sr.	58,668	18.75
Democratic	George Mitchell	54,202	17.32
Total votes		312,981	100.00

=== Runoff ===
Mississippi Democratic gubernatorial primary runoff, 1931
Party	Candidate	Votes	%
Democratic	Martin S. Conner	170,690	54.08
Democratic	Hugh L. White	144,918	45.92
Total votes		315,608	100.00

== General election ==
In the general election, Conner ran unopposed.

=== Results ===
Mississippi gubernatorial election, 1931
Party	Candidate	Votes	%
Democratic	Martin S. Conner	45,942	100.00
Total votes		45,942	100.00
Democratic hold			
