= 1931 Kentucky gubernatorial election =

- November 3, 1931
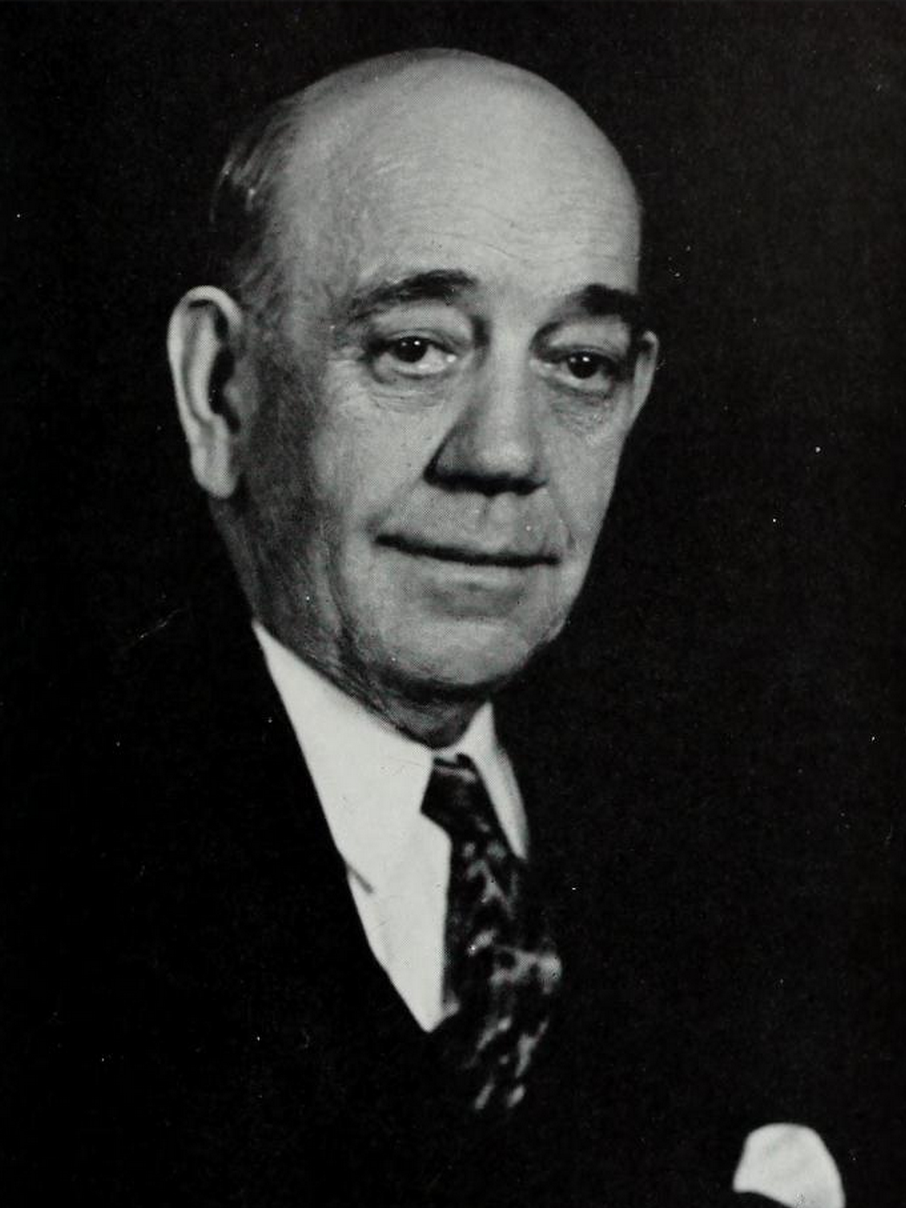

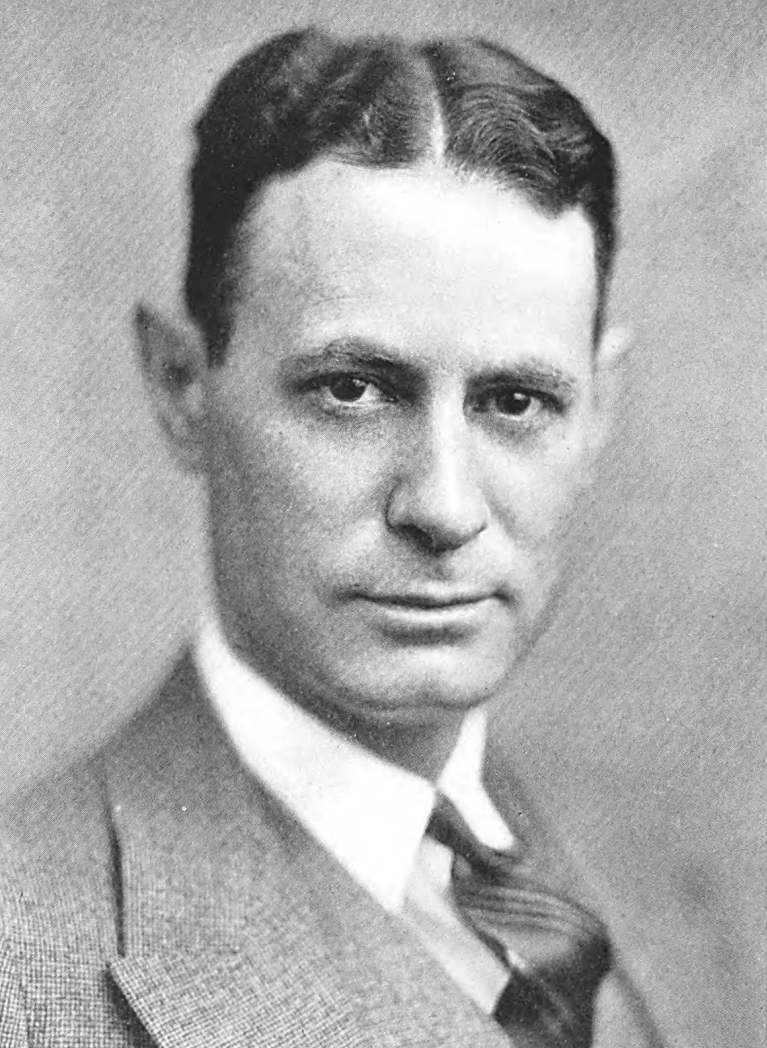
Nominee	Ruby Laffoon	William B. Harrison
Party	Democratic	Republican
Popular vote	438,513	366,982
Percentage	54.28%	45.43%
- Laffoon: 50–60% 60–70% 70–80% 80–90% 90–100% Harrison: 50–60% 60–70% 70–80% 80–90% No vote
Governor before election
Flem D. Sampson
Republican
Elected Governor
Ruby Laffoon
Democratic

The 1931 Kentucky gubernatorial election was held on November 3, 1931. Democratic nominee Ruby Laffoon defeated Republican nominee William B. Harrison with 54.28% of the vote. Incumbent Republican Governor Flemon “Flem” Sampson was term-limited.

== General election ==
=== Candidates ===
Major party candidates

- Ruby Laffoon, Democratic
- William B. Harrison, Republican

Other candidates

- John J. Thobe, Socialist
- Herman Hornung, Socialist Labor

=== Results ===
1931 Kentucky gubernatorial election
Party	Candidate	Votes	%	±%
Democratic	Ruby Laffoon	438,513	54.28	+6.38
Republican	William B. Harrison	366,982	45.43	−6.66
Socialist	John J. Thobe	1,163	0.14	N/A
Socialist Labor	Herman Hornung	1,148	0.14	N/A
Total votes		807,806	100.0	N/A
Democratic gain from Republican				
