= Interracial marriage in the United States =

U.S. states, by date of repeal of anti-miscegenation laws: No laws passed Repealed before 1888 Repealed between 1948 and 1967 Overturned June 12, 1967

Interracial marriage has been legal throughout the United States since at least the 1967 U.S. Supreme Court (Warren Court) decision Loving v. Virginia (1967) that held that anti-miscegenation laws were unconstitutional via the 14th Amendment adopted in 1868. Chief Justice Earl Warren wrote in the court opinion that "the freedom to marry, or not marry, a person of another race resides with the individual, and cannot be infringed by the State." Interracial marriages have been formally protected by federal statute through the Respect for Marriage Act since 2022.

Historical opposition to interracial marriage was frequently based on religious principles. Many Southern evangelical Christians saw racial segregation, including in marriage, as something divinely instituted from God. They held that legal recognition of interracial couples would violate biblical teaching and hence their religious liberty. Roman Catholic theology, on the other hand, articulated strong opposition to any state-sanctioned segregation on the grounds that segregation violated human dignity. Although the Catholic Church did have a history of supporting segregation previously. Since Loving, states have repealed their defunct bans, the last of which was Alabama in a 2000 referendum.

Public approval of interracial marriage rose from 5% in the 1950s to 94% in 2021. The number of interracial marriages as a proportion of new marriages has increased from 3% in 1967 to 19% in 2019.

== Historical background ==
The first recorded interracial marriage in what is today the United States took place in 1565 in New Spain, when Luisa de Ábrego, a free black Hispanic woman from Andalucía, and Miguel Rodriguez, from Segovia, married in St. Augustine, Florida. 50 years later, the first recorded interracial marriage in a British North American colony was that of Matoaka, presently better known as "Pocahontas", the daughter of a Powhatan chief, who married tobacco planter John Rolfe in 1614. The first law prohibiting interracial marriage was passed by the Maryland General Assembly in 1691. The Quaker Zephaniah Kingsley published a treatise, reprinted 3 times, on the benefits of intermarriage, which according to Kingsley produced healthier and more beautiful children, and better citizens. Before the Civil War, interracial unions were not rare in the American South. They typically involved White men paired with Black women. Unions of Black men with White women were rarer, but also not very well documented, and therefore possibly forgotten by history.

While opposed to slavery, in a speech in Charleston, Illinois in 1858, Abraham Lincoln stated, "I am not, nor ever have been in favor of making voters or jurors of negroes, nor of qualifying them to hold office, nor to intermarry with white people. I as much as any man am in favor of the superior position assigned to the white race". By 1924, the ban on interracial marriage was still in force in 29 states. While interracial marriage had been legal in California since 1948, in 1957 actor Sammy Davis Jr. faced a backlash for his relationship with a white woman, actress Kim Novak. In 1958, Davis briefly married a black woman, actress and dancer Loray White, to protect himself from mob violence.

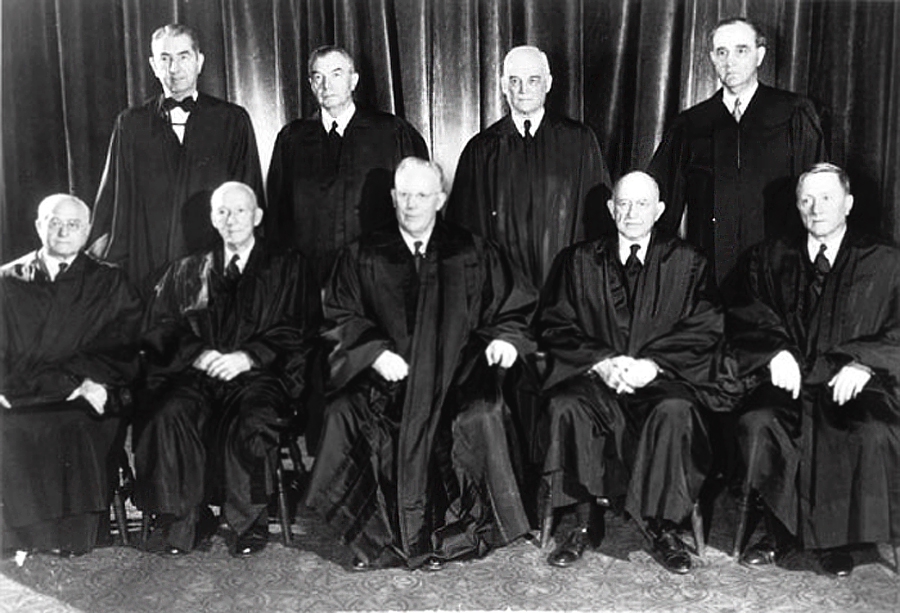
In Loving v. Virginia (1967), the U.S. Supreme Court ruled unanimously that prohibiting interracial marriage was unconstitutional via the 14th Amendment adopted in 1868

In Social Trends in America and Strategic Approaches to the Negro Problem (1948), Swedish economist Gunnar Myrdal ranked the social areas where restrictions were imposed on the freedom of Black Americans by Southern White Americans through racial segregation, from the least to the most important: basic public facility access, social equality, jobs, courts and police, politics and marriage. This ranking scheme illustrates the manner in which the barriers against desegregation fell: Of less importance was the segregation in basic public facilities, which was abolished with the Civil Rights Act of 1964. However, the most tenacious form of legal segregation, the banning of interracial marriage, was not fully lifted until the last anti-miscegenation laws were struck down by the U.S. Supreme Court under Chief Justice Earl Warren in a unanimous ruling Loving v. Virginia. The court's landmark decision, which was made on June 12, 1967, has been commemorated and celebrated every year on the Loving Day (June 12) in the United States.

== Academic research ==
=== Cultural aspects ===
The differing ages of individuals, culminating in the generation divides, have traditionally played a large role in how mixed-ethnic couples are perceived in American society. Interracial marriages have typically been highlighted through two points of view in the United States: Egalitarianism and cultural conservatism. Egalitarianism's view of interracial marriage is acceptance of the phenomenon, while traditionalists view interracial marriage as taboo and as socially unacceptable. Egalitarian viewpoints typically are held by younger generations, however older generations have an inherent influence on the views of the younger. Gurung & Duong (1999) compiled a study relating to mixed-ethnic relationships ("MER"s) and same-ethnic relationships ("SER"s), concluding that individuals part of "MER"s generally do not view themselves differently from same-ethnic couples. Research led by Barnett, Burma, and Monahan in 1963 and 1971 showed people who marry outside of their race are usually older and are more likely to live in an urban setting. Social enterprise research conducted on behalf of the Columbia Business School (2005–2007) showed that regional differences within the United States in how interracial relationships are perceived have persisted: Daters of both sexes from south of the Mason–Dixon line were found to have much stronger same-race preferences than northern daters did. The study also observed a clear gender divide in racial preference with regards to marriage: Women of all the races which were studied revealed a strong preference for men of their own race for marriage, with the caveat that East Asian women only discriminated against Black and Hispanic men, and not against White men. A woman's race was found to have no effect on the men's choices.

=== Socioeconomic aspects ===
Several studies have found that a factor which significantly affects an individual's choices with regards to marriage is socioeconomic status ("SES")—the measure of a person's income, education, social class, profession, etc. For example, a study by the Centre for Behaviour and Evolution, Newcastle University confirmed that women show a tendency to marry up in socioeconomic status; this reduces the probability of marriage of low SES men.

Research at the universities of Alabama at Birmingham (UAB) and Texas A&M addressing the topic of socioeconomic status, among other factors, showed that none of the socioeconomic status variables appeared to be positively related to outmarriage within the Asian American community, and found lower-socioeconomically stable Asians sometimes utilized outmarriage to Whites as a means to advance social status.

=== Marital stability ===
A 2008 study by Jenifer Bratter and Rosalind King conducted on behalf of the Education Resources Information Center examined whether crossing racial boundaries increased the risk of divorce. Comparisons across marriage cohorts revealed that, overall, interracial couples have higher rates of divorce, particularly for those that married during the late 1980s. A 2009 study by Yuanting Zhang and Jennifer Van Hook also found that interracial couples were at increased risk of divorce. One consistent finding of this research is that gender is significantly related to divorce risk. Interracial marriages involving a White woman have a higher risk of divorce, as compared with interracial marriages involving Asian or Black women.

According to authors Stella Ting-Toomey and Tenzin Dorjee, the increased risk of divorce observed in couples with a White wife may be related to decreased support from family members and friends. They note that White women were viewed as "unqualified" by their non-White in-laws to raise and nurture mixed race children, due to their lack of experience in "navigating American culture as a minority". A 2018 study by Jennifer Bratter and Ellen Whitehead found that white women with mixed race children were less likely to receive family support than were non-white women with mixed race children.

In one study, White women married to Black men were more likely to report incidents of racial discrimination in public, such as inferior restaurant service or police profiling, compared to other interracial pairings. Such prejudicial factors may place these marriages at an increased risk of divorce. A study published in 2008 reported a lower risk of divorce for inter-ethnic marriages between Hispanics and non-Hispanic Whites. However, another study, published in 2011, found that these intermarriages were still at higher risk of divorce relative to endogamous Hispanic/Latino marriage (but not relative to endogamous non-Hispanic White marriage).

== Census Bureau statistics ==
The number of interracial marriages has steadily continued to increase since the 1967 U.S. Supreme Court ruling in Loving v. Virginia, but also continues to represent an absolute minority among the total number of wed couples. According to Pew Research, among all newlyweds, intermarried pairings were primarily White-Hispanic (43.3%) as compared to White-Asian (14.4%), White-Black (11.9%), and Other Combinations (30.4%). According to the U.S. Census Bureau, the number of interracially married couples has increased from 310,000 in 1970 to 651,000 in 1980, to 964,000 in 1990, to 1,464,000 in 2000 and to 2,340,000 in 2008; accounting for 0.7%, 1.3%, 1.8%, 2.6% and 3.9% of the total number of married couples in those years, respectively.

These statistics do not take into account the mixing of ancestries within the same "race"; e.g. a marriage involving Indian and Japanese ancestries would not be classified as interracial due to the Census regarding both as the same category. Likewise, since Hispanic is not a race but an ethnicity, Hispanic marriages with non-Hispanics are not registered as interracial if both partners are of the same race (i.e. a Black Hispanic marrying a non-Hispanic Black partner).

Married couples in the United States in 2010
	White wife			Black wife			Asian wife			Other wife			Total	
White husband	50,410,000	97.9%	97.7%	168,000	3.9%	0.3%	529,000	15.3%	1.0%	487,000	42.4%	0.9%	51,594,000	100%
Black husband	390,000	0.8%	8.6%	4,072,000	95.4%	89.2%	39,000	1.1%	0.9%	66,000	5.7%	1.3%	4,567,000	100%
Asian husband	219,000	0.4%	7.0%	9,000	0.2%	0.3%	2,855,000	82.5%	91.8%	28,000	2.4%	0.9%	3,112,000	100%
Other husband	488,000	0.9%	44.0%	18,000	0.4%	1.6%	37,000	1.1%	3.4%	568,000	49.4%	51.0%	1,111,000	100%
Total	51,507,000	100%		4,267,000	100%		3,460,000	100%		1,149,000	100%		60,384,000	

– Percentages for race and wife
– Percentages for race and husband

Based on these figures:

- White Americans were statistically the least likely to wed interracially, though in absolute terms they were involved in interracial marriages more than any other racial group due to their demographic majority. Outside of their own group, White Americans are most frequently married to Hispanics. 2.1% of married White women and 2.3% of married White men had a non-White spouse. 1.0% of all married White men were married to an Asian American woman, and 1.0% of married White women were married to a man classified as "other".
- 4.6% of married Black American women and 10.8% of married Black American men had a non-Black spouse. 8.5% of married Black men and 3.9% of married Black women had a White spouse. 0.2% of married Black women were married to Asian American men, representing the least prevalent marital combination.
- There is a notable disparity in the rates of exogamy by Asian American males and females. Of all Asian American/White marriages, only 29% involved an Asian American male and a White female. However Indian American males married more non-Indians than females, although Indian Americans displayed the highest rates of endogamy, with very low levels of outmarriage overall. Of all Asian American/Black marriages only 19% involved an Asian American male and a Black female. 17.5% of married Asian American women and 8.2% of married Asian American men had a non-Asian American spouse.
- The second most common interracial marriage in the United States is an Asian American female married to a White American male, this is followed by a White American female married to a Black American male.

In 2006, 88% of foreign-born White Hispanic males were married to White Hispanic females. In terms of out-marriage, Hispanic males who identified as White had non-Hispanic wives more often than other Hispanic men.

=== 2008 Pew Research Center Report ===
The table (U.S. Census Bureau's 2008 American Community Survey) shows that among whites who out-married in 2008, there were different patterns by gender in the race of their spouses. More than a quarter of white men (26.9%) married an Asian woman, and about 6.9% married a black woman. In contrast, 20.1% of white women married a black man, while just 9.4% married an Asian man. A slightly higher proportion of white women than white men married a Hispanic person (51% versus 46%), and a similar share of each gender married someone in the other group.

Percentage of all new marriages in 2008 Who "out-married" by race/ethnicity of spouse
	Hispanic	Black	Asian	Other
White husband	46.1%	6.9%	26.9%	20.1%
White wife	51.4%	20.1%	9.4%	19.1%
	White	Hispanic	Asian	Other
Black husband	57.2%	21.9%	7.0%	13.9%
Black wife	58.6%	24.2%	5.5%	11.6%
	White	Black	Asian	Other
Hispanic husband	83.3%	4.5%	5.3%	7.0%
Hispanic wife	77.5%	13.2%	4.0%	5.2%
	White	Black	Hispanic	Other
Asian husband	70.9%	4.8%	17.7%	6.7%
Asian wife	76.8%	7.2%	9.5%	6.6%
^{1} (%) Percentage of all New Marriages that are Interracial or Interethnic - 2008 ACS^{2} "Newly married" refers to people who got married in the 12 months before the survey.^{3} (Hispanics are an ethnic group, not a racial group. E.g.: White, Black, Mestizo)

The study found that in 2008:

- A record 14.6% of all new marriages in the United States in 2008 were between spouses of a different race or ethnicity from one another. This compares to 8.0% of all current marriages regardless of when they occurred. This includes marriages between a Hispanic and non-Hispanic (Hispanics are an ethnic group, not a race) as well as marriages between spouses of different races – be they white, black, Asian, American Indian or those who identify as being of multiple races or some other race.
- Among all newlyweds in 2008, 9% of whites, 16% of blacks, 26% of Hispanics and 31% of Asians married someone whose race or ethnicity was different from their own.
- Among all newlyweds in 2008, intermarried pairings were primarily White-Hispanic (41%) as compared to White-Asian (15%), White-Black (11%), and Other Combinations (33%). Other combinations consists of pairings between different minority groups, multi-racial people, and American Indians.
- Among all newlyweds in 2008, native-born Hispanics and Asians were far more likely to intermarry than foreign-born Hispanics and Asians: 41.3% of native-born Hispanic men out-married compared to 11.3% of foreign-born Hispanic men; 37.4% of native-born Hispanic women out-married compared to 12.2% of foreign-born Hispanic women; 41.7% of native-born Asian men out-married compared to 11.7% of foreign-born Asian men; 50.8% of native-born Asian women out-married compared to 36.8% of foreign-born Asian women. Foreign-born excludes immigrants who arrived married.
- Gender patterns in intermarriage vary widely. Some 22% of all black male newlyweds in 2008 married outside their race, compared with just 9% of black female newlyweds. Among Asians, the gender pattern runs the other way. Some 40% of Asian female newlyweds married outside their race in 2008, compared with just 20% of Asian male newlyweds. Among whites and Hispanics, by contrast, there are no gender differences in intermarriage rates.
- Rates of intermarriages among newlyweds in the U.S. more than doubled between 1980 (6.7%) and 2008 (14.6%). However, different groups experienced different trends. Rates more than doubled among whites and nearly tripled among blacks. But for both Hispanics and Asians, rates were nearly identical in 2008 and 1980.
- These seemingly contradictory trends were driven by the heavy, ongoing Hispanic and Asian immigration wave of the past four decades. For whites and blacks, these immigrants (and, increasingly, their U.S.-born children who are now of marrying age) have enlarged the pool of potential spouses for out-marriage. But for Hispanics and Asians, the ongoing immigration wave has also enlarged the pool of potential partners for in-group marriage.
- There is a strong regional pattern to intermarriage. Among all new marriages in 2008, 22% in the West were interracial or interethnic, compared with 13% in both the South and Northeast and 11% in the Midwest.
- Most Americans say they approve of racial or ethnic intermarriage – not just in the abstract, but in their own families. More than six-in-ten say it would be fine with them if a family member told them they were going to marry someone from any of three major race/ethnic groups other than their own.
- More than a third of adults (35%) say they have a family member who is married to someone of a different race. Blacks say this at higher rates than do whites; younger adults at higher rates than older adults; and Westerners at higher rates than people living in other regions of the country.

=== 2010 Pew Research Center Report ===
The study (U.S. Census Bureau's 2010 American Community Survey) found that in 2010:

- A record 15.1% of all new marriages in the United States were between spouses of a different race or ethnicity from one another. This compares to 8.4% of all current marriages regardless of when they occurred. This includes marriages between a Hispanic and non-Hispanic (Hispanics are an ethnic group, not a race) as well as marriages between spouses of different races – be they white, black, Asian, American Indian or those who identify as being of multiple races or some other race.
- Among all newlyweds, 9.4% of whites, 17.1% of blacks, 25.7% of Hispanics and 27.7% of Asians married someone whose race or ethnicity was different from their own.
- Among all newlyweds, intermarried pairings were primarily White-Hispanic (43.3%) as compared to White-Asian (14.4%), White-Black (11.9%), and Other Combinations (30.4%). Other combinations consists of pairings between different minority groups, multi-racial people, and American Indians.
- Among all newlyweds, native-born Hispanics and Asians were far more likely to intermarry than foreign-born Hispanics and Asians: 36.2% of native-born Hispanics (both men and women) out-married compared to 14.2% of foreign-born Hispanics; 32% of native-born Asian men out-married compared to 11% of foreign-born Asian men; 43% of native-born Asian women out-married compared to 34% of foreign-born Asian women. Foreign-born excludes immigrants who arrived married.
- Gender patterns in intermarriage vary widely. Some 24% of all black male newlyweds in 2010 married outside their race, compared with just 9% of black female newlyweds. Among Asians, the gender pattern runs the other way. Some 36% of Asian female newlyweds married outside their race in 2010, compared with just 17% of Asian male newlyweds. Among whites and Hispanics, by contrast, there are no gender differences in intermarriage rates.
- Rates of intermarriages among newlyweds in the U.S. have nearly tripled since 1980 (6.7%) increasing to 14.6% in 2008 and 15.1% in 2010.
- There is a strong regional pattern to intermarriage. Among all new marriages in 2010, 22% in the West were interracial or interethnic, compared with 14% in the South, 13% in the Northeast and 11% in the Midwest

=== Interracial Union Formation by Race, Ethnicity, and Gender ===
Black women had the lowest proportion in racially heterogamous unions (11%), followed by white men (12%), white women (16%), and black men (24%). Hispanic men (39%), Asian women (44%) were more likely to be in interracial relationship, respectively, relative to Hispanic women (37%) and Asian men (36%).

== Interracial marriage by pairing ==
=== White and Asian ===
Marriages between white Americans and Asian Americans are increasingly common for both genders in the United States.

Asian Americans of both genders who are U.S.-raised are much more likely to be married to Whites than their non-U.S.-raised counterparts. A 1998 article in The Washington Post states 36% of young Asian Pacific American men born in the United States married White women, and 45% of U.S.-born Asian Pacific American women took White husbands during the year of publication.

The 1960 census showed Asian-White was the most common marriages. White women most common intermarriage pairings with Asian American was with Filipino males (12,000), followed by American Indian males (11,200), followed by Japanese males (3,500) and Chinese males (3,500). For White males, the most common was with Japanese females (21,700), American Indian females (17,500), followed by Filipina females (4,500) and Chinese females (2,900).

Anti-miscegenation laws discouraging marriages between Whites and non-Whites were affecting Asian immigrants and their spouses from the late 17th to early 20th century. By 1910, 28 states prohibited certain forms of interracial marriage. Eight states including Arizona, California, Mississippi, Montana, Nevada, Oregon, Texas, and Utah extended their prohibitions to include people of Asian descent. The laws of Arizona, California, Mississippi, Texas, and Utah referred to "Mongolians". Asians in California were barred by anti-miscegenation laws from marrying White Americans (a group including Hispanic Americans). Nevada and Oregon referred to "Chinese," while Montana listed both "Chinese" and "Japanese" persons. For example, a Eurasian daughter born to an Indian father and Irish mother in Maryland in 1680 was classified as a "mulato" and sold into slavery, and the Bengali revolutionary Tarak Nath Das's White American wife, Mary K. Das, was stripped of her American citizenship for her marriage to an "alien ineligible for citizenship."

In 1918, there was controversy in Arizona when an Indian farmer married the 16-year-old daughter of one of his White tenants. California law did not explicitly bar Filipinos and Whites from marrying, a fact brought to wide public attention by the 1933 California Supreme Court case Roldan v. Los Angeles County; however, the legislature quickly moved to amend the laws to prohibit such marriages as well in the aftermath of the case. Virginia in addition implicitly forbade marriage between white and Asians in the Racial Integrity Act of 1924, which banned marriages between whites and people who had "a trace whatsoever of any blood other than Caucasian" except for people with 1/16 or less Native American ancestry.

Research conducted in the late 1970s in Los Angeles County, California, showed Japanese were, on average, more likely to marry outside of their race compared to Chinese and Koreans in the county. In 1979, 41.2% of Chinese marriages had a spouse of a different race. Koreans had a 27.6% rate of interracial marriages, and Japanese had a rate of 60.6%. The research also showed that, among Asians living in the United States, the percentage of women who married outside their race was higher than the percentage of men. Specifically, Korean American women are involved in a higher percent of interracial marriages than Chinese or Japanese women. The research considered marriages to other Asians outside a person's ethnicity to be interracial marriages, for example, a Korean marrying a Japanese person.

Both Japanese men and Japanese women continued to out marry Americans of non-Japanese origin by a higher rate every year. The number of Japanese women married to American men is doubled to that of Japanese men. Japanese census showed 6,000 American women of various ethnicities (mostly white) married Japanese men. In 1997, 15,000 North American wives and children of non-Japanese origin migrated to Japan as dependent of Japanese male nationals.

In 2006, Asian men with White female married couples 174,000 while vice versa was 530,000.

=== Ashkenazi Jewish and Asian (Jasian) ===
Since the late 20th century, a rise in Jewish-Asian ("Jasian" or "Jew-Asian") marriages has occurred, as covered by numerous press articles from New York Times and NPR to Jewish publications. In 2013, Pew Research Center released subsequent study findings on how 72% of non-Orthodox Jews since 2000 are marrying a non-Jewish person, and the same for 58% of Orthodox Jews, rising over thirty years since the 1990 national survey and "substantially over the last five decades."

Living in modern times where Jews no longer have to be segregated into their own schools (i.e. Yeshivas) or clubs (i.e. Jewish fraternities) etc. leads to opportunities to meet a broader pool of people in society and integration. A 2014 scientific study by geneticists, Shai Carmi, PhD (Hebrew University) et al. published by Nature Communications found that all Ashkenazi Jews descend from 330-350 individuals who were genetically about half-Middle Eastern and half-European, making all Ashkenazi Jews related to the point of being at least 30th cousins or closer. This was confirmed by another 2022 genome study by Shamam Waldman, PhD (also Hebrew University) published by Cell (journal) that modern Ashkenazis descend from a small group, with the original researcher, Shai Carmi, stating, "Whether they're from Israel or New York, the Ashkenazi population today is homogenous genetically."

Notably, test score patterns correlating to race and intelligence, and a shared value in education and achievement, have resulted in the Jewish quota and Asian quota in Ivy League admissions when affirmative action was legal from 1961-2023 (until Students for Fair Admissions v. Harvard won suit for educational discrimination against Asians), with Pershing Square Capital and hedge fund manager, Bill Ackman, writing his Harvard senior thesis titled, Scaling the Ivy Wall: The Jewish and Asian American Experience in Harvard Admissions.

=== Black and White ===
White/Black marriages according to the U.S. Census Bureau
*	1980	1990	2000	2008	2009	2021	2023
Total	167,000	211,000	363,000	481,000	550,000	595,000	677,000
Black husband/ White wife	122,000	150,000	268,000	317,000	354,000	400,000	409,000
White husband/ Black wife	45,000	61,000	95,000	164,000	196,000	195,000	268,000

In the United States, there has been a historical disparity between Black female and Black male exogamy ratios: according to the U.S. Census Bureau, there were 354,000 White female/Black male and 196,000 Black female/White male marriages in March 2009, representing a ratio of 181:100. This traditional disparity has seen a rapid decline over the last two decades, contrasted with its peak in 1981 when the ratio was still 371:100. In 2007, 4.6% of all married Blacks in the United States were wed to a White partner, and 0.4% of all Whites were married to a Black partner.

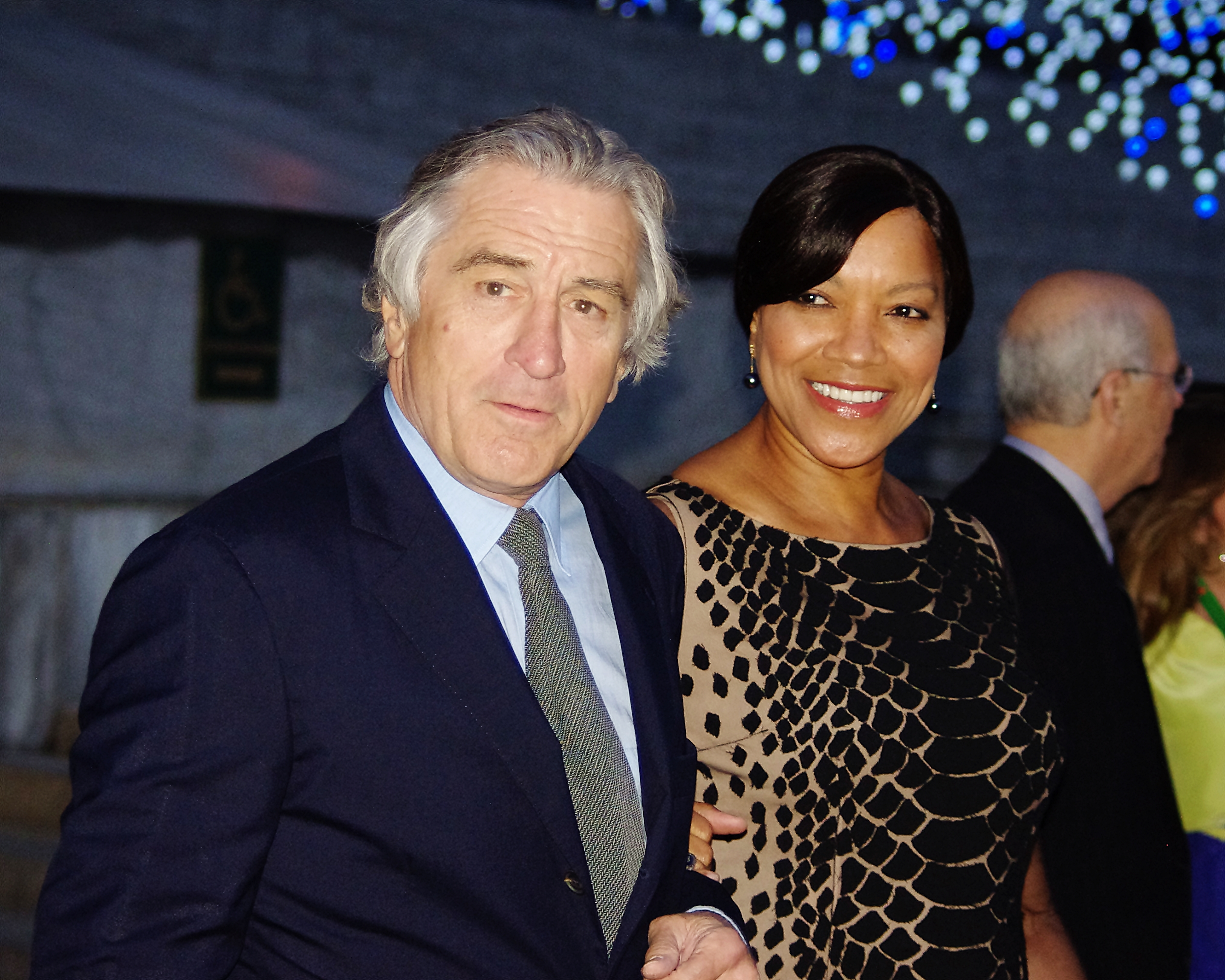
Robert De Niro and his wife Grace Hightower were a prominent interracial couple, shown here at the 2012 Tribeca Film Festival.

The role of gender in interracial divorce dynamics, found in social studies by Jenifer L. Bratter and Rosalind B. King, was highlighted when examining marital instability among Black/White unions. White wife/Black husband marriages show twice the divorce rate of White wife/White husband couples by the 10th year of marriage, whereas Black wife/White husband marriages are 44% less likely to end in divorce than White wife/White husband couples over the same period. According to Census Bureau data Black wife/White husband marriages have the lowest rates of divorce.

According to Census Bureau data in 1985, Black men participated in 143,000 interracial marriages (approximately 3% of all married Black men in the U.S.).

Historically, mixed-race offspring of black and white people such as mulattos and quadroons were often denominated to whichever race had the lower status, an example of the "one-drop rule", as a way to maintain the racial hierarchy. When slavery was legal, most mixed children came from an African American mother and white father. Relations between an African American man and white woman were deeply frowned upon, often due to the frequent portrayal of the men as sexual dangers. (By the 1970s, intermarriages flipped to be more common between a white woman and African American man). Once slavery was abolished, intermarriage was more common among higher educated and more affluent African Americans. There became a balance between racial prestige and socioeconomic prestige in intermarriages. Intermarriage between African Americans and whites was seen as the ultimate objective of integrationism. They believed these intermarriages were the solution to racism and discrimination.

The 1960 and 1970 censuses showed that interracial marriage between black people and white people was least likely to occur in the South and most likely to occur in the West, specifically the West Coast. In the 1960 census, 0.8% of black women and 0.6% of black men in the South were married to a white person. Ten years later, 0.5% of black women and 0.5% of black men in the South were married to a white person. By contrast, in the western U.S., 1.6% of black women and 2.1% of black men had white spouses in the 1960 census; the comparable figures in the 1970 census were 1.6% of black women and 4.9% of black men. In the 1980 census, the percentage of black men in the western U.S. in interracial marriages had increased to 16.5%. However, in 2020, births between blacks and whites were much more common in the South than other regions with approximately half occurring there and were least common in the West due to the low black percentage.

=== Native American and Asian ===
Filipino Americans have frequently married Native American and Alaskan Native people. In the 17th century, when Filipinos were under Spanish rule, the Spanish colonists ensured a Filipino trade between the Philippines and the Americas. When the Mexicans revolted against the Spanish, the Filipinos first escaped into Mexico, then traveled to Louisiana, where the exclusively male Filipinos married Native American women. In the 1920s, Filipino American communities of workers also grew in Alaska, and Filipino American men married Alaskan Native women. On the West Coast, Filipino Americans married Native American women in Bainbridge Island, Washington.

=== Asian and Black ===
With African Americans and Asian Americans, the ratios are even further imbalanced, with roughly five times more Asian female/African male marriages than Asian male/African female marriages. However, C.N. Le estimated that among Asian Americans of the 1.5 generation and of the five largest Asian American ethnic groups this ratio narrows to approximately two to one. Even though the disparity between African American and Asian American interracial marriages by gender is high according to the 2000 U.S. census, the total numbers of Asian American/African American interracial marriages are low, numbering only 0.22% percent for Asian American male marriages and 1.30% percent of Asian female marriages, partially contributed by the recent flux of Asian immigrants.

In the 1960s, marriage census show Black women married (1,110) American Indians, Filipino men (500), Chinese men (300), Japanese men (100) while Black men married Filipino (500), Chinese women (100), Japanese women (1,700), Indian women (2,220).

Historically in the early 20th century, Chinese American men married African American women in high proportions to their total marriage numbers due to few Chinese American women being in the United States. After the Emancipation Proclamation, many Chinese Americans immigrated to the Southern states, particularly Arkansas, to work on plantations. The U.S. census in Louisiana alone had counted 57% of interracial marriages to be between Chinese Americans and African Americans and 43% to be between Chinese Americans European American women. After the Chinese Exclusion Act, Chinese American men had fewer potential ethnically Chinese wives, so they increasingly married African American women on the West Coast. In Jamaica and other Caribbean nations, many Chinese males over past generations took up African wives, gradually assimilating or absorbing many Chinese descendants into the African Caribbean community or the overall mixed-race community.

In the mid 19th to 20th century, Filipino men mostly married black females despite often dated and cohabited white women, due to miscegenation laws. Filipino population in all over United States was made up overwhelmingly of men. For example, in California the Filipino population was 30,470 and in mainland leapt from 5,603 in 1920 to 45,208 ten years later.

=== Native American and White ===
The interracial disparity between genders among Native Americans is low. Women are slightly more likely to "marry out" than men in this group: 61% of American Indian female newlyweds married outside their race, compared with 54% of American Indian male newlyweds.

Historically in Latin America, and to a lesser degree in the United States, Native Americans have married out at a high rate. Many countries in Latin America have large mestizo populations; in many cases, mestizos are the largest ethnic group in their respective countries.

=== Native American and Black ===
In the United States, interracial unions between Native Americans and African Americans have also existed throughout the 16th through early 20th century resulting in some African Americans having Native American heritage.

Throughout American history, there has been frequent mixing between Native Americans and Africans. When Native Americans invaded the European colony of Jamestown, Virginia in 1622, they killed the Europeans but took the African slaves as captives, gradually integrating them. Interracial relationships occurred between African Americans and members of other tribes along coastal states. During the transitional period of Africans becoming the primary race enslaved, Native Americans were sometimes enslaved with them. Africans and Native Americans worked together, some even intermarried and had mixed children. The relationship between Africans and Native Americans was seen as a threat to Europeans and European Americans, who actively tried to divide Native Americans and Africans and put them against each other.

During the 18th century, some Native American women turned to freed or runaway African men due to a major decline in the male population in Native American villages. At the same time, the early slave population in America was disproportionately male. Records show that some Native American women bought African men as slaves. Unknown to European sellers, the women freed and married the men into their tribe.

Some African men chose Native American women as their partners because their children would be free, as the child's status followed that of the mother. The men could marry into some of the matrilineal tribes and be accepted, as their children were still considered to belong to the mother's people. As European expansion increased in the Southeast, African and Native American marriages became more numerous.

== Public opinion ==
Historical data according to Gallup, Inc.

Historically, interracial marriage in the United States was subject to great public opposition (often a taboo), especially among whites. According to opinion polls, by 1986 only one third of Americans approved of interracial marriage in general. In contrast, in 2011, the vast majority of Americans approved of marriages between different races in general, while just 20 years earlier, in 1991, less than half approved.

It was only in 1994 when more than half of Americans approved of such marriages in general. The approval/disapproval rate differs between demographic groups (for example by race, gender, age, and socioeconomic and marital status).

A 2018 YouGov/Economist poll found that 17% of Americans oppose interracial marriage; with 19% of "other" ethnic groups, 18% of blacks, 17% of whites, and 15% of Hispanics opposing.

Attitudes towards interracial marriage can vary depending upon the race of the union and the person judging them.

A 2011 poll, found that 46% of Mississippi Republicans polled said they think interracial marriage should be illegal. A further 14% were not sure.

== Relevant fields ==
=== Marriage squeeze ===
A term has arisen to describe the social phenomenon of the so-called "marriage squeeze" for African American females. The "marriage squeeze" refers to the perception that the most "eligible" and "desirable" African American men are marrying non-African American women at a higher rate, leaving African American women who wish to marry African American men with fewer partnering options. However, data from the National Survey of American Life shows that, across all age groups, African American women are more likely than their male counterparts to report that they neither have nor desire a romantic relationship, and more African American men than women are married or cohabiting — a gap that increases with advanced age.

=== Religion and interracial marriage ===
Historically, many American religious groups disapproved of interracial marriage. According to several studies on the topic by sociologist Samuel L. Perry, religious tradition and church attendance are consistent predictors for attitudes towards interracial marriages. Biblical literalists are less likely to support interracial marriage to Asians and Latinos. Whites who attend multiracial congregations or engage in devotional religious practices are more likely to support interracial marriages. Region also moderates the relationship between religion and interracial dating. Children with a religious upbringing in non-Western states, particularly the South, were less likely to have interracially dated than those without religious upbringings. Religious attitudes combined with Christian nationalism increased opposition to intermarriage more than either attribute measured independently.

According to a Baylor University study "people with no religious affiliation were not statistically more likely to be in intermarriages than evangelical or mainline Protestants or people from other religions" with one exception, Catholics. Catholics were twice as likely to be in an interracial marriage than the general population. It is speculated that the reason for this is twofold: the increasing diversity of the Catholic population (which has seen a huge influx of immigrants) and the fact that Catholics typically base their choice of parish on geography rather than on its ethnic or racial makeup which creates more opportunities for interracial mixing. Jews were also more likely to date interracially than Protestants.

Some religions actively teach against interracial marriages. For example, until 2013, the Church of Jesus Christ of Latter-day Saints recommended against interracial marriages, but did not prohibit it. On the other hand, the Baháʼí Faith promotes interracial marriage as a prerequisite to achieving world peace.

Even into the 20th century, marriage between subcultures of Judaism was rare. Eastern European Jews were the most analyzed subgroup due to having the largest presence in the U.S. During 1908–1912, only 2.27% of Jews in New York City were part of an intermarriage. This figure only rose to 3.6% by 1919. Despite enjoying new freedom in America after escaping the oppression of the Old World, some Jews were still hesitant about interfaith marriage. One of the greatest factors that swayed Jews away from intermarriage was a fear of assimilation and loss of identity. Although the beginnings of a melting pot culture appeared to encourage diversity, it was also seen as a threat to the Jewish culture and religion. However, there was also fear of persecution due to racial tensions and frequent discrimination.

Not all Jews were hesitant about assimilating into American culture. Some early Jewish authors such as Mary Antin were strong proponents of abandoning their Jewish heritage and encouraged interfaith marriage. It was suggested as a way to make immigration easier and reflect positively on the Jews in a time of prevailing discrimination. They believed that intermarriage was beneficial to both the Jewish community and America as a whole.

While intermarriage was relatively common among ethnic groups like the Germans and Italians, the practice of endogamy was still the domineering practice among the newer ethnic groups. It has been found that rates in Jewish intermarriage increase from the initial immigrant wave with each subsequent generation.

=== Immigrants and interracial marriage ===
Racial endogamy is significantly stronger among recent immigrants. This result holds for all racial groups, with the strongest endogamy found among immigrants of African descent. Gender differences in interracial marriage change significantly when the non-White partner is an immigrant. For instance, female immigrants of Chinese descent are more likely to marry U.S.-born Caucasians than are their male counterparts.

=== Interracial marriage versus cohabitation ===
In the United States, rates of interracial cohabitation are significantly higher than those of marriage. Although only 7% of married African American men have European American wives, 12.5% of cohabitating African American men have European American partners. 25% of married Asian American women have European spouses, but 45% of cohabitating Asian American women are with European American men—higher than the percentage cohabiting with Asian men (less than 43%).

Of cohabiting Asian men, slightly over 37% of Asian men have White female partners and over 10% married to White women. These numbers suggest that the prevalence of intimate interracial contact is around double that of what is represented by marriage data.

== See also ==
- Anti-miscegenation cases in the American West
- Anti-miscegenation laws in the United States
- Multiracial Americans
- Race and ethnicity in the United States census
- Same-sex marriage in the United States
