= Wroten =

Wroten is a surname. Notable people with the surname include:

- Claude Wroten (born 1983), American football defensive tackle
- Joe Wroten (1925–2005), American politician
- Tony Wroten (born 1993), American professional basketball player
