= Ira B. Harkey Jr. =

American journalist

Ira B. Harkey Jr. (January 15, 1918 – October 8, 2006) was an American writer, professor of journalism, and editor and publisher of the Pascagoula Chronicle-Star in Mississippi from 1951 to 1963. Harkey was awarded the Pulitzer Prize for Editorial Writing in 1963 for his anti-segregation editorials during the civil rights crisis surrounding the admission of James Meredith, a black man, to the University of Mississippi at Oxford, Mississippi in 1962.

== Life ==
Ira Harkey was born in New Orleans, Louisiana, son of a wealthy businessman. He graduated from Tulane University, where he was a brother with the Delta Kappa Epsilon fraternity (Tau Lambda chapter), with an undergraduate degree in journalism in 1941 and then served aboard the aircraft carrier USS Hancock (CV-19) in the Pacific theater during World War II. After the war, Harkey worked as a reporter for the New Orleans Times-Picayune newspaper. He later wrote of the existence of “a flat rule that Negroes were not to appear in photographs” at the Times-Picayune; it was a standard practice at the newspaper for African Americans to be airbrushed out of crowd scene images.

Harkey purchased the Chronicle-Star in 1949. He immediately began making changes to how the paper wrote about the people who lived in Jackson County, Mississippi. At the time, it was newspaper style convention to refer to white men and women with the "Mr." or "Mrs." honorific but this courtesy was never extended to blacks. Harkey began to add the honorific to black women such as teachers and nurses. He eliminated what was then common practice in Southern newspapers to identify the subjects of an article, if they were black, with the term "colored". Under Harkey's direction, a subject's race was only ever mentioned when it was material to the news, such as a physical description of a fugitive. He published many editorials and the Chronicle Star became known as the one paper that would publish opinions opposed to Ross Barnett, then Governor of Mississippi. In December 1962, Harkey published a series of five articles titled "The Oxford Disaster...Price of Defiance" by Pascagoula lawyer and state legislator Karl Wiesenburg which showed Barnett had no legal basis for his actions.

During the course of his ownership of the Chronicle-Star, Harkey's home was subject to a burning cross on the lawn of his home, and a shot was fired at the Chronicle-Star office. His autobiographical account of his experience owning the paper, The Smell of Burning Crosses, takes its name from that event.

== Works ==
- The Smell of Burning Crosses: A White Integrationist Editor in Mississippi (1967)
- Noel Wein: Alaska Pioneer Bush Pilot (1974)
