= 1952 United States presidential election in Mississippi =

- November 4, 1952

| Nominee | Adlai Stevenson | Dwight D. Eisenhower |
| Party | Democratic | Independent |
| Home state | Illinois | New York |
| Running mate | John Sparkman | Richard Nixon |
| Electoral vote | 8 | 0 |
| Popular vote | 172,566 | 112,966 |
| Percentage | 60.44% | 39.56% |

Stevenson
50–60%
60–70%
70–80%
80–90%
Eisenhower
50–60%
60–70%
President before election
Harry S. Truman
Democratic
Elected President
Dwight D. Eisenhower
Republican

The 1952 United States presidential election in Mississippi took place on November 4, 1952, as part of the United States presidential election of 1952. The Democratic Party candidate, Governor Adlai Stevenson of Illinois, won the state of Mississippi over Dwight D. Eisenhower, the former Supreme Allied Commander Europe and General of the Army by a margin of 59,600 votes, or 20.88 percentage points. Eisenhower went on to win the election nationally, with 442 electoral votes and a commanding 10.9 percent lead over Stevenson in the popular vote.

Mississippi in this time period was a one-party state dominated by the Democratic Party. The Republican Party was virtually nonexistent as a result of disenfranchisement among poor whites and African Americans, including voter intimidation against those who refused to vote Democratic. The state Republican Party led by Perry Wilbon Howard II — who resided in Washington D.C. after 1928 — was entirely drawn from the state's tiny black middle class and never contested non-presidential elections, serving entirely to sell federal patronage, mostly to white Democrats. The 1948 election split the National Democratic Party and segregationist Southern Democrats over the issue of civil rights for African Americans. In the 1952 election, Stevenson, a moderate on race issues, selected the segregationist Senator Sparkman as his running mate to avoid another split in the Democratic vote. However, this was not enough for some white Mississippians, who felt that the national Republican Party already offered a better prospect for their conservative social and economic goals.

== Campaign ==
Because the state Republican Party remained under black-and-tan control due to state politicians’ longstanding fear of competition with a lily-white GOP, national Republican candidates Dwight D. Eisenhower and Richard Nixon ran as “Independents for Eisenhower”. Both Howard's black-and-tans and the long-insurgent “lily-white” faction led by George L. Sheldon of Clinton agreed to withdraw their slates in favour of the Eisenhower Democrats in mid-October.

Eisenhower's electors ran as independents. His electors were Sam Lumpkin, Everette Truly, Earle Wingo, Hardy Lott, Joe Wroten, Earl Evans, W.L. Guice, and the wife of Robert Shands. Stevenson's electors were T.J. Tubb, Jim Blount, R.P. Sugg, Erst Long, Hilton Waits, William Harold Cox, J. L. Craft, and Boyce Holleman.

Despite Stevenson winning the state, Eisenhower won many Black Belt counties on the Mississippi River with large nonvoting African American populations. Eisenhower won five of the nine counties with black populations above 70%. This was due to white Republican voters rather than black voters, who were ineligible to vote.

=== Polls ===
| Source | Ranking | As of |
|---|---|---|
| The Columbus Ledger | Safe D (Flip) | September 8, 1952 |
| Lansing State Journal | Safe D (Flip) | September 17, 1952 |
| The Daily Herald | Likely D (Flip) | October 23, 1952 |
| The Salt Lake Tribune | Safe D (Flip) | October 24, 1952 |
| The Greeneville Sun | Certain D (Flip) | October 25, 1952 |
| The Modesto Bee | Safe D (Flip) | October 27, 1952 |
| Wichita Falls Times | Likely D (Flip) | October 29, 1952 |

== Results ==
1952 United States presidential election in Mississippi
| Party | Candidate | Votes | Percentage | Electoral votes |
|---|---|---|---|---|
| Democratic | Adlai Stevenson | 172,566 | 60.44% | 8 |
| Independent | Dwight D. Eisenhower | 112,966 | 39.56% | 0 |
| Totals | | 285,532 | 100.00% | 8 |

=== Results by county ===
| County | Adlai Stevenson Democratic | | Dwight D. Eisenhower Independent | | Margin | | Total votes cast |
| County | # | % | # | % | # | % | Total votes cast |
|---|---|---|---|---|---|---|---|
| Adams | 1,697 | 41.71% | 2,372 | 58.29% | -675 | -16.58% | 4,069 |
| Alcorn | 3,275 | 73.93% | 1,155 | 26.07% | 2,120 | 47.86% | 4,430 |
| Amite | 1,121 | 59.06% | 777 | 40.94% | 344 | 18.12% | 1,898 |
| Attala | 2,258 | 65.72% | 1,178 | 34.28% | 1,080 | 31.44% | 3,436 |
| Benton | 963 | 81.68% | 216 | 18.32% | 747 | 63.36% | 1,179 |
| Bolivar | 1,843 | 46.79% | 2,096 | 53.21% | -253 | -6.42% | 3,939 |
| Calhoun | 2,284 | 76.77% | 691 | 23.23% | 1,593 | 53.54% | 2,975 |
| Carroll | 1,168 | 68.58% | 535 | 31.42% | 633 | 37.16% | 1,703 |
| Chickasaw | 1,805 | 72.49% | 685 | 27.51% | 1,120 | 44.98% | 2,490 |
| Choctaw | 1,387 | 72.58% | 524 | 27.42% | 863 | 45.16% | 1,911 |
| Claiborne | 496 | 46.97% | 560 | 53.03% | -64 | -6.06% | 1,056 |
| Clarke | 2,000 | 72.62% | 754 | 27.38% | 1,246 | 45.24% | 2,754 |
| Clay | 1,230 | 53.32% | 1,077 | 46.68% | 153 | 6.64% | 2,307 |
| Coahoma | 2,115 | 56.64% | 1,619 | 43.36% | 496 | 13.28% | 3,734 |
| Copiah | 2,050 | 57.31% | 1,527 | 42.69% | 523 | 14.62% | 3,577 |
| Covington | 1,535 | 66.59% | 770 | 33.41% | 765 | 33.18% | 2,305 |
| DeSoto | 1,288 | 63.08% | 754 | 36.92% | 534 | 26.16% | 2,042 |
| Forrest | 2,936 | 39.59% | 4,480 | 60.41% | -1,544 | -20.82% | 7,416 |
| Franklin | 1,166 | 69.40% | 514 | 30.60% | 652 | 38.80% | 1,680 |
| George | 1,351 | 69.14% | 603 | 30.86% | 748 | 38.28% | 1,954 |
| Greene | 1,247 | 71.14% | 506 | 28.86% | 741 | 42.28% | 1,753 |
| Grenada | 1,174 | 54.00% | 1,000 | 46.00% | 174 | 8.00% | 2,174 |
| Hancock | 1,578 | 53.95% | 1,347 | 46.05% | 231 | 7.90% | 2,925 |
| Harrison | 7,181 | 54.65% | 5,960 | 45.35% | 1,221 | 9.30% | 13,141 |
| Hinds | 10,933 | 46.62% | 12,520 | 53.38% | -1,587 | -6.76% | 23,453 |
| Holmes | 1,423 | 52.16% | 1,305 | 47.84% | 118 | 4.32% | 2,728 |
| Humphreys | 858 | 59.30% | 589 | 40.70% | 269 | 18.60% | 1,447 |
| Issaquena | 170 | 57.24% | 127 | 42.76% | 43 | 14.48% | 297 |
| Itawamba | 2,236 | 80.09% | 556 | 19.91% | 1,680 | 60.18% | 2,792 |
| Jackson | 4,146 | 65.64% | 2,170 | 34.36% | 1,976 | 31.28% | 6,316 |
| Jasper | 1,872 | 73.70% | 668 | 26.30% | 1,204 | 47.40% | 2,540 |
| Jefferson | 539 | 46.91% | 610 | 53.09% | -71 | -6.18% | 1,149 |
| Jefferson Davis | 1,626 | 77.47% | 473 | 22.53% | 1,153 | 54.94% | 2,099 |
| Jones | 5,884 | 59.30% | 4,039 | 40.70% | 1,845 | 18.60% | 9,923 |
| Kemper | 1,593 | 81.07% | 372 | 18.93% | 1,221 | 62.14% | 1,965 |
| Lafayette | 2,363 | 73.14% | 868 | 26.86% | 1,495 | 46.28% | 3,231 |
| Lamar | 1,260 | 54.93% | 1,034 | 45.07% | 226 | 9.86% | 2,294 |
| Lauderdale | 5,841 | 58.54% | 4,137 | 41.46% | 1,704 | 17.08% | 9,978 |
| Lawrence | 1,117 | 66.77% | 556 | 33.23% | 561 | 33.54% | 1,673 |
| Leake | 2,667 | 81.56% | 603 | 18.44% | 2,064 | 63.12% | 3,270 |
| Lee | 4,174 | 67.58% | 2,002 | 32.42% | 2,172 | 35.16% | 6,176 |
| Leflore | 1,845 | 43.12% | 2,434 | 56.88% | -589 | -13.76% | 4,279 |
| Lincoln | 2,271 | 52.83% | 2,028 | 47.17% | 243 | 5.66% | 4,299 |
| Lowndes | 1,618 | 37.73% | 2,670 | 62.27% | -1,052 | -24.54% | 4,288 |
| Madison | 1,425 | 48.78% | 1,496 | 51.22% | -71 | -2.44% | 2,921 |
| Marion | 2,597 | 64.65% | 1,420 | 35.35% | 1,177 | 29.30% | 4,017 |
| Marshall | 1,847 | 75.36% | 604 | 24.64% | 1,243 | 50.72% | 2,451 |
| Monroe | 3,512 | 71.25% | 1,417 | 28.75% | 2,095 | 42.50% | 4,929 |
| Montgomery | 1,356 | 61.75% | 840 | 38.25% | 516 | 23.50% | 2,196 |
| Neshoba | 3,567 | 76.74% | 1,081 | 23.26% | 2,486 | 53.48% | 4,648 |
| Newton | 2,460 | 74.30% | 851 | 25.70% | 1,609 | 48.60% | 3,311 |
| Noxubee | 758 | 46.08% | 887 | 53.92% | -129 | -7.84% | 1,645 |
| Oktibbeha | 1,666 | 53.72% | 1,435 | 46.28% | 231 | 7.44% | 3,101 |
| Panola | 2,047 | 66.48% | 1,032 | 33.52% | 1,015 | 32.96% | 3,079 |
| Pearl River | 2,060 | 54.20% | 1,741 | 45.80% | 319 | 8.40% | 3,801 |
| Perry | 782 | 60.48% | 511 | 39.52% | 271 | 20.96% | 1,293 |
| Pike | 2,495 | 46.18% | 2,908 | 53.82% | -413 | -7.64% | 5,403 |
| Pontotoc | 2,281 | 77.88% | 648 | 22.12% | 1,633 | 55.76% | 2,929 |
| Prentiss | 2,672 | 78.52% | 731 | 21.48% | 1,941 | 57.04% | 3,403 |
| Quitman | 1,158 | 70.18% | 492 | 29.82% | 666 | 40.36% | 1,650 |
| Rankin | 2,077 | 57.34% | 1,545 | 42.66% | 532 | 14.68% | 3,622 |
| Scott | 2,208 | 66.29% | 1,123 | 33.71% | 1,085 | 32.58% | 3,331 |
| Sharkey | 388 | 39.27% | 600 | 60.73% | -212 | -21.46% | 988 |
| Simpson | 2,767 | 75.91% | 878 | 24.09% | 1,889 | 51.82% | 3,645 |
| Smith | 2,288 | 75.61% | 738 | 24.39% | 1,550 | 51.22% | 3,026 |
| Stone | 965 | 62.91% | 569 | 37.09% | 396 | 25.82% | 1,534 |
| Sunflower | 2,049 | 50.52% | 2,007 | 49.48% | 42 | 1.04% | 4,056 |
| Tallahatchie | 2,350 | 75.86% | 748 | 24.14% | 1,602 | 51.72% | 3,098 |
| Tate | 1,575 | 80.28% | 387 | 19.72% | 1,188 | 60.56% | 1,962 |
| Tippah | 2,878 | 84.92% | 511 | 15.08% | 2,367 | 69.84% | 3,389 |
| Tishomingo | 1,595 | 70.14% | 679 | 29.86% | 916 | 40.28% | 2,274 |
| Tunica | 530 | 58.05% | 383 | 41.95% | 147 | 16.10% | 913 |
| Union | 2,749 | 74.99% | 917 | 25.01% | 1,832 | 49.98% | 3,666 |
| Walthall | 1,357 | 73.43% | 491 | 26.57% | 866 | 46.86% | 1,848 |
| Warren | 2,366 | 40.63% | 3,458 | 59.38% | -1,092 | -18.75% | 5,824 |
| Washington | 2,618 | 44.23% | 3,301 | 55.77% | -683 | -11.54% | 5,919 |
| Wayne | 1,604 | 69.11% | 717 | 30.89% | 887 | 38.22% | 2,321 |
| Webster | 1,765 | 79.58% | 453 | 20.42% | 1,312 | 59.16% | 2,218 |
| Wilkinson | 563 | 44.61% | 699 | 55.39% | -136 | -10.78% | 1,262 |
| Winston | 2,559 | 76.85% | 771 | 23.15% | 1,788 | 53.70% | 3,330 |
| Yalobusha | 1,346 | 64.13% | 753 | 35.87% | 593 | 28.26% | 2,099 |
| Yazoo | 1,702 | 50.28% | 1,683 | 49.72% | 19 | 0.56% | 3,385 |
| Totals | 172,566 | 60.44% | 112,966 | 39.56% | 59,600 | 20.88% | 285,532 |

==== Counties that flipped from Dixiecrat to Democratic ====
- Carroll
- Coahoma
- Covington
- Choctaw
- Clarke
- Desoto
- Franklin
- Grenada
- George
- Greene
- Hancock
- Humphreys
- Harrison
- Jackson
- Jones
- Lamar
- Lauderdale
- Marshall
- Lawrence
- Lincoln
- Marion
- Neshoba
- Newton
- Oktibbeha
- Quitman
- Pearl River
- Perry
- Stone
- Tunica
- Wayne
- Webster
- Alcorn
- Amite
- Attala
- Benton
- Calhoun
- Chickasaw
- Clarke
- Clay
- Copiah
- Issaquena
- Itawamba
- Jasper
- Jefferson Davis
- Kemper
- Lafayette
- Leake
- Lee
- Madison
- Monroe
- Montgomery
- Panola
- Pontotoc
- Prentiss
- Rankin
- Scott
- Simpson
- Smith
- Sunflower
- Tallahatchie
- Tate
- Tippah
- Tishomingo
- Union
- Walthall
- Yalobusha
- Winston
- Coahoma
- Marshall
- Tunica
- Yazoo

==== Counties that flipped from Dixiecrat to Republican ====
- Adams
- Bolivar
- Claiborne
- Forrest
- Hinds
- Leflore
- Jefferson
- Lowndes
- Madison
- Noxubee
- Pike
- Sharkey
- Washington
- Warren
- Wilkinson

== Analysis ==
The Stevenson-Sparkman ticket carried Mississippi and its eight electoral votes with 60.44 percent of the popular vote, amounting to a total of 172,566 votes. These results, however, were the weakest for a state Democrat since the 1872 election when the state remained occupied by Union troops and Republican Ulysses S. Grant carried the state. It represented a large swing for the Republicans from 1948, when Thomas E. Dewey won only 2.62 percent of the vote.

Stevenson carried 67 of Mississippi's 82 counties, running up huge margins in the northeastern corner and rural areas of the state. Eisenhower, whose Mississippi electors were “Independent”, carried fifteen counties, the first time a national Republican had carried any since Herbert Hoover in 1928. His main base of support came from the western counties along the Mississippi River, which had a high concentration of nonvoting African Americans, including Hinds County, home to the state capital Jackson.

In contrast, the northeastern hills, which had given President Truman his highest proportion in 1948, along with the southeastern pineywoods both voted solidly for Stevenson, although not by the margins pre-1948 Democrats ran up throughout Mississippi. Whereas Delta whites had permanently estranged themselves from the Democratic Party over issues of economics and race, Hills and Pine Belt counties, much more economically populist although even more socially conservative, had not shared much in the Dixiecrat upheaval despite all giving majorities to “Democrat” Strom Thurmond in 1948. The divide between traditional Democrat Stevenson and the independent electors pledged to Eisenhower was closely related to the cleavage between “Delta” and “Hills” seen in Democratic white primaries during the first half of the twentieth century.

This election began to show signs of the impending collapse of Democratic dominance in Mississippi and the rest of the South. The vote share for the state Democratic candidate would decline in the next two subsequent elections, ultimately paving the way for Barry Goldwater’s victory in Mississippi and the Deep South in 1964.

== See also ==
- United States presidential elections in Mississippi

== Works cited ==
- Buchanan, William (1953). "Recent Trends in Mississippi Voting". The Social Science Bulletin. 6 (4). Johns Hopkins University Press: 2–6. JSTOR 45214742.
- McGillivray, Alice; Scammon, Richard, eds. (1994). America At The Polls 1920-1956: Harding to Eisenhower - A Handbook of American Presidential Election Statistics. Congressional Quarterly. ISBN 1568020589.
- Mississippi Official and Statistical Register: 1956-1960. Secretary of State of Mississippi. 1961.
