= Agnes Kane Callum =

American genealogist (1925–2015)

- Born: Agnes Emma Kane; February 24, 1925; Baltimore, Maryland, U.S.
- Died: July 22, 2015 (aged 90); Baltimore, Maryland, U.S.
- Education: Morgan State University; University of Ghana
- Occupation: Genealogist
- Spouse: Solomon Melvin Callum
- Children: 5

Agnes Kane Callum (February 24, 1925 – July 22, 2015) was a genealogist known for her research into Maryland's African-American history. She was a founding member of the Baltimore Afro-American Historical and Genealogical Society, a frequent columnist for The Catholic Review, and the founding editor of a black genealogical journal, Flower of the Forest. Callum was inducted into the Maryland Women's Hall of Fame in 2014.

== Early life and education ==
She was born in Baltimore, Maryland, in 1925, the fifth of 12 children of Phillip Moten Kane and Mary Gough Kane. Her paternal grandfather, Henry Kane, was born into slavery at Sotterley Plantation in St. Mary's County, Maryland.

After attending Baltimore public schools, she held a variety of jobs, including salesperson for a black-owned cosmetics company, Beauty Queen Co.; insurance agent for the North Carolina Mutual Life Insurance Company; licensed practical nurse at Rosewood Hospital; and night clerk for the United States Postal Service. She was active in her community, joining the Eastside Democratic Organization, founding a neighborhood club called "Clean Up for a Better Neighborhood," and organizing educational field trips for local schoolchildren.

At the age of 44, she resumed her education, earning a master's degree in social sciences at Morgan State University. In 1973, she received a Fulbright-Hays Scholarship and studied at the University of Ghana at Legon. Callum became interested in her family history while still an undergraduate, when she wrote a paper titled "The Acquisition of Land by Free Blacks in St. Mary's County Maryland" for a Black History class.

== Career ==
In 1979, she published her first book, Kane-Butler Genealogy: History of a Black Family. She went on to publish many volumes of research documenting the connections between the enslaved and slave holders in Maryland, and U.S. Colored Troops in Maryland. She also contributed many articles to the Catholic Review about the role of people of African descent, such as Mathias de Sousa, in colonial Maryland.

In 1982, she gave a presentation titled The Genealogy of a Slave Family of St. Mary's County, Maryland 1793–1900 at the annual conference of the Association for the Study of African American Life and History (ASALH). That same year, she founded a black genealogical journal, Flower of the Forest, named for a tract of land in St. Mary's County, Maryland, that had been owned by the Butler family for 125 years. Callum edited and published the journal for 25 years. She was still publishing online as late as 2014.

She was a member of the Board of Trustees of the Sotterley Plantation, a founding member of the Baltimore chapter of the Afro-American Historical and Genealogical Society, and a founding member of the Commission to Coordinate the Study, Commemoration and Impact of Slavery's History and Legacy in Maryland.

Callum's research has helped many people trace their ancestors who were enslaved in Maryland. She documented the history of St. Francis Xavier Church in East Baltimore, the first Catholic parish officially established for African Americans. Her research into slave life at the Sotterley Plantation provided the basis for the educational program "Slavery to Freedom," at Sotterley.

== Personal life ==
Her husband, Solomon Melvin Callum, died in 1975. She had five children, two of whom predeceased her.

== Death and memorials ==
She died in Baltimore on July 22, 2015, of complications from Parkinson's disease.

In 2006, a complete set of her published works was donated to the Reginald F. Lewis Museum of Maryland African American History & Culture in Baltimore. In 2007, the Baltimore chapter of the Afro-American Historical and Genealogical Society was renamed the Agnes Kane Callum chapter in her honor. She received an honorary degree in history from St. Mary's College of Maryland in 2008. In 2017, the Slave Cabin Exhibition at Sotterley Plantation was dedicated to her memory.

== Books ==
- Kane-Butler Genealogy: History of a Black Family. Callum. 1979. OCLC 5446165.
- Colored Volunteers of Maryland, Civil War, 7th Regiment, United States Colored Troops, 1863-1866. Baltimore: Mullac. 1990. OCLC 21815242.
- Slave Statistics of Saint Mary's County, Maryland, 1864: Commissioner George B. Dent. Baltimore: Mullac. 1993. OCLC 28946780.
- Black Marriages of Anne Arundel County, Maryland, 1851 to 1886. Baltimore: Mullac. 1994. OCLC 41248163.
- Colored Volunteers of Maryland: Bounty Records of 9th Regiment, United States Colored Troops, 1863–1866. Baltimore: Mullac. 1998. OCLC 43620215.
- 9th Regiment United States Colored Troops, Volunteers of Maryland, Civil War, 1863–1866. Baltimore: Mullac Publishers. 1999. OCLC 43325071.
- Societies, clubs, lodges, savings, unions and churches of the Register of signatures of depositors in the branches of the Freedmans and Trust [i.e. Freedman's Savings and Trust] Company, 1865–1874: Baltimore, Maryland. Baltimore: Mullac. 2005. OCLC 61932057.

== See also ==
- History of slavery in Maryland
- Eleanor Butler
