= God the Original Segregationist =

1954 sermon by Carey Daniel

God the Original Segregationist was a 1954 sermon in defense of racial segregation in the United States by the Rev. Carey Daniel, pastor of First Baptist Church of West Dallas, Texas. Daniel wrote the sermon in response to the U.S. Supreme Court decision in Brown v. Board of Education, which ruled that racial segregation in public schools was unconstitutional.

The sermon was first published as a pamphlet in 1955, and then later as a collected book of sermons. It was influential with the Christian right in pro-segregation Southern states, who viewed racial integration as a threat to white supremacy and the system of Jim Crow laws which held it in place. These laws were slowly dismantled by the legislative achievements of the civil rights movement in the 1960s.

== Background ==
The curse of Ham was used by some Christians as a biblical justification for imposing slavery and racial discrimination on black people, although this concept has been criticized for being an ideologically driven misconception. Regarding this matter, the Christian leader Martin Luther King Jr. called such an attempt a "blasphemy" that "is against everything that the Christian religion stands for."

For Southern slave owners who were faced with the abolitionist movement to end slavery, the curse of Ham was one of the many grounds upon which Christian planters could formulate an ideological defense of slavery. Even before slavery, in order to promote economic motivations within Europe associated with colonialism, the curse of Ham was used to shift the common Aristotelian belief that phenotypic differentiation among humans was a result of climatic difference, to a racialist perspective that phenotypic differentiation within the species was due to there being different racial types.

The split between the Northern and Southern Baptist organizations arose over doctrinal issues pertaining to slavery and the education of slaves. At the time of the split, the Southern Baptist group used the curse of Cain as a justification for slavery. Some 19th- and 20th-century Baptist ministers in the Southern United States taught the belief that there were two separate heavens; one for blacks, and one for whites. Southern Baptists have either taught or practiced various forms of racial segregation well into the mid-20th century, though members of all races were accepted at worship services.

== Sermon ==
On Monday, May 17, 1954, the U.S. Supreme Court ruled that racial segregation in public schools was unconstitutional in the Brown v. Board of Education decision. Rev. Carey Daniel, a proponent of segregation and pastor of First Baptist Church of West Dallas, Texas, wrote a response to the decision and delivered it as a sermon on Sunday, May 23, 1954.

== Publication ==
Daniel later published the sermon as a small pamphlet in 1955. It found currency among some conservative white Christians in Southern states who were opposed to racial integration. In a sign of its popularity, the most prominent newspaper in Dallas, the Dallas Morning News, published an abridged version of Daniel's pamphlet on August 13, 1955.

The pamphlet was distributed by Citizens' Councils, a network of white supremacist, segregationist organizations in the Southern United States. Daniel was vice-chairman of the Dallas chapter of the Texas Citizens Council. Over a ten-year period, the pamphlet sold over a million copies. The pamphlet was later published in a collection of sermons.

== Legacy ==
Daniel’s segregationist theology was popular and influential in the political and religious community of Southern states. Just five months after Daniel delivered his sermon, Rev. Guy T. Gillespie, the retiring president of Belhaven University, gave a speech in November 1954 to the Synod of Mississippi of the Presbyterian Church. The address, titled "A Christian View on Segregation", made the same arguments as Daniel and was also highly influential. Five years later, Ross Barnett successfully campaigned on the idea of the biblical God as the original segregationist in the 1959 Mississippi gubernatorial election.

In a 1960 Easter radio address, evangelist Bob Jones Sr., the founder of Bob Jones University (BJU) in South Carolina, declared that God had been the author of segregation and that opposition to segregation was opposition to God. It would take an additional forty years for BJU to finally abandon their racial discrimination policies against students, while spending the four intervening decades continuing to use the Bible to defend segregation up until the year 2000.

In 1995, approximately 130 years after slavery had ended in the United States, the Southern Baptist Convention officially denounced racism and apologized for its past defense of slavery.

== See also ==
- Civil rights movement (1896–1954)
- Anti-communism
- W. A. Criswell
- Criticism of religion
