= Karl Wiesenburg =

American politician

Otto Karl Wiesenburg

Personal details
- Born: August 1, 1911 Rosedale, New York, U.S.
- Died: June 18, 1990 (aged 78) Pascagoula, Mississippi, U.S.
- Resting place: Krebs Cemetery; Pascagoula, Mississippi
- Party: Democratic
- Spouse: Denise Higginbotham
- Children: Otto Karl Jr. (1946–2006); Denis Alan (b. 1948); Martha Ann (b. 1951); Anirah Denise (b. 1952)

Otto Karl Wiesenburg (August 1, 1911 – June 18, 1990) was an American legislator, lawyer, and public servant. He was a member of the Mississippi House of Representatives from 1956 to 1964 and held various other roles in public service for Pascagoula and Jackson County, Mississippi. Wiesenburg is best known for his opposition to Mississippi Governor Ross Barnett's attempt to deny the enrollment of James Meredith into the University of Mississippi.

== Early life and military service ==
Wiesenburg was born in Rosedale, New York on August 1, 1911 to Adolph Otto Johann and Martha Mary (Horvath) Wiesenburg. At the age of five, he moved with his parents to 205 East 66th Street on the Upper East Side of Manhattan. He attended Public School 74 and was later admitted to Townsend Harris Hall, before dropping out at the age of 16, following the death of his father, to support his mother.

Wiesenburg served in the Coast Guard from December 3, 1929 to December 2, 1934 advancing from apprentice seaman to Radioman 2nd Class. He arrived in Pascagoula, Mississippi in 1931 as a radio operator on a Coast Guard vessel.

While he did not complete high school before leaving New York to join the Coast Guard, he was self-educated and studied law during his days at sea in the Coast Guard. In 1933, he passed The Mississippi Bar examination, was admitted to the Mississippi Bar on March 27, 1933 and practiced law in Pascagoula until the day of his death on June 18, 1990. His law practice was one of the most respected in the state and he was described as a man of integrity by The Mississippi Press.

Although he had met his military obligation with five year's service in the Coast Guard, Wiesenburg joined the United States Army on May 2, 1942 and served overseas for 42 months during World War II as a radio operator in India, Burma, and China, rising to the rank of captain. He was awarded the Bronze Star Medal and the Asiatic–Pacific Campaign Medal with two combat stars. After the war, he continued his military service in the United States Army Reserve as commanding officer of the 845th Signal Service Battalion before retiring as a lieutenant colonel in 1964.

== Public service ==
Devoted to public service, Wiesenburg was appointed to the Pascagoula Port Commission in 1941 and served as its president. He served as city attorney to both Pascagoula and Ocean Springs and as attorney for the Pascagoula Port Authority and attorney for the Jackson County Board of Supervisors. He also served for one term on the Pascagoula City Council. In 1956, he was elected to the Mississippi Legislature where served until 1964. He was voted the Outstanding Freshman Legislator in 1956. During his eight years, he authored significant legislation for south Mississippi including the County Zoning Act, State Ports Act, Water Safety and Boating Act, Pat Harrison Waterway Commission Act, and the Jackson County Campus - Mississippi Gulf Coast Jr. College Act. He also authored the landmark Jackson County Port Authority Act that created the port of Pascagoula, including the industrial area of Bayou Casotte. The Jackson County Port Authority considers him the father of the Port of Pascagoula.

== Meredith incident ==
During the period when James Meredith entered the University of Mississippi as its first black student, over the opposition of Governor Ross Barnett and the Mississippi Legislature, Wiesenburg was one of two legislators, the other being Joe Wroten of Greenville, who took a strong stand for civil rights and observance of the law. Wiesenburg stated of the Barnett administration that, "His administration will go down as the worst since Reconstruction days." He wrote a five-part series of articles titled "The Oxford Disaster...Price of Defiance" that was published in the Pascagoula newspaper The Chronicle between December 17 and December 21, 1962. The articles detailed the applicable federal and state laws that had been violated and stated that the Governor's action had followed "the road to riot" and that the resulting bloodshed in Oxford was the "price of defiance." Ira B. Harkey Jr. editor of The Chronicle won the Pulitzer Prize for Editorial Writing in 1963 for his anti-segregationist editorials and reporting of the James Meredith incident. Others also took notice of Wiesenburg's strong stand for the rule of law. Attorney General Robert F. Kennedy wrote of Wiesenburg in a letter to the federal attorney in Oxford, "Tell [Wiesenburg] for me that he is the one who deserves a Pulitzer Prize or more. It is all well for we in the North to talk about these matters. That takes no courage at all. But people such as you and Mr. Wiesenburg are the ones who really carry the banner." Former Mississippi Governor William Winter described Wiesenburg as "one of the most courageous men he ever knew."

While he did not attend college, unknown to his family until after his death, he paid for many students to attend colleges throughout the state. His family has established the Karl Wiesenburg Scholarship at the University of Southern Mississippi to honor his commitment to education and public service. The scholarship is available to University of Southern Mississippi students majoring in political science with preference for a student from Jackson County.

== Death ==
Wiesenburg died on June 18, 1990, from cardiac arrest, at Singing River Hospital in Pascagoula.
