= 1959 Mississippi gubernatorial election =

1959 Mississippi Democratic gubernatorial primary runoff
- August 25, 1959
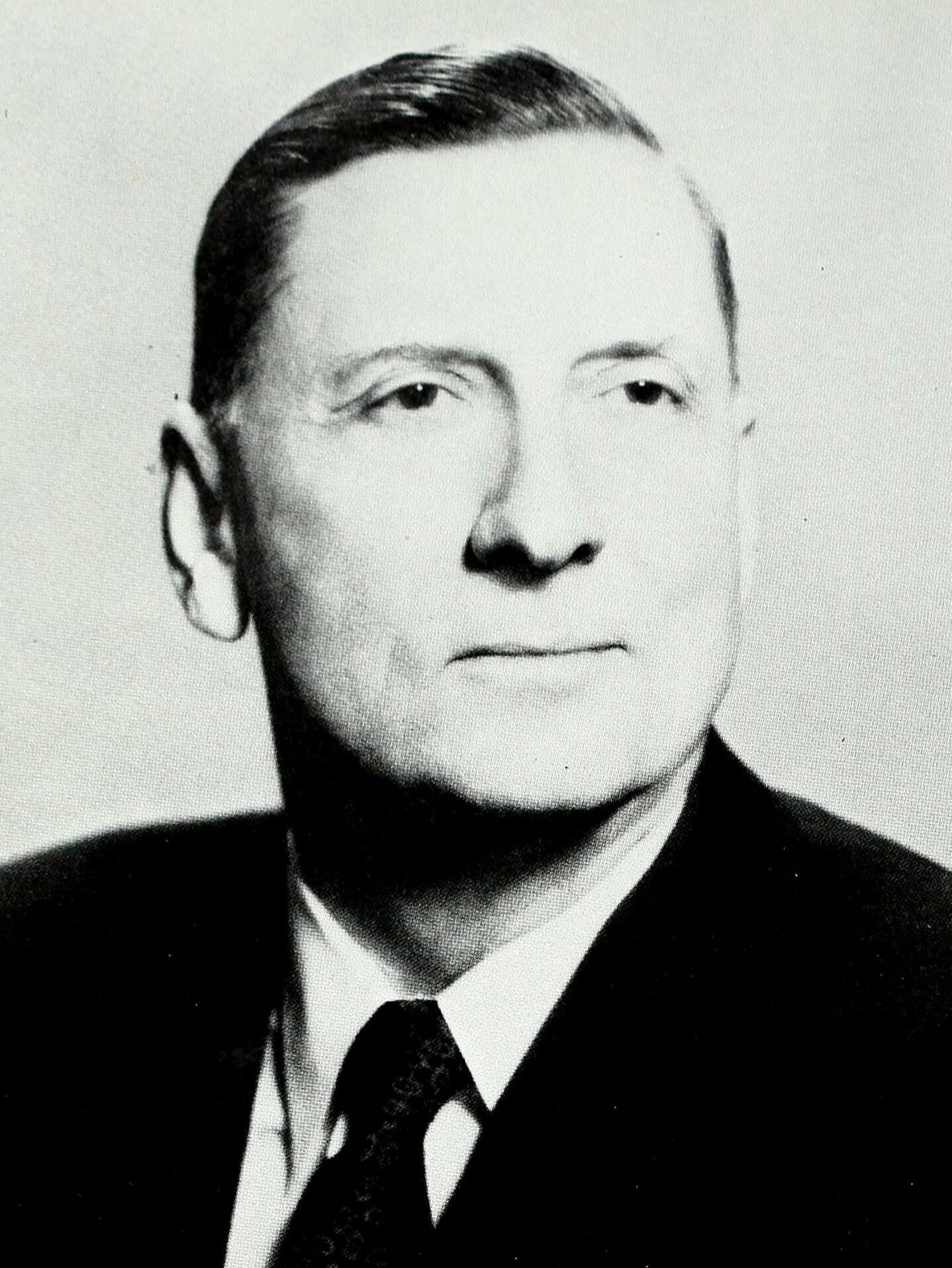

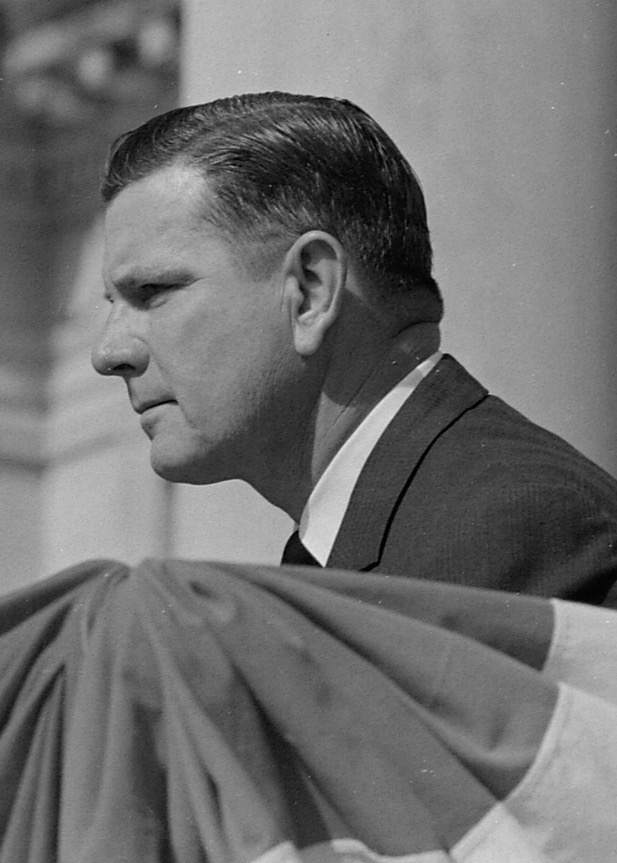
Nominee	Ross Barnett	Carroll Gartin
Party	Democratic	Democratic
Popular vote	230,557	193,706
Percentage	54.34%	45.66%
- County results Barnett: 50–60% 60–70% 70–80% 80–90% Gartin: 50–60% 60–70% 70–80%
Governor before election
James P. Coleman
Democratic
Elected Governor
Ross Barnett
Democratic

The 1959 Mississippi gubernatorial election took place on November 3, 1959, in order to elect the Governor of Mississippi. Incumbent Democrat James P. Coleman was term-limited, and could not run for reelection to a second term. As was common at the time, the Democratic candidate ran unopposed in the general election; therefore, the Democratic primary was the real contest, and winning the primary was considered tantamount to election.

== Democratic primary ==
After the Brown v. Board of Education ruling in 1954 against school segregation and the 1957 Little Rock Crisis, the defense of segregation and white supremacy across the South became a paramount concern, and all candidates ran as segregationists.

Ross Barnett, who previously ran in 1951 and 1955, had the support of the Citizens' Councils and former Theodore G. Bilbo partisans, as well as the covert help of Senator James Eastland. Barnett described himself as a "vigorous segregationist."

Carroll Gartin, the incumbent lieutenant governor, ran on a platform of continuity with Coleman's term as governor.

Charles L. Sullivan, an attorney, was relatively more moderate on the race subject; he also ran on a promise to end the state's Prohibition law. He also received covert help from Eastland, who wanted to hamstring Gartin.

Robert Mason was a perennial candidate who ran on a white supremacy platform, promising to have money printed to fund the state's budget: "They’re turning out the money on those free presses. And that’s good. Let’em keep turning some of that free press money to Mississippi." He also opposed the end of Prohibition in Mississippi. He said he saved money so that, every two or three years, he could either travel or run for governor, adding that he did so on the suggestion of his wife.

Because no candidate received a majority in the Democratic primary, by state law, a runoff was held between the top two candidates. The runoff election was won by Barnett, who defeated Gartin; both ran as rabid segregationists, to the dismay of the relatively more moderate incumbent Coleman. Each candidate tried to tar the other side with association with pro-integration forces.

=== Results ===
Mississippi Democratic gubernatorial primary, 1959
Party	Candidate	Votes	%
Democratic	Ross Barnett	155,508	35.26
Democratic	Carroll Gartin	151,043	34.25
Democratic	Charles L. Sullivan	131,792	29.88
Democratic	Robert F. Mason	2,704	0.61
Total votes		441,047	100.00

=== Runoff ===
Mississippi Democratic gubernatorial primary runoff, 1959
Party	Candidate	Votes	%
Democratic	Ross Barnett	230,557	54.34
Democratic	Carroll Gartin	193,706	45.66
Total votes		424,263	100.00

== General election ==
In the general election, Barnett ran unopposed.

=== Results ===
Mississippi gubernatorial election, 1959
Party	Candidate	Votes	%
Democratic	Ross Barnett	57,671	100.00
Total votes		57,671	100.00
Democratic hold			
