= Anti-miscegenation cases in the American West =

19th-century American intermarriage laws

Anti-miscegenation cases in the American West were legal cases in which the government attempted to interfere with marriages between people of different racial, ethnic, or political backgrounds in the American West.

During the fur trade of the 18th and early 19th century, White European trappers and traders often married into Indigenous nations. Even as the fur trade declined in the 19th century and American policy discouraged intermarriage, European American men continued to marry Native American women, and American West territories and states passed a series of contradictory laws to govern these unions. Indigenous women identified with multiple nationalities as political boundaries shifted and blurred the lines among tribal, territorial, state, and national statuses and identities. American policy also discouraged intermarriage between European American men and Asian American women. Anti-miscegenation laws emerged when inheritance was questioned in probate cases.

== Marriages between Native women and non-Native men ==
As territories and states published their legal codes, legislators added the term “Indian” or “Native American” to anti-miscegenation laws in the 19th century American West. These included legislation in the territories and states of Washington (1855, amended in 1866 and repealed in 1868), Nevada (1861 and repealed in 1959), Idaho (1864), Arizona (1865 and repealed in 1962), Oregon (1862, amended in 1866 and repealed in 1951), and Wyoming (1869 and repealed 1882).

Anti-miscegenation laws led to the acquisition of Native land and protection of property held by European Americans. Marriage “facilitated the passage of land from Indians to Whites.” “But when the partners to an ‘Indian custom’ marriage were a White man and an Indian woman, recognizing the marriage slowly but surely brought couples under the jurisdiction of American state laws, which vested the right to economic authority and land ownership in husbands and channeled property and inheritance along familial lines.” In the late nineteenth century, legal decisions confirmed “…the land and property rights of White husbands.” The Donation Land Claim Act of 1850, meant to allow married couples to claim an additional spousal claim, became law five years before US Government treaties with indigenous nations ceding land that was later opened to settlement. In practice, the law “…confirmed titles to land held in the names of Indian women married to White men.” The Missouri Supreme Court affirmed this practice in 1860. The cases “…protected White husbands’ property rights by bringing Indian women and mixed-race children within the circle of familial inheritance rights."

The attitudes of early twentieth century European American men played a role in legal decisions and included: associating interracial relationships with prostitution, hypersexualizing Native women, viewing Whiteness as property to be protected, and reasoning from a legal standpoint that women were economically dependent on men.

== Anti-miscegenation cases ==
=== In Re Estate of Peter Jewell (1876) ===
Nora Jewell struggled to retain her inheritance as a child with a non-Native father and a Native mother. Despite being clouded by anti-miscegenation laws, on San Juan Island in Puget Sound in 1876, ten-year-old Métis Nora Jewell became the sole legitimate heir to the estate of her Danish American father, Peter Jewell, and her Lummi Coast Salish mother, Fanny Jewell. Washington Territory probate judge Henry Tenschau made Port Townsend businessman Israel Katz executor of the will and made widower T.W. Boggess the guardian of Nora. In 1877, Katz turned over her inheritance and guardianship to James F. Smith. Under Smith, Nora endured “…domestic, field, and sexual servitude.” In 1880, prosecuted by district attorney Irving Ballard and presided over by third Washington territorial district judge Roger Sherman Greene (the same judge who presided over the Whatcom County Nine that same year) a jury acquitted James F. Smith for raping fourteen-year-old Nora Jewell, possibly swayed by the defense linking mixed-race fatherless girls with promiscuity. Upon reaching the age of majority in 1882, Nora Jewell “…inherited unimpinged rights to the estate of her father.” In 1886, Nora Jewell sold the property, today known as Fir Oak Farm in Friday Harbor.

=== Meister v. Moore ===
In Meister_v._Moore (1877), the Supreme Court of the United States confirmed common law marriage between non-Native men and Native women. Coupled non-Native men and Native women cases were “…designed to reinforce white supremacy by protecting white property” and “served as entering wedges for the expansion of local jurisdictions.” By the 1890s when control of land seemed certain, courts then enforced anti-miscegenation laws. Property relationship was then structured by anti-miscegenation law.

=== Estate of Walker ===
Juana Walker won and later lost her inheritance as the only child with a non-Native father and a Native mother. In Florence, Arizona, in 1893, a Pinal County probate court ruled in favor of the inheritance claim filed by eighteen-year-old Juana Walker for the estate of her American father, retired 158th Infantry Regiment Captain John D. Walker, and her Akimel O'odham mother Churga. A district court and the Arizona Supreme Court both overturned the decision on the appeal filed by her European American uncles.

=== Graham v. Matthias ===
This 1894 case is the only known successful inheritance trial involving the daughter of a non-Native father and a Native mother. Rebecca Lena Graham was the daughter of American father Frank Matthias and Duwamish mother Peggy. Although her father did not leave a will, US district judge for the state of Washington Cornelius H. Hanford decided in favor of the estate claim made by Rebecca Lena Graham.
