= Joe Wroten =

American lawyer and politician

Member of the Mississippi House of Representatives
- In office 1952–1963

Personal details
- Born: February 28, 1925 New Albany, Mississippi
- Died: March 17, 2005 (aged 80) Tupelo, Mississippi
- Party: Democratic
- Occupation: Lawyer, judge

Joseph Eason Wroten (February 28, 1925 – March 17, 2005) was an American lawyer and politician in the state of Mississippi. He represented Greenville and Washington County in the Mississippi House of Representatives from 1952 to 1963. A progressive Democrat for that time and place, he was "an almost lone dissenter in the state's 'massive resistance' policies" in its fight against racial integration.

In the 1950s Wroten consistently spoke and voted against the Mississippi legislature's maneuvers to divert state monies to the Citizens' Councils. Out of 122 representatives, only he and Karl Wiesenburg of Pascagoula voted nay in Governor Ross Barnett's special session called to stop James Meredith from enrolling at the University of Mississippi, which saw the Ole Miss riot of 1962. He was defeated in his bid for re-election the next year. He went on to be elected chairman of the Washington County Democratic Executive Committee, a racially integrated political committee which announced its pro-integration platform at the 1968 Mississippi State Democratic convention. At this time Wroten's party affiliation was Loyalist Democrat. He and a delegation of the executive committee went to the National Democratic Convention in Chicago,

and in a credentials fight we succeeded in prevailing over the old guard conservative delegation composed of the governor and others from Mississippi, and we were the ones who were seated. It was a racially inclusive delegation from Mississippi that was seated at Chicago in 1968. I was a member of that group.

As a youth, Wroten earned the Eagle Scout award. In 1942 while a pre-med student at Millsaps College he joined the U.S. Naval Reserve and served as a navigation, gunnery and communication officer and as lay chaplain, where he integrated the worship service, then was a Naval officer through 1946. While overseas in the Navy he decided to become an attorney, and graduated from law school at Ole Miss in 1948. In both colleges he was president of the Kappa Sigma fraternity. In the 1970s he worked as a judge in the Washington County courts. From 1984 until his death in 2005, he was Clerk of Court of the U.S. Bankruptcy Court, Northern District of Mississippi in Aberdeen. He taught Sunday School in the United Methodist Church for 60 years. Wroten died at the age of 80 on March 17, 2005.

== Biography ==
- Katagiri, Yasuhiro (2007). The Mississippi State Sovereignty Commission: Civil Rights and States' Rights. University Press of Mississippi. ISBN 978-1-60473-008-1.
- Sainsbury, Jeff (March 31, 1992). "Interview with Joseph E. Wroten" (PDF). John C. Stennis Oral History Project. Mississippi State University.
- Sargent, Frederic O. (2004). The Civil Rights Revolution: Events and Leaders, 1955–1968. McFarland. ISBN 978-0-7864-8422-5.
