= Ross Barnett =

53rd Governor of Mississippi

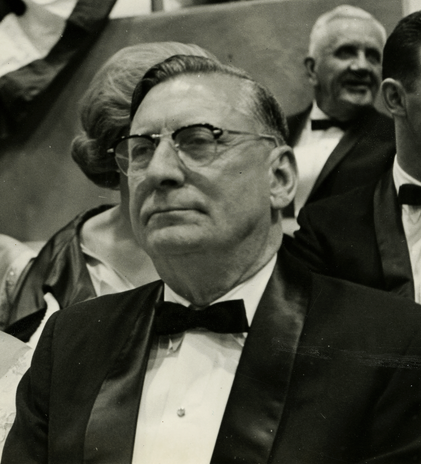
- Barnett in 1964

53rd Governor of Mississippi
- In office January 19, 1960 – January 21, 1964
- Lieutenant: Paul B. Johnson Jr.
- Preceded by: James P. Coleman
- Succeeded by: Paul B. Johnson Jr.

Personal details
- Born: Ross Robert Barnett; January 22, 1898 Standing Pine, Mississippi, U.S.
- Died: November 6, 1987 (aged 89) Jackson, Mississippi, U.S.
- Party: Democratic
- Spouse: Mary Pearl Crawford (m. 1929)
- Children: 3
- Education: Mississippi College (AB); University of Mississippi (LLB)

Military service
- Allegiance: United States
- Branch/service: United States Army
- Battles/wars: World War I

Ross Robert Barnett (January 22, 1898 – November 6, 1987) was an American politician who served as the 53rd governor of Mississippi from 1960 to 1964. He was a Southern Democrat who supported racial segregation.

== Early life ==
=== Background and learning ===
Born in Standing Pine in Leake County, Mississippi, Barnett was the youngest of ten children of John William Barnett, a Confederate veteran, and Virginia Ann Chadwick.

He served in the United States Army during World War I, then worked in jobs while earning an undergraduate degree from Mississippi College in Clinton in 1922. Four years later, he followed that with an LL.B. from the University of Mississippi (commonly known as "Ole Miss") in Oxford, where he gave courses to freshmen.

In order to save money, he worked as schoolhouse janitor, barber, brass band organizer, and door-to-door salesman for WearEver aluminum products.

=== Legal career ===
His first legal case was, while he was still at Ole Miss, over a replevin case about a cow, which he won and for which he received a $2.50 fee; his first real case as a lawyer was about representing a black woman suing her ex-husband over the value of a sidesaddle, losing this case in the justice court but winning it in the county court, earning himself $7.50.

After trying and failing to join an existing law firm, he rented space near Charles Crisler's office, and soon founded his own law firm; over the next quarter century, Barnett became one of the state's most successful trial lawyers, earning more than $100,000 a year with specialty in damage suits against corporations. Most of his clients were poor whites and blacks, and tales were told about an elderly black man being injured in a traffic accident and asking for "Doctor Ross Barnett" when asked which doctor to call.

Ole Miss Law School Dean Robert Farley described him as such: "He was not a brilliant lawyer, he was a brilliant jury manipulator, but I don't think anybody ever accused Ross of knowing much law".

He often donated his skills to causes and served as president of the Mississippi Bar Association for two years beginning in 1943.

=== Personal life ===
In 1929, he married Mary Pearl Crawford, a school teacher; the couple had two daughters and a son.

== Political life ==
=== First steps ===
Using the income derived from his legal fees, Barnett sought to enter politics, unsuccessfully running twice in the Democratic primary for Governor of Mississippi, in 1951 and 1955. At the time, Mississippi was a one-party state dominated by the Democrats, and the Democratic primary was the only meaningful contest.

On his third try in 1959, he won the nomination, in a campaign which mostly ran on segregation, publishing the brochure "Dynamic Leadership – To Keep Segregation and Improve Our Standard of Living" and making statements such as "The Negro is different because God made him different to punish him. His forehead slants back. His nose is different. His lips are different, and his color is sure different." His song "Roll with Ross", whose tune was later used for the state anthem "Go, Mississippi", contained the following:

Roll with Ross, roll with Ross, he's his own boss
For segregation, one hundred percent
He's not a moderate like some of the gents
He'll fight integration with forceful intent.

No Republican even filed, and Barnett was unopposed in the November general election. His inauguration was on January 19, 1960. During his term in office, he celebrated the centennial of the American Civil War. Barnett traveled to Civil War sites to pay homage to fallen "sons of Mississippi".

In 1960, Barnett ran in the Democratic Party presidential primaries as a favorite son candidate. He ran to protest leading candidate John Kennedy's support of the civil rights movement, but lost. Following this, Barnett attempted to establish a third-party movement akin to the Dixiecrat movement of 1948. He aimed to counter the civil rights plank adopted by the Democratic National Convention in 1960, which he found repulsive. However, his efforts to garner support from fellow southern governors failed. Consequently, Barnett proposed a group of uncommitted Democratic electors, who triumphed over the Mississippi slate committed to endorsing Kennedy in the November elections. Ultimately, these electors allocated the state's eight electoral votes to Senator Harry F. Byrd.

=== Governorship ===
During his first months as governor, the state legislature saw the introduction of 24 new bills advocating segregation, and directives were issued to circuit clerks, instructing them to withhold voter registration data from the Justice Department. In his capacity as the chairman of the State Sovereignty Commission, Barnett financially supported the Mississippi Association of Citizens Councils, granting them more than $100,000 in state grants 1962. Barnett, a staunch segregationist, became known for his tumultuous clashes with the civil rights movement which dominated his term.

Barnett arranged for the arrest of Freedom Riders in 1961 and then imprisoned them at Parchman Farm. While their offenses were minor, the Freedom Riders were strip-searched, had beds taken away, and were humiliated and brutalized in the prison. Barnett reportedly told the guards to "break their spirits, not their bones".

While this approach gained approval in the state, it was done in part to blunt the criticism that he was receiving for multiple reasons: failing to follow through with promises of jobs for office-seekers; filling those jobs with acquaintances, and attempting to wrest control of state agencies from the legislature. Barnett was a member of the white supremacist Citizens' Councils movement.

In 1962, the state agency in charge of universities and colleges, the Institutions of Higher Learning, appointed Barnett the registrar in order to oppose James Meredith's efforts to desegregate Barnett's alma mater, the University of Mississippi. With the accreditation of the state's medical school and other universities in jeopardy due to the political interventions, the IHL board reversed their action after the riots on the campus. Barnett was fined $10,000 and sentenced to jail for contempt but never paid the fine or served a day in jail. This was because the charges were terminated (civil) and dismissed (criminal) by the 5th Circuit Court of Appeals because of "substantial compliance with orders of the court," and "in view of changed circumstances and conditions." Only two Mississippi legislators opposed Barnett's efforts to defy the federal authorities, Joe Wroten and Karl Wiesenburg. On September 13, he said that "There is no case in history where the Caucasian race has survived social integration. We will not drink from the cup of genocide."

On the night before the Ole Miss riot of 1962 protesting Meredith's entry to the university, Barnett gave his sixteen-word "I Love Mississippi" speech at the University of Mississippi football game in Jackson. The Ole Miss Rebels were playing the Kentucky Wildcats. 41,000 fans cheered at the stadium waving thousands of Confederate flags. At halftime, a gigantic Confederate flag was unveiled on the field. The crowd shouted "We want Ross!". Barnett went to the field, grabbed the microphone at the 50-yard line and said to an enthusiastic crowd:

I love Mississippi! I love her people! Our customs. I love and I respect our heritage.

Many Mississippians linked segregation to the Bible. Barnett, a Baptist Sunday school teacher, declared "The Good Lord was the original segregationist. He put the black man in Africa. ... He made us white because he wanted us white, and he intended that we should stay that way." Barnett said that Mississippi had the largest percent of black Americans because "they love our way of life here, and that way is segregation."

In 1963, Barnett tried to prevent the men's basketball team of Mississippi State University from playing an NCAA Tournament game against the racially integrated team from Loyola of Chicago. The team defied Barnett by sneaking out of the state and playing the game, which they lost to the eventual national champions.

=== After his term ===
==== Challenge from Republicans ====
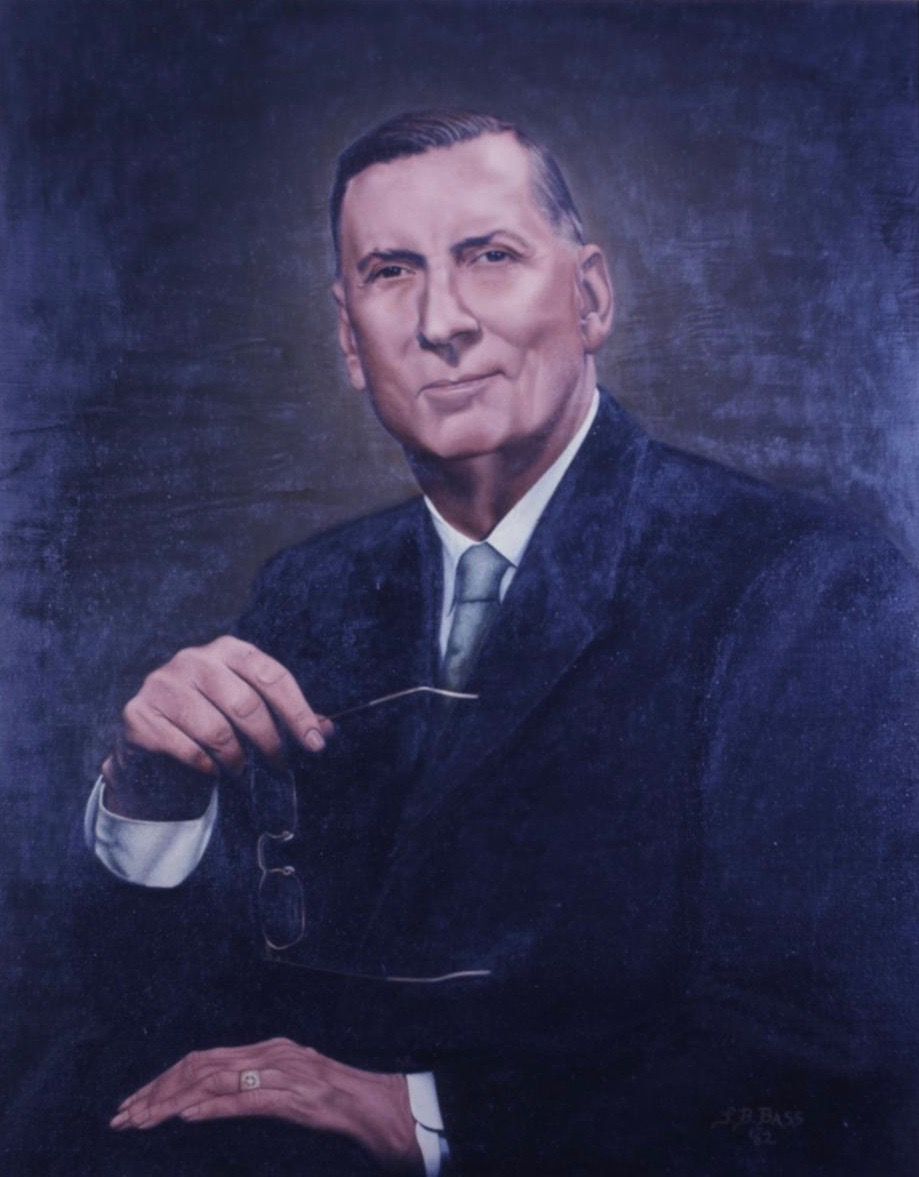
Portrait of Barnett

Barnett's term as governor officially expired on January 21, 1964, with the swearing-in of his successor, the outgoing lieutenant governor, Paul B. Johnson. Barnett was known for his strong opposition to the development of the two-party system in the former Democratic stronghold of Mississippi. Along with state Democratic chairman Bidwell Adam, Barnett campaigned strongly for his state Democratic ticket, including Paul Johnson for governor to succeed Barnett and Carroll Gartin for lieutenant governor, the man that Barnett had defeated for governor four years earlier.

Johnson and Gartin faced the challenge of the Republicans Rubel Phillips and Stanford Morse, the first Republican ticket for governor and lieutenant governor to run in Mississippi in decades. Barnett urged his state's Democratic voters to "push out this Republican threat" and added that he was "fed up with these fence-riding, pussy-footing, snow-digging Yankee Republicans", a reference to northern transplants coming into Mississippi.

Barnett was expected by some to run in the 1964 Democratic presidential primaries as a segregationist candidate against incumbent U.S. President Lyndon B. Johnson, but he did not. Governor George C. Wallace of Alabama subsequently assumed this role in part, not running openly against Johnson but rather testing his popularity in Wisconsin, Indiana, and Maryland. Barnett opposed Johnson, whom he called a "counterfeit confederate...who [might] someday resign from the white race" during a "Patriot's Rally Against Tyranny" on 4 July 1964, and supported Barry Goldwater due to his vote against the Civil Rights Act of 1964.

Shortly after he left office, Barnett's looming presence was evident at the first jury trial of white supremacist Byron De La Beckwith in February 1964. De La Beckwith was on trial for the murder of African American civil rights activist Medgar Evers, but an all-white jury was unable to agree on a verdict in both this and a subsequent re-trial. In the second subsequent re-trial, former Governor Ross Barnett interrupted the proceedings, while Myrlie Evers was testifying, to shake hands with Beckwith. De La Beckwith was eventually convicted at a subsequent trial three decades later, a case chronicled in the movie Ghosts of Mississippi.

==== Ole Miss controversy with Robert F. Kennedy ====
On March 18, 1966, former United States Attorney General Robert F. Kennedy, who frequently conversed by telephone with Barnett during the Meredith crisis in attempts to peacefully secure Meredith's enrollment at Ole Miss, visited the campus. In a speech before more than 6,000 students and faculty, Kennedy discussed racial reconciliation and answered questions, including those about his role in Meredith's enrollment. To much laughter from the audience members, he told of a plan in which Barnett had asked that US Marshals point their guns at him while Meredith attempted to enroll so that "a picture could be taken of the event."

He also drew laughter by recounting another plan where Meredith would go to Jackson to enroll while Barnett remained in Oxford "and when Meredith was registered, he (Barnett) would feign surprise." Both plans were approved by Kennedy and failed only because of the development of events. When Kennedy finished his speech and question-and-answer session, he was greeted by a standing ovation.

The next day Barnett bitterly attacked Kennedy's version of events:

It ill becomes a man who never tried a lawsuit in his life, but who occupied the high position of United States attorney general and who was responsible for using 30,000 troops and spent approximately six million dollars to put one unqualified student in Ole Miss to return to the scene of this crime and discuss any phase of this infamous affair. ... I say to you that Bobby Kennedy is a very sick and dangerous American. We have lots of sick Americans in this country but most of them have a long beard. Bobby Kennedy is a hypocritical, left-wing beatnik without a beard who carelessly and recklessly distorts the facts.

== Later life ==
Gov. Barnett with President William David McCain (left) of Mississippi Southern College at the signing of the bill which granted the college university status. At right is then Lieutenant Governor Paul B. Johnson, Jr., who followed Barnett as governor.

Barnett attempted a political comeback by running for governor again in 1967 but lost, finishing a distant fourth in the state primary. He then returned to the practice of law, but remained unrepentant about his past, saying, "Generally speaking, I'd do the same things again." He also farmed and spoke before various groups, such as the American Legion.

Barnett expressed no remorse for his role in segregation. When he was asked in 1982 about the Ole Miss riot, Barnett said, "'I have no regrets, no apologies to make."

Ross Barnett Reservoir, located northeast of Jackson, is named in his honor. In May 2022, a petition began to be circulated to rename the reservoir after outdoors writer R. H. Cleveland. In Smith County, a lake was named after him before it was renamed Lake Prentiss Walker.

== Death ==
Barnett died of pneumonia on November 6, 1987 in Jackson, Mississippi. He was interred at Barnett Cemetery in Standing Pines, Mississippi.

Party political offices
Preceded by James P. Coleman	Democratic nominee for Governor of Mississippi; 1959	Succeeded by Paul B. Johnson Jr.
Political offices
Preceded by James P. Coleman	Governor of Mississippi; 1960–1964	Succeeded by Paul B. Johnson Jr.
