= Eleanor Butler =

Indentured white woman who married an enslaved African man in Maryland (1681)

Eleanor Butler (also known as Nell Butler or Irish Nell; born c. 1665 (Note: Estimated from her marriage at age 16 in 1681)) was an indentured white woman who married an enslaved African man in colonial Maryland in 1681.

== Biography ==
Butler, who was of Irish origin, was an indentured servant to Charles Calvert, 3rd Baron Baltimore. At around 16 years of age she announced her intention to marry a man referred to only as "Negro Charles". A 1664 (Note: Some sources, e.g. Whitman, give the date as 1663.) Maryland law outlined the legal status of a free woman who voluntarily married an enslaved man: she would serve the master of her husband until his death, and any offspring of their union would be born into slavery. (Note: Spelling as in original, quoted in Tomlins: All Children born of any Negro or other slaue shall be Slaues as their ffathers were for the terme of their liues. And forasmuch as diver freeborne English women forgettfull of their free Condicon and to the disgrace of our Nation doe intermarry with Negro Slaues by which also diuers suites may arise touching the Issue of such woemen and a great damage doth befall the Masters of such Negroes for preuention whereof for deterring such freeborne women from such shamefull Matches Bee itt further Enacted … That whatsoever free borne women shall inter marry with any slaue from and after the Last day of this present Assembly shall Serue the master of such slaue dureing the life of her husband. And that all the issue of such freeborne woemen soe marryed shall be Slaues as their fathers were. And Bee itt further Enacted that all the Issues of English or other freeborne woemen that haue already marryed Negroes shall serve the Masters of their Parents till they be Thirty years of age and no longer. Archives of Maryland, Volume I: Proceedings and Acts of the General Assembly of Maryland, January 1637/8 – September 1664 (Baltimore, 1883), pp 533–4) Despite this, Butler was determined to be wed. The thought of a white woman becoming enslaved distressed Lord Baltimore, and he warned against the union for that reason.

Lord Baltimore petitioned Maryland's provincial assembly to change the 1664 law, and in 1681, key provisions were repealed. The new law additionally outlawed marriages between female servants and enslaved men and provided for huge punitive fines to be levied on the enslaver ("master") of any enslaved person thus wed.

=== Family ===
Despite this, Butler and Charles married c. 1681, before the law went into effect. Because the new law did not apply retroactively, and perhaps also because Lord Baltimore left Maryland indefinitely in 1684, Butler and Charles lived out the rest of their lives enslaved by William Boarman, Eleanor Butler's husband's enslaver. They had seven or eight children, all born after the repeal of the 1664 law, but they were nonetheless born enslaved. One son, Jack, escaped and later bought his freedom from the Boarman family. The rest remained as human chattel.

In October 1770, two of their descendants, William and Mary Butler, still enslaved, filed suit for their freedom on the basis they were descendants of a white woman. Mary Butler was Nell Butler's great-granddaughter, but the provincial court ruled against them, noting that "many of these people, if turned loose, cannot mix with us and become members of society." Other suits from other descendants followed in the 1780s. In 1787, the daughter of William and Mary Butler – also named Mary – successfully sued for her freedom, but hers was a procedural victory devoid of any particular precedent. While her attorney hoped that the court would decide that any descendant of a white woman could not be enslaved, such a decision and the far-reaching effects it would have brought were not forthcoming. Instead, the court ruled that as no evidence existed of a legal union between Nell Butler and Negro Charles, the provisions of the 1664 law that condemned her and her offspring to slavery should not have applied in her case. This compromise ruling allowed Mary Butler her freedom without having any significant effect on property rights in the state.

== See also ==
- Agnes Kane Callum
- Brandywine people
- Margaret Cornish
