= Roldan v. Los Angeles County =

Roldan v. Los Angeles County, 129 Cal. App. 267, 18 P.2d 706, was a 1933 court case in California confirming that the state's anti-miscegenation laws at the time did not bar the marriage of a Filipino and a white person. However, the precedent lasted barely a week before the law was specifically amended to illegalize such marriages.

== Background ==
The case involved a Filipino American man, Salvador Roldan, engaged to a white British woman, Marjorie Rogers. Roldan was an Ilocano from northern Luzon. Since 1880, California Civil Code Section 60 had prohibited marriages between white persons and "negros", "mulattos", or "Mongolians", but there was confusion over whether Filipinos were part of that last category. California Attorney General Ulysses S. Webb had issued an advisory opinion in 1926 that Filipinos were part of the "Mongolian race". In 1930, a court had denied another Filipino man, Tony Moreno, permission to marry his white fiancée and ruled that Filipinos and other "Malayans" were part of the "Mongolian race" and thus not eligible to marry whites.

However, the following year, Judge Walter Guerin granted a marriage licence for Gavino Visco to marry Ruth M. Salas. The groom was a Filipino of Spanish ancestry, while the bride was an indigenous Mexican; however, Guerin stated that he would have granted the licence even if the bride were white. In August 1931, Roldan and Rogers's application for a marriage licence was rejected by the Los Angeles County clerk. The couple petitioned for a writ of mandate with the Superior Court of Los Angeles County. Judge Walter Gates granted the writ.

== Appeals ==
County counsels L. E. Lampton and Everett Mattoon appealed Gates' decision to the California Court of Appeal for the Second District. Webb, as well as Associate Attorney General Frank English, filed amici briefs on behalf of Lampton and Mattoon. While the case was being heard, other counties in California continued to refuse to issue marriage licences to Filipino-white couples. The appellate court's decision hinged on examination of the theories of racial anthropology current in the late 19th century when the law was drafted, in an effort to discern the legislative intent. County officials cited the work of Aleš Hrdlička in arguing that Filipinos were indeed part of the "Mongolian race". However, Justice T. Archbald, who wrote the opinion in the case, disagreed, stating that J. F. Blumenbach's taxonomy, which classified "Malays" and "Mongolians" separately, was the dominant theory through the early 20th century. He also pointed out that the term "Mongolians" in popular opinion was meant principally to apply to the Chinese, in reaction to the late 19th century influx of Chinese immigrants. The court thus concluded that Filipinos were members of the "Malay race" and not the "Mongoloid race", finding Roldan and Rogers' marriage legal.

County officials appealed the case again to the Supreme Court of California in 1933. On March 27, 1933, the Supreme Court announced that it would not review the case, effectively upholding the appellate court's decision. Soon after that announcement, the California State Legislature voted to amend Civil Code Section 60 to ensure that the law against interracial marriage also covered "members of the Malay race". California Governor James Rolph signed the amendment into law on April 5, 1933.

== Bibliography ==
- Baldoz, Rick (2011), The third Asiatic invasion: empire and migration in Filipino America, 1898–1946, NYU Press, ISBN 978-0-8147-9108-0
- Gross, Ariela Julie (2008), What blood won't tell: a history of race on trial in America, Harvard University Press, ISBN 978-0-674-03130-2
- Min, Pyong-Gap (2006), Asian Americans: Contemporary Trends and Issues, Pine Forge Press, ISBN 978-1-4129-0556-5
- Moran, Rachel F. (2003), Interracial Intimacy: The Regulation of Race and Romance, University of Chicago Press, ISBN 978-0-226-53663-7
- Tragen, Irving G. (September 1944), "Statutory Prohibitions against Interracial Marriage", California Law Review, 32 (3): 269–280, doi:10.2307/3476961, JSTOR 3476961
