= Coon (surname) =

This is a list of notable persons with the surname Coon.

- Adam Coon (born 1994), American wrestler and football player
- Bill Coon (born 1959), Canadian jazz guitarist and composer
- Carleton Coon, (1893–1932) co-founder of and drummer for the Coon-Sanders Original Nighthawk Orchestra
- Carleton S. Coon (1904–1981), American physical anthropologist and academic
- Caroline Coon (born 1945), English artist, journalist and activist
- Carrie Coon (born 1981), American actress
- Charles Coon (bridge) (1931–2003), American bridge player
- Charles E. Coon (1842–1920), American politician
- Charles L. Coon (1868–1927), teacher, school administrator and child labor reformer
- David Coon (born 1956), Canadian politician
- Edward William Coon, (1871–1934), American inventor of a maturation process for cheese after whom Coon cheese was named
- Eugene Coon (1929–1998), American law enforcement official
- Gene L. Coon (1924–1973), American screenwriter and television producer
- Henry Perrin Coon (1822–1884), American politician, doctor, businessman and teacher
- Jabez Coon (1869–1935), Australian politician
- James H. Coon (1914–1996), American physicist and academic
- Jeremy Coon (born 1979), American film producer
- Jessica Coon, American linguist and academic
- John Coon (sailor) (1929–2010), Australian sailor and Olympic athlete
- John Elton Coon (1907–1993), American politician
- John Saylor Coon (1854–1938), American mechanical engineer and academic
- Jonathan C. Coon (born 1970), American businessman
- Joshua Coon, American chemist and academic
- Larry Coon (born 1962), American computer scientist
- L. H. Coon (1842–1903), American politician
- Mandy Coon, American fashion designer
- Mary Coon Walters (née Coon, 1922–2001), American judge
- Minor J. Coon (1921–2018), American biochemist and academic
- Matthew Coon Come (born 1956), Canadian politician and activist
- Reuben W. Coon (1842–1908), American lawyer, newspaper editor, and politician
- S. Park Coon (1820–1883), American politician and soldier
- Sam Coon (1903–1980), American politician
- Ty Coon (1915–1992), American football player
- William Coon (1855–1915), American baseball player

== See also ==
- Koon (disambiguation)
