= Koontz =

Koontz may refer to:

- Koontz (surname)
- Koontz Lake, Indiana, a census-designated place in the U.S.
- Koontz House (disambiguation) – multiple buildings
- Koontz v. St. Johns River Water Management District, a 2013 United States Supreme Court case

== See also ==
- Koons
