= Coon =

Coon may refer to:

== Fauna ==
=== Butterflies ===
- Coon, common name of the butterfly Astictopterus jama
- Coon, species group of the butterfly genus Atrophaneura, now genus Losaria
- Coon, a common name of the skipper butterfly Psolos fuligo

=== Mammals ===
- Coon, an alternative name for Maine Coon, a breed of domestic cat
- Coon, a diminutive of raccoon

== People ==
- Coon (surname)
- Coön (Ancient Greek: Κόων, Κόωνος), a Trojan warrior who during the Trojan War wounded Agamemnon

== Arts and entertainment ==
- "Coon 2: Hindsight", a 2010 episode of American animated series South Park
- "The Coon", a 2009 episode of American animated series South Park
- Coon Can or Conquian, a card game

== Slang ==
- Coon (slur), racial slur used pejoratively to refer to a dark-skinned person of African, Indigenous Australian, or Pacific islander heritage
- Coon Carnival, the original name for the Kaapse Klopse, a yearly minstrel festival in Cape Town, South Africa
- Coon Chicken Inn, a former American restaurant chain whose trademarks and entrances were designed to look like a smiling blackface caricature of an African-American porter
- Coon song, a genre of music that presented a stereotyped image of black people
- Coonass or Coon-ass, an epithet used in reference to a person of Cajun ethnicity

== Other uses ==
- Cheer cheese, formerly Coon cheese, an Australian brand of cheese
- Coon hunting, a shortened form of the sport of raccoon hunting

== See also ==
- Coons (disambiguation)
- Coone (born 1983), a Belgian hardstyle musician and DJ
- Coonhound, a type of scent hound
- Koon (disambiguation)
