= John Coon =

John Coon may refer to:

- John Coon (sailor), Australian sailor
- John Saylor Coon, professor of mechanical engineering and drawing
- John Elton Coon, member of the Louisiana House of Representatives
