= Coons =

Coons may refer to:

== People ==
- Albert Coons (1912–1978), American physician, pathologist, and immunologist
- Alonzo B. Coons (1841–1914), American lawyer and politician
- Asa Coons (1993-2007), gunman in the SuccessTech Academy shooting
- Carleton S. Coon (1904–1981), American physical anthropologist
- Chris Coons (born 1963), American politician; U.S. Senator for Delaware
- Dana Coons (born 1978), American long-distance runner
- David Coons (born 1960), computer graphics specialist
- Gary Coons (born 1951), Canadian politician
- Maurice Coons (1908-1930), the given name of author Armitage Trail (1908-1930)
- Steven Anson Coons (1912-1979), early pioneer in the field of computer graphical methods

== Mathematics ==
- Coons patch, surface patch used in computer graphics

== Other meanings ==
- Coons! Night of the Bandits of the Night, a 2005 film

== See also ==
- Coon (disambiguation)
- Koons (disambiguation)
