= Garimella =

Garimella (Telugu: గరిమెళ్ళ) is a Telugu Brahmin and Chowdary surname. Notable people with the surname include:

- Garimella Balakrishna Prasad (born 1948), Indian classical devotional singer and composer
- Garimella Satyanarayana (1893–1952), Indian poet and freedom fighter
- Srinivas Garimella, Indian mechanical engineer
- Suresh Garimella (born 1964/65), Indian American mechanical engineer and university administrator
