= Koon =

Koon may refer to:

== People ==
- David Koon, New York politician
- Elaine Koon, Malaysian rhythmic gymnast
- Ella Koon, Hong Kong singer and actress
- Jason Koon (born 1985), American poker player
- Jonathan Koon, Chinese-American entrepreneur, artist, and fashion designer
- Larry Koon (author) (1946–2012), American writer on antiques and collectibles
- Larry Koon (politician) (1944–2021), American politician, member of the South Carolina House of Representatives
- Matthew Koon, English stage actor and dancer
- Stacey Koon, American policeman involved in the Rodney King incident
- Loi Ah Koon, founder of Ya Kun Kaya Toast
- Koon Wai Chee, Hong Kong badminton player

== Other uses ==
- 12242 Koon, a minor planet
- Red hind (Epinephelus guttatus), a fish also known as koon in Trinidad
- Emarginula koon, a species of sea snail
- The fully anglicized form of the Taa language

== See also ==
- Koons (disambiguation)
- Coon (disambiguation)
