= Larry Koon =

Larry Koon may refer to:

- Larry Koon (politician) (1944–2021), American politician, member of the South Carolina House of Representatives
- Larry Koon (author) (1945–2012), American writer on antiques and collectibles
