= NBA CBA =

NBA CBA may refer to:

- NBA collective bargaining agreement, a labor agreement in the National Basketball Association
- NBA–CBA relationship, the relationship between the National Basketball Association and the Continental Basketball Association
