= NBA salary cap =

National Basketball Association payment cap

The NBA salary cap is the limit to the total amount of money that National Basketball Association (NBA) teams are allowed to pay their players. Like the other major professional sports leagues in North America, the NBA has a salary cap to control costs and benefit parity, defined by the league's collective bargaining agreement (CBA). This limit is subject to a complex system of rules and exceptions and is calculated as a percentage of the league's revenue from the previous season. Under the CBA ratified in July 2017, the cap will continue to vary in future seasons based on league revenues. For the 2025–26 season, the cap is set at $154.647 million.

Half of major American leagues (NFL, NHL) have hard caps while the NBA and MLB have soft salary caps. Hard salary caps forbid teams from going above the salary cap. Soft salary caps allow teams to go above the salary cap, but will subject such teams to reduced privileges in free agency. Teams that go above the luxury tax cap are subject to the luxury tax (a tax on every dollar spent over the luxury tax cap).

== History ==
The NBA had a salary cap in the mid-1940s, but it was abolished after only one season. The league continued to operate without such a cap until the 1984–85 season, when one was instituted in an attempt to level the playing field among all of the NBA's teams and ensure competitive balance for the League in the future. Before the cap was reinstated, teams could spend whatever amount of money they wanted on players, but in the first season under the new cap, they were each limited to $4.6 million in total payroll.

Under the 2005 CBA, salaries were capped at 57 percent of basketball-related income (BRI) and lasted for six years until June 30, 2011. The next CBA, which took effect in 2011, set the cap at 51.2 percent of BRI in 2011–12, with a 49-to-51 band in subsequent years.

To ensure the players get their share of the BRI, teams are required to spend 90 percent of the salary cap each year. The salary cap for the 2022–23 season is $123.655 million (minimum team salary, which is set at 90 percent of the Salary Cap, is $111.290 million). The league's newest CBA, which took effect with the 2023–24 season, requires teams to meet the 90% salary floor at the start of preseason training camp.

In December 2016, the league and the players' union reached a tentative agreement on a new CBA, with both sides ratifying it by the end of that month. This agreement was set to run through the 2023–24 season, with either side able to opt out after the 2022–23 season. The league and union reached agreement on a new CBA that took effect in 2023–24.

NBA Salary Cap in USD	NBA Salary Cap in 2025 USD (Converted using CPI data)

== Soft versus hard caps ==
Unlike the NFL and NHL, the NBA features a so-called soft cap, meaning that there are several significant exceptions that allow teams to exceed the salary cap to sign players. This is done to allow teams to keep their own players, which, in theory, fosters fan support in each individual city. By contrast, the NFL and NHL salary caps are considered hard, meaning that they offer relatively few (if any) circumstances under which teams can exceed the salary cap. The NBA and MLS version of the "soft" cap does, however, offer less leeway to teams than that of Major League Baseball. MLB allows teams to spend as much as they want on salary, but it penalizes them a percentage of the amount by which they exceed the soft cap. The percentage increases as the number of consecutive years a team exceeds the cap grows, resetting only when a team falls under the cap.

== Luxury tax ==
While the soft cap allows teams to exceed the salary cap indefinitely by re-signing their own players using the "Larry Bird" family of exceptions, there are consequences for exceeding the cap by large amounts. A luxury tax payment is required of teams whose payroll exceeds a certain tax level, which is calculated using a "piecewise" mathematical function, and teams exceeding it are punished by being forced to pay bracket-based amounts for each dollar by which their payroll exceeds the tax level.

While most NBA teams hold contracts valued in excess of the salary cap, few teams have payrolls at luxury tax levels. The tax threshold in 2005–06 was $61.7 million. In 2005–06, the New York Knicks' payroll was $124 million, putting them $74.5 million above the salary cap, and $62.3 million above the tax line, which Knicks owner James Dolan paid to the league. Tax revenues are normally redistributed evenly among non-tax-paying teams, so there is often a several-million-dollar incentive to owners not to pay the luxury tax.

The 2011 CBA instituted major changes to the luxury tax regime. The previous CBA had a dollar-for-dollar tax provision system, which remained in effect through the 2012–13 season. Teams exceeding the tax level were punished by being forced to pay one dollar to the league for each dollar by which their payroll exceeded the tax level. Starting in 2013–14, the tax changed to an incremental system. Under the current system, tax is assessed at different levels based on the amount that a team is over the luxury tax threshold. The scheme is not cumulative—each level of tax applies only to amounts over that level's threshold. For example, a team that is $8 million over the tax threshold will pay $1.50 for each of its first $5 million over the tax threshold, and $1.75 per dollar for the remaining $3 million. Starting in 2014–15, "repeat offenders", subject to additional penalties, are defined as teams that paid tax in previous seasons. In the first season, repeat offenders from in all previous three seasons paid a stiffer tax rate; from 2015 to 2016 thereafter, teams paying taxes in three out of four years are subject to the higher repeater rate. As in the previous CBA, the tax revenue is divided among teams with lower payrolls. However, under the new scheme, no more than 50% of the total tax revenue can go exclusively to teams that did not go over the cap. Initial reports did not specify the use of the remaining 50% under the 2011 CBA, but it was later confirmed that this amount would be used to fund revenue sharing for the season during which tax was paid.

For the 2013–14 season, the luxury tax threshold was set at $71.748 million. The Brooklyn Nets, whose payroll for that season was projected to be over $100 million, would face a luxury tax bill above $80 million, resulting in a total payroll cost of $186 million.

=== Tax levels from 2023–24 ===
Amount over tax threshold	Standard tax per excess dollar	Repeat offender tax per excess dollar
$5 million to $9,999,999	$1.75	$2.75
$10 million to $14,999,999	$2.50	$3.50
$15 million to $19,999,999	$3.25	$4.25
Over $20 million	$3.75 + $0.50 per $5 million	$4.75 + $0.50 per $5 million

The NBA's newest CBA, which took effect for the 2023–24 season, significantly changed the tax regime. First, the luxury tax brackets, which had been fixed amounts since 2013–14, now change each season by the same percentage as the salary cap. More significantly, a second tax "apron" has been introduced, which for 2023–24 was expected to be triggered at about $17.5 million over the tax line. Teams above the second apron face new restrictions on player movement, which will be discussed in later sections.

== Exceptions ==
Because the NBA's salary cap is a soft one, the NBA allows for several important scenarios in which a team can sign players even if their payroll exceeds the cap. The exceptions are as follows:

=== Mid-level exception ===
Once a year, teams can use a mid-level exception (MLE) to sign a player to a contract for a specified maximum amount. The amount of the MLE and its duration depend on the team's cap status. In the 2017 CBA, the MLE was initially set at $8.406 million in the 2017–18 season for teams that are over the cap either before or after the signing, but under the luxury tax apron, set at $6 million above the tax line. Teams can use this exception to offer contracts of up to four years. Teams above the apron have an MLE initially set at $5.192 million, allowing contracts of up to three years. Teams with cap room, which were ineligible for the MLE before the 2011 CBA, have an MLE initially set at $4.328 million that allows two-year contracts. In subsequent seasons, all MLE amounts will be determined by applying the percentage change of the salary cap to the previous exception amount.

Before the 2011 CBA, the MLE was equal to the average NBA salary for all teams over the cap; teams with cap room were then ineligible for the MLE. The Mid-Level Exception for the 2008–09 NBA season was $5.585 million. The MLE was $5.854 million for the 2009–10 NBA regular season.

Under the 2017 CBA, the apron was initially set at $6 million above the tax line for the 2017–18 season. In a new feature, the apron changes from season to season, with the percentage change (up or down) set at half of the rate of change of the cap for that season.

The 2023 CBA introduces major changes to the MLE regime. As noted earlier, the 2023 CBA introduces a second tax apron, initially at about $17.5 million above the tax line for 2023–24. Use of the taxpayer MLE now makes the second apron a hard salary cap. Also, teams that are above the second apron cannot use the MLE to sign free agents; they also cannot sign free agents whose contracts have been bought out by their previous teams. The 2023 CBA also increases the non-taxpayer MLE by 7.5% from 2022–23, when the maximum starting salary on such a contract was $10.49 million. The cap room MLE, which had been $5.401 million in 2022–23, will increase by 30%, with its maximum contract length increased to three years.

=== Bi-annual exception ===
The bi-annual exception can currently be used by teams below the apron to sign a free agent to a contract starting at $3.29 million. Like the mid-level exception, the bi-annual exception can also be split among more than one player, and can be used to sign players for up to two years; raises were originally limited to 8% per year, but in the 2017 CBA are limited to 5%. This exception was referred to as the "$1 million exception" in the 1999 CBA, although it was valued at $1 million for only the first year of the agreement.

An example of the bi-annual exception was the Los Angeles Lakers' signing of Karl Malone to a contract before the 2003–04 season.

The exception was eliminated for teams above the tax apron following the 2011 NBA lockout as many high spending teams were using this as a tool to gain top paid players.

A team cannot use this exception in consecutive years; a team that used it in 2016–17 (under the 2011 CBA) could not use it in 2017–18 (under the 2017 CBA). It also cannot be used by a team that has already used an MLE in the same season. Additionally, once a team uses the bi-annual exception, the tax apron (from 2023–24, the first apron) becomes a hard salary cap for the remainder of that season.

=== Rookie exception ===
The NBA allows teams to sign their first-round draft choices to rookie "scale" contracts even if their payroll exceeds the cap.

=== Second-round pick exception ===
The 2023 CBA created the second-round pick exception which allows teams to sign their second-round draft picks for up to four years without counting against the cap until July 31 of the player's first season.

The first second-round pick exception was executed by the Sacramento Kings when they signed No. 34 overall pick Colby Jones.

=== Two-way contracts ===
The 2017 CBA introduced two-way contracts between NBA teams and players in the NBA G League (formerly the D-League). Before the 2017 CBA, all D-League players were contracted directly with the league, and all D-League players could be called up by any NBA team, regardless of whether they were affiliated with the player's D-League team. Now, each NBA team can sign two players to contracts that allow them to assign the players to the G League without risk of being "poached" by another NBA team. The players signed to such deals benefit by receiving a considerably higher salary than other G League players while in that league, as well as earning a prorated share of the NBA minimum rookie salary for each day they are with their contracted NBA team. Salaries of two-way players are not included in salary cap calculations. Additionally, a team can convert a two-way contract to a standard NBA contract at any time, with the player's salary becoming the NBA minimum for the player's years of service, prorated from the time of the conversion; a converted contract also does not count in cap calculations.

The 2023 CBA increased the number of two-way slots to three for each team.

==== Exhibit 10 ====
Related to the two-way contract, and also introduced in the 2017 CBA, is an attachment to the standard NBA contract known as Exhibit 10. A contract that contains this attachment may be converted to a two-way contract at the team's option. Exhibit 10 can be used only in one-year, non-guaranteed contracts for the minimum NBA salary, with no bonuses except for an "Exhibit 10 bonus" of $5,000 to $50,000. The bonus is paid if the player is waived by his NBA team, signs with the G League, is assigned to that NBA team's G League affiliate, and remains with the affiliate at least 60 days. The bonus is not counted against the salary cap, but is counted in overall league salaries. Each NBA team is limited to six active contracts that contain Exhibit 10 at any given time.

The 2023 CBA increased the maximum Exhibit 10 bonus to $75,000.

=== Larry Bird exception ===
Perhaps the most well-known of the NBA's salary cap exceptions is the Larry Bird exception, so named because the Boston Celtics were the first team permitted to exceed the salary cap to re-sign one of their own players (in that case, Larry Bird). Free agents who qualify for this exception are called "qualifying veteran free agents" or "Bird Free Agents" in the CBA, and this exception falls under the terms of the Veteran Free Agent exception. In essence, the Larry Bird exception allows teams to exceed the salary cap to re-sign their own free agents, at an amount up to the maximum salary. To qualify as a Bird free agent, a player must have played three seasons without being waived or changing teams as a free agent. Players claimed after being amnestied have their Bird rights transferred to their new team. Other players claimed off waivers are not eligible for the full Bird exception, but may qualify for the early Bird exception. Prior to an arbitrator ruling in June 2012, all players that were waived and changed teams lost their Bird rights. This means a player can obtain "Bird rights" by playing under three one-year contracts, a single contract of at least three years, or any combination thereof. It also means that when a player is traded, his Bird rights are traded with him, and his new team can use the Bird exception to re-sign him. Since the 2011 CBA, Bird-exception contracts can be up to five years in length, down from six under the 2005 CBA.

==== Early Bird exception ====
The lesser form of the Larry Bird exception is the "early Bird" exception. Free agents who qualify for this exception are called "early qualifying veteran free agents", and qualify after playing two seasons with the same team. Players that are traded or claimed off waivers have their Bird rights transferred to their new team. Prior to an arbitrator ruling in June 2012, all players that were waived and changed teams lost their Bird rights. Using this exception, a team can re-sign its own free agent for either 175% of his salary the previous season, or the NBA's average salary, whichever is greater. Early Bird contracts must be for at least two seasons, but can last no longer than four seasons. If a team agrees to a trade that would make a player lose his Early Bird Rights, he has the power to veto the trade.

A much-publicized example for this was Devean George, who vetoed his inclusion into a larger trade during the 2007–08 season that would have sent him from the Dallas Mavericks to the New Jersey Nets.

=== Non-Bird exception ===
"Non-qualifying free agents" (those who do not qualify under either the Larry Bird exception or the early Bird exception) are subject to the non-Bird exception. Under this exception, teams can re-sign a player to a contract beginning at either 120% of his salary for the previous season, or 120% of the league's minimum salary, whichever amount is higher. Contracts signed under the Non-Bird exception can last up to four years (down from six under the 2005 CBA).

=== Minimum Salary Exception ===
Teams can sign players for the NBA's minimum salary even if they are over the cap, for up to two years in length. In the case of two-year contracts, the second-season salary is the minimum salary for that season. The contract may not contain a signing bonus. This exception also allows minimum-salary players to be acquired via trade. There is no limit to the number of players that can be signed or acquired using this exception.

=== Traded Player Exception ===
Ordinarily a team cannot engage in a trade which would leave it $100,000 above the salary cap, regardless of whether the trade reduces or increase its overall payroll, and requires exceptions in order to do so. The traded player exception is one of such.

The exception allows a team to trade for any player, or number of players, as long as their collective incoming salary does not exceed a set amount, which is based on whether if the team pays the luxury tax after the trade, and the collective outgoing (of the players the team is trading away) salary. Taxpaying teams can absorb up to 125% of the outgoing salary + $100,000, and for non-taxpayers the amount is as follows:

Outgoing Salary	Incoming Salary Allowed
$0–$6,533,333	175% of the outgoing salary + $100,000
$6,533,334–$19.6 million	Outgoing salary + $5,000,000
>$19.6 million	125% of the outgoing salary + $100,000

Also, if a team trades away players with higher salary than of the players they acquire in return, the traded player exception allows them to acquire players with salaries not exceeding such difference + $100,000, for up to one year after the trade in which they acquired such a credit.

The 2023 CBA imposes severe trading restrictions on teams that are above the second tax apron. They are not allowed to send cash out in trades and cannot take in more salary than they send out. Also, while NBA teams are normally allowed to trade draft picks up to seven years in the future, the seventh year will not be available to teams above the second apron.

=== Disabled Player Exception ===
Allows a team that is over the cap to acquire a replacement for a disabled player who will be out for either the remainder of that season (for in-season injuries/deaths) or the next season (if the disability occurs during the offseason). The maximum salary of the replacement player is either 50% of the injured player's salary, or the mid-level exception for a non-taxpaying team, whichever is less. This exception requires an NBA-designated doctor to verify the extent of the injury. Under the 2005 CBA, a team could sign a player under this exception for five years; since the 2011 CBA, it has been allowed only for one year.

Note that while teams can often use one exception to sign multiple players, they cannot use a combination of exceptions to sign a single player.

=== Reinstatement ===
A player banned from the league for a drug-related offense who is reinstated may be re-signed by his prior team for a salary up to his previous salary.

== Individual contracts under the CBA ==
The maximum player salary is based on the number of years that player has played and the total of the salary cap. The maximum salary of a player with 6 or fewer years of experience is either $25,500,000 or 25% of the total salary cap (projected for 2017–18), whichever is greater. For a player with 7–9 years of experience, the maximum is $30,600,000 or 30% of the cap, and for a player with 10+ years of experience, the maximum is $35,700,000 or 35% of the cap. The players on maximum contracts may also receive an annual raise of up to 8% each year for up to five years, even if over individual salary maximum limit. Maximum contracts are usually five years long since that's how long a Larry Bird exemption contract can be. There is an exception to this rule: a player is able to sign a contract for 105% of his previous contract, even if the new contract is higher than the league limit.

The 2017 CBA made a subtle change to the determination of maximum salaries. Under the 2011 CBA, the salary cap was based on players receiving 44.74% of the league's basketball-related income (BRI), while the calculation of maximum salaries used a lower figure of 42.14% of BRI. This difference was eliminated in the 2017 CBA, with the same 44.74% of BRI used for both cap and maximum salary calculations. The 2023 CBA adds league licensing revenue to the definition of BRI, which is expected to boost the salary cap by at least $2 million.

=== Rookie scale salary ===
First-round draft choices are assigned salaries according to their draft position. The first overall pick receives more than the second pick, the second more than the third, and so on. Each contract is for two years, with a team option for the third and fourth seasons (CBAs before 2011 provided for three-year contracts with an option for the fourth season), with built-in raises every year to compensate for increases in the average salary. A team may elect to exceed rookie scale for a drafted player that was unsigned for which they retained his draft rights three seasons after the draft. The contract would be for at least three seasons, with a maximum value up to the team's available cap room.

In 2017, the scale for lottery picks was as follows:

Second-round picks are not subject to a scale, and technically can be paid anywhere from the minimum to the maximum contract amount. In practice, they rarely receive more than the minimum.

Prior to the 2017 CBA, the rookie scales for each season were negotiated into the agreement. For the current agreement, only the rookie scales for the 2017–18 season were determined in advance. In subsequent seasons, the percentage change in the salary cap will be applied to all dollar amounts in the previous season's scale. Amounts that are expressed as a percentage of salary, such as the allowable salary change from the third to the fourth season of the rookie contract, remain the same from season to season.

=== Designated Player ===
Since the 2011 CBA, each NBA team has been able to nominate a player on his rookie contract to receive a "Designated Player" contract extension. A Designated Player is eligible for a five-year contract extension, instead of being held to the standard four-year restriction. From 2011 through the 2016–17 season, a team could only allocate a single Designated Player contract at any one time (if a team had already extended a rookie contract by using the Designated Player extension, they could not create a second Designated Player contract until the current contract expired, or until the player moved to a different team); however the 2011 CBA allowed teams to sign a second Designated Player from another team in addition to the one they already had. All teams were limited to having a maximum of two Designated Players contracted on their roster at any time (one that they had created from one of their own rookie contracts and one acquired from another team).

Under the 2017 CBA, the "Designated Player" limit remained at two, but in a new feature, teams are now able to create Designated Player contracts from their own veteran contracts. In addition, teams may now use their Designated Player slots on any combination of their own rookie contracts, their own veteran contracts, or players acquired in trades.

The 2023 CBA allows teams to offer supermax contracts to all players eligible for them, as long as the teams do not violate other cap rules in the process. Previously, teams could not have more than one "Derrick Rose Rule" player (see below) on their rosters if they did not draft at least one of them; this notably prevented the Boston Celtics from trading for Anthony Davis when they had Kyrie Irving on their roster. One beneficiary of the new rule was expected to be the Cleveland Cavaliers, which became able to sign Evan Mobley to a Rose Rule supermax after the 2023–24 season if he qualified for the contract. Under previous rules, the Cavaliers could not have done so because Darius Garland (drafted by the team) and Donovan Mitchell (acquired by trade) had Rose Rule supermax contracts.

==== "Derrick Rose" Rule ====
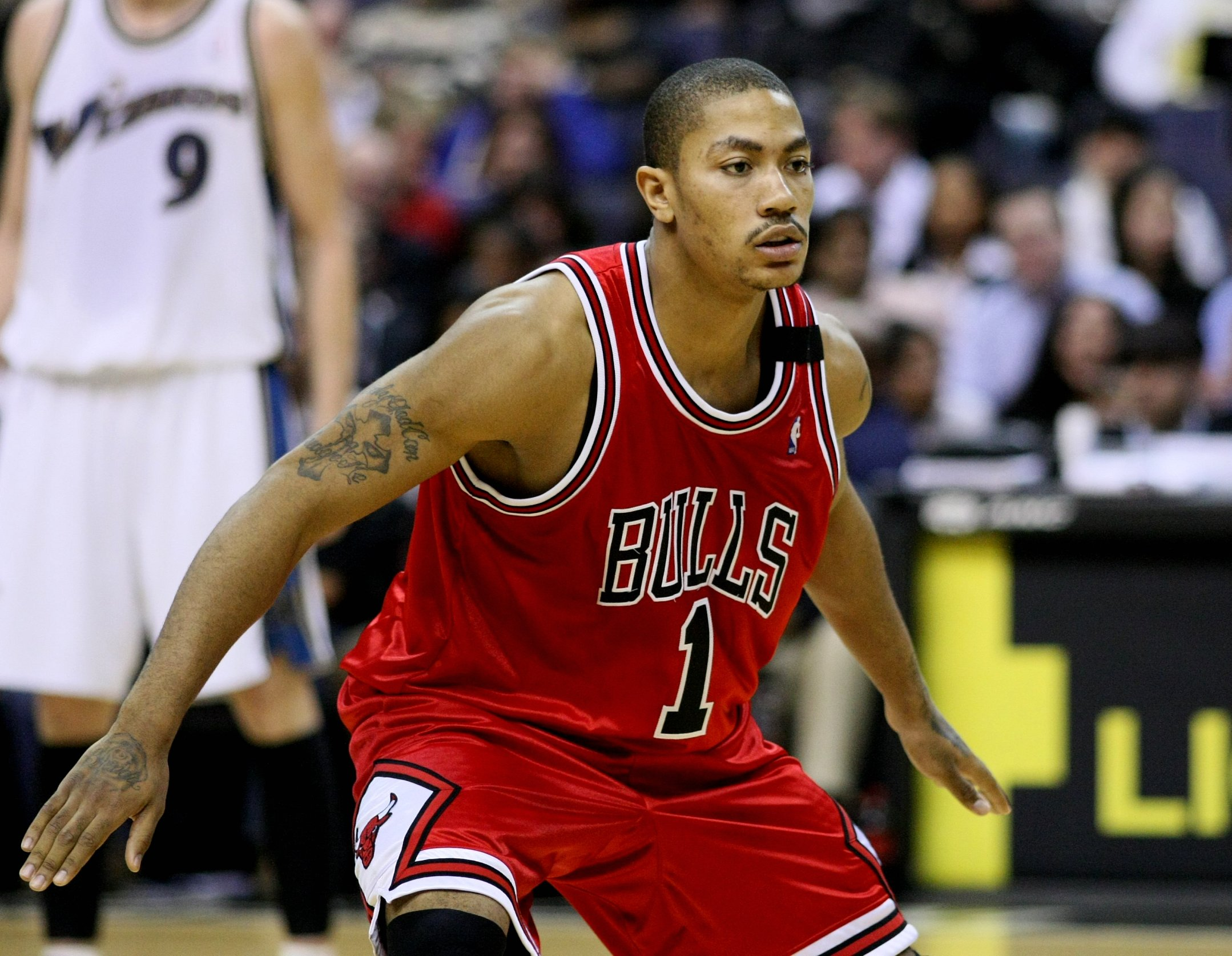
In a rule named after Derrick Rose, accomplished players coming off their rookie contract could earn more money in the 2011 CBA.

A Designated Player coming off his rookie contract may be eligible to earn 30% of the salary cap (rather than the standard 25%) if he attains certain criteria. Through the 2017–18 season, in order to be eligible, the player must be voted to start in two All-Star Games, or be named to an All-NBA Team twice (at any level), or be named MVP. Officially titled the "5th Year 30% Max Criteria", it has been dubbed (and is more commonly known as) the "Derrick Rose Rule" after the 2011 MVP, due to the fact that when the criteria were introduced, Rose was the only player in the NBA eligible to sign the maximum extension (due to his MVP award). The reasoning for the rule is to suitably reward players being extended off their rookie contract who are considered to be of a higher "caliber" than their peers, without restricting them to the lower (25%) salary level. A player may sign a "5th Year, 30% Max" contract before the final year of his rookie contract and before fulfilling the criteria needed to receive the 30% salary grade. Should the player fail to fulfill the criteria before the start of his Designated Player contract, he will receive the standard five-year, 25% Designated Player contract. James Harden of the Los Angeles Clippers and Anthony Davis of the Los Angeles Lakers had such a clause in their contract extensions, but both failed to meet the criteria. The only player in the NBA who was attempting to qualify for a full 30% contract in 2013–14 was Paul George, who signed a provisional 30%/five-year contract in September 2013. George, who had made the All-NBA third team in 2012–13, qualified by again making the All-NBA third team.

The 2017 CBA changed the qualification criteria for "5th Year, 30% Max" contracts. Players who come off rookie contracts at the end of the 2017–18 season, or later, must meet any of the following criteria to qualify:

- Selection to an All-NBA team (at any level) in the player's fourth season, or in two of the three seasons between his second and fourth seasons.
- Selection as Defensive Player of the Year in the player's fourth season, or in two of the three seasons between his second and fourth seasons.
- Selection as MVP in any season from the player's second onward.

These criteria are identical to those for the veteran player extensions introduced in the 2017 CBA. Had these criteria been part of the 2011 CBA, Rose would still have qualified for a 30% contract, as he was in his third NBA season when he was named MVP.

===== 5/30% Contracts =====
The following players have signed five-year/30% contracts:

Under the 2011 CBA

- Derrick Rose (signed with the Chicago Bulls; was later traded to the New York Knicks during the last year on that deal) until 2017 (qualified by winning the 2011 MVP award)
- Blake Griffin (signed with the L.A. Clippers; was later traded to the Detroit Pistons in 2018) signed through 2018 (qualified by making the All-NBA second team in 2011–12 and 2012–13)
- Paul George (signed with Indiana Pacers; since has been traded to the Oklahoma City Thunder and then to the Los Angeles Clippers prior to the 2019 season) signed until 2019 (qualified by making the All-NBA third team in 2012–13 and 2013–14)

Under the 2017 CBA

- Luka Dončić (signed with the Dallas Mavericks in the 2021 offseason), signed from 2022 to 2023 through 2026–27. Under the current 5/30% criteria, he was the first player to have been eligible for such a contract before signing, as he had been named to the All-NBA first team in 2019–20 and 2020–21.

===== 5/25% Contracts =====
In addition the following players are known to have signed five-year/25% contracts:

- Joel Embiid (Philadelphia 76ers) until 2023
- Russell Westbrook (Oklahoma City Thunder) until 2017
- Anthony Davis (New Orleans Pelicans) until 2021
- John Wall (Washington Wizards) until 2019
- James Harden (Houston Rockets) until 2018
- Kyrie Irving (Boston Celtics) until 2020
- Damian Lillard (Portland Trail Blazers) until 2021

Kevin Love was eligible for a designated player contract, but the Minnesota Timberwolves opted for a 4-year contract (with a player option year included, potentially allowing him to become an unrestricted free agent) instead. During Kevin Durant's final five seasons with the Oklahoma City Thunder (2011–2016), he received a Designated Player level salary. His contract was initially drawn up before the lockout—during which the Derrick Rose Rule was implemented—but was officially approved under the provisions of the 2005 CBA by the NBA after the lockout. This led some people to question whether the Thunder had (with NBA approval) effectively signed two players as their Designated Player, as both were contracted for 5 years.

==== "Supermax" Rule ====
A provision in the 2017 CBA allows teams to create Designated Player contracts for their own veteran players, officially known as the "Designated Veteran Player Extension" (DVPE). It came to be called the "Kevin Durant Rule", because it was seen as a reaction to a wave of veteran superstars leaving their teams in free agency, capped off by Durant's departure from the Thunder to the Golden State Warriors in the 2016 offseason. Such contracts are also commonly described as or called "supermax". The 2011 CBA allowed all of the teams that were trying to lure Durant to offer him the same initial salary of $26.5 million.

For a veteran player to qualify for such an extension, he must be entering his eighth or ninth season in the NBA, and have either:

- made the All-NBA team (at any level) in either the season immediately before signing the extension, or two of the three previous seasons;
- been named NBA Defensive Player of the Year in either the season immediately before signing the extension, or two of the three previous seasons; or
- been named NBA MVP at least once in the previous three seasons.

Additionally, the team offering the extension must have originally drafted the player, or obtained him in a trade while he was on his rookie contract.

Players who qualify can be offered contracts with a starting salary between 30 and 35% of the salary cap. The extension cannot last more than five years after the expiration of the player's current contract (or five years for a player who is a free agent when signed), but can be negotiated and signed one year before the current contract expires. The extension can be offered to a team's own free agent as well as a player with time left on his contract. Additionally, once a player signs a DVPE, he cannot be traded for one year.

Ironically, while the rule was intended to encourage star players to stay with their current teams, the first major move by an NBA team involving a player eligible for the DVPE was the Sacramento Kings' trade of DeMarcus Cousins to the New Orleans Pelicans during the 2017 All-Star break. Cousins' contract with the Kings was not set to expire until 2018, but he was eligible to sign a DVPE after the 2016–17 season for up to $209 million over five years, a financial commitment that the Kings were apparently unwilling to make.

By the end of the 2018–19 season, Sports Illustrated writer Andrew Sharp began a story on the supermax rule with the following sentence: "If you've been paying attention to the NBA for the past two years, it goes without saying that the NBA's "supermax" contracts have been a failure." First, he noted that supermax money was not enough to discourage superstars on small-market teams from seeking to join title contenders, even for noticeably less money. Sharp argued that the rule in fact created more problems than it solved:

Teams who develop and retain homegrown superstars will find themselves rewarded with uniquely-bloated salary caps and stiff luxury tax payments. Meanwhile, superstars who decide to stay loyal will be asked to spend their prime with shorthanded rosters and handicapped front offices.

Sharp's colleague Rohan Nadkarni questioned the DVPE eligibility criteria, as key players like Klay Thompson and Karl-Anthony Towns are not eligible despite their excellent performances.

===== Players eligible for the supermax =====
Following the announcement of the 2016–17 All-NBA team, four players were eligible to sign DVPE contracts during the 2017 offseason:

- Stephen Curry of the Golden State Warriors
- James Harden of the Houston Rockets
- John Wall of the Washington Wizards
- Russell Westbrook of the Oklahoma City Thunder

All four were named to one of the three All-NBA teams for that season, though two, Curry and Westbrook, were already eligible under the new criteria. Harden and Westbrook would not have qualified under the standard DVPE criteria because both signed extensions to their contracts in the 2016 offseason, Harden for two years and Westbrook for one. The players' union and owners negotiated a special dispensation allowing them to sign DVPE contracts should they otherwise qualify.

The next player to qualify for a supermax contract was Anthony Davis, who at the time had played his entire NBA career with the New Orleans Pelicans. He qualified by being named to the All-NBA first team in 2017–18, enabling the Pelicans to offer him a five-year extension worth up to $230 million, effective with the 2019–20 season. Davis also became the first player to publicly turn down a supermax offer, notifying the Pelicans during the 2018–19 season that he would not accept a supermax deal and also requesting a trade. Davis would ultimately be traded to the Los Angeles Lakers after the 2018–19 season.

During the 2019 season, four further players qualified for supermax deals. Damian Lillard and Kemba Walker both qualified to immediately sign supermax deals by making a 2018–19 All-NBA Team. While Giannis Antetokounmpo would not have become a free agent until the 2021 offseason, he became eligible to sign a supermax deal in 2020 by making All-NBA Teams in both 2017–18 and 2018–19; he would later meet another supermax criterion by being named the 2019 MVP. Rudy Gobert became eligible by claiming Defensive Player of the Year honors for the second straight season. The Charlotte Hornets did not offer Walker a supermax deal, instead sending him to the Boston Celtics in a sign-and-trade deal in the 2019 offseason. Gobert signed a five-year extension with the Utah Jazz in the 2020 offseason, but chose not to take the full supermax of $228 million, instead opting for $205 million to give the team more cap room.

===== Supermax contracts =====
The first player to sign a supermax contract was Stephen Curry, who agreed to a new five-year DVPE deal with the Warriors, worth $201 million, that ran through the 2021–22 season. Curry signed the contract once the NBA's free agency moratorium ended on July 6, 2017.

Shortly thereafter, James Harden agreed on a DVPE with the Rockets. At the time of signing, his current contract had two years remaining with total pay of $59 million; the extension added another $170 million over four seasons, ending in 2022–23.

The next supermax signing was that of John Wall, who agreed later in July to a four-year, $170 million extension that began in 2019–20. In late September, Russell Westbrook became the fourth and final supermax signing of the 2017 offseason, signing a five-year, $205 million extension that started in 2018–19.

Damian Lillard agreed to a four-year, $196 million extension with the Portland Trail Blazers during the 2019 offseason. The extension starts in 2021–22 and includes a player option for 2024–25.

Giannis Antetokounmpo agreed to a five-year, $228 million extension with the Milwaukee Bucks during the 2020 offseason. The extension started in 2021–22 and includes a player option for 2025–26.

During the 2023 offseason, Jaylen Brown signed a five-year, $304 million supermax extension with the Boston Celtics, the largest contract in NBA history. That contract was surpassed by his teammate Jayson Tatum the following offseason, who also signed a supermax extension with the Celtics for five years, $315 million.

=== Over-38 rule ===
The cap also includes a provision to close a potential loophole that would provide incentives for teams to skirt the cap by signing an older player to a long-term deal that would not end until after the team expects the player to retire. Cap analyst Larry Coon outlined how this potential loophole would work:

For example, suppose the Non-Taxpayer Mid-Level exception is $9 million. With 5% raises, a three-year contract would total $28.35 million. But if they added a fourth year to the contract, the salary would total $38.7 million. If the player retires after three seasons and continues drawing his salary for the additional season, then he effectively will be paid $38.7 million for three years' work. In essence, they are giving the player a three-year contract with additional deferred compensation.

To address this issue, CBAs since at least the 1990s have included what is now called the "over-38 rule", under which certain contracts that extend past the player's 38th birthday (Note: For the purposes of the over-38 rule only, seasons start on October 1. A player's age for a contract year is considered to be his age as of September 30.) are presumed to cover seasons following the player's expected retirement. The age threshold that triggered this rule was originally set at 35, changed to 36 in the 1999 CBA, and changed again to 38 in the 2017 CBA. The salary for any years that come after the player's 38th birthday is presumed to be deferred compensation, and is shifted for cap purposes to the under-38 seasons of the deal, with the over-38 year(s) being referred to as "zero years" in the CBA. If the player continues to play under the deal (proving the presumption of retirement wrong), the salary that had originally been treated as deferred is distributed evenly over the remaining years of the contract, starting with the second season before the zero years. This rule had been a larger issue before the 2011 CBA, which limited the maximum contract length to 5 years.

While the threshold age was changed in the 2017 CBA, the mechanics of the rule remained the same. Notably, several members of the union's executive committee at the time the 2017 CBA was negotiated were older players who were seen as potential major beneficiaries of a change to an over-38 rule. For example, the change to an over-38 rule gave union president Chris Paul, scheduled to become a free agent after the 2016–17 season, a potential gain of nearly $50 million over the life of his next contract. Similarly, executive committee members LeBron James and Carmelo Anthony, who could opt out of their current contracts after the same season, had the potential for similar gains with this change.

=== Options ===
Many NBA contracts are structured with options for either the player or the team. An option gives that party the right to extend the contract for one more season, at a salary no less than the prior year's amount.

== Free agency ==
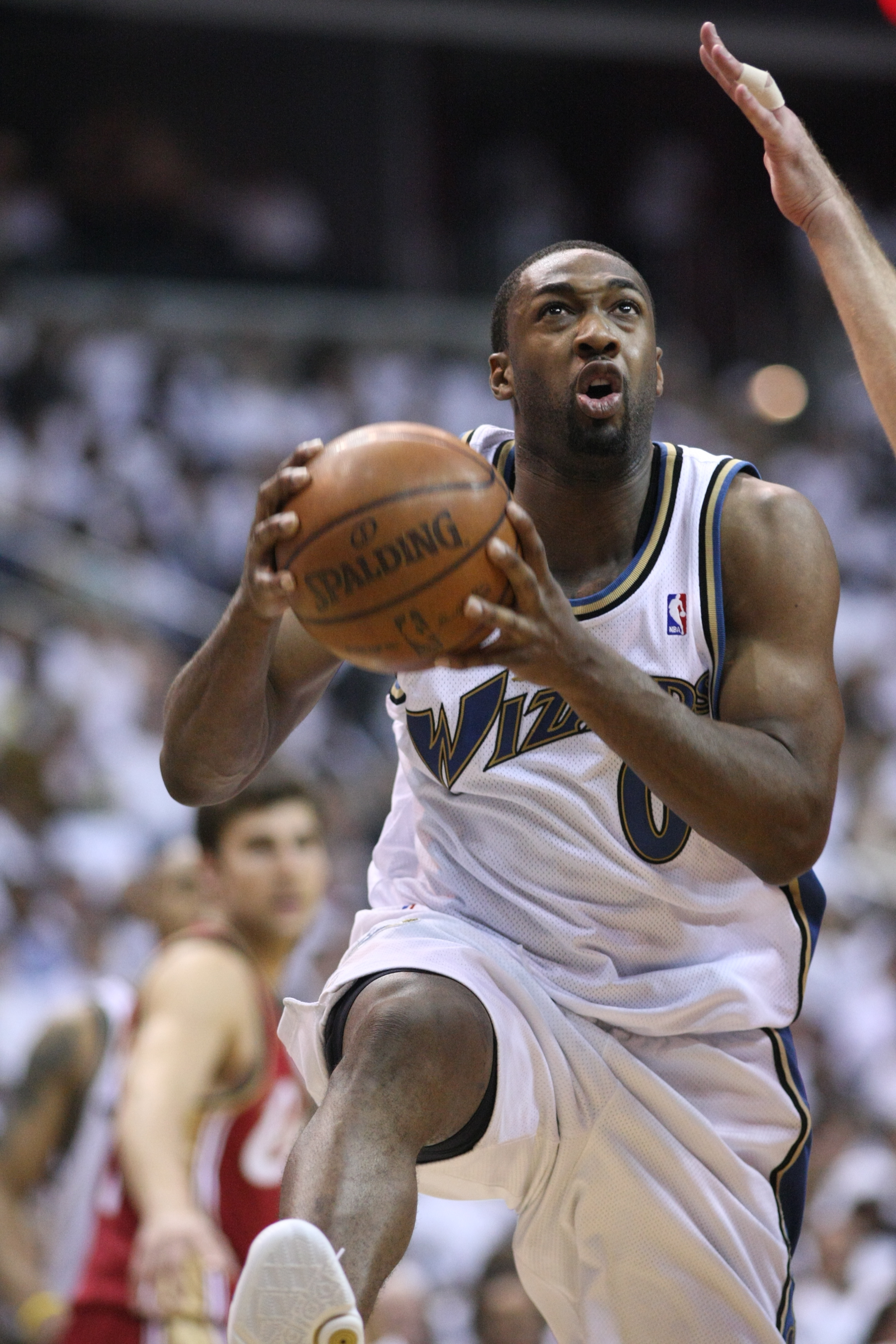
Gilbert Arenas, pictured here in 2008, was able to receive a bigger contract as a restricted free agent by leaving the Golden State Warriors for the Washington Wizards in 2003, prompting the "Gilbert Arenas Rule".

There are two types of free agency under the NBA's Collective Bargaining Agreement: Unrestricted and Restricted. Rather than spending salaries on teams like Major League Baseball, the NBA has a policy that strictly prohibits it using the salary cap in that fashion.

=== Unrestricted free agent ===
An unrestricted free agent is free to sign with any team that they choose to.

=== Restricted free agent ===
A restricted free agent is subject to his current team's Right of First Refusal, meaning that the player can be signed to an offer sheet by another team, but his current club reserves the right to match the offer and keep the player. An offer sheet is a contract offer of at least two years made by another team to a restricted free agent. The player's current club has three days to match the offer or they lose the player to the new team; the CBA prior to 2011 allowed seven days.

For first-round draft picks, restricted free agency is only allowed after a team exercises its option for a fourth year, and the team makes a Qualifying Offer at the Rookie-scale amount after the fourth year is completed. For any other player to be a restricted free agent, he must be at most a three-year NBA veteran, and his team must have made a Qualifying Offer for either 125% of his previous season's salary or the minimum salary plus $200,000, whichever offer is higher.

Teams are limited in what they can offer an unrestricted free agent with two years or less experience. The maximum first-year salary in an offer sheet is the mid-level exception. The second-year salary can be raised a maximum of 4.5%. The third year salary is limited to the maximum a team has available in their salary cap. The salary in the fourth season may increase (or decrease) by up to 4.1% of the salary in the third season. The offer sheet can only increase in the third season if it provides the highest salary allowed in the first two seasons, the contract is fully guaranteed, and it contains no bonuses. A player's original team can use the Early Bird exception or their Mid-Level exception to re-sign the player.

If the raise in the third season is greater than 4.5% of the first year, the offering team must be able to fit the average of the entire contract under their cap. Through the 2016–17 season, the accounting was different for the player's original team, where the player's salary for a given year—not the contract's average—was counted against the cap. In some cases, the offering team could exploit a loophole to create what is referred to as a poison pill for the player's original team, potentially forcing the original team to pay the luxury tax by the third season, as the Houston Rockets did in order to sign Jeremy Lin and Ömer Aşık away from the New York Knicks and Chicago Bulls, respectively. This could discourage them from matching the offer sheet.

The 2017 CBA changed the accounting rules for the player's original team in this scenario. If the original team matches, and has enough cap space to absorb the average annual salary of the offer, it can choose to take cap hits of either the actual contract payouts or the average of the contract in each season.

Before the 2005 CBA, the original team could only use an exception to re-sign a player who had been drafted in the first round. The 2005 CBA allowed teams to use exceptions on non-first-round picks, with the extension named the "Gilbert Arenas Rule". In 2003, Gilbert Arenas, who had been a second-round pick in 2001, signed a six-year, $60 million contract with the Washington Wizards after his original team, the Golden State Warriors, were unable to match the offer since they were over the salary cap.

=== July moratorium ===
Players on a team's season-ending roster remain under contract with their respective team until the start of the new league year on July 1. From 6 pm Eastern Time (UTC−4) on June 30 and through the first few days of July, teams may begin negotiating with free agents, but trades cannot be made and most free agents cannot be signed; this is known as the "moratorium period". Contracts that are allowed during this period are limited to:

- Rookie scale contracts to first-round draft picks.
- A second-round draft pick can accept a required tender, which is a one-year contract that teams are required to offer in order to retain their rights to the player.
- A restricted free agent can accept a qualifying offer from his previous team.
- A restricted free agent finishing the fourth season of his rookie scale contract can accept a maximum qualifying offer. The actual amount is not determined until the end of the moratorium.
- Teams may sign players to contracts of one or two years for the minimum salary.
- Teams may sign players to two-way contracts, convert a two-way contract to a standard NBA contract, or convert a standard NBA contract with an Exhibit 10 bonus to a two-way contract

During the moratorium, teams are restricted from commenting on deals. Teams and players can reach verbal agreements, but they are not binding. Contracts can be signed once the moratorium ends. In 2015, DeAndre Jordan had reached a verbal agreement to sign with the Dallas Mavericks, but changed his mind at the end of the moratorium and re-signed with the Los Angeles Clippers. A year later, the moratorium period was shortened from 10 to 5 days in what was unofficially called the "DeAndre Jordan Rule". The change was intended to discourage parties from backing out of their agreements.

=== Cap holds ===
The end of a free agent's contract does not remove him from a team's cap calculations. During the free agency period (from July 1 until the player signs with a team, or the free agent's former team renounces its rights), each free agent carries a specified salary cap charge for his last team, most often called a "cap hold". Normally, the cap hold can be no more than a player's maximum salary, or less than his minimum salary, based on years of service. The only exception is for free agents who made the minimum salary in the previous season; if the league reimbursed the team for a portion of his salary in the last season of his contract, the reimbursement is not counted in the cap hold. Apart from these restrictions, the cap hold varies based on the status of the free agent and his salary in the previous season:

- Bird free agent:
  - If not coming off a rookie scale contract, and salary was at or above the estimated average salary, (Note: Average player salaries for a season are not determined until the NBA completes its annual audit in July. Because the free agency period starts before the actual average salary for the just-finished season is available, the league uses an "estimated average salary", fixed in the CBA at 104.5% of the most recent audited average salary (from one season before the just-finished one), to determine cap holds, Early Bird exception amounts, and salaries for reinstated players until the audited numbers become available.) 150% of previous salary.
  - If not coming off a rookie scale contract, and salary was below the estimated average salary, 190% of previous salary.
  - If coming off the fourth season of a rookie scale contract, and salary was at or above the estimated average salary, 250% of previous salary.
  - If coming off the fourth season of a rookie scale contract, and salary was below the estimated average salary, 300% of previous salary.
  - If coming off the third season of a rookie scale contract, the maximum amount that the team can pay under the Bird exception.
- Early Bird:
  - If coming off the second season of a rookie scale contract, the maximum amount that the team can pay under the Bird exception.
  - Otherwise, 130% of previous salary.
- Non-Bird: 120% of previous salary.

The 2017 CBA increases some cap holds from those found in the 2011 CBA as follows:

- Unsigned first-round draft picks: 120% of rookie scale (up from 100%)
- Bird free agent (as of the 2018–19 season):
  - If coming off the fourth season of a rookie scale contract, and salary was at or above the estimated average salary, 250% of previous salary (up from 200%).
  - If coming off the fourth season of a rookie scale contract, and salary was below the estimated average salary, 300% of previous salary (up from 250%).

== Sign and trade agreements ==
When a team is willing to sign an upcoming free agent, but the player's current team wants something in return, it might be in the best interest of both clubs to execute a sign-and-trade deal. This occurs when one team signs one of its free agents and immediately trades that player to another team. A sign-and-trade is beneficial to both the player and the teams; the player receives a bigger contract than he might ordinarily get from a team that he would like to play for, while the trading club gets something in return for a free agent, and the recipient of the trade gets the player they desire. Sign-and-trades are a reality in the NBA because of the CBA's rules: unlike baseball or the NFL, where teams losing free agents are compensated with draft picks or cash, NBA teams that lose free agents receive no compensation.

When a team initiates a sign-and-trade agreement, it must trade the signed player immediately; teams cannot renege on the arrangement and keep the player for themselves, using the other team's financial situation to leverage the signee into a more favorable deal for themselves. Also, the contract signed before the trade must be for at least 3 years, with the first year guaranteed. Because of the contract length requirement, the signing team cannot use an exception that cannot be used to offer a contract of 3 or more years.

Since the 2011 CBA, the signed player must have been on the roster of his previous team at the end of the last regular season. Previous agreements allowed teams to sign-and-trade any player to whom they held Bird rights, which do not automatically disappear with a player's retirement—for example, in July 2010, the Los Angeles Lakers still held Bird rights to John Salley, who had not played since 2000. In the 2007–08 season, two teams used sign-and-trades on players who had been out of the league. The Dallas Mavericks signed Keith Van Horn out of retirement as part of a package to acquire Jason Kidd, and the Lakers did the same with Aaron McKie to facilitate their deal for Pau Gasol.

The 2011 CBA put further restrictions on sign-and-trades, with these restrictions maintained in the 2017 and 2023 CBAs. Since the 2013–14 season, the payroll of the receiving team cannot exceed the so-called "apron" (as of 2017–18 set at $6 million above the tax line; this became the first tax apron for 2023–24 and beyond) as a result of the trade, and a team that has used the taxpayers' MLE cannot receive a player in a sign-and-trade in that season. Additionally, the apron becomes a hard salary cap for the first season after the signing. Teams above the apron before the trade cannot receive a player unless the trade leaves the team below the apron.

== Trading and the salary cap ==
- Teams below the salary cap may trade without regard to salary, as long as they don't end up more than $100,000 above the cap following a trade.
- Teams above the cap (or teams below the cap but would end up more than $100,000 over the cap following a trade) cannot acquire more than 125% plus $100,000 of the salary they trade away. Under the 2011 CBA, teams that remain below the luxury tax threshold even after the trade can acquire the lesser of 150% plus $100,000, or 100% plus $5 million, of the salary they trade away. There is no lower limit—teams may divest themselves of as much salary as they wish (or can convince another team to take on) in a trade.
- No free agent signed in the offseason can be traded until December 15 of that year or until three months have passed (whichever comes later), a rule that prevents teams from signing free agents with the intent of using them strictly as trade fodder. For draft picks this moratorium lasts 30 days.
- If teams acquire a player in a trade, they are allowed to trade that player straight-up for another individual player immediately. However, if teams wish to package that player with another and trade for a more expensive player, they must wait 60 days before doing so.

The tight salary-matching rules of the 2005 CBA often required what NBA cap analyst Larry Coon called "trade ballast"—extra players added to a deal solely for salary matching, who would typically be waived by their new teams. Under that CBA, such players were restricted from rejoining their original teams for 30 days during the season or 20 days in the offseason. This led to what Coon called "wink-wink deals where players are traded with the full expectation of returning later." A notable example of such a deal occurred in the 2009–10 season, in which the Cleveland Cavaliers included Zydrunas Ilgauskas in their trade with the Washington Wizards for Antawn Jamison. Ilgauskas was waived a week later without ever appearing in a game for the Wizards, and re-signed with Cleveland after the 30-day waiting period passed. Since the 2011 CBA, a player acquired in a trade and waived by his new team cannot re-sign with his original team until one year after the trade or July 1 after the expiration of his contract, whichever is sooner.

=== Base year compensation ===
Certain players in the first few months of a new contract are subject to base year compensation (BYC). The intent of BYC is to prevent teams from re-signing players to salaries specifically targeted to match other salaries in a trade (in other words, salary should be based on basketball value, not trade value). A BYC player's trade value as outgoing salary is 50% of his new salary, or his previous salary, whichever is greater. BYC applies only to players who re-sign with their previous team and receive a raise greater than 20%. It also applies only when (and as long as) the team is over the salary cap. Since the 2011 CBA, players subject to BYC cannot be traded before January 15 except in a sign-and-trade, and BYC is only applied to outgoing salary in sign-and-trade deals.

== Waivers ==
NBA teams can release a player to the waiver wire, where he can stay for 48 hours (during the regular season). While he is on waivers, other teams may claim him, for his existing salary. If he is not claimed, he is said to have "cleared waivers", and is treated like any free agent, able to sign with any team (with the special restriction noted above for players who were traded and then waived).

Players waived after March 1 are not eligible to be on a team's playoff roster. The deadline was March 23 during the lockout-shortened 2011–12 season.

== Released players ==
Released/waived players with guaranteed contracts continue to be included in their former team's payroll. Players whose contracts are guaranteed are included in team salary in the amount they made while they were with the team. Players on non-guaranteed "summer contracts" are not included in team salary unless they make the regular season roster.

If another team signs a released player who had a guaranteed contract (as long as the player has cleared waivers), the player's original team is allowed to reduce the amount of money they still owe the player (and lower their team payroll) by the right of set-off. This is true if the player signs with any professional team—it does not even have to be an NBA team. The amount the original team gets to set off is limited to one-half the difference between the player's new salary and a pro-rated share of the minimum salary for a one-year veteran (if the player is a rookie, then the rookie minimum is used instead).

=== Stretch provision ===
Both the 2005 and 2011 CBAs contained a so-called "stretch" provision regarding the payment of guaranteed money to waived players and its effect on the salary cap; the 2011 provisions were kept in the 2017 CBA.

Under the 2005 CBA, players and teams could alter the schedule of payments to waived players by mutual agreement. The remaining guaranteed salary was equally spread across the remaining years of the player's contract.

The 2011 CBA dramatically changed this regime. While contracts signed under the 2005 CBA remained under the original scheme, different rules apply to contracts signed since the 2011 CBA went into effect. Today, when a team waives a player, it can spread the remaining guaranteed salary (and its accompanying cap hit) over twice the remaining length of the contract, plus one year. According to Coon, "if a team has an underperforming player with one season remaining at $12 million, the team can waive him and stretch his salary across three seasons at $4 million per season."

== Amnesty clause ==
The NBA Amnesty Clause provided franchises a means of escaping a contractual obligation to a player whose performance falls far short of the extremely large salary they initially agreed to pay him.

Under the 2005 CBA, one player could be waived prior to the start of the 2005–06 season and not count toward the luxury tax. Unlike the 2011 CBA, the player still counted under the salary cap. The 2005 amnesty provision was derisively named the "Allan Houston Rule", but his team, the New York Knicks, did not actually use the measure on Houston—they instead applied it to Jerome Williams because Allan Houston later retired for medical reasons the same season. Jerome Williams retired from the NBA just two days after being waived under the amnesty clause.

Under the 2011 Collective Bargaining Agreement (CBA), each franchise was allowed to waive one player prior to the start of any season between the 2011–12 and 2015–16 seasons. The remaining salary still contractually owed was not included in the salary cap or luxury tax totals of the team terminating his employment. Only players signed prior to the 2011–12 season could be "amnestied," and the clause could be exercised during the seven days following the NBA's July moratorium period on player transactions. (Note: For the 2011–12 season, that period was December 9–16, 2011, due to the delayed start of the season after the lockout.) The clause's provisions allowed a rival team to claim an amnestied player at a significantly (often, dramatically) reduced salary; the waiving team only had to pay the player the remaining balance. The team with the highest bid would acquire the player; if unclaimed, the player would become a free agent. Teams over the salary cap could only acquire an amnestied player if he became a free agent, and the offer would be limited to the veteran's minimum contract.

Season	Season the amnesty clause was exercised.
Team	Team that exercised the clause.
Player	Player that was amnestied by the team.
Next team	The team the player joined after being amnestied.
Bid amount	The bid amount used by the next team if the player was claimed off waivers. All unclaimed players become free agents.
*	Denotes the team claimed the player off waivers (i.e. he was not a free agent).
—N/a	Denotes the player was not selected to join a new team (i.e. retirement) and/or was not bid on.

Players amnestied under the 2005 CBA
Season	Team	Player	Ref
2005–06	Dallas Mavericks	Michael Finley	
2005–06	Los Angeles Lakers	Brian Grant	
2005–06	Portland Trail Blazers	Derek Anderson	
2005–06	Orlando Magic	Doug Christie	
2005–06	New York Knicks	Jerome Williams	
2005–06	Milwaukee Bucks	Calvin Booth	
2005–06	Houston Rockets	Clarence Weatherspoon	
2005–06	Philadelphia 76ers	Aaron McKie	
2005–06	Indiana Pacers	Reggie Miller	
2005–06	Toronto Raptors	Alonzo Mourning	
2005–06	Boston Celtics	Vin Baker	
2005–06	Phoenix Suns	Howard Eisley	
2005–06	Chicago Bulls	Eddie Robinson	
2005–06	Detroit Pistons	Derrick Coleman	
2005–06	Minnesota Timberwolves	Fred Hoiberg	
2005–06	New Jersey Nets	Ron Mercer	
2005–06	Miami Heat	Wesley Person	
2005–06	Memphis Grizzlies	Troy Bell	

Players amnestied under the 2011 CBA
Season	Team	Player	Next team	Bid amount	Ref
2011–12	Orlando Magic	Gilbert Arenas	Memphis Grizzlies	—N/a	
2011–12	Golden State Warriors	Charlie Bell	(Italy) Juvecaserta Basket	—N/a	
2011–12	New York Knicks	Chauncey Billups	Los Angeles Clippers*	$2,000,032	
2011–12	Cleveland Cavaliers	Baron Davis	New York Knicks	—N/a	
2011–12	New Jersey Nets	Travis Outlaw	Sacramento Kings*	$12,000,000	
2011–12	Indiana Pacers	James Posey	—N/a (Retired) (Note: Posey retired from the NBA before he could find another team that he could play for. He became an assistant coach for the Canton Charge in the D-League in the 2013–14 season.)	—N/a	
2011–12	Portland Trail Blazers	Brandon Roy	Minnesota Timberwolves (Note: Roy initially retired from basketball due to persistent knee injuries and was then amnestied by Portland. However, after a year of inactivity, he returned to the NBA.)	—N/a	
2012–13	Philadelphia 76ers	Elton Brand	Dallas Mavericks*	$2,100,000	
2012–13	Minnesota Timberwolves	Darko Miličić	Boston Celtics	—N/a	
2012–13	Dallas Mavericks	Brendan Haywood	Charlotte Bobcats*	$2,000,500	
2012–13	Houston Rockets	Luis Scola	Phoenix Suns*	$13,500,000	
2012–13	Phoenix Suns	Josh Childress	Brooklyn Nets	—N/a	
2012–13	Washington Wizards	Andray Blatche	Brooklyn Nets	—N/a	
2012–13	Denver Nuggets	Chris Andersen	Miami Heat	—N/a	
2012–13	Los Angeles Clippers	Ryan Gomes	(Germany) Artland Dragons	—N/a	
2013–14	Los Angeles Lakers	Metta World Peace	New York Knicks	—N/a	
2013–14	Charlotte Bobcats	Tyrus Thomas	Iowa Energy	—N/a	
2013–14	Milwaukee Bucks	Drew Gooden	Washington Wizards	—N/a	
2013–14	Toronto Raptors	Linas Kleiza	(Turkey) Fenerbahçe Ülker	—N/a	
2013–14	Miami Heat	Mike Miller	Memphis Grizzlies	—N/a	
2014–15	Chicago Bulls	Carlos Boozer	Los Angeles Lakers*	$3,200,000	
