= Wreck Racing =

Automotive racing team of Georgia Tech

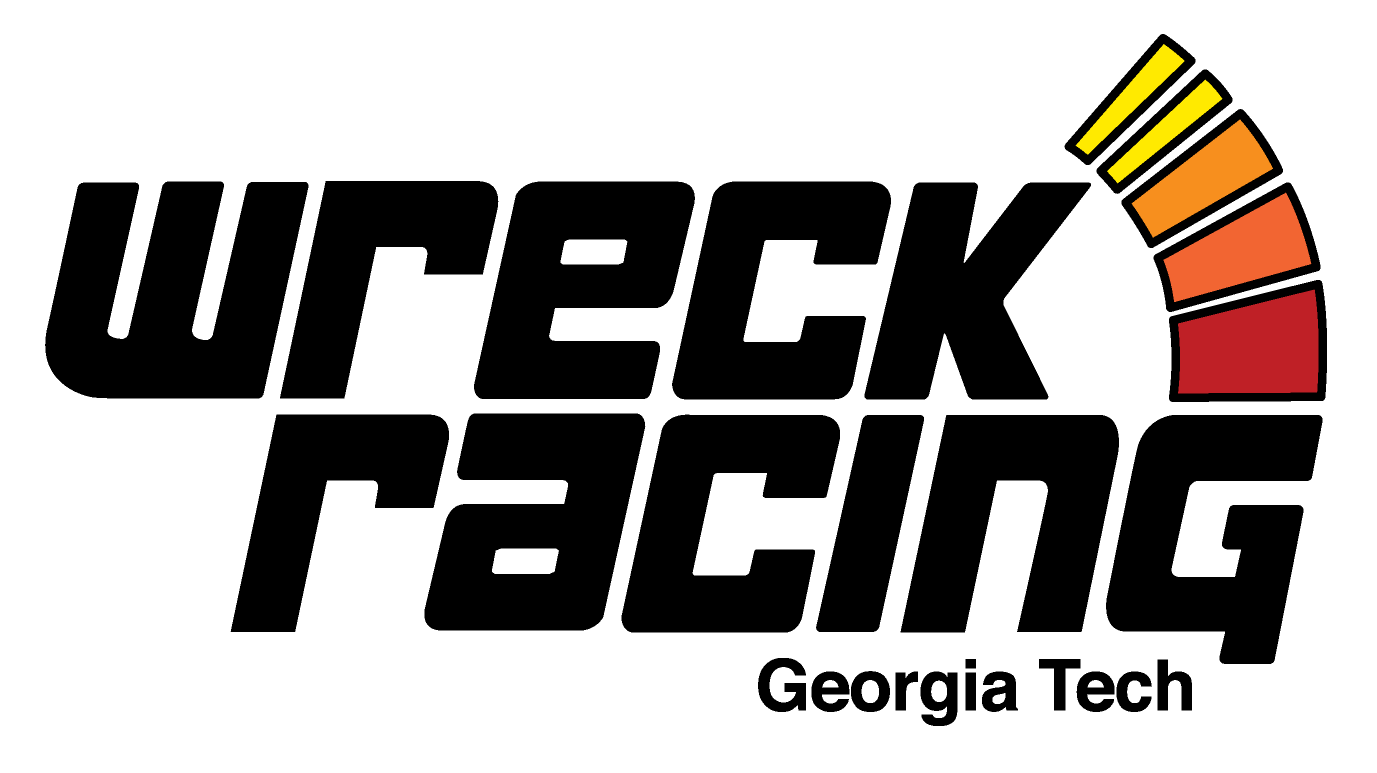
Wreck Racing Logo

Wreck Racing is a Georgia Tech automotive competition team, based in the Woodruff School of Mechanical Engineering. The team is composed of undergraduate and graduate students from the various schools within Georgia Tech and is based in the Student Competition Center on the North edge of Tech's Atlanta campus. The team's main focus is in the design, fabrication, testing, and racing of production-based sports cars. Wreck Racing primarily competes in the Grassroots Motorsports Annual Challenge, but also has competed in local SCCA and BMWCCA events.

== History ==
The Wreck Racing team was founded by Andrew Sullivan and Andy Powell, both Tech Alumni, and has been an officially chartered student organization since 2004. Since the team was founded, membership has grown rapidly, and the team currently has approximately 75 active members.

== Competition ==
Since 2005 Wreck Racing has competed in the annual GRM $20XX event and has competed with eight separate vehicles including a 1980s VW GTI, a turbocharged E30 chassis BMW, a V8-powered Mazda Miata, a 2JZ MG Midget, a mid-engine Honda Insight, a V8 swapped BMW E28, a mid-engine Chevrolet S-10, and a Honda powered Factory Five 818.

$2010 Challenge: In 2010 Wreck Racing won the GRM $2010 Challenge, placing 1st overall, 1st in autocross, and 1st in concours, placing above many veteran teams and entries by several professional race shops.

$2017 Challenge: Wreck Racing won 1st place in autocross, 1st place in concours, and 1st place overall in the Grassroot Motorsports $2017 Challenge with their 2001 Honda Insight powered by a mid-mounted Subaru EG33 engine.

$2020 Challenge: Wreck Racing won 1st place in autocross, 2nd place in Concours d'Elegance, 5th place in drag, and 1st place overall in the Grassroot Motorsports $2020 Challenge with their V8 powered BMW E28.

== Education ==
Another primary focus of Wreck Racing is to fortify scientific design and analysis methods taught in the Georgia Tech classrooms through practical application. The team frequently utilizes finite element and signal analysis, circuit design, CAD modeling and drawing, thermodynamic and fluid dynamic analysis, along with advanced fabrication techniques, such as state-of-the-art CNC milling, radiator fin augmentation, waterjet and plasma cutting, lathe operation, welding, and precision measuring with the goal of producing exceptional vehicle performance while remaining within the severe budget and time restrictions mandated by the competition rules.
