= Koontz House =

Koontz House may refer to:

- Kinter K. Koontz House, Phoenix, Arizona
- Koontz House, Natchez, Mississippi, listed on the NRHP and more commonly known as Green Leaves
- James H. and Cynthia Koontz House, Echo, Oregon, listed on the NRHP and also known as Koontz House

== See also ==
- J. H. Koontz Building, Echo, Oregon, listed on the National Register of Historic Places listings in Umatilla County, Oregon
