= George W. Woodruff School of Mechanical Engineering =

G.W. Woodruff School of Mechanical Engineering
- Type: Public
- Established: October 13, 1885
- Endowment: $67,635,999
- Chair: Devesh Ranjan
- Academic staff: 92
- Administrative staff: 55
- Students: 2488
- Undergraduates: 1765
- Postgraduates: 723
- Location: Atlanta, Georgia, United States; 33°46′37″N 84°24′02″W
- Campus: Urban
- Website: http://www.me.gatech.edu

The George W. Woodruff School of Mechanical Engineering is the oldest and second largest department in the College of Engineering at the Georgia Institute of Technology. The school offers degree programs in mechanical engineering and nuclear and radiological engineering that are accredited by ABET. In its 2019 ranking list, U.S. News & World Report placed the school ranks 2nd in undergraduate mechanical engineering, 5th in graduate mechanical engineering, and 9th in graduate nuclear and radiological engineering.

The school took its present name in 1985, honoring George W. Woodruff (class of 1917), a major benefactor.

The school is the only academic institution to be recognized as a Mechanical Engineering Heritage Site by the American Society of Mechanical Engineers.

== Degrees offered ==
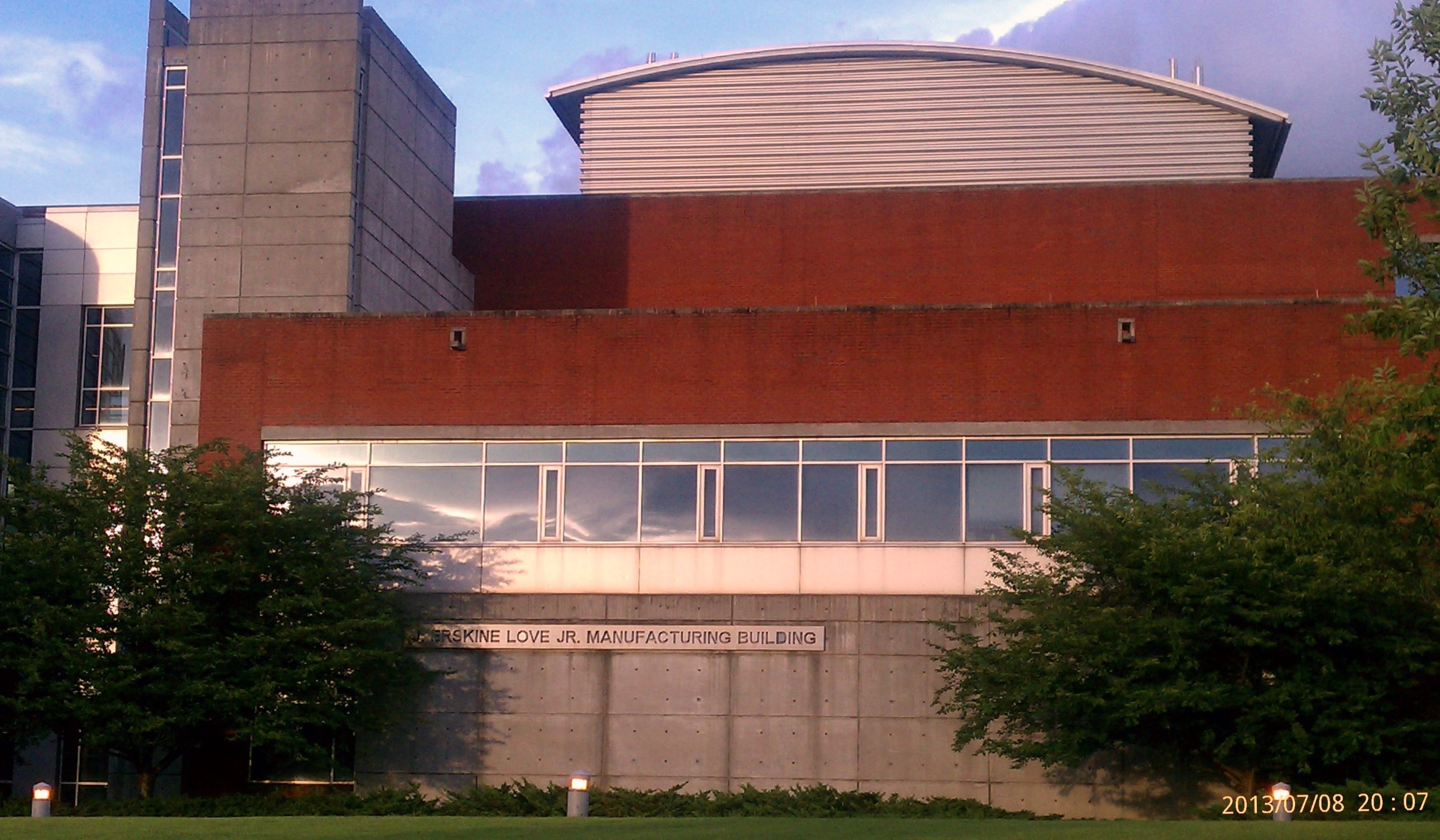
J. Erskine Love Jr. Manufacturing Building

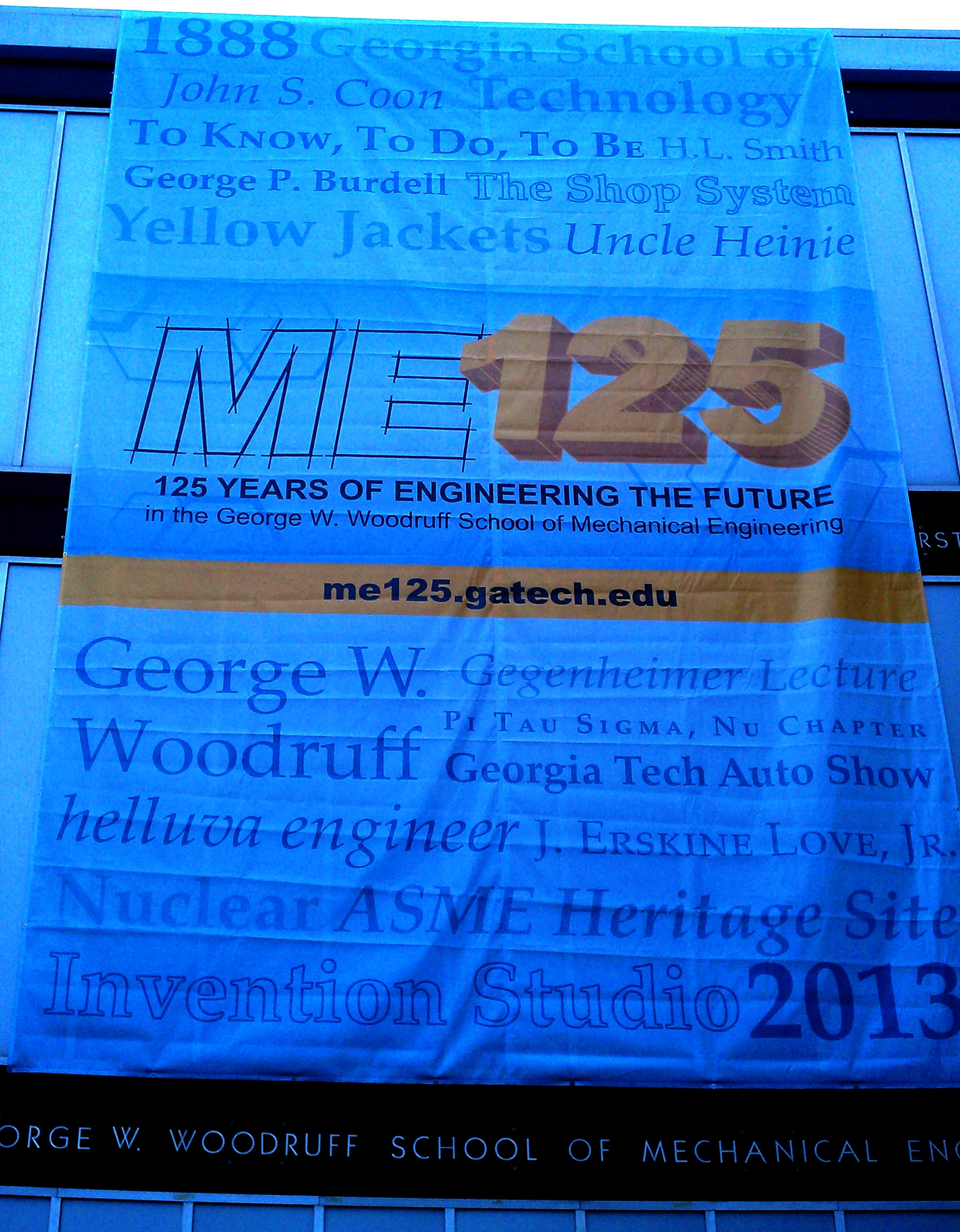
125 Year Anniversary Banner

The G. W. Woodruff School offers two undergraduate degrees, five graduate degrees, and four post-graduate degrees.

- BS: Mechanical Engineering
- BS: Nuclear and Radiological Engineering
- MS: Mechanical Engineering
- MS: Nuclear Engineering
- MS: Medical Physics
- MS: Paper Science & Engineering
- MS: Bioengineering
- PhD: with a Major in Mechanical Engineering
- PhD: with a Major in Nuclear and Radiological Engineering
- PhD: with a Major in Bioengineering
- PhD: with a Major in Paper Science & Engineering

== Facilities ==
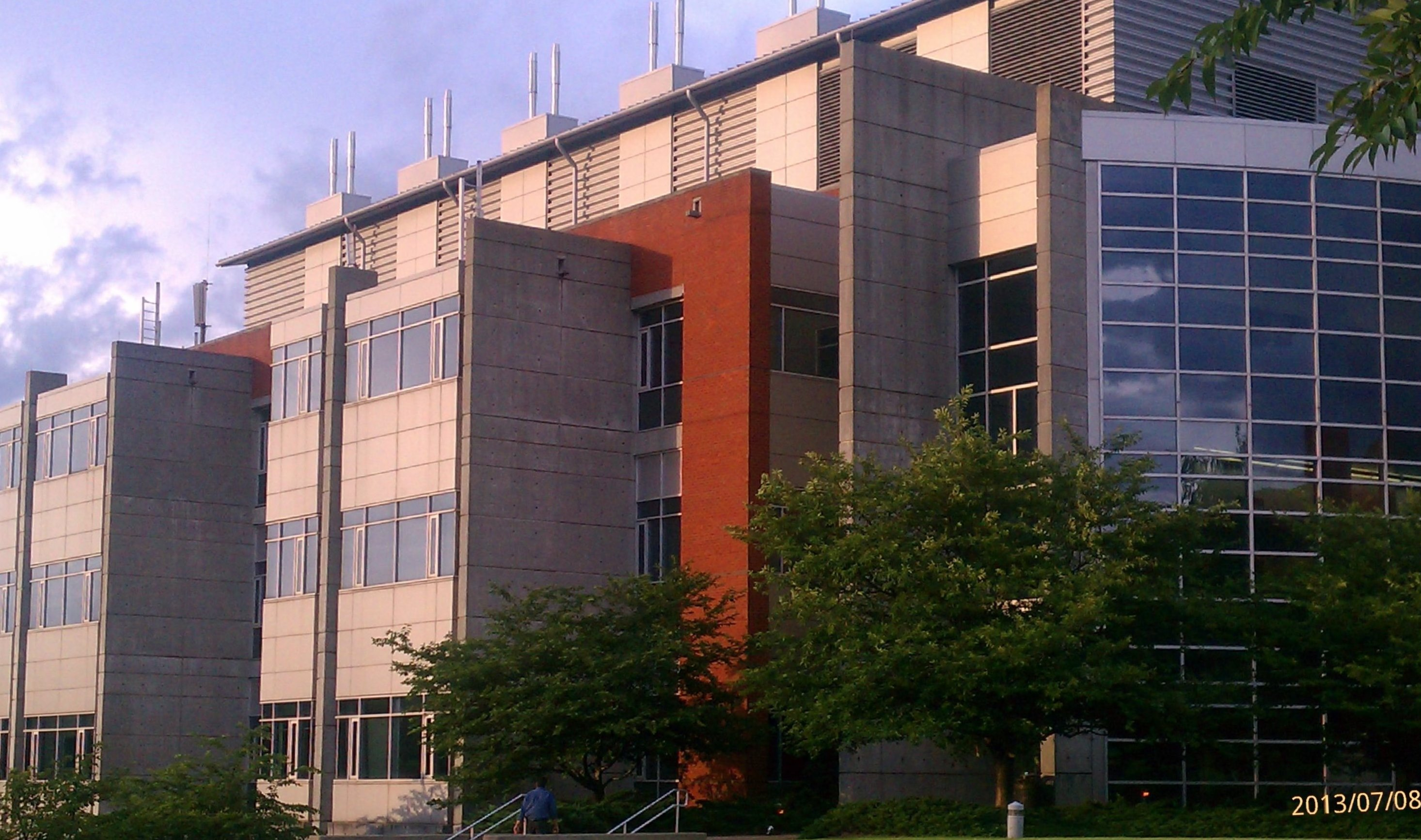
The J. Erskine Love Jr. Manufacturing Building

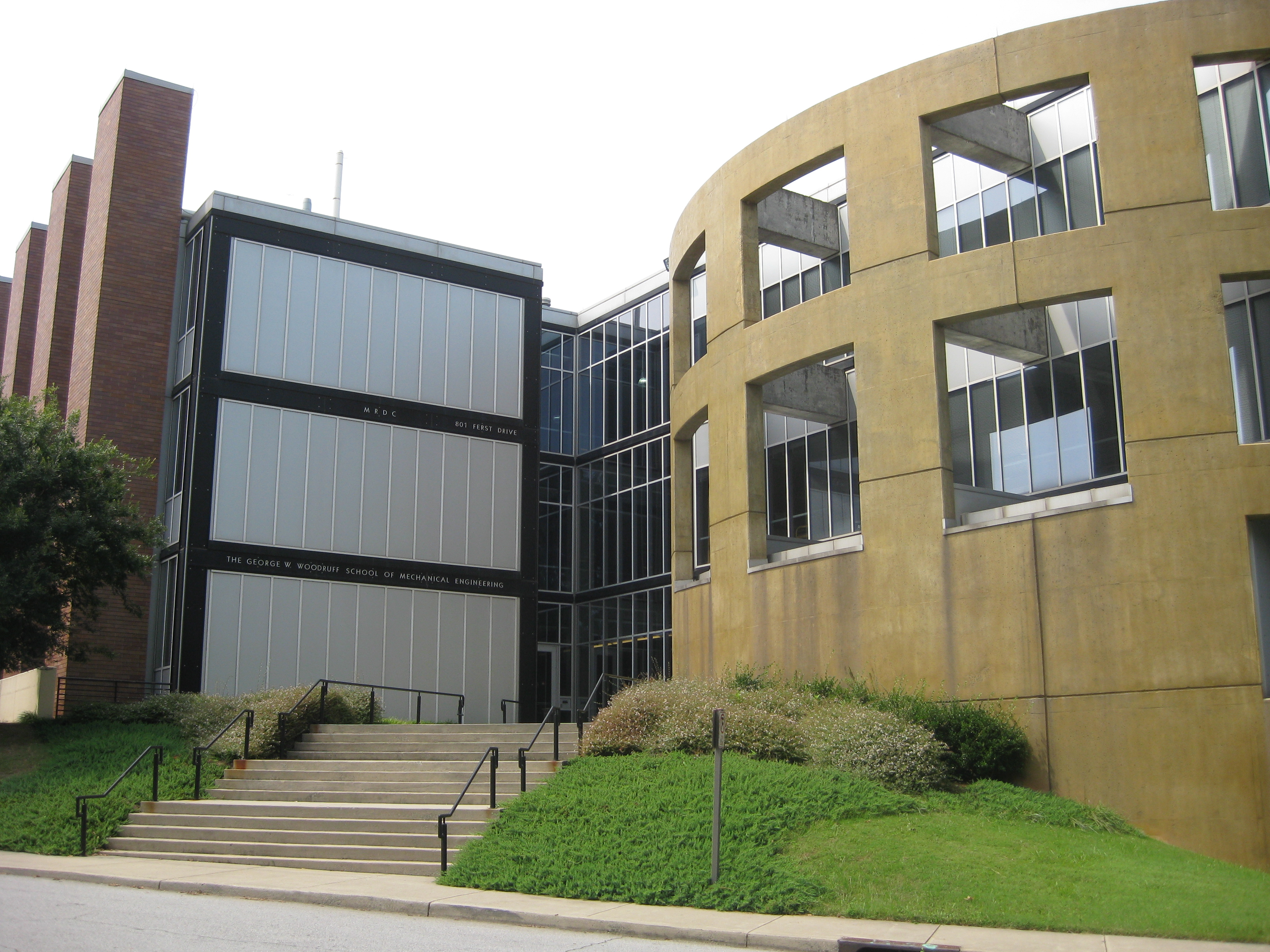
Manufacturing Related Disciplines Complex (MRDC)

The G.W. Woodruff School occupies eight buildings, most of which are located in west campus.

- Fuller E. Callaway Jr. Manufacturing Research Center (MARC)
  - Integrated Acoustics Laboratory (anechoic-chamber)
  - Manufacturing, CAE/Design, and Automation/ Mechatronics research groups
- Manufacturing Related Disciplines Complex (MRDC)
  - Tribology and Mechanics of Materials research groups
  - Student machine shops including "Invention Studio"
- J. Erskine Love Jr. Manufacturing Building (MRDC II)
  - Underwater acoustics tank, wind tunnel, and MEMS clean room
  - Acoustics, Fluid Mechanics, Heat Transfer, and MEMS research groups
- Frank H. Neely Research Center
  - Nuclear and Radiological Engineering/Medical Physics program
  - Fission, Fusion, and Medical Physics research groups
- Parker H. Petit Biotechnology Building
  - Bioengineering research group
- Institute of Paper Science and Technology
  - Heat Transfer research group
  - Robert C. Williams Museum of Papermaking
- IPST Centennial Engineering Building
- Student Competition Center (Tin Building)
  - Houses various student competition groups, including GT motorsports, GT Off-Road (the SAE-baja team), Robojackets and Wreck Racing

== See also ==
- John Saylor Coon
- J. Brandon Dixon
- Julie Linsey
- Ankur Singh
