= Srinivas Garimella =

Indian mechanical engineer

Srinivas Garimella is an Indian mechanical engineer. He is a professor in the George W. Woodruff School of Mechanical Engineering at Georgia Institute of Technology.

== Education and career ==
Garimella earned a Bachelor of Science from IIT Kanpur in 1982, then moved to the United States to pursue graduate studies at Ohio State University, where he completed a Master's of Science and Ph.D. in 1984 and 1990, respectively. Garimella worked in industry for General Motors and Battelle Memorial Institute before turning to academia. He taught at Western Michigan University from 1994 then moved to Iowa State University in 1998. At Iowa State, Garimella became the first holder of the William and Virginia Binger Associate Professorship in Mechanical Engineering in 2000, and was awarded tenure in 2001. He joined the Georgia Institute of Technology in August 2003. Garimella holds the Hightower Chair in Engineering within the George W. Woodruff School of Mechanical Engineering.

== Awards and honors ==
Garimella was elected a fellow of the American Society of Mechanical Engineers in 2005.
