= Ankur Singh =

American scientist

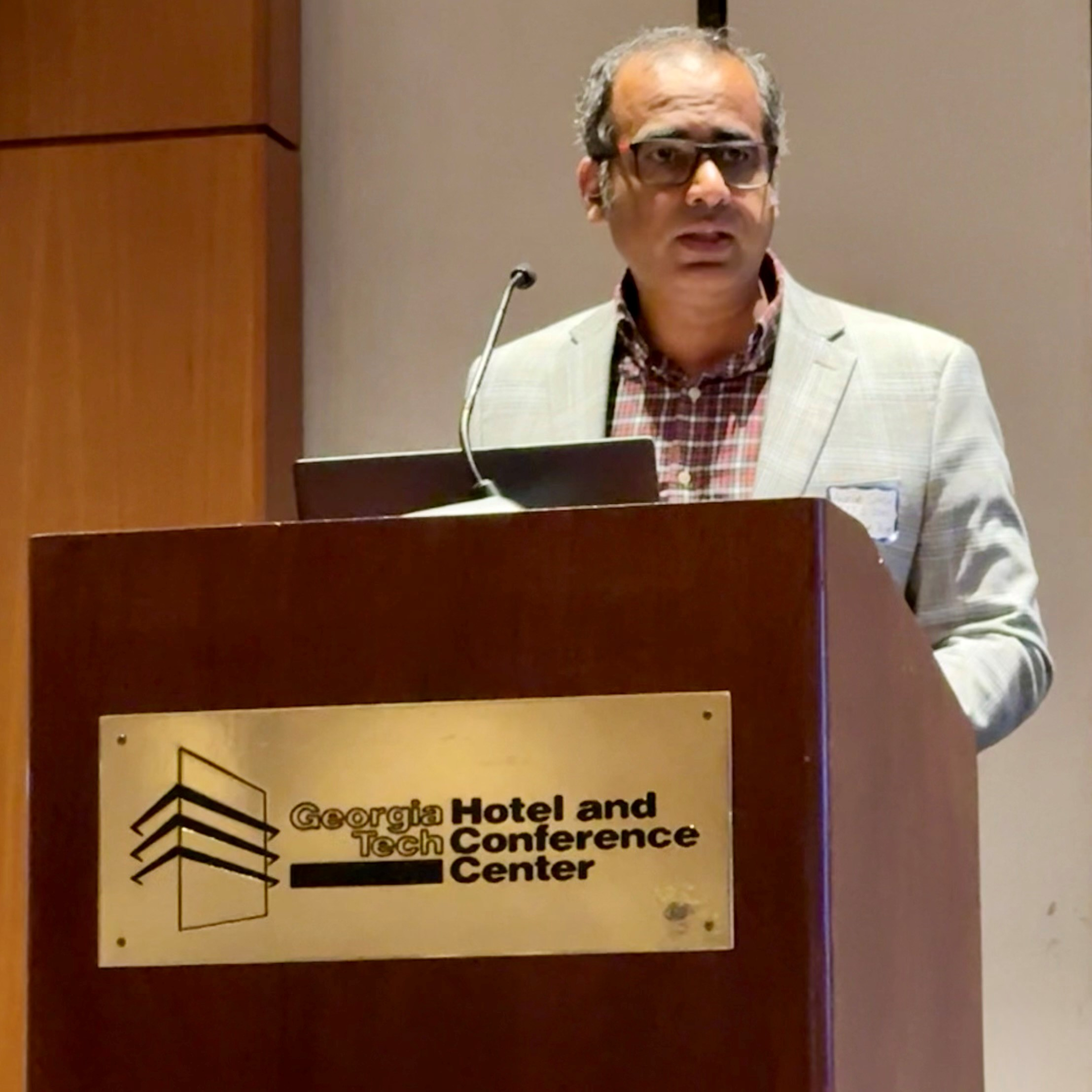
- Born: Varanasi, India
- Employer: Georgia Institute of Technology Cornell University
- Known for: Human Immune Organoids, Biomaterials, Lymphoma and Cancer Technologies
- Title: Carl Ring Family Professor

Academic background
- Education: Georgia Institute of Technology; The University of Texas at Austin; Indian Institute of Technology Bombay

Academic work
- Discipline: Biomedical engineering
- Sub-discipline: Immune and tissue engineering, nanomaterials and biomaterials, vaccines

Ankur Singh (Hindi: अंकुर सिंह) is an Indian-American biomedical engineer and scientist whose research focuses on engineering immune system. He is a Carl Ring Family Endowed Professor at Georgia Institute of Technology in the George W. Woodruff School of Mechanical Engineering and Wallace H. Coulter Department of Biomedical Engineering. He serves as the director of the Center for Immunoengineering at Georgia Tech.

== Education and work ==
Singh completed his PhD in Biomedical Engineering at The University of Texas at Austin in 2010, working with leading biomedical scientist, Krishnendu Roy, now Dean of Engineering at Vanderbilt University. His doctoral thesis focused on bioengineered immunotherapy where he led the development of an injectable, in situ crosslinkable hydrogel - microparticle vaccine formulation to attract dendritic cells to the site of injection and bias T cell immune response against infection and lymphoma cancer. The combinatorial vaccine was among the early works to demonstrate the co-delivery of chemoattractants, DNA, and siRNA to the same immune cell.

Singh immigrated to the United States in 2006 following a Master of Technology in biomedical engineering from the Indian Institute of Technology-Bombay, and a Bachelor of Engineering in biochemical engineering from Kumaon University, India. His master's thesis at IIT-Bombay focused on studying lipid nanoparticles for cancer treatment, working with Rinti Banerjee.

Singh completed his postdoctoral training with bioengineering pioneer Andrés J. García and was co-advised by stem cell expert Todd McDevitt at Georgia Institute of Technology (2010–2013). His postdoctoral research, reported in Nature Methods, developed a first microfluidics platform for adhesion strength–based, label-free isolation of human induced pluripotent stem cells. This work was featured by the director of National Institute of Health, Francis Collins, in his NIH Director's blog. Singh then joined Cornell University as an assistant professor from 2013 to 2019, and was promoted to associate professor with tenure in 2019. In 2020, he transitioned to the Georgia Institute of Technology, where he was an Associate Professor until 2023, after which he was promoted to professor of Mechanical Engineering and Biomedical Engineering, a position he currently holds. In 2024, Singh was appointed as the Carl Ring Family endowed professor of mechanical engineering.

Singh is a pioneering researcher and inventor in the field of immune organoids, a discipline he has advanced and established as a significant area of scholarly research. His work has established a first synthetic immune organ to understand healthy and diseased immune cells and translate therapeutics. His research focuses on developing biomaterials-engineered "living" immune tissues, such as organoids and on-chip models, to replicate the structural and functional features of lymph nodes. By applying engineering principles, he investigates the cellular and biophysical interactions between lymphoid tissues, immune cells, and tumors. His laboratory explores how immune cells make decisions at the cellular, molecular, and epigenetic levels to enhance protection against infections, cancer, and inflammation. Singh has published more than 75 journal articles, 15 issued/pending patents, and more than 95 Keynote and invited talks. Singh has published extensively in the area of immune engineering, biomaterials, hydrogels, nanotechnology, and lymphoma. His work has been published in leading peer-reviewed journals, including Nature Methods, Nature Materials, Nature Nanotechnology, Nature Immunology, Nature Communications, Nature Reviews Materials, and Nature Protocols. His immune organoids were identified among the Top 100 Discoveries of 2015 by Discover Magazine, and were featured in The Scientist magazine, and Contagion news.

In a "News & Views" article featured in Nature Nanotechnology, immunotherapy experts Luca Gattinoni and Dragana Slavkovic-Lukic compared the potential impact of Singh's nanowire technology on cancer treatment to Neil Armstrong's first step on the moon, suggesting that just as that moment opened new horizons in space exploration, nanowires could revolutionize cancer treatment by advancing naïve T cell-based immunotherapy. His contributions to the development of organotypic models of lymphoma has further led to discovery that a cancerous lymphoid tumor microenvironment not only promotes lymphoma growth but also diminishes the effectiveness of molecular inhibitors. His lymphoma tumor models have helped translate lab research findings to Phase I clinical trial of Tazemetostat in combination with Venetoclax in patients with relapsed/refractory Non-Hodgkin Lymphoma. In addition, he also co-edited biomedical textbook entitled "Microscale Technologies for Cell Engineering", with Akhilesh K. Gaharwar. In 2022, Dr. Singh was nominated, reviewed, and elected by peers and members of the American Institute for Medical and Biological Engineering (AIMBE) College of Fellows "for creative integration of biomaterials development and cell manupulations exvivo/in vivo to design synthetic materials for ex vivo immune tissues," an honor reserved for the top 2% of medical and biological engineers globally.

He has received funding from the National Institute of Health, National Science Foundation, Wellcome Leap HOPE, US Department of Defense, Defense Threat Reduction Agency, and the Curci Foundation. In 2021, Singh was selected by Wellcome Leap HOPE, a global Advanced Research Projects Agency for Health, to lead a team of researchers from the Georgia Institute of Technology and Emory University, as part of the nonprofit's international $50 million Human Organs, Physiology, and Engineering (HOPE) program. Singh is an associate editor of scientific journals Science Advances, Biomaterials, and Cellular and Molecular Bioengineering. He serves on the Executive Advisory Board of Advanced NanoBiomed Research, and served as an Associate Scientific Advisor for Science Translational Medicine for 2018-2019, where he wrote editor's choice articles.

Singh is known for his commitment to fostering a collaborative learning environment and encouraging students to engage in interdisciplinary research. He teaches a variety of courses related to fundamentals of biomedical engineering to specialized courses in biomaterials, biofluid mechanics, tissue engineering, and immunoengineering. For his pedagogy, he has received Georgia Tech Student Recognition of Excellence in Teaching Award (2023) and John Swanson '61 ME Teaching Excellence Award from Cornell Engineering (2017). An advocate of work-life balance in academic career, in 2024 Singh shared with Nature how he is thriving in academia and what fuels his passion for it.

== Awards ==
- 2022: Fellow of American Institute for Medical and Biological Engineering
- 2022: Society for Biomaterials Mid Career Award
- 2017: Member of the National Academy of Engineering EU-US Frontiers of Engineering (EU-US FOE)
- 2017: Department of Defense Congressionally Directed Medical Research Programs Career Award
- 2017: Society for Biomaterials Young Investigator Award
- 2016: US National Science Foundation CAREER Award (DMR: BMAT)
