= Koons =

- Pronunciation: /kuːnz/
- Language: English

Koons is a surname. Notable people with the surname include:

== People ==
- Benjamin F. Koons (1844–1903), American academic administrator
- Jeff Koons (born 1955), American artist
- Darell Koons (1924–2016), American painter
- Harry Koons (1862–1932), American baseball player
- Robert C. Koons, American philosopher

== See also ==
- Rogers v. Koons, a leading U.S. court case on copyright, dealing with the fair use defense for parody
- Koons Buick, Inc. v. Nigh, a U.S. court case about personal-property loans

== See also ==
- Coons (disambiguation)
- Koon (disambiguation)
- Koontz (disambiguation)
