= Julie Linsey =

American mechanical engineer

Julie Stahmer Linsey (born 1979) is an American mechanical engineer whose research concerns creativity in the early phases of engineering design. She is a professor in the George W. Woodruff School of Mechanical Engineering at Georgia Tech.

== Education and career ==
Linsey majored in mechanical engineering at the University of Michigan, graduating in 2001. After working for a year at Agilent Technologies, she went to the University of Texas at Austin for graduate study in mechanical engineering, earning a master's degree in 2005 and completing her Ph.D. in 2007.

She became an assistant professor at Texas A&M University in 2008, and moved to Georgia Tech in 2013. She was promoted to associate professor in 2015, and to full professor in 2021.

== Recognition ==
Linsey was the 2012 winner of the Ferdinand P. Beer and E. Russell Johnston, Jr. Outstanding New Mechanics Educator Award of the American Society for Engineering Education.
