= Student Competition Center =

Facility in Georgia, United States

Coordinates: 33.787086°N 84.406387°W

The Student Competition Center is the home of the student competition teams at Georgia Institute of Technology. These teams include GT Motorsports, GT Offroad, Solar Racing (formerly SolarJackets), RoboJackets, Wreck Racing, HyTech Racing, and the EcoCAR team. The building, operated by the George W. Woodruff School of Mechanical Engineering, provides teams with the facilities to participate in their respective competitions. The facility is located at 575 14th Street in Atlanta, Georgia, adjacent to the Georgia Tech campus.

== History ==
The original Student Competition Center was located at the center of campus in the shadow of Tech Tower, nested between the Coon, Skiles, & Weber buildings. The original facility, dubbed the "Tin Building" by students and professors, was constructed in Savannah, Georgia in 1941. The facility was used to manufacture Sherman tanks during World War II. Following the war, the structure was deconstructed and moved to the Georgia Tech campus in Atlanta in 1947. It served as laboratory space and held offices for mechanical engineering faculty until the 1990s, when the building was re-purposed to house the student competition teams that had outgrown their original meeting space in the basement of the Coon building.

The facility housed build areas and offices for each team, along with common machine tools shared by the students. The safety of the facility began to be called into question and it was regarded by some to be an eyesore. In response to these concerns, Institute President Bud Peterson met with competition team leaders early in the spring of 2010 to announce the Institute's plan to raze the building and relocate the teams to an off-campus warehouse leased by Georgia Tech. The institute planned to construct greenspace in the area occupied by the Tin Building, however a parking lot was built instead.

Facilities officials worked closely with the teams to renovate the facility that it was suited to their needs. The institute paid for all construction and moving expenses, totaling in excess of $1million. The new off-campus competition center opened in January 2011, with more than five times the build and office space as the Tin Building. Some teams have criticized the choice by the institute to move the teams off campus, as they have experienced difficulty in acquiring new members and transporting existing members because of the relatively remote location.
