= Larry Coon =

American computer scientist

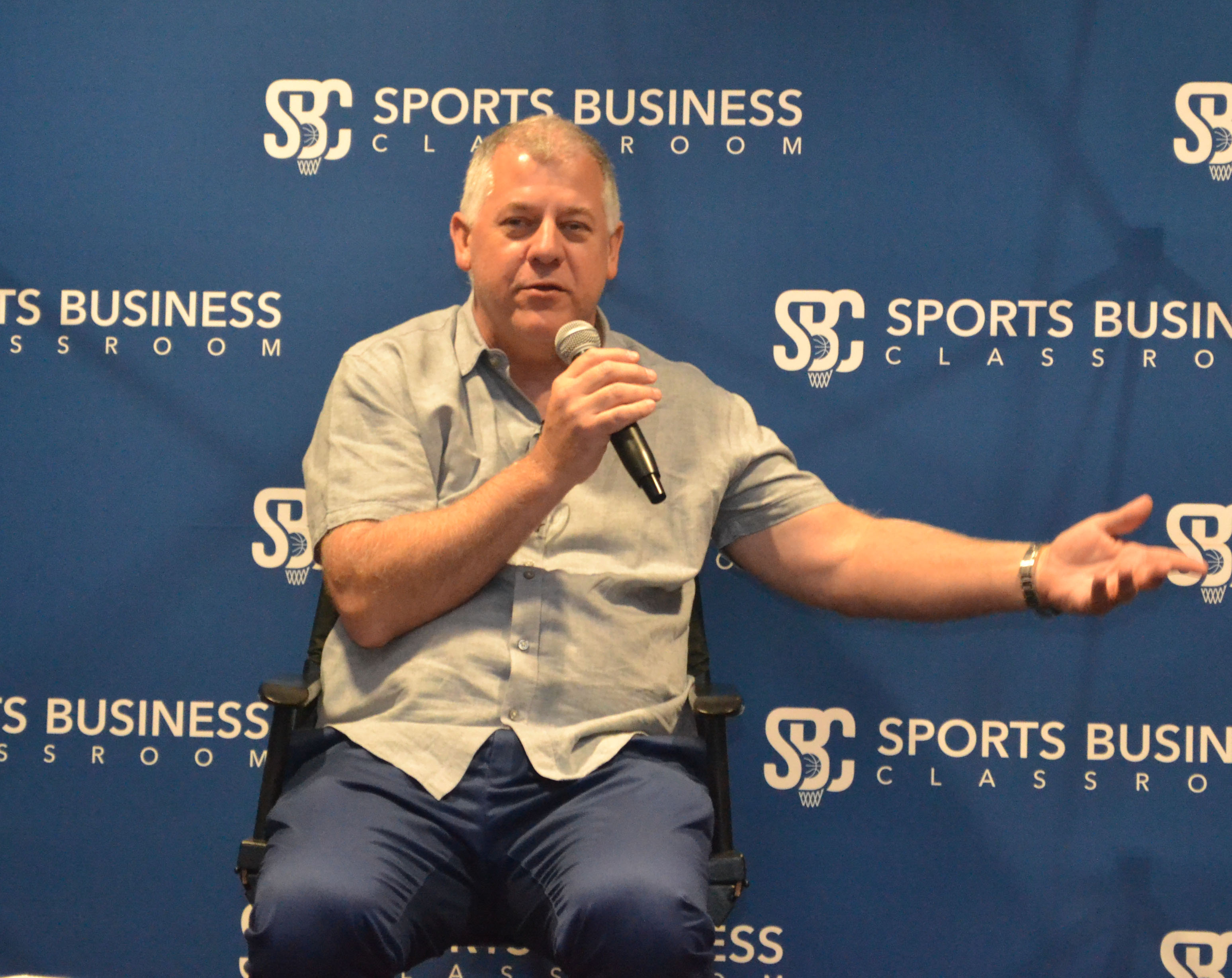
- Born: July 28, 1962 (age 64)
- Scientific career
- Fields: Computer science, National Basketball Association
- Workplaces: University of California, Irvine

Larry Coon is a retired computer scientist and information technology manager at the University of California, Irvine, who is known for his expertise on the National Basketball Association collective bargaining agreement. The New York Times writes that Coon is cited more frequently than basketball inventor James Naismith.

Coon maintains, edits and answers questions about the NBA salary cap and updates his website, CBAfaq.com, when any corrections or new information are brought to his attention. He has written for The New York Times, ESPN.com and Hoopsworld.com, makes occasional television (ESPN's Outside the Lines) and radio appearances, and frequents NBA fan forums such as RealGM.

The NBA Players Association provides the entire collective bargaining agreement (CBA) for fans to inspect, but simply links to Coon's website for users who have specific questions about the contents of the CBA. In The Book of Basketball, sportswriter Bill Simmons calls Coon an "Internet hero" for his detailed, 40,000 word site. TNT's David Aldridge lists Coon among the innovators of the Basketball Blogosphere which he called the NBA "innovation of the decade". Aldridge also lists Coon among the "power players of the 2010 free agent market".

In July 2011, Sports Illustrated named Coon to their "Twitter 100", which listed the 100 most essential people in the sports world to follow on Twitter.

Coon developed the curriculum and was the General Manager of Sports Business Classroom from 2016 through 2023. Coon and the 2016 Sports Business Classroom were featured in the Orange County Register.

Coon retired in 2024 and now focuses on building acoustic guitars.
