= Coons! Night of the Bandits of the Night =

- film poster
- Directed by: Travis Irvine
- Written by: Travis Irvine
- Produced by: Travis Irvine; Mark Lammers; Kamal Patel; Colin Scianamblo; Andrew Hamilton; Nick Lyons
- Starring: Lehr Beidelschies; Brian Kamerer; Nick Maier; Zach Riedmaier; Kasey Cooper
- Cinematography: Kamal Patel; Alexander Raghuvir
- Edited by: Travis Irvine; Matthew Lyons
- Music by: Travis Irvine; Brian Kamerer; Seth Pfannenschmidt
- Production company: Overbites Pictures
- Distributed by: Troma Entertainment
- Release date: December 30, 2005
- Running time: 82 minutes
- Country: United States
- Language: English
- Budget: $ 5,000

Coons! Night of the Bandits of the Night is a 2005 musical comedy horror satire film written and directed by Travis Irvine with a budget of $5000. The independent film is the first feature film (commercial release) from Ohio University communications undergraduate students. It premiered at film festivals and select cinemas before being released on DVD. There is a sequel, Killer Raccoons 2: Dark Christmas in the Dark.

== Plot ==
"Everyone knows someone who's had a run-in with an angry racoon. Some people even believe that racoons are smarter than people."

Outside the small rural town of Independence, college buddies Ty Smallwood (Lehr Beidelschies) and Zach (Colin Scianamblo) join a small group of college students visiting the Raccoon Creek Campground to have what they hope will be the best summer break of their lives. Their hopes are dashed when they have run-ins with frat guys, rednecks, hippies, bible students, and an inept set of camp counselors. Things go from bad to worse when they discover that maniacal raccoons have targeted the camp with an intention to wreak havoc on all humanity. When one camper is murdered, the rest seek revenge and retaliation.

== Cast ==
- Lehr Beidelschies as Ty Smallwood
- Brian Kamerer as Ranger Danger / Greg
- Nick Maier as Jones / Rex
- Zach Riedmaier as Dr. Billington / Clayton
- John Sarvas as Store Owner / Jon
- Colin Scianamblo as Zach / Rev. Pookie
- Dan Velez as Agent Charlesworth / Zane
- Travis Irvine as Dick Weener / Ryan
- Tom Lyons as The Mayor
- Alexander Raghuvir as Al Jazeera
- Kasey Cooper as Shane
- Lauren Bowman as Janine
- Marti Babcock as Christine
- Rachel Edwartoski as Melissa

== Background ==
The film was created when Irvine was a senior at Ohio University. Inspired during a 2004 Florida camping trip when he discovered several raccoons seeming to work in a coordinated effort scavenging his campsite, Irvine began to research "Man vs Nature" movies and raccoons in particular, learning that rabid raccoons would act in non-typical ways to attack other animals and children, and that they have stomach bacteria that could infect the brains of humans who eat them. While studying abroad in London, he developed the script that became the film. With the micro-budget of $5000, the film was shot in August 2005 in the Athens and Columbus areas of Ohio. Most cast and crew members have Ohio connections and producer Colin Scianamblo grew up with Irvine in Bexley. Tom Lyons, who played the role of The Mayor and who works at the OhioHealth media center spoke of Irvine and Scianamblo, "They’re both Bexley High School kids who interned for me about five or six years ago." The film also included members of the Ohio University comedy troupe "the Wrong Man group", and due to budget constraints, most cast were forced to play multiple roles. The commercial release of the film marked it as the first feature film to ever be successfully completed by Ohio University communications undergraduate students. The film has been remarked upon as being the first known feature in cinema history to star an assortment of real, dead, frozen animals, rather than live, trained, stuffed, animatronic, or puppet raccoons. The most important "effect" for the film was going to be the raccoons themselves, and Irvine consulted with experts at Ohio State University as he had initially planned on having raccoons prepared by a taxidermist. He was disappointed when he learned that it could cost hundreds of dollars just to have a single animal prepared, but the expert advised him of the usefulness of using frozen animals that could then be thawed, positioned, frozen, and thawed and then frozen for repeated repositionings, so production used seven legally donated frozen raccoons in this manner to create the killer coons.

== Release ==
The film first premiered December 30, 2005 and had its festival debut at the annual Tromadance Film Festival on January 28, 2006, in Salt Lake City, Utah, which coincided with its first theatrical screening at the Drexal Gateway Theater in Columbus, Ohio, which was sponsored by the Drexel Theaters Group and the annual Columbus International Film and Video Festival. A subsequent festival was the 2007 Fright Night Film Festival in Louisville, Kentucky. Distribution rights to the film were acquired by Troma Entertainment in 2006 and they released it on DVD on August 26, 2008.

== Reception ==
Jason Buchanan, reviewer for All Movie Guide wrote, "The laughs flow like rabies-infected blood in this gruesome horror comedy about a group of college campers besieged by a pack of killer raccoons". Peter Syslo of Infernal Dreams wrote, "Coons! turned out to be a very pleasant surprise. I have to admit that I was skeptical at first, due to the title and the subject matter, but I really think that these guys turned out a truly funny horror comedy", while Jamie Lisk of Cranked on Cinema wrote, "While lacking the polish of a Lloyd Kaufman opus, the mindset to offend is the same", "(Coons) will not appeal to everybody, that’s definitely for sure. I’m guessing that this film will end up with more detractors than admirers, but if you’re like me, you’ll enjoy the film’s get-up-and-go, especially if your personal get-up-and-go already got up and went two, four or six beers ago. Irvine should be commended for crafting a fast-paced, Benny-Hill-on-crack kind of crazy, slice of sophomore cinema, one that doesn’t shy away from offering its young male target demographic what it wants – lots of blood, guts and silly, inane hilarity", and "Typical of indie films, some of the main actors have dual or triple roles here, and terrible fake moustaches are employed to help the audience separate them from each other. Dear god!" Reviewer Adam Jackson of The Lantern wrote, "The movie was overzealous in its use of human feces as a source of comedy", "Even the most sophomoric of frat guys could get tired of the movie's use of fart and pooping sounds as a supply of comedy", and "The film's special effects are, surprisingly, one the film's strongest assets". Ohio University's The Outlook reported that, "COONS! has already taken major steps to solidifying itself as a cult sensation", while The Lantern reports that the Drexel Theater showings were held over for an additional 3 weeks due to public demand for the film, and that they plan to launch midnight weekend movies starting March 3. When the film screened at the 2007 Fright Night Film Festival in Louisville, Kentucky, reviewer Troy H. King reported, "These guys just got picked up by TROMA which was great for them and while watching you can tell why: It was like I time warped back to USA's Up All Night. Funny stuff! I'll be buying this movie."
