= Kinter K. Koontz House =

Historic house in Arizona, United States

- U.S. National Register of Historic Places
- U.S. Historic district – Contributing property
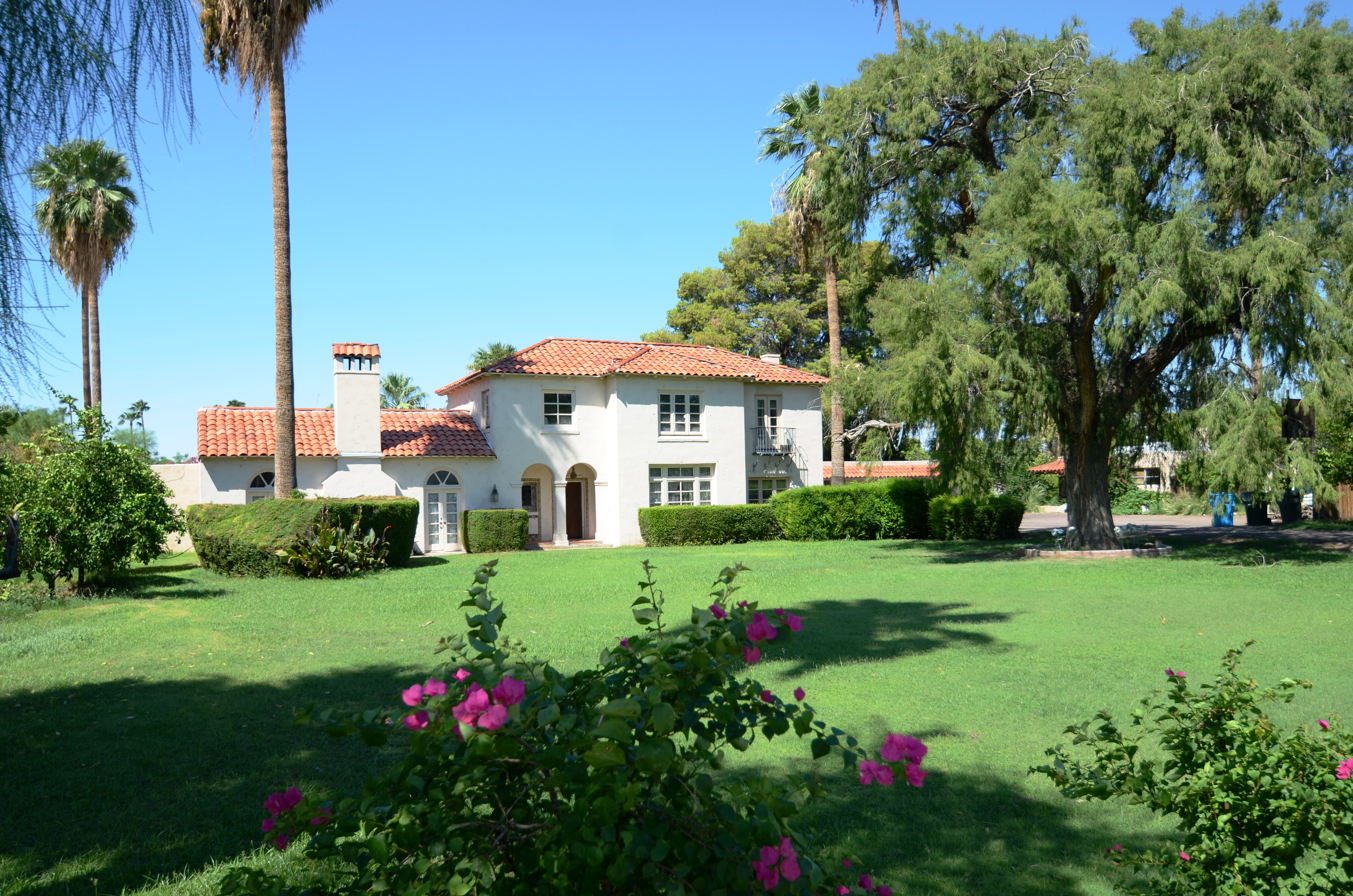

- Location within Arizona Location within the United States
- Location: 7620 N. 7th St., Phoenix, Arizona
- Coordinates: 33°32′52″N 112°3′57″W
- Architectural style: Spanish Colonial Revival
- MPS: North Central Phoenix Farmhouses and Rural Estate Homes, 1895–1959, MPS
- NRHP reference No.: 11000463
- Added to NRHP: July 20, 2011

The Kinter K. Koontz House is a historic house and gardens located at 7620 N. 7th Street in Phoenix, Arizona. It was designed in the Spanish Colonial Revival style.

== Historic preservation ==
The property was listed on the National Register of Historic Places on July 20, 2011, as part of a multiple property listing study titled "North Central Phoenix Farmhouses and Rural Estate Homes, 1895–1959, MPS".

It was listed on the City of Phoenix's historic register, and thus given historic preservation overlay zoning by Phoenix in 2003.
