= RoboJackets =

RoboJackets Logo

RoboJackets is a group of Georgia Tech students, faculty, and alumni that aims to enhance the understanding of the field of robotics and its applications. The team also strives to increase of the number of students exposed to it. The group, located in the Student Competition Center, allows students to engage in a wide range of engineering-related activities, and has members from almost every engineering major of study offered at Georgia Tech. Students work collaboratively in a group environment and have the abilities to pursue projects on their own.

== History ==
RoboJackets was founded in 1999 by a group of grads and undergrads interested in the BattleBots competitions. The following year, they would start their highly respected FIRST outreach and mentoring program. The group's first home was in the J.S. Coon building. In 2003, due to renovations of the Coon building and the mechanical engineering department's move to new buildings, the RoboJackets were moved across the alley to the "Tin Building". After the move, the organization expanded to encompass a new IGVC team (started in 2003) and a RoboCup team (started in 2007). In 2011, the teams were relocated to the new Student Competition Center located on 14th Street, north of the Georgia Tech campus. In 2013, the RoboJackets IARRC team was created. Over the years, the team has grown from a handful of students to over 200 active members.

== Competition ==
The RoboJackets participate in several robotics competitions, including RoboCup Small Size league, FIRST, BattleBots, the International Autonomous Robot Racing Challenge, and the Intelligent Ground Vehicle Competition. The organization also takes part in a few local non-robotics competitions such as the Dooley Derby and the Starlight Soapbox Downhill Challenge.

== Education ==
Since 2001, the RoboJackets have run Technology Enrichment Sessions (TE Sessions) each fall to expose high school students to science, technology, engineering and mathematics. The sessions, typically 10 weeks in length, focus on concepts and skills needed to participate in the FIRST Robotics Competition. The sessions culminate in a robotics challenge which allows the students to apply their newly found skills to a real robotic system. Typical attendance is over twenty schools. This year, two sessions, an advanced and beginner session, are planned.

== Independent Projects ==
The RoboJackets also encourages its members to work on their own independent robotics projects. Some of these have included a hexapod, an inverse-kinematic arm, an automated version of the Georgia Tech "Rambling Wreck" mascot, and a Roomba-like vacuuming robot.
