= L. H. Coon =

American politician (1842–1903)

Member of the Washington House of Representatives for the 44th district
- In office 1895–1897

Personal details
- Born: October 6, 1842 Missouri, United States
- Died: June 4, 1903 (aged 60) Everett, Washington, United States
- Party: Republican

Lewis H. Coon (October 6, 1842 – June 4, 1903) was an American politician in the state of Washington. A Republican, he served in the Washington House of Representatives from 1895 to 1897.
