= Koontz (surname) =

Koontz is the surname of the following notable people:

- Charley Koontz (born 1987), American actor
- Dean Koontz (born 1945), American author
- Elizabeth Duncan Koontz (1919–1989), African-American educator
- Harold Koontz (1909–1984), American business consultant
- Joe Koontz (born 1945), American football player
- Lawrence L. Koontz Jr. (1940–2025), Senior Justice of the Supreme Court of Virginia
- Robin Koontz (born 1954), American children's book author and illustrator
- Roscoe L. Koontz (1922–1997), American health physicist
- Stephe Koontz, American politician
- William Henry Koontz (1830–1911), member of the U.S. House of Representatives
