= John Saylor Coon =

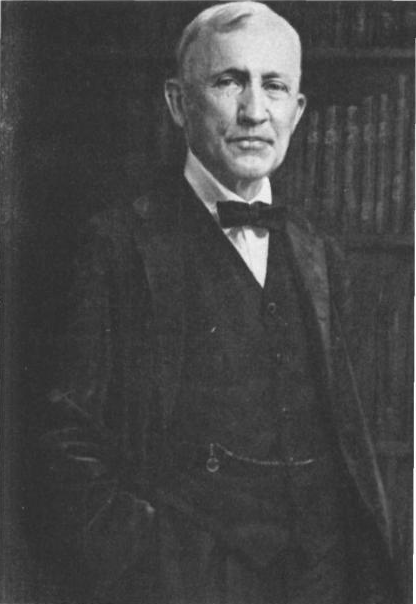
- Coon in an undated photograph
- Born: November 22, 1854; Burdett, New York, U.S.
- Died: May 16, 1938 (aged 83); Canandaigua, New York
- Education: Cornell University
- Scientific career
- Workplaces: Cornell University; University of Tennessee; Georgia Institute of Technology

John Saylor Coon (November 22, 1854 – May 16, 1938) was the first Mechanical Engineering and Drawing Professor at Georgia Tech, and he was also the first chair of Georgia Tech's Mechanical Engineering Department. Coon made significant contributions to the school during his 35-year career at Georgia Tech.

== Early life and education ==
Coon was born to William C. and Susan Saylor Coon in Burdett, New York on November 22, 1854. Coon received his early education at Burdett public schools and Claverack Academy. He earned a bachelor's and a master's degree in mechanical engineering from Cornell University in 1877. Coon completed Cornell's mechanical engineering program in three years and graduated at the top of his class. When he was a student at Cornell, Coon built an engine and a dynamo electric machine, the first one built in the United States. Both the engine and dynamo were demonstrated at the Philadelphia Centennial Exposition in 1876.

== Early career ==
Coon served as an instructor in mechanical engineering at Cornell following graduation. He then worked for several different employers including E. D. Leavitt in New York, Calumet and Hecla Mining Company in Boston, and the Anaconda Copper Company in Montana. Coon also served as the chair of mechanical engineering at the University of Tennessee in 1888.

== Georgia Tech ==
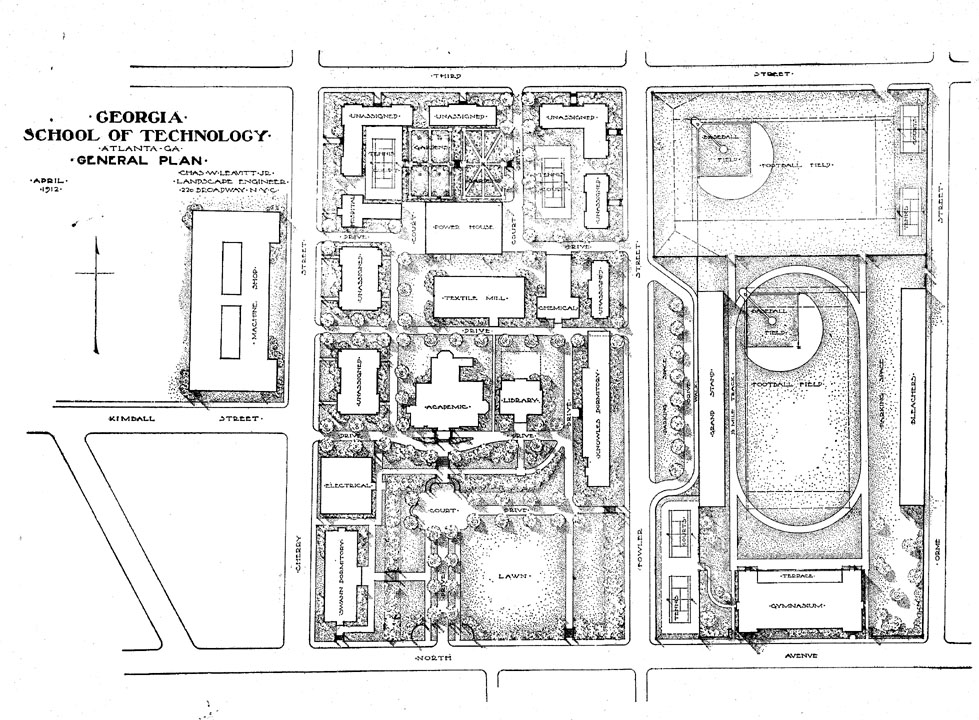
Georgia Tech Master Plan including Shop Building - 1912

Georgia Tech was established in 1885, and the school admitted its first class in 1888, which consisted of 129 mechanical engineering students. Mechanical engineering was the only degree offered at Tech during the school's early years. Coon was appointed the first Mechanical Engineering and Drawing Professor at the Georgia School of Technology in 1889. He was also the first chair of the Mechanical Engineering department. Coon made the classes very challenging and as a result only 28 of the original students earned degrees. These students worked at trades such as forging, woodworking, and machining in the shop located on campus. Their products were initially sold to generate income for Georgia Tech. Coon assumed the role of superintendent of shops in 1896, and he eventually ended the school's involvement with contract work for commercial sales. During his tenure at Georgia Tech, he moved the curriculum away from vocational training. Coon emphasized a balance between the shop and the classroom. Coon taught his students more modern quantification methods to solve engineering problems instead of outdated and more costly trial and error methods. He also played a significant role in developing mechanical engineering into a professional degree program, with a focus on ethics, design and testing, analysis and problem solving, and mathematics. Coon was a founding member of the American Society of Mechanical Engineers, and he also received an honorary doctorate from Georgia Tech.

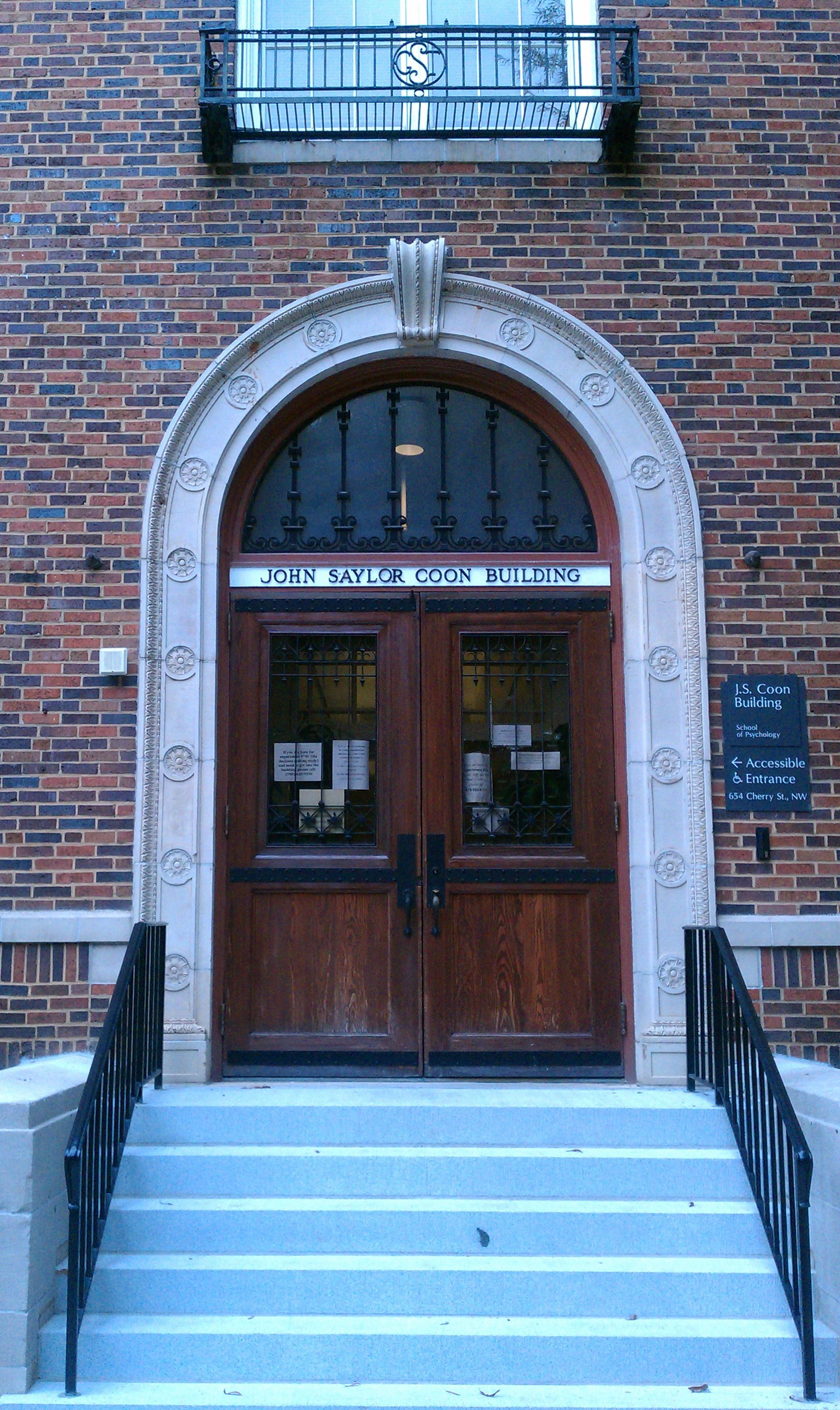
John Saylor Coon Building Main Entrance

=== John Saylor Coon building ===
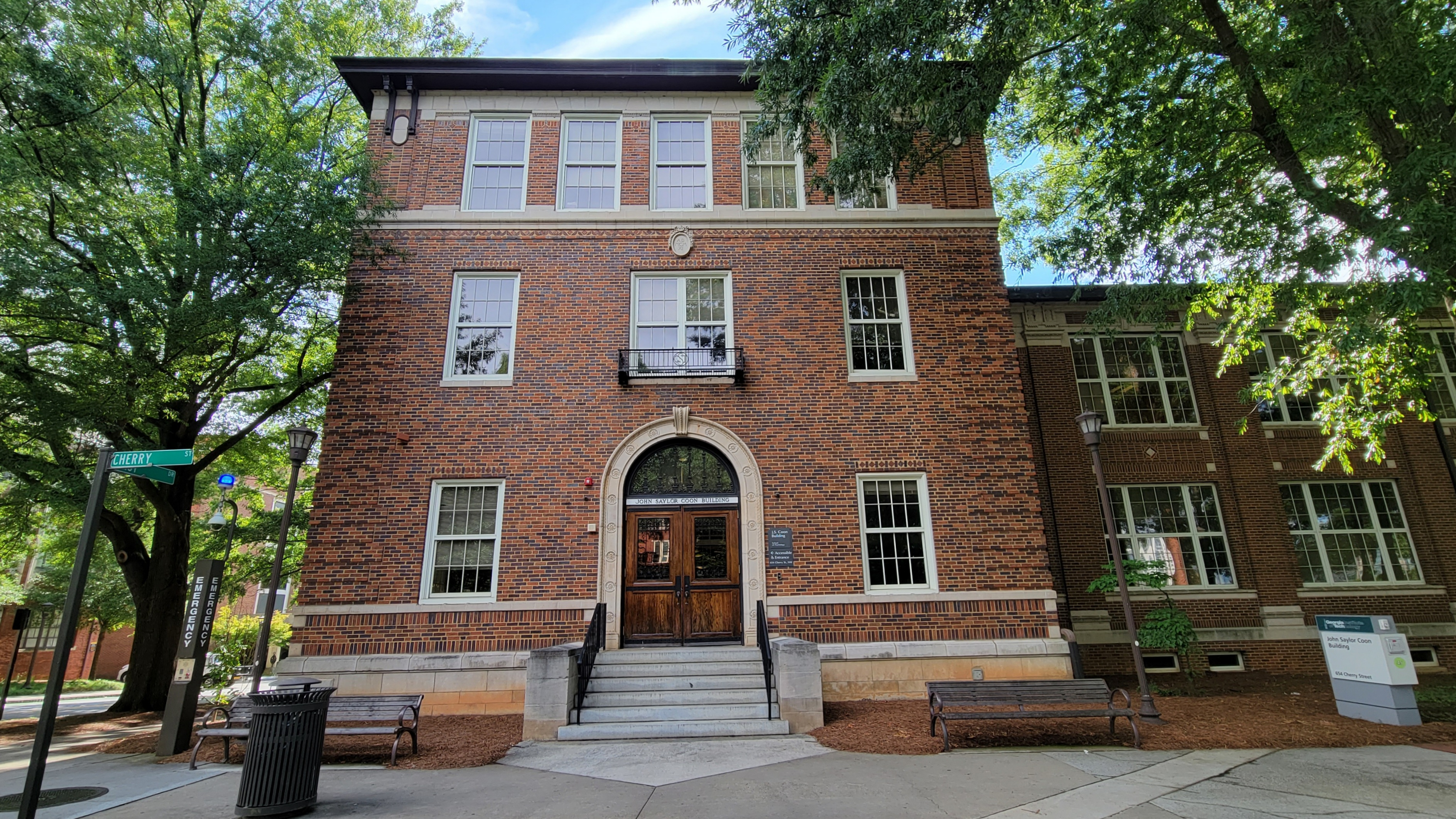
John Saylor Coon Building

The John Saylor Coon building was built in 5 stages from 1912 through 1938, and it was designed by Francis Palmer Smith who was the head of the school's architecture department. It was originally called the New Shop Building since it served as the home for shops and the mechanical engineering department. The Coon building is the oldest building on campus currently used for academics. The building is located on the western boundary of the Georgia Institute of Technology Historic District on Cherry Street across from Tech Tower, and it is included in the 12-building area listed on the National Register of Historic Places.

The Coon Building was the first multiple purpose building on campus. Before the Coon Building was constructed, academics and shops were located in separate buildings. In addition, the work completed in the shop often was not related to the work completed in the classroom, since the shop products were initially made for commercial sale. However, Coon developed a curriculum which required students to design products in the classroom and then make the products in the shop, effectively turning the shop into a laboratory for the students, which is the system still used today by modern schools of mechanical engineering.

The Coon Building underwent an extensive $9.1 million renovation during 2001 through 2003 time frame. The interior of the building was modernized during the renovation project. However, the interior re-design preserved many of the building's original characteristics. The construction project also included an 11,000 square foot addition. This building is currently the home for the school of Psychology, and it was dedicated to Coon following his retirement.

== Later years and death ==
Coon retired in 1923 after serving 35 years at Georgia Tech and he moved to Canandaigua, New York. Coon died on May 16, 1938.

== See also ==
- History of Georgia Tech
- Georgia Institute of Technology Historic District
- George W. Woodruff School of Mechanical Engineering
