= Larry Koon (author) =

Larry Koon (April 26, 1946 – December 30, 2012) was a published author and newspaper columnist who specialized in antiques and collectibles. Koon was born April 26, 1946, in Ripley, West Virginia, where he was also raised. Koon wrote several books on antiques and collectibles, and was the first to write a book on specialized auction markets. Koon also wrote a weekly antiques column for The Marietta Times. His column also appeared in A Woman's View Magazine and other publications around the country. Koon died December 30, 2012.

== Bibliography ==
- North American Auction Markets, published 1997 by Gordons Art Reference,
- Price Guide to Lee Middleton Dolls, published by Hobby House, Grantsville. Maryland
- Price Guide to Annalee Dolls, published by Portfolio Press, New York
- Price Guide to Stickley Brothers Furniture, published by Collector Books, Paducah, Ky
- Price Guide to Roycroft Furniture, published by Collector Books, Paducah, Ky
- Stickley Brothers Furniture, Identification and Value Guide
