= NBA collective bargaining agreement =

Labor contract between NBA and the players' union

The collective bargaining agreement (CBA) of the National Basketball Association (NBA) is a contract between the league (the commissioner and the 30 team owners) and the National Basketball Players Association (NBPA), the players' union, that dictates the rules of player contracts, trades, revenue distribution, the NBA draft, and the salary cap, among other things. In June 2005, the NBA's 1999 CBA expired, meaning the League and the players' union had to negotiate a new agreement; in light of the 2004–05 NHL lockout, the two sides quickly came to an agreement, and ratified a new CBA in July 2005. This agreement expired following the 2010–11 season, leading to the 2011 NBA lockout. A new CBA was ratified in December 2011, ending the lockout.

Little changed in terms of the salary cap between the 1999 and 2005 versions of the CBA. In exchange for agreeing to the controversial player age minimum, the players received a slightly higher percentage of the League's revenues over the course of the new agreement. Additionally, the League's maximum salary decreased slightly in comparison to the 1999 CBA. Under the 2011 CBA, the players received a lower percentage of league revenues.

In 2005, players received 57% of the income, and as of the 2016 CBA, they are receiving about 49–51% of revenue. At that time, the next CBA discussion was set for ten years to 2017. In 2016, the NBA and NBA Players Association met to work on a new CBA, which both sides approved in December of that year. This most recent agreement started with the 2017–18 season and runs through 2023–24, with a mutual opt-out after 2022–23. Either side had to give notice by December 15, 2022, if their decision was to opt out following 2022–23, but in December 2022 agreement was reached to extend that deadline to February 8, 2023. By April 26, 2023, the NBA and the NBPA came to an agreement. The players voted to ratify this new agreement which would go into effect July 1, 2023, and would last until the 2029–30 season. The 2016 CBA funds health insurance for retired players, and increased benefits for active players, including a tuition reimbursement fund co-funded by the union and by the league.

- Creation of “two-way” contracts that will pay players who shuttle between their NBA and NBA G League teams.
- A new “designated veteran player exception” has been created, adding a sixth year for players on veteran contracts who meet certain criteria.
- A shorter preseason, with no more than six exhibition games before the start of the regular season and an earlier start to the regular season.

== Roster size ==
A team may have a maximum of 15 players on its active roster, and at least eight active players must suit up for every game. Any remaining players are placed in the Inactive List, and cannot play in games. Teams may have a maximum of two players on the Inactive List; this can drop to zero for up to two weeks at a time, and additional, temporary inactive positions may be added with league approval in hardship cases. The Inactive List can change up to 60 minutes before opening tip by informing the official scorer of the game. A player can be inactive for as little as one game. Players sent to the NBA G League will continue to count on a team's inactive list. While individual teams must carry a minimum of 13 (12 active plus one inactive) players, the NBA guarantees a league-wide average of at least 14 players per team. The league is surcharged if they do not meet the average.

Prior to the 2005 CBA, injured players could be placed on an injured list but were forced to sit out a minimum of five games.

The NBA's 2011 CBA proposal reportedly included an "amnesty clause" – a one-time opportunity for teams to remove their worst contracts from the books.

== Trades ==
Players can be traded between teams in exchange for other players, draft picks and/or a limited amount of cash. Coaches may only be traded for draft picks or cash. Trades are not allowed to be contingent on the completion of other trades. Under the CBA, a team cannot expend nor receive more than $5.617 million in trades in a given season.

== See also ==
- Eligibility for the NBA draft
