= 1987 Mississippi Amendment 3 =

Referendum to repeal interracial marriage ban

- November 3, 1987
- This proposal repeals Section 263, which makes illegal the marriage of a white person to a person having one-eighth or more Negro blood.

Results
Choice	Votes	%
Yes	264,064	51.76%
No	246,135	48.24%
Yes
70–80%
60–70%
50–60%
No
60–70%
50–60%

1987 Mississippi Amendment 3 was a proposed amendment to the Constitution of Mississippi to repeal the state's defunct ban on interracial marriage. The amendment was symbolic, as the Supreme Court had ruled interracial marriage bans unconstitutional in Loving v. Virginia 20 years prior, which rendered the provision unenforceable. Placed on the ballot by House Concurrent Resolution No. 13, it was approved with 51.76% of the vote, though 44 of Mississippi's 82 counties voted against.

== Background ==
=== Supreme Court ===
In 1967, as a result of the Supreme Court of the United States ruling in Loving v. Virginia, Mississippi's interracial marriage ban was struck down. However, the ban remained in Mississippi's constitution as a defunct provision.

=== First interracial marriage ===
On August 2, 1970, what is believed to be the first legally performed interracial marriage in Mississippi took place between Roger and Berta Mills. On July 21, 1970, the couple applied for a marriage license, but were denied one after the Hinds County Circuit Clerk was ordered by a judge not to do so, with the judge citing the state's 19th-century ban. The denial came at the request of the Southern National Party, a white segregationist group that had asked Circuit Judge Marshall Perry of Grenada County to deny the marriage license, as well as one to another interracial couple in Hinds County that was seeking one. However, on July 31, following what The Desert Sun reporter Hayes Johnson described as a "tense and highly publicized battle", U.S. District Judge Harold Cox ordered the circuit clerk to issue both licenses. The couple married two days later.

=== Pre-election atmosphere ===
Of the ten amendments on the ballot this year, Amendment 3 drew the most attention. However, none of the ten received high publicity.

== Legislation ==
House Concurrent Resolution No. 13 placed the amendment on the ballot. On January 21, 1987, the House Constitution Committee voted to approve the resolution. On January 22, the Mississippi House of Representatives voted in favor, in a 110 to 2 vote. During the week of January 30, the Mississippi House voted again, this time in a 70 to 40 vote. On March 11, the Mississippi State Senate voted to approve the amendment, while also adopting minor amendments.

== Endorsements ==
=== Support ===
Those in support had many reasons in favor of the change, including that repeal would "have image benefits", that the language was unenforceable, that it was racist, that it was outdated, and that repeal "brings the constitution in line with present practice".

Yes

State officials

- Edwin L. Pittman, attorney general of Mississippi (1984–1988 (Democratic)

State legislators

- Isiah Fredericks, state representative from the 119th district (1980–1990) (Democratic)
- Walter Phillips, state representative from Bay St. Louis
- John Reeves, state representative from the 72nd district (Democratic)

Newspapers

- The Clarion-Ledger
- Enterprise-Journal
- Hattiesburg American
- Magee Courier
- Sun Herald

=== Opposition ===
Before the election was held, there was no organized opposition to any of the 10 amendments on the ballot that year. Some newspapers, such as The Clarion-Ledger, the Hattiesburg American, and the Sun Herald, supported the amendment's passage, though preferred for a constitutional convention to take place so that bigger changes could be made.

== Contents ==
The following information was shown to voters for Amendment 3:

Amendment No. 3

House Concurrent Resolution

No. 13

This proposal repeals Section 263, which makes illegal the marriage of a white person to a person having one-eighth or more Negro blood.

For......................................( )

Against................................( )

== Results ==
38 counties voted in favor, and 44 voted against. The highest level of support came from Coahoma County, with 70.02% in favor, and the lowest came from Simpson County, with 35.56% of the county's vote being in favor.

The following table details the results by county:

County	Yes		No	
County	#	%	#	%
Adams	2,941	52.81	2,628	47.19
Alcorn	1,433	46.27	1,664	53.73
Amite	2,019	57.23	1,509	42.77
Attala	2,675	52.49	2,421	47.51
Benton	735	51.18	701	48.82
Bolivar	2,770	62.35	1,673	37.65
Calhoun	1,463	46.21	1,703	53.79
Carroll	1,047	39.92	1,576	60.08
Chickasaw	1,704	53.45	1,484	46.55
Choctaw	1,034	47.19	1,157	52.81
Claiborne	1,746	58.06	1,261	41.94
Clarke	2,752	50.51	2,696	49.49
Clay	2,433	55.82	1,926	44.18
Coahoma	2,170	70.02	929	29.98
Copiah	3,270	50.65	3,186	49.35
Covington	1,748	44.12	2,214	55.88
DeSoto	3,072	47.77	3,359	52.23
Forrest	7,576	50.28	7,493	49.72
Franklin	969	44.99	1,185	55.01
George	1,771	48.35	1,892	51.65
Greene	1,091	41.66	1,528	58.34
Grenada	3,548	57.59	2,613	42.41
Hancock	3,915	54.54	3,263	45.46
Harrison	18,985	58.26	13,599	41.74
Hinds	24,950	61.70	15,489	38.30
Holmes	2,576	54.68	2,135	45.32
Humphreys	964	46.44	1,112	53.56
Issaquena	317	51.63	297	48.37
Itawamba	2,415	49.71	2,443	50.29
Jackson	15,104	54.60	12,558	45.40
Jasper	2,562	46.73	2,921	53.27
Jefferson	1,184	61.67	736	38.33
Jefferson Davis	1,558	45.57	1,861	54.43
Jones	8,219	46.83	9,333	53.17
Kemper	1,166	49.70	1,180	50.30
Lafayette	3,039	55.53	2,434	44.47
Lamar	3,515	48.77	3,693	51.23
Lauderdale	6,529	54.01	5,559	45.99
Lawrence	1,410	40.31	2,088	59.69
Leake	2,059	44.69	2,548	55.31
Lee	4,380	58.08	3,161	41.92
Leflore	2,186	47.60	2,406	52.40
Lincoln	4,041	42.34	5,504	57.66
Lowndes	5,278	45.57	6,305	54.43
Madison	3,881	58.55	2,747	41.45
Marion	3,580	53.77	3,078	46.23
Marshall	2,446	50.11	2,435	49.89
Monroe	2,909	47.64	3,197	52.36
Montgomery	1,197	47.48	1,324	52.52
Neshoba	2,897	47.30	3,228	52.70
Newton	2,648	48.85	2,773	51.15
Noxubee	1,132	45.35	1,364	54.65
Oktibbeha	4,325	58.37	3,085	41.63
Panola	2,466	48.27	2,643	51.73
Pearl River	3,559	43.88	4,552	56.12
Perry	1,280	43.26	1,679	56.74
Pike	4,631	54.39	3,884	45.61
Pontotoc	2,081	49.11	2,156	50.89
Prentiss	2,171	47.67	2,383	52.33
Quitman	1,311	53.08	1,159	46.92
Rankin	9,878	49.45	10,099	50.55
Scott	2,752	52.55	2,485	47.45
Sharkey	1,052	57.27	785	42.73
Simpson	2,639	35.56	4,782	64.44
Smith	2,009	41.92	2,784	58.08
Stone	1,663	47.39	1,846	52.61
Sunflower	3,180	52.54	2,872	47.46
Tallahatchie	1,650	51.81	1,535	48.19
Tate	1,309	47.12	1,469	52.88
Tippah	1,588	67.55	763	32.45
Tishomingo	1,601	50.95	1,541	49.05
Tunica	646	54.15	547	45.85
Union	2,001	46.55	2,298	53.45
Walthall	1,003	43.93	1,280	56.07
Warren	6,733	55.99	5,293	44.01
Washington	5,452	56.95	4,121	43.05
Wayne	2,608	44.38	3,269	55.62
Webster	1,405	49.37	1,441	50.63
Wilkinson	635	49.26	654	50.74
Winston	2,359	39.72	3,580	60.28
Yalobusha	1,388	46.58	1,592	53.42
Yazoo	1,680	45.79	1,989	54.21
Total	264,064	51.76	246,135	48.24

== Subsequent polling ==
=== 2011 Republicans ===
In April 2011, a poll conducted on Mississippi Republicans by Public Policy Polling asking if interracial marriage should be legal or illegal found that 40% believed it should be legal, 46% believed that it should not be, and 14% were unsure.

=== 2011 likely voters ===
In 2012, the same organization, PPP, released a survey containing, this time, "likely Mississippi voters". The poll was conducted from November 4 to 6 on 796 of such individuals, and had a +/-3.5% margin of error. 60% were in favor of it being legal, 23% were opposed, and 17% were unsure.

Cross tabs of the 2011 Mississippi likely voters poll
Demographic subgroup	Yes	No	Not sure
Total	60	23	17
Gender
Men	59	24	17
Women	62	21	17
Race
White	54	27	19
African-American	77	13	10
Other	83	–	17
Age
18–29 years old	50	31	19
30–45 years old	61	24	15
46–65 years old	67	14	19
65 and older	55	31	14
Ideology
Very liberal	73	15	11
Somewhat liberal	74	16	10
Moderate	70	19	12
Somewhat conservative	53	28	20
Very conservative	53	25	22
Party
Democrat	77	13	10
Republican	52	29	20
Independent/Other	54	23	23

== See also ==
- 1978 Tennessee Proposal 1
- 1998 South Carolina Amendment 4
- 2000 Alabama Amendment 2
