= 1987 Mississippi ballot measures =

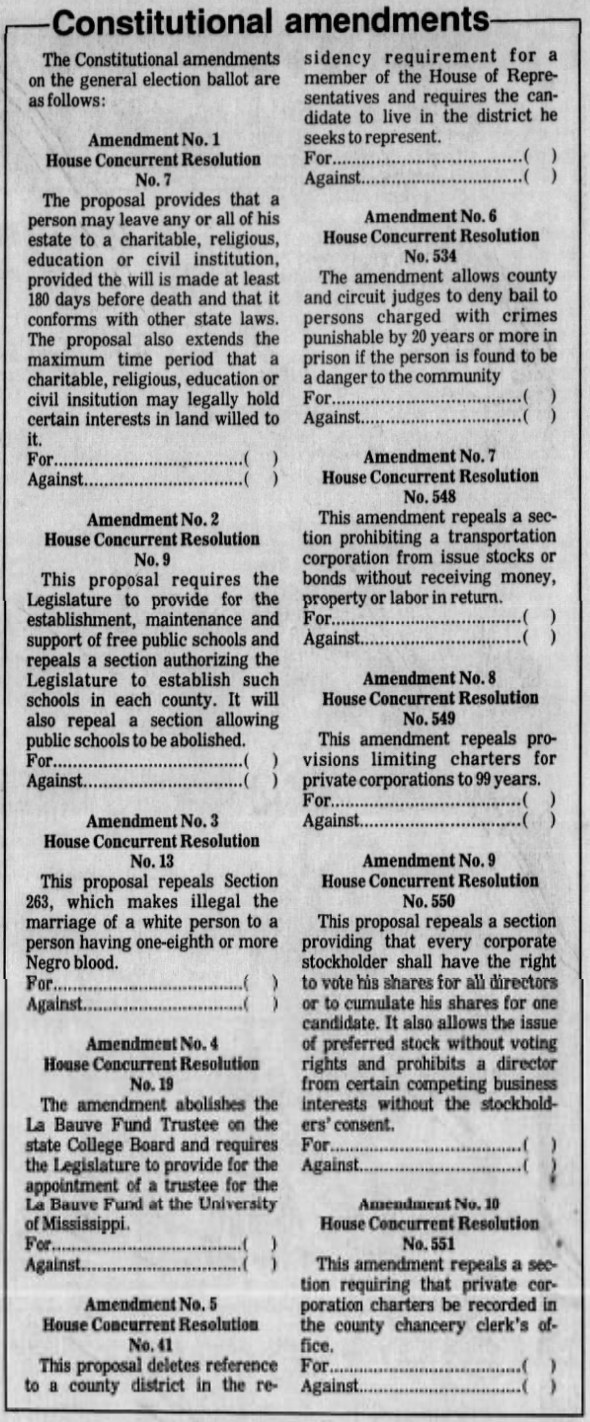
Sample ballot of the 1987 constitutional amendments

On November 3, 1987, the U.S. state of Mississippi held referendums on ten state-level constitutional amendments, with topics ranging from repealing a defunct interracial marriage ban to requiring political candidates to live in the district they hope to represent. None of the ballot measures faced organized opposition and all ten passed. Of the ten amendments, all but one, Amendment 3, passed by margins of approximately 40%. Amendment 3 passed by just 3.52%. Since 1912, this has remained the largest number of ballot measures decided by Mississippi voters in a single year.

== History ==
Beginning with the Constitution of 1832, the legislature of Mississippi has held the power to refer proposed amendments to the state constitution to the ballot for approval or rejection by the state's voters. (Note: Before then, with the 1817 Constitution, which was the state's first constitution, the legislature could only place a question on the ballot asking whether a constitutional convention should be held.) A total of 62 constitutional amendments have been referred to the ballot in Mississippi since 1912, with 60 coming from the state's legislature, and the other 2 initiated by citizens.

In the 1987 election, ten amendments were referred to voters, which remains the largest number of measures voted on by Mississippi voters in a single year since 1912.

== Reception ==
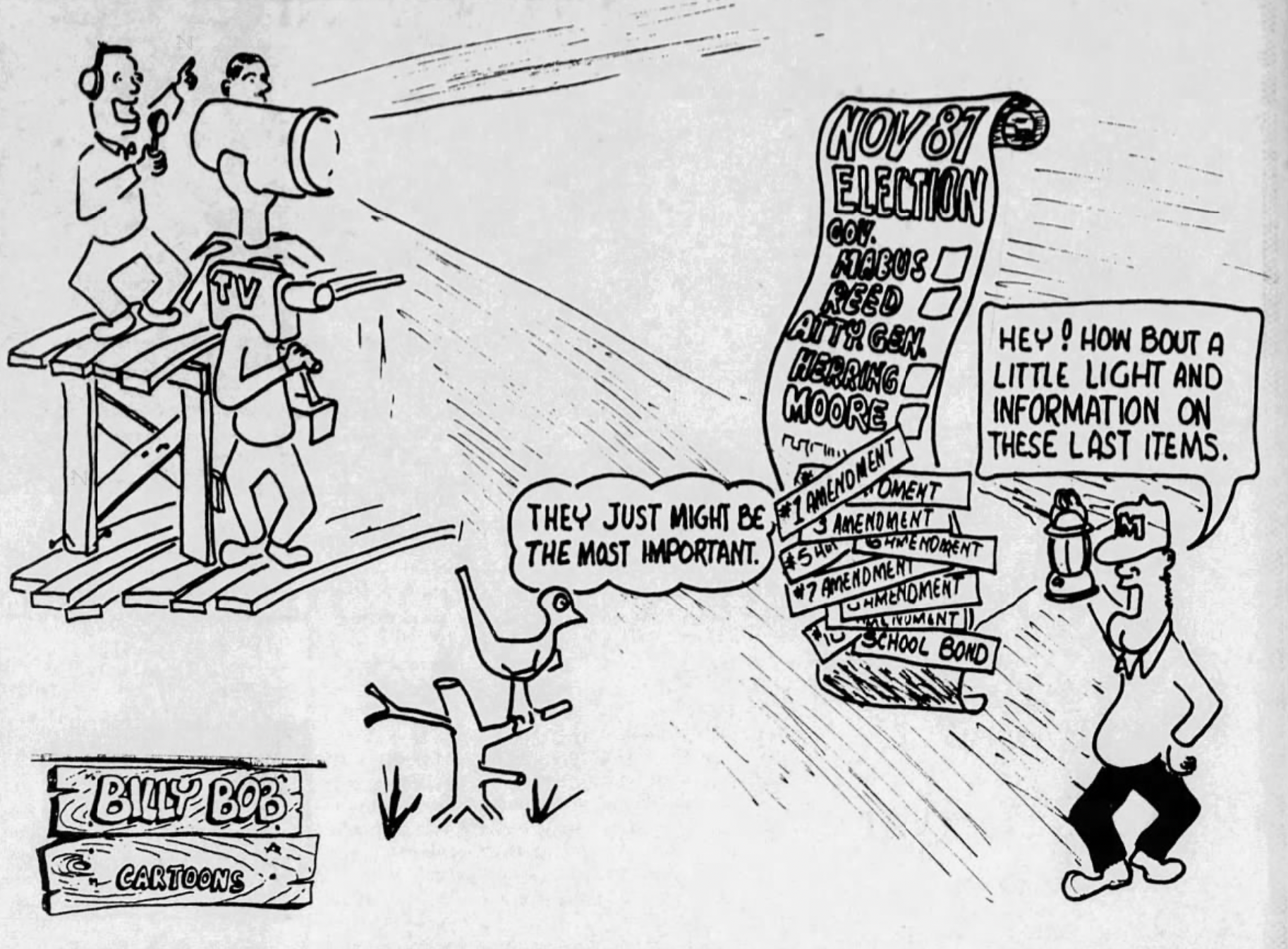
A cartoon that calls on voters to look into the 1987 ballot measures

There was no organized opposition to any of the 10 measures on the ballot, nor did any create "legislative fireworks". At the time, many newspapers, including The Clarion-Ledger, the Hattiesburg American, and the Sun Herald, wrote editorials in favor of a constitutional convention taking place so that larger changes could occur at a single time, rather than requiring individual amendments. The Sun Herald's argument in favor of a convention, for example, was because of its belief that the 1890 constitution was "cluttered", and that a majority of the constitution's provisions "belong in statutory law."

== Ballot measures ==
Mississippi voters decided on the ten amendments on November 3, 1987.

Map key
80–90% (yes)
70–80% (yes)
60–70% (yes)
50–60% (yes)
50–60% (no)
60–70% (no)

1987 Mississippi ballot measures
Amendment	Description	Yes		No		Results map	Method of referral and effect of amendment
Amendment	Description	No.	Pct.	No.	Pct.	Results map	Method of referral and effect of amendment
1	Constitutional amendment to allow a person to use their will to leave any or all of their estate to a charity, religious institution, education institution, or civil institution, so long as the will adheres to state laws and is made at minimum 180 days before the individual dies; and to increase the maximum time period that any of the aforementioned organizations could legally hold specific interests in land that was willed to them, to not longer than 10 years	367,450	73.12	135,049	26.88	A map of Mississippi's counties shaded by different colors to display the results of Amendment 1.	House Concurrent Resolution No. 7; Section 270 of the Mississippi Constitution of 1890 amended
2	Constitutional amendment to require the state legislature to establish, maintain, and support free public schools; to repeal a section that has the aforementioned requirements but for each county; and to repeal a section allowing the state legislature to abolish free public schools within the state and allowing counties and school districts to do the same	353,317	71.30	142,211	28.70	A map of Mississippi's counties shaded by different colors to display the results of Amendment 2.	House Concurrent Resolution No. 9; Section 201 of the Mississippi Constitution of 1890 amended, and Sections 205 and 213-B of the Mississippi Constitution of 1890 repealed
3	Constitutional amendment to repeal an unenforceable ban on interracial marriages between a white person and a Black person and interracial marriages between a white person and a mulatto	264,064	51.76	246,135	48.24	A map of Mississippi's counties shaded by different colors to display the results of Amendment 3.	House Concurrent Resolution No. 13; Section 263 of the Mississippi Constitution of 1890 repealed
4	Constitutional amendment to remove the La Bauve Fund Trustee from the Mississippi College Board and to require the state legislature to appoint a trustee for the aforementioned fund at the University of Mississippi	341,692	71.00	139,540	29.00	A map of Mississippi's counties shaded by different colors to display the results of Amendment 4.	House Concurrent Resolution No. 19; Section 213-A of the Mississippi Constitution of 1890 amended
5	Constitutional amendment to require candidates running for the Mississippi House of Representatives to live in the district for which they are running	382,632	78.23	106,456	21.77	A map of Mississippi's counties shaded by different colors to display the results of Amendment 5.	House Concurrent Resolution No. 41; Section 41 of the Mississippi Constitution of 1890 amended
6	Constitutional amendment to allow county and circuit court judges to deny bail if the offense has evident proof and is punishable by a maximum of 20 or more years, or life, imprisonment, if releasing the person who was arrested would cause a "special danger" to the public; to require the judge who makes such decision to record their reasoning; and to grant any individual denied bail the ability to appeal for an emergency hearing before a Mississippi Supreme Court justice	394,100	79.84	99,521	20.16	A map of Mississippi's counties shaded by different colors to display the results of Amendment 6.	Senate Concurrent Resolution No. 534; Section 29 of the Mississippi Constitution of 1890 amended
7	Constitutional amendment to repeal the prohibition of transportation corporations issuing stocks or bonds if the corporation does not receive money, labor, or property in return; and to repeal the section that makes void the fictitious increase of stock and indebtedness	344,430	71.96	134,220	28.04	A map of Mississippi's counties shaded by different colors to display the results of Amendment 7.	Senate Concurrent Resolution No. 548; Section 196 of the Mississippi Constitution of 1890 repealed
8	Constitutional amendment to delete provisions that set the limit of charters for private corporations to 99 years	333,905	70.02	142,954	29.98	A map of Mississippi's counties shaded by different colors to display the results of Amendment 8.	Senate Concurrent Resolution No. 549; Section 178 of the Mississippi Constitution of 1890 amended
9	Constitutional amendment to repeal a section that allows for corporate stockholders to use their shares to vote for all directors or one candidate; to allow the topic of preferred stock without voting; and to prohibit a director from specific competing business interests without the consent of the stockholders	336,138	70.43	141,153	29.57	A map of Mississippi's counties shaded by different colors to display the results of Amendment 9.	Senate Concurrent Resolution No. 550; Section 194 of the Mississippi Constitution of 1890 repealed
10	Constitutional amendment to repeal a section providing that charters which are granted to private corporations must be recorded in the chancery clerk's office (Note: Each of Mississippi's 82 counties have one chancery clerk, with the job entailing recording and making public the official minutes of the Board of Supervisors, writing and signing checks for payments, archiving records, overseeing the storage and disposal of numerous county records, and other areas, including matters of estates and guardianships, and other areas similar to those.) of the county in which the headquarters of such corporation is located	335,119	69.74	145,427	30.26	A map of Mississippi's counties shaded by different colors to display the results of Amendment 10.	Senate Concurrent Resolution No. 551; Section 189 of the Mississippi Constitution of 1890 repealed
