= 1998 South Carolina Amendment 4 =

Referendum to repeal interracial marriage ban

Amendment No. 4
- November 3, 1998
- Shall Section 33, Article III of the Constitution of this State be amended by deleting the following sentence from the Constitution: 'The marriage of a white person with a Negro or mulatto, or person who shall have one-eighth or more of Negro blood, shall be unlawful and void'.

Results
| Choice | Votes | % |
|---|---|---|
| Yes | 565,805 | 61.95% |
| No | 347,533 | 38.05% |
County results
Yes
70–80%
60–70%
50–60%
No
50–60%

1998 South Carolina Amendment 4 was a ballot measure decided by South Carolina voters on November 3, 1998. Voters were asked whether to repeal the state's constitutional ban on interracial marriage, which had been legally unenforceable since the United States Supreme Court case of Loving v. Virginia in 1967, which found all bans on interracial marriage to be in violation of two clauses of the Fourteenth Amendment. Placed on the ballot by Bill 4303, the ballot measure succeeded with just under 62% of the vote, and with all but six (Note: Counties in opposition: Cherokee; Chesterfield; Dillon; Lancaster; Saluda; Union) of the state's forty-six counties having a majority vote in favor.

Supporters of the change included Governor David Beasley and State House Speaker Pro-Tempore Terry Haskins, while opposition was limited and prominently came from state representative John Graham Altman. Following approval by voters in November 1998, the state legislature ratified the change in February 1999.

== Background ==
=== Legal history ===
The interracial marriage ban clause in South Carolina's constitution dated back to 1895, when the document was rewritten "as part of a sometimes violent backlash against Reconstruction." The 1895 constitution was written under Governor Ben Tillman, whose administration was run on the idea that control of the state government should be held by white people.

By 1945, thirty U.S. states had adopted anti-miscegenation laws in statute form or in their state constitutions, including all Southern states. In 1967, the Supreme Court of the United States ruled interracial marriage bans to be in violation of the Equal Protection and Due Process clauses of the Fourteenth Amendment, thereby striking down all state laws that had banned such marriages. South Carolina's defunct laws remained on the books. After the ruling, South Carolina's Attorney General Daniel McLeod urged for license bureaus to issue marriage licenses to interracial couples.

In 1970 and 1972, following an opinion issued by AG Daniel McLeod in 1969 that the ban was unconstitutional, South Carolina repealed its statutory anti-miscegenation provisions. However, section 33 of article 3, the interracial marriage ban clause of South Carolina's constitution, still remained in place. In 1998, at the time of repeal of the constitutional ban, South Carolina was the second-to-last state to have a defunct ban on interracial marriage; the final state to repeal its ban was Alabama in 2000.

=== Legislation and fiscal cost for Amendment 4 ===
==== Legislation ====

| Democrat yea Democrat abstain/not voting | Republican yea Republican nay Republican abstain/not voting |

Vacant district

Bill 4303 from the 112th Session, 1997–1998 of the South Carolina General Assembly placed Amendment 4 on the ballot. The bill was authored by State Rep. Brad Jordan; however, Jordan allowed for State Rep. Curtis Inabinett, a Black lawmaker, to be the bill's introducer and chief sponsor. Inabinett first discovered that the law was still around two years prior, when he asked the South Carolina House of Representatives' research department to find racist laws that were still on the books. Years before this, House Speaker Pro Tempor Terry Haskins, a white Republican, attempted to amend the ban. However, legislative bill-writers discouraged his idea. Haskins said they deterred him by saying "Everyone knows that's not enforceable, and it's too much trouble to bother making everyone go through the vote on it."

In the State House, the bill received 99 votes in favor, 4 votes against, and had 20 representatives not vote. The 4 opposition votes came from State Representatives John Graham Altman, Dan Cooper, Larry Koon, and Margaret Gamble. In the State Senate, the bill was passed in a unanimous voice vote.

Some legislators feared that if the ban was put to referendum, there might be a large minority of voters against removing it. Other lawmakers, however, had not even known it was still part of the constitution.

==== Fiscal estimates ====
Marci Andino, a member of the South Carolina Election Commission, estimated that the addition of the amendment to the ballot would cost between $25,000 and $30,000.

== Endorsements ==
=== Support ===
Arguments in favor of removing the ban included religious stances, that the ban was antiquated, that it was racist, that it limited individual freedom, and that it fostered racial division.

Yes

State officials

- David Beasley, governor of South Carolina (1995–1999) (Republican)

State legislators

- John Michael Baxley, state representative from the 65th district (1987–1998) (Democratic)
- Chip Campsen, state representative from the 112th district (1996–2002) (Republican)
- Robert Ford, state senator from the 42nd district (1993–2013) (Democratic)
- Jerry Govan Jr., state representative from the 95th district (1992–2022) (Democratic)
- Bobby Harrell, Speaker of the House (2005–2014) (Republican)
- Terry Haskins, House Speaker Pro-Tempore (1995–2000) (Republican)
- Curtis B. Inabinett, state representative from the 116th district (1991–1999) (Democratic)
- Darrell Jackson, state senator from the 21st district (1993–present) (Democratic)
- Brad Jordan, state representative from the 6th district (1996–1998) (Republican)
- Tom Keegan, state representative from the 106th district (1989–2003) (Republican)
- Joseph Neal, state representative from the 70th district (1993–2017) (Democratic)
- Olin Phillips, state representative from the 30th district (1979–2008) (Democratic)
- John L. Scott Jr., state representative from the 77th district (1991–2009) (Democratic)
- Fletcher Smith, state representative from the 23rd district (1996–2007) (Democratic)
- Jeff Young, state representative from the 67th district (1995–1998, 2001–2002) (Republican)

Party officials

- Dick Harpootlian, chairman of the South Carolina Democratic Party (1998–2003, 2011–2013) (Democratic)

Newspapers

- The Herald
- The State
- The Beaufort Gazette
- The Greenville News

=== Opposition ===
Those in opposition, such as state representative John Graham Altman, who was among the most outspoken opponents of the change, argued that the change was political correctness. Altman believed it to be wrong that the South Carolina legislature would attempt to repeal this provision but avoid removing other archaic clauses that had been ruled unconstitutional, such as women being denied the right to vote, and the requirement that a person be religious to be sworn into public office. He also felt that the ban should be left there "as a lesson for us never to do it again".

The basis of other arguments in opposition included religion, and that different animal species do not breed with each other.

No

State legislators

- Dan Cooper, state representative from the 10th district (1990–2011) (Republican)
- John Graham Altman, state representative from the 119th district (1997–2005) (Republican)
- Larry Koon, state representative from the 87th district (1975–2005) (Republican)
- Liston Barfield, state representative from the 58th district (1985–1989) (1997–2013) (Republican)

== Contents ==
The amendment, which was decided by voters alongside the 1998 South Carolina elections on November 3, 1998, had the following question and explanation shown to voters for Amendment 4:

"Shall Section 33, Article III of the Constitution of this State be amended by deleting the following sentence from the Constitution: 'The marriage of a white person with a Negro or mulatto, or person who shall have one-eighth or more of Negro blood, shall be unlawful and void'.

Yes []

No []

Those voting in favor of the question shall deposit a ballot with a check or cross mark in the square after the word 'Yes', and those voting against the question shall deposit a ballot with a check or cross mark in the square after the word 'No'."

Explanation of above: This amendment, if approved, will remove the part of the Constitution that makes marriage between whites and blacks illegal. (Note: The amendment included the explanation because state legislators were afraid that voters would not understand the meaning of the ballot question.)

== Pre-decision polling ==
| Poll source | Date(s) administered | Sample size (Note: Key: A – all adults RV – registered voters LV – likely voters V – unclear) | Margin of error | Yes | No | Undecided |
|---|---|---|---|---|---|---|
| Mason-Dixon | August 1998 | 806 (RV) | ±4% | 67% (Note: The source says that "two-thirds" were in favor of repeal.) | 22% | ~11% |
| Mason-Dixon | December 9–11, 1997 | 820 (RV) | ±3.5% | 48% | 29% | ? |

== Results ==
40 counties voted in favor of the measure, and 6 voted against. The highest level of support came from Beaufort County, which had 75.34% vote in favor, and the lowest level came from Cherokee County, which had 44.70% in favor. Of the 1,930 precincts in the state at the time of the referendum, 1,412 precincts (73.16%) had a majority vote in favor of the amendment, 500 (25.91%) voted against it, and 18 (0.93%) were tied. Absentee, provisional, and fail-safe ballots were tabulated separately from other precinct-level returns.

| County | Yes | | No | |
| County | # | % | # | % |
|---|---|---|---|---|
| Abbeville | 3,218 | 50.77 | 3,121 | 49.23 |
| Aiken | 20,053 | 63.78 | 11,387 | 36.22 |
| Allendale | 882 | 56.90 | 668 | 43.10 |
| Anderson | 21,690 | 54.00 | 18,478 | 46.00 |
| Bamberg | 1,491 | 55.68 | 1,187 | 44.32 |
| Barnwell | 2,301 | 53.54 | 1,997 | 46.46 |
| Beaufort | 22,213 | 75.34 | 7,272 | 24.66 |
| Berkeley | 14,743 | 62.38 | 8,891 | 37.62 |
| Calhoun | 2,391 | 53.55 | 2,074 | 46.45 |
| Charleston | 52,287 | 74.14 | 18,241 | 25.86 |
| Cherokee | 5,056 | 44.70 | 6,254 | 55.30 |
| Chester | 3,792 | 54.59 | 3,154 | 45.41 |
| Chesterfield | 4,169 | 48.68 | 4,395 | 51.32 |
| Clarendon | 3,772 | 54.15 | 3,194 | 45.85 |
| Colleton | 4,073 | 52.79 | 3,643 | 47.21 |
| Darlington | 7,327 | 54.83 | 6,037 | 45.17 |
| Dillon | 2,472 | 46.92 | 2,796 | 53.08 |
| Dorchester | 13,739 | 65.87 | 7,120 | 34.13 |
| Edgefield | 3,271 | 61.04 | 2,088 | 38.96 |
| Fairfield | 3,146 | 63.52 | 1,807 | 36.48 |
| Florence | 15,305 | 55.91 | 12,070 | 44.09 |
| Georgetown | 6,960 | 59.38 | 4,762 | 40.62 |
| Greenville | 63,306 | 63.58 | 36,265 | 36.42 |
| Greenwood | 8,319 | 59.26 | 5,718 | 40.74 |
| Hampton | 2,618 | 52.46 | 2,372 | 47.54 |
| Horry | 27,661 | 63.62 | 15,816 | 36.38 |
| Jasper | 2,048 | 61.80 | 1,266 | 38.20 |
| Kershaw | 7,648 | 56.06 | 5,995 | 43.94 |
| Lancaster | 7,056 | 49.41 | 7,225 | 50.59 |
| Laurens | 8,085 | 52.44 | 7,333 | 47.56 |
| Lee | 2,714 | 53.03 | 2,404 | 46.97 |
| Lexington | 37,149 | 62.47 | 22,318 | 37.53 |
| McCormick | 1,641 | 62.32 | 992 | 37.68 |
| Marion | 3,286 | 59.91 | 2,199 | 40.09 |
| Marlboro | 3,145 | 57.06 | 2,367 | 42.94 |
| Newberry | 5,065 | 52.10 | 4,657 | 47.90 |
| Oconee | 10,127 | 58.74 | 7,112 | 41.26 |
| Orangeburg | 12,364 | 59.81 | 8,308 | 40.19 |
| Pickens | 13,709 | 57.27 | 10,228 | 42.73 |
| Richland | 59,284 | 74.15 | 20,671 | 25.85 |
| Saluda | 2,674 | 49.95 | 2,679 | 50.05 |
| Spartanburg | 29,236 | 56.49 | 22,520 | 43.51 |
| Sumter | 12,878 | 62.96 | 7,575 | 37.04 |
| Union | 4,009 | 44.94 | 4,912 | 55.06 |
| Williamsburg | 4,578 | 54.64 | 3,800 | 45.36 |
| York | 22,854 | 65.26 | 12,165 | 34.74 |
| State total | 565,805 | 61.95 | 347,533 | 38.05 |

== Analysis and aftermath ==
An estimated 60% of white voters and 68% of Black voters supported the amendment. In a 2007 study published in the Du Bois Review, political scientists Micah Altman and Philip Klinker suggested that because the ballot title asked voters to repeal a ban, a double negative, it may have confused some voters.

=== Formalization ===
The amendment required a subsequent vote by the legislature in order to be ratified. Bill 332 of the 113th Session, which took effect on February 16, 1999, provided the needed ratification. This officially removed the state's marriage ban, which had been legally unenforceable for over 31 years due to the Supreme Court's decision in Loving v. Virginia.

=== Reactions to passage ===
An editorial released by The Herald described the fact more than one-third of the state opposed the amendment as "a black eye for the state." The same editorial hoped that those who opposed it were confused because of the double negative phrasing of the ballot title.

The Sun News also released an editorial after the amendment vote had occurred, saying that their concern lay with the fact that six counties had voted against the measure. The editorial went on to say, "The times, they are a'changing, but not fast enough." In February 1999, they released another paper following ratification of the amendment, declaring that the ban had been repealed, "And that is as it should be." The newspaper reasoned that it was a "Jim Crow part of the constitution" and "rightfully [was] expunged." It felt that South Carolina changed "all too slowly in things it needs to change quickly. But at least it is changing."

=== Turnout ===
The level of voter turnout in the November 1998 election in South Carolina was 54%, or about 1.1 million registered voters. This was viewed as encouraging by the South Carolina Election Commission, as this gave South Carolina the 29th highest voter turnout in this election, after years of the state having the lowest, or close to it, levels of turnout.

=== Other interracial marriage referendums ===
Results by county of the three referendums, including the year when it occurred at the top of each state. Yes: 80–90% 70–80% 60–70% 50–60%; No: 60–70%; 50–60%

Alabama and Mississippi also held referendums on repealing their own defunct constitutional bans, in which both measures succeeded. Mississippi held its plebiscite in 1987, which was approved by just 3.52%, and Alabama's was held in 2000, where about 19% more voted in favor than in opposition.

In comparison to South Carolina's vote, the two states had a higher percentage of county-level opposition, with 44 of the 82 Mississippi counties in opposition (53.66%) and 25 of Alabama's 67 (37.31%), while only 6 of South Carolina's 46 (13.04%) were opposed.

When categorized by race, estimates show that ~49% of white Alabama voters opposed removing their state's ban compared to South Carolina's ~40%. Among non-white voters, ~8% in Alabama opposed repeal, while in South Carolina, ~23% were against.

A map depicting Cherokee County, South Carolina, which voted against both gay and interracial marriage by the highest margins of any county in the state.

=== Same-sex marriage ===
The six counties in opposition later voted in favor of the state's referendum that constitutionally banned gay marriage. One of the six, Cherokee County, was the sole South Carolinian county to have more than 90% of its vote be in favor of the ban. The amendment was later compared to the gay marriage referendum, with The Times and Democrat saying that targeting same-sex couples was "no less vicious than targeting interracial couples was in another era."

=== Subsequent polling on interracial marriage ===
In 2011, the polling firm Public Policy Polling released a survey of 741 South Carolina voters, including the question: "Do you think interracial marriage should be legal or illegal?" The poll found that 70% believed it should be legal, 16% believed it should be illegal, and 15% were unsure. In 2012, the same organization, PPP, released a survey containing, this time, only "likely Republican primary voters". 66% were in favor of it being legal, 20% were opposed, and 14% were unsure.
