= Constitution of Mississippi =

American state constitution

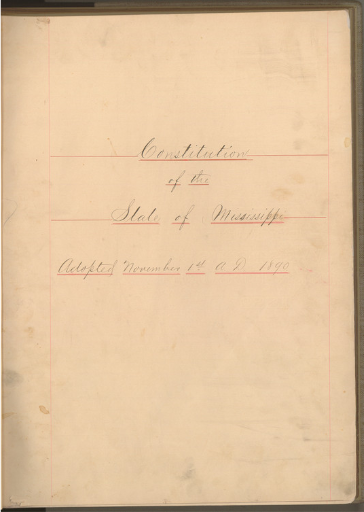
- Page one of the original copy of the Constitution

Overview
- Jurisdiction: State of Mississippi
- Created: November 1, 1890
- Date effective: November 1, 1890

Government structure
- Branches: 3
- Chambers: Bicameral
- Executive: Governor
- Judiciary: Supreme, appeals, chanceries, circuits

History
- First legislature: January 5, 1892
- First executive: January 20, 1896
- Amendments: 100
- Last amended: November 3, 2020
- Citation: The Constitution of the State of Mississippi (PDF), June 2013
- Location: William F. Winter Archives and History Building
- Commissioned by: Mississippi Legislature
- Author: Jackson Convention
- Signatories: 129 of the 134 delegates
- Supersedes: 1868 Constitution of Mississippi

Full text
- Mississippi Constitution at Wikisource

The Constitution of Mississippi is the primary organizing law for the U.S. state of Mississippi delineating the duties, powers, structures, and functions of the state government. Mississippi's original constitution was adopted at a constitutional convention held at Washington, Mississippi in advance of the western portion of the territory's admission to the Union in 1817. The current state constitution was adopted in 1890 following the reconstruction period. It has been amended and updated 100 times since its adoption in 1890, with some sections being changed or repealed altogether. The most recent modification to the constitution occurred in November 2020, when Section 140 was amended, and Sections 141-143 were repealed.

Since becoming a state, Mississippi has had four constitutions. The first one was used until 1832, when the second constitution was created and adopted. It ended property ownership as a prerequisite for voting, which was limited to free white males at the time. The third constitution, adopted in 1868 and ratified the following year, was the only constitution to be approved and ratified by the people of Mississippi at large and bestowed state citizenship to all of Mississippi's residents, for the first time including newly-freed slaves. The fourth constitution was adopted on November 1, 1890, and was created by a convention consisting mostly of Democrats in order to prevent the state's African-American citizens from voting. The provisions preventing them from voting were repealed in 1975.

While the state constitution adopted in 1890 is still in effect today, many of its original tenets and sections have since been modified or repealed; some of these may have been in response to U.S. Supreme Court rulings such as Harper v. Virginia. In the decades since its adoption, several Mississippi governors have advocated replacing the constitution, however, despite heated debates in the legislature in the 1930s and 1950s, such attempts to replace the constitution have so far proved unsuccessful.

== Background ==
Mississippi held constitutional conventions in 1851 and 1861 about secession. A few months before the start of the American Civil War in April 1861, Mississippi, a slave state located in the Southern United States, declared that it had seceded from the United States and joined the newly formed Confederacy, and it subsequently lost its representation in the U.S. Congress.

Four years later, with the victory of Union forces at the end of the American Civil War, slavery was abolished via the newly enacted Thirteenth Amendment. Mississippi held a constitutional convention in 1865. A new Mississippi constitution was created in May 1868 that bestowed citizenship and civil rights upon newly freed slaves in the state. Mississippi regained its congressional representation after it was fully readmitted back into the United States in February 1870.

The 1868 state constitution, which was the third constitution that the State of Mississippi's history, lasted until 1890, when after the Compromise of 1877 and a lengthy campaign of terrorist violence to establish Democratic rule in the state succeeded, a constitutional convention composed almost entirely of white Democrats created and adopted the fourth (and current) constitution to specifically disenfranchise, isolate, and marginalize the state's African American population. Unlike the 1868 constitution, the 1890 one did not go to the people of the state at large for their approval and ratification. The convention created, approved, and ratified it all on its own initiative, as was done in the case of the 1817 and 1832 state constitutions.

The new constitution was utilized by the Democrats and the state government, in conjunction with terrorist violence, to marginalize and prohibit black Mississippians from participating in the state's civil society until the 1960s and 1970s.

Mississippi was not the only U.S. state at the time that created a new constitution specifically for the purpose of disenfranchising their African American voters; other ones did as well, South Carolina followed suit in December 1895 under its Democratic governor in replacing its 1868 state constitution. As with Mississippi's current 1890 constitution, the 1895 South Carolinian constitution is still in use today.

The 1890 constitution effectively granted the Democrat-controlled Mississippi government free rein to prevent almost all African Americans from voting and casting ballots, in addition to forcing them to attend separate schools (almost always deliberately of substandard quality), forbidding them to marry people of other ethnic groups, or bear arms for self-defense. In the 1950s and 1960s, following investigations by the United States government, these discriminatory provisions were ruled by the U.S. Supreme Court to have violated the rights guaranteed to American citizens under the tenets of the U.S. Constitution, thus rendering them legally unenforceable. However, it would take 20 years to formally remove them from the state's constitution, which was done when they were finally repealed in the 1970s and 1980s by the state government, nearly a century after they were enacted.

There have been legislative efforts to replace the Mississippi constitution that was adopted in 1890 (which has since had over 100 subsequent modifications and amendments) with a new one - notably in the 1930s and 1950s - but ultimately, such efforts have been unsuccessful as of 2021.

Several Mississippi politicians have opined in favor of a replacement of the 1890 constitution, on the grounds that it is morally repugnant due to its discriminatory history, and have noted it contains clauses detrimental to the state's monetary commerce and businesses enacted by Democrats to prevent private companies from out of state hiring African-American workers in Mississippi, one of the vestiges of the segregationist era.

=== 1817 Constitution ===
The 1817 constitution was The first constitution of Mississippi was passed when the state joined the Union in 1817. It was replaced in 1832 by a new state constitution, which then was used until 1868.

=== 1832 Constitution ===
The 1832 state constitution was in effect until 1868, and removed the requirement that voters must own property to cast ballots. However, the right to vote and run for elected office was restricted to white men only. African Americans and women were still prohibited from voting in the state or being elected into office under this constitution (until 1868 and 1920 respectively). The 1832 constitution was the last state constitution of Mississippi that was used while slavery was still legal in the United States. It was superseded in 1868, three years after the abolition of slavery, when it was replaced by a new constitution.

One notable aspect of the 1832 constitution was that it prohibited importing slaves into Mississippi from other states after May 1, 1833. Some buyers of slaves then defaulted on their obligations to slave traders, arguing that the debt was voided by the law. The Taney Court upheld the obligation to pay the slave traders in Groves v. Slaughter, and Rowan v. Runnels.

==== Judiciary ====
The constitution changed how judges were chosen, with them being elected and no longer appointed, as defined in Article IV.

==== Dueling ====
Dueling, which was a somewhat common occurrence in the early 19th century United States, such as the one between Alexander Hamilton and Aaron Burr that resulted in the death of Hamilton, was now outlawed under the 1832 state constitution. The new constitution even required politicians to deliver an affirmation that they would not engage in a duel:

The legislature shall pass such laws to prevent the evil practice of duelling as they may deem necessary, and may require all officers before they enter on the duties of their respective offices, to take the following oath or affirmation: "I do solemnly swear (or affirm, as they case may be) that I have not been engaged in a duel, by sending or accepting a challenge to fight a duel, or by fighting a duel since the first day of January, in the year of our Lord one thousand eight hundred and thirty-three, nor will I be so engaged during my continuance in office. So help me God.

— Section 2, Article VII, General Provisions, Mississippi Constitution of 1832.

==== Term limits ====
Term limits were set for elected offices under the 1838 constitution, and exist today.

==== Slavery ====
The 1832 constitution, like the 1817 one that preceded it, prohibited the Mississippi Legislature from passing any laws designed to set free people from slavery, unless the slave had committed a "distinguished" deed to the benefit of the state, or had the consent of the owner, who was to be monetarily compensated for the emancipation of the slave:

The legislature shall have no power to pass laws for the emancipation of slaves without the consent of their owners, unless where the slave shall have rendered to the state some distinguished service, in which case the owner shall be paid a full equivalent for the slave so emancipated.

— Section 1, Article VII, General Provisions, Mississippi Constitution of 1832.

This retaining of this clause from the 1817 to the 1832 constitution reflected the course of Southern popular opinion at the time, in which laws that restricted state legislatures from ending slavery in their states, by making it impossible without the full consent of slave-owners, were passed or retained, or laws that made it more difficult for slave-owners to set their slaves free were also passed. As noted by future Republican U.S. president Abraham Lincoln in an 1857 speech regarding the Dred Scott decision:

In those days, as I understand, masters could, at their own pleasure, emancipate their slaves; but since then, such legal restraints have been made upon emancipation, as to amount almost to prohibition. In those days, Legislatures held the unquestioned power to abolish slavery in their respective States; but now it is becoming quite fashionable for State Constitutions to withhold that power from the Legislatures. In those days, by common consent, the spread of the black man's bondage to new countries was prohibited.

— Abraham Lincoln, Speech at Springfield, Illinois (June 26, 1857).

This represented a shift in ideology regarding the moral nature of slavery after the Missouri Compromise of 1820, in which many people began to see slavery not as a "great evil" as they did in the late 18th century, but rather, in the words of 19th century South Carolinian Democrat John C. Calhoun, a "positive good". As a result of this shift, laws began to be passed throughout Southern slave states that restricted the emancipation of slaves, something that was somewhat common during the late 18th century around the time of the American Revolution, where slave owners such as Edward Coles and Robert Carter freed their slaves using the American Enlightenment principles of the colonial revolutionaries as their inspiration. Abraham Lincoln noticed this shift in ideology, writing in an 1855 letter to a friend that:

Our progress in degeneracy appears to me to be pretty rapid. As a nation, we began by declaring that 'all men are created equal'. We now practically read it 'all men are created equal, except negroes'. When the Know-Nothings get control, it will read 'all men are created equal, except negroes, and foreigners, and catholics'. When it comes to this I should prefer emigrating to some country where they make no pretence of loving liberty — to Russia, for instance, where despotism can be take pure, and without the base alloy of hypocracy [sic].

— Abraham Lincoln, letter to Joshua Speed (August 24, 1855).

This shift in opinion hardened Southerners' and Democrats' actions in the defense of the institution of slavery, ultimately culminating in the American Civil War, which would end slavery in the United States forever.

=== 1868 Constitution ===
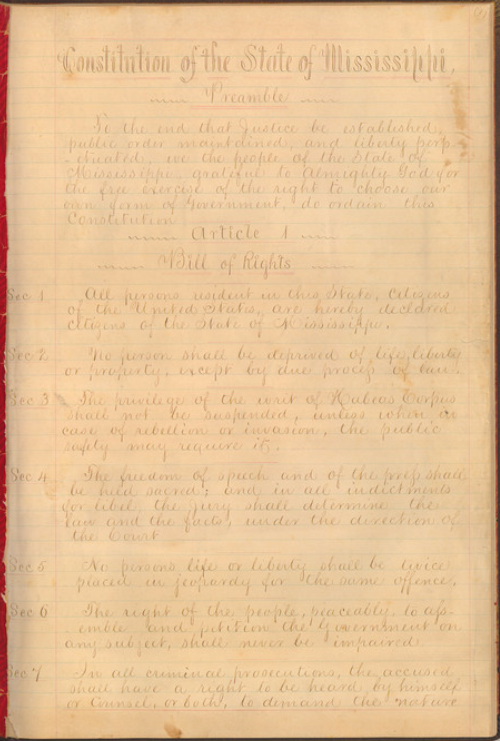
Page one of the original copy of the 1868 Constitution, showing the preamble and first seven sections of the first article.

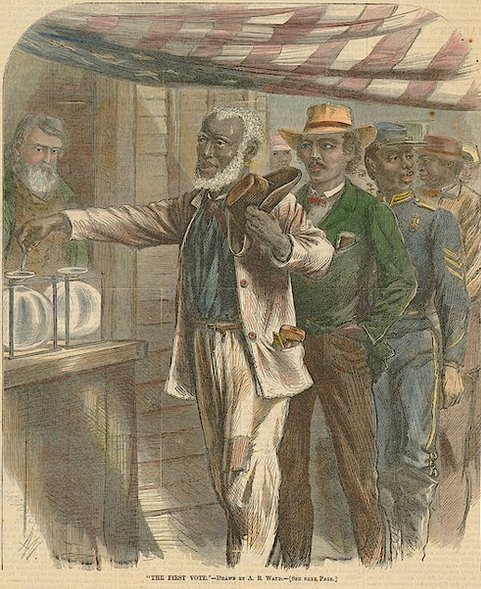
With the Confederacy defeated by the Union at the end of the American Civil War, slavery was ended and outlawed throughout the United States. The former Confederate states adopted new state constitutions, which granted newly freed slaves and African Americans the right to vote for the first time. An 1867 drawing in Harper's Weekly lauds the Union victory by showing freed slaves and U.S. Colored Troops veterans exercising their newly bestowed right to vote by casting ballots for the first time.

The 1868 constitution was adopted on May 15, 1868, and approved and ratified by the people of the state a year later on December 1, 1869. This was unlike the 1890 constitution that replaced it 22 years, for that constitution was completely created and approved by a convention. In use for 22 years, the 1868 constitution was the first in the history of the state to have been approved by popular consent, when it was sent to the people at large for their ratification. It was also the first state constitution of Mississippi to have been created by both African American and white delegates. The 1868 constitution banned slavery, which had been legal under the two previous state constitutions, extended citizenship, the right of voting and bearing arms to black men, established public schools for all children in the state for the first time in its history, prohibited double jeopardy in legal proceedings, and protected the rights of property ownership for married women.

Despite this, Southern Democrats, supported by the Northern Democratic Party, were vehemently opposed to any basic civil rights for black Mississippians (indeed, for black Southerners in general) regardless of their level of education or professional credentials. However, they acquiesced to the enactment of the 1868 constitution on the proviso that the U.S. Army's occupation of Mississippi, which prevented a violent Democratic takeover of the state, would end following a Democrat ascending to the U.S. presidency later in the year. However, this deal fell through as the Republican candidate, Ulysses S. Grant, won the U.S. presidential election of 1868 and was re-elected in 1872.

When Mississippi was fully readmitted back into the United States in February 1870, it did so on the prerequisite specified by the U.S. Congress in the 1870 Act to admit the State of Mississippi, that the state not change or replace its 1868 constitution for the purpose of disenfranchising segments of its voting population, such as freed slaves. However, this agreement eventually went unheeded.

In 1876, the Democrats regained the governorship and state legislature of Mississippi. In 1890, the 1868 constitution was replaced by a new constitution by a convention consisting overwhelmingly of white Democrats, which effectively disenfranchised African-American voters in the State of Mississippi for the next eight decades.

The very first article of the post-war 1868 constitution was Article 1, also known as the Bill of Rights. Borrowing many tenets from the United States Bill of Rights, it specified the rights that all residents of the state held.

==== Preamble ====
The 1868 constitution's preamble stated the purpose of the constitution's creation and adoption, which was given as, the establishment and perpetuation of "justice", "public order", "right", "liberty" and "freedom":

To the end that justice be established, public order maintained, and liberty perpetuated, we, the people of the State of Mississippi, grateful to Almighty God for the free exercise of the right to choose our own form of government, do ordain this Constitution.

— Preamble, Mississippi Constitution of 1868 (May 15, 1868).

This differed from the wording of the 1890 state constitution that replaced it, in which any and all references to "justice", "public order", "liberty", "right" and "freedom" were completely removed from the preamble by the convention's delegates. The words "in Convention assembled" appear after "the people of Mississippi", whereas the 1868 one was:

We, the people of Mississippi, in Convention assembled, grateful to Almighty God, and invoking His blessing on our work, do ordain and establish this Constitution.

— Preamble, Mississippi Constitution of 1890 (November 1, 1890).

==== Citizenship ====
The very first section of the state constitution's Bill of Rights section determined who was a citizen of the state. The section declared that "all persons" who lived within the borders of the State of Mississippi were its citizens. This extended citizenship to all persons who lived in the state, regardless of their gender or color:

All persons resident in this State, citizens of the United States, are hereby declared citizens of the State of Mississippi.

— Section 1, Article 1, Mississippi Constitution of 1868 (May 15, 1868)

==== Slavery ====
With the defeat of the Confederacy at the hands of the Union in the American Civil War, the Thirteenth Amendment was ratified to outlaw slavery throughout the United States. As a result, the 1868 constitution of Mississippi was the state's first one to ban slavery throughout the state:

There shall be neither slavery nor involuntary servitude in this State, otherwise than in the punishment of crime, whereof the party shall have been duly convicted.

— Section 19, Article 1, Mississippi Constitution of 1868 (May 15, 1868).

== History ==
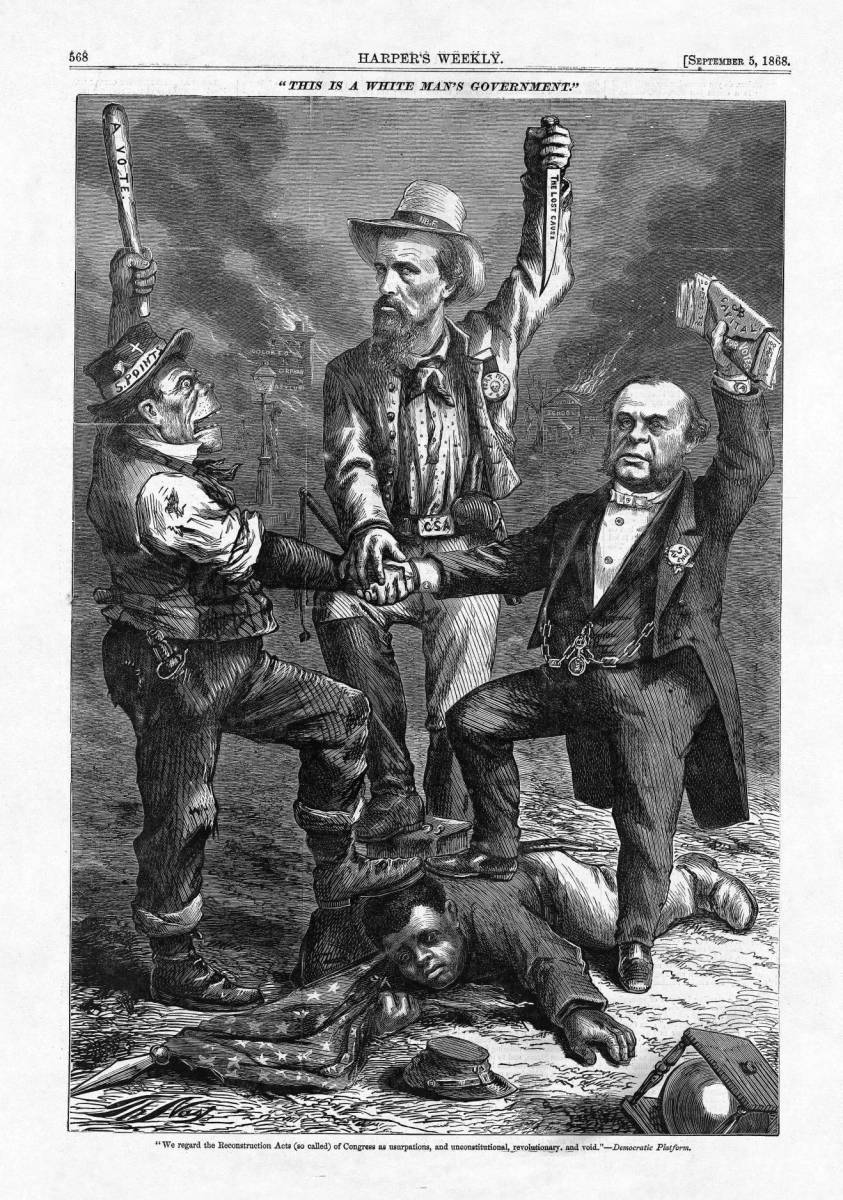
During much of the late 19th and early 20th centuries, Democrats, calling themselves "The White Man's Party", sought to violently disenfranchise African Americans in the name of white supremacy, by using party-sponsored paramilitaries and terrorist organizations such as the "Red Shirts". Using as their party slogan, "This is a White Man's Country!", the Democrats opposed the Republican-sponsored "Reconstruction Acts", which required that the former Confederate states adopt the Fourteenth Amendment and respect the right of African Americans to vote if they were to fully rejoin the United States. An 1868 political cartoon from Harper's Weekly, showing a former Confederate soldier and two Democrats triumphantly standing on the back of a U.S. Colored Troops veteran, condemns and criticizes the Democrats' efforts.

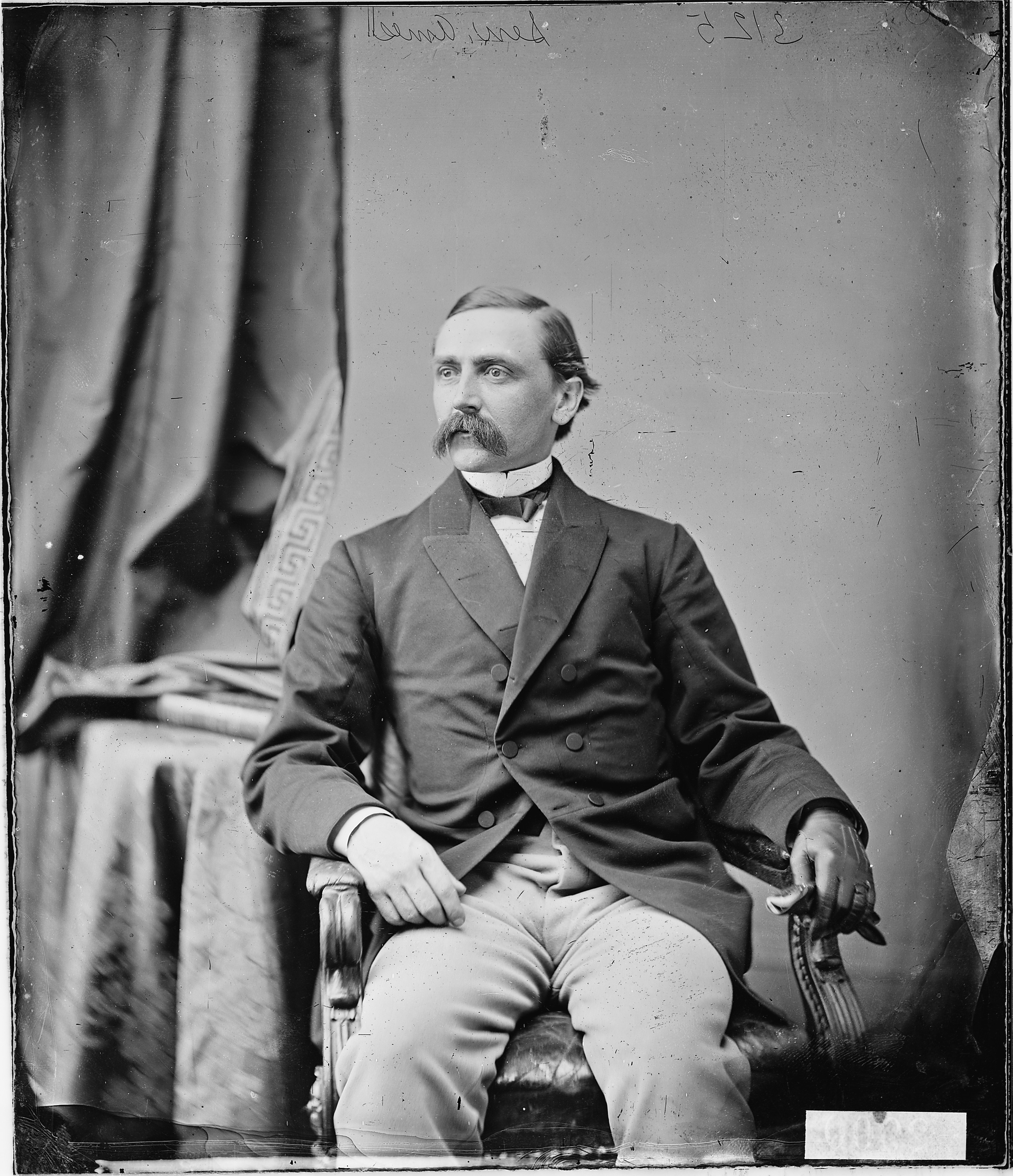
Adelbert Ames was Mississippi's last Republican governor in the 19th century, leaving office in 1876 after a fraud-wrought election the previous year in which many black and Republican voters were violently kept from the polls by terrorists. Ames resigned several months later, amid threats of impeachment by a hostile Democrat-controlled state legislature. He was the last Republican governor of Mississippi in the 19th century and for much of the 20th century as well. A Republican would not become governor of Mississippi again until 1992; more than 115 years after Ames's tenure had ended.

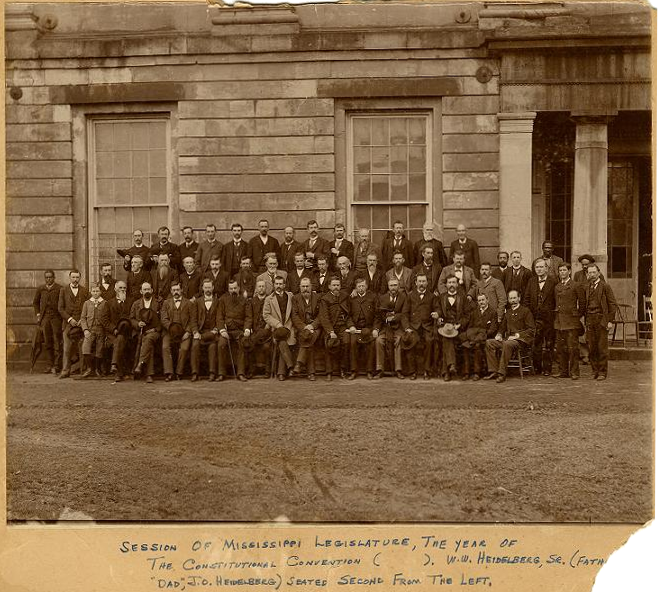
The legislature of the State of Mississippi, in 1890.

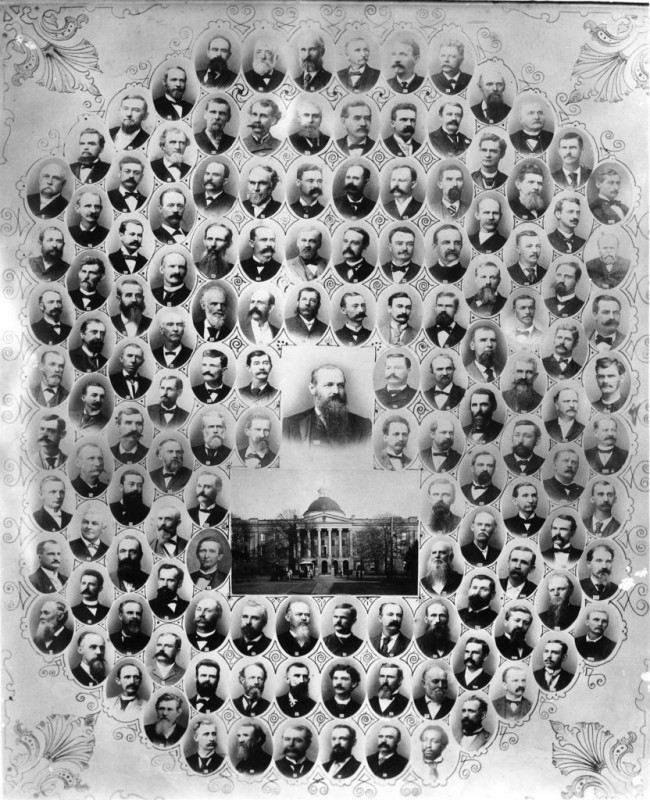
A poster showing the members of the 1890 Mississippi constitution convention.

The current constitution of Mississippi was adopted on November 1, 1890, having replaced the 1868 constitution that had been adopted and ratified following the end of the American Civil War to bestow freedoms and civil rights upon newly freed slaves.

=== Drafting ===
On February 5, 1890, the Democratic-dominated Mississippi Legislature voted to call a convention to replace the 1868 constitution. On March 11, 1890, Mississippi's Democratic governor, John M. Stone, declared that on July 29 an election was to be held to select delegates to attend the constitutional convention, which would begin in August. However, as the state government was solidly controlled by the Democrats by this point, the result of the delegate election was that of the constitutional convention's 134 delegates that were elected, 133 were white, and only one was African American, despite the state having a majority African-American population of 58 percent.

During the convention, which took place in Jackson and began on August 12, 1890, running through November 1, several issues were discussed, ranging from the construction of levees in the flood-prone Mississippi Delta to the regulations of railroads. However, the most important issue, indeed, the primary cause, catalyst and reasoning for why the convention had been called into being in the first place, were the implementation of "literacy tests" and "poll taxes" as prerequisites for voting, the intended subjective enforcement of which would disenfranchise virtually nearly every African American in the state for decades. This was something that did not exist under the 1868 constitution. Although the wording mandating the tests ostensibly implied that they were to be applied equally to all persons, the convention desired to subjectively enforce these literacy tests and poll taxes to prevent African Americans voters from casting ballots. According to the convention's delegates, some of whom were former Confederates, Black suffrage was an effort to "pull down civilization".

Indeed, according to the president of the 1890 constitutional convention, Solomon S. Calhoon, a judge from Hinds County, the convention was called specifically to disenfranchise the state's African American voters, restrict their rights and isolate and segregate them from the rest of society. He unabashedly stated that a constitution not doing this was unacceptable to the convention's members:

Let's tell the truth if it bursts the bottom of the Universe. ... We came here to exclude the Negro. Nothing short of this will answer. (emphasis added)

Another delegate, Bolivar County planter George P. Melchior, reiterated this view:

It is the manifest intention of this Convention to secure to the State of Mississippi, 'white supremacy'. (emphasis added)

One opposing delegate, William T. Martin, a former Confederate general and lawyer from Adams County, continued this train of thought of the convention's members:

What are you here for, if not to maintain white supremacy? (emphasis added)

The primary reasoning behind the desire of Democrats in Mississippi and other Southern U.S. states to disenfranchise their black voting populations was their overwhelmingly voting for Republican candidates and installing them into office, a result which Democrats referred to pejoratively as "the menace of Negro domination" or "Negro supremacy". During the time, the official policy of Democrats throughout the country was to implement patriarchal white supremacy as much as and as far as possible, using as its party slogans, "This is a White Man's Country: Let the White Man Rule!" and "This is a White Man's Government!" As one South Carolinian politician said in 1909, the Democratic Party existed for "one plank and only one plank, namely, that this is a white man's country and the white men must govern it." It even referred to itself as "The White Man's Party".

Due to Mississippi's large African American population, which comprised nearly 58 percent of the state's total population at the time, many Republican candidates would have been elected into office in most elections, were they free and fair and held without outside interference from white supremacist terrorists and Democrat-sponsored paramilitaries. The second reason for the desire of the Democrats to disfranchise and marginalize black Mississippians was due to the profound ideology of virulent bigotry and prejudice that the Democrats held towards African Americans, whom they looked upon in contempt and held in low regard. The Democrats justified their bigoted views regarding African Americans using a mixture of pseudo-scientific racism and a discredited alternative misinterpretation of the Bible.

During the convention, one delegate, A.J. Paxton, suggested adding a clause into the new state constitution that African Americans be explicitly forbidden from holding office in the state at all, by adding into the constitution a clause stating that "No negro, or person having as much as one-eighth negro blood, shall hold office in this State." However, since this would have been a blatant and overt violation of the United States Constitution, it was not included in the final draft. The convention decided to use more subtly-worded methods to effectively obtain that result.

Another delegate, T.V. Noland, a lawyer from Wilkinson County, suggested introducing into the constitution a clause forbidding marriages between a "white or Caucasian" person with a person of that of the "Negro or Mongolian race". He stated that they add into the constitution that "the intermarriage of a person of the white or Caucasian race, with a person of the negro or Mongolian race, is prohibited in this State." A slightly modified version of this proposed clause was included into the completed constitution, with "Mongolian race" being replaced with that of a person having "one-eighth or more of negro blood".

In an 1896 ruling, the Mississippi Supreme Court delivered a legal opinion regarding the justification and reasoning the Democrats had used for the adoption of the 1890 constitution in Ratliff v. Beale, and how it came to be. The court stated that the purpose of the 1890 convention was to "obstruct the exercise of the franchise by the negro race". In the comments, the court admitted that the provisions of the Mississippi state constitution had violated the United States Constitution, but did not order that they be removed or modified. Instead, the court praised the 1890 constitution, saying that it was morally and legally justified and necessary due to the "peculiarities" that all African Americans allegedly held, which it went on to describe. The court stated that African Americans were "criminal members" who were prone to committing "furtive offenses" and thus, should not be allowed to vote in the state. The court also praised the terrorist violence that resulted in the Democrats taking control of the state, saying it justified and necessary because the Democrat members of "the white race" were "superior in spirit, in governmental instinct, and in intelligence":

This was succeeded by a semimilitary, semicivil uprising, under which the white race, inferior in number, but superior in spirit, in governmental instinct, and in intelligence, was restored to power. ... The federal constitution prohibited the adoption of any laws under which a discrimination should be made by reason of race, color, or previous condition of servitude. ... Within the field of permissible action under the limitations imposed by the federal constitution, the convention swept the circle of expedients to obstruct the exercise of the franchise by the negro race. By reason of its previous condition of servitude and dependence, this race had acquired or accentuated certain peculiarities of habit, of temperament, and of character, which clearly distinguished it as a race from that of the whites,-a patient, docile people, but careless, landless, and migratory within narrow limits, without forethought, and its criminal members given rather to furtive offenses than to the robust crimes of the whites. Restrained by the federal constitution from discriminating against the negro race, the convention discriminated against its characteristics and the offenses to which its weaker members were prone. ... But it must be remembered that our constitution was never submitted to the people. It was put in operation by the body which framed it, and therefore the question is what that body meant by the language used. ... In our opinion, the clause was primarily intended by the framers of the constitution as a clog upon the franchise, and secondarily and incidentally only as a means of revenue.

— Supreme Court of the State of Mississippi, Ratliff v. Beale, 20 So. 865 (1896)

Due to their profound bigotry and prejudice, Mississippi Democrats viewed the concept of African Americans, whom they considered to be profoundly ignorant and immoral and incapable of improvement, voting, as being detrimental to their party's interests and the well-being of the state. In addition, the Democrats did not want to adjust their policies to better suit the interests of the state's African American constituents, nor did they desire to abandon their bigoted views and see them treated with dignity and respect on an equal footing. As a result, total and massive African American disenfranchisement was the only option that the state's Democrats saw as being preferable to their party's interests.

As J.B. Chrisman, a judge from Lincoln County, Mississippi remarked, in salutatory praise of the 1890 constitution, marginalizing and disenfranchising African Americans was seen as a kind of social badge of honor for Southern Democratic men:

My God! My God! Is there to be no higher ambition for the young white men of the south than that of keeping the Negro down? (emphasis added)

The State of Mississippi was not alone at the time for creating adopting entirely new constitutions specifically for the purpose of disenfranchising and marginalizing African-American voters. Other Southern U.S. states, such as South Carolina, under its Democratic governor Benjamin Tillman, created and adopted a new state constitution in 1895, five years after Mississippi did the same. As with Mississippi's 1890 constitution, the South Carolina constitution of 1895 is still in effect today. Oklahoma, which was not a state until 1907 (but where slavery had been practiced before the Thirteenth Amendment) adopted similar laws upon statehood.

The convention that created the 1890 constitution consisted of 134 delegates, of which 133 were white. The fact there was only one black delegate was in stark contrast with the state population of Mississippi, which was nearly 58 percent African American.

Convention president

The convention's president was Solomon S. Calhoon, a judge from Hinds County, Mississippi and later a member of the state's supreme court. Born in January 1838, Calhoon had been a newspaper editor before the American Civil War started. When the war broke out over the expansion of slavery into western U.S. territories, Calhoon joined the Confederate army and ultimately became a lieutenant colonel. Like most former Confederates and Democrats at the time, Calhoon was a fervent believer in patriarchal white supremacy and was vehemently opposed to any basic civil rights for African Americans. In 1890, Calhoon wrote a pamphlet entitled Negro Suffrage, in which he outlined his opinions regarding African American voting in the state. He described Afica as having "no advancement, no invention, no history, no literature, no governmental polity. ... only ignorance, slavery, cannibalism, no respect for women, no respect for anything" and called blacks "not inventive, not progressive, not resourceful, not energetic" and stated his firm opinion that "Negro suffrage is an evil, and an evil to both races."

During the convention, Calhoon reiterated the views he had written in his pamphlet in an oratory delivered to the convention's members, saying that allowing African Americans to vote would lead to the "ruin" of the state:

The negro race seems unable to maintain even its own imitative acquirements. It seems unfit to rule. Its rule seems to mean, as it has always meant, stagnation, the enslavement of woman, the brutilization of man, animal savagery, universal ruin.

— Sol S. Calhoon, Mississippi Constitutional Convention of 1890 (1890)

Due to his prominent judicial position on the state's supreme court, any judicial challenges to the 1890 constitution that could have been brought forth to the court would have been rejected by him. Calhoon died in November 1908.

Republicans

132 of the delegates at the convention were white Democrats, who were determined in their efforts to restrict and infringe upon the rights of black Mississippians.

Marsh Cook, a white Republican from Jasper County who supported African American voting, attempted to join the convention despite receiving death threats for attempting to do so. For supporting the right of black Mississippians to vote in the state's elections, Cook was lynched and killed on a remote rural road, a common fate for many who opposed the Democrats at the time.

African Americans

The only black member of the 1890 constitutional convention was Isaiah Montgomery from Mound Bayou, whom white Democrats invited to the convention because he had been a former slave of Confederate president Jefferson Davis's brother, and he was willing to support their desires of total African-American voter disenfranchisement.

Montgomery delivered a speech at the convention advocating black disenfranchisement to the approval of the Democrats, but much to the outrage of his black peers, who labelled him a "traitor" and likened him to Judas Iscariot.

=== Adoption ===
Originally containing fourteen articles upon its adoption on November 1, 1890, Mississippi's 1890 state constitution enlarged the powers of the state government and was longer than the 1868 one it replaced, which only had thirteen articles.

=== Revisions and proposals ===
A constitutional amendment creating an initiative system was passed by the state legislature and approved by voters in 1914, and was inserted into the constitution in 1916, as the legislature was required to wait until its next regular session to insert ratified constitutional amendments. The state Supreme Court upheld the referendum system in 1917, but overturned it in 1922, making it the first time the court ruled a constitutional amendment unconstitutional. Justice George H. Ethridge, whose vote change in the rulings swung the results, stated in 1925 that "This system upsets our carefully worked out scheme for white control of the Legislature and the state officers". In 1988, a group of state legislators made up of Oliver E. Diaz Jr., Isiah Fredericks, Stephen Hale, Ayres Haxton, Diane Peranich, John Reeves, Thomas Reynolds II, Ed Ryan, Margaret Tate, Dewayne Thomas, Rey Vecchio, and Bill Wheeler planned on bringing a test case to restore the referendum process. Their petition was for a referendum to hold a constitution convention to rewrite the state's constitution, but they failed to receive the required 7,500 signatures. The group submitted another petition with 8,100 signatures in 1990, to remove the constitution's ban on state lottery system and it was rejected by Secretary of State Dick Molpus. Attorney General Mike Moore filed a lawsuit against Molpus in Hinds County Circuit Court on March 28, to allow the referendum to appear on the ballot. Molpus supported the creation of a referendum system, but opposed the petition stating that the signature requirement was too low, as 7,500 signatures accounted for less than 1% of the voters, and instead supported having the signature requirement be 8% of registered voters. The circuit court ruled against Moore on June 29, and the Mississippi Supreme Court ruled unanimously to uphold its decision on April 3, 1991. State Senator Rick Lambert sponsored legislation supported by Molpus to create a referendum system that required signatures from equaled to 10% of the votes in the most recent gubernatorial election.

Governor James P. Coleman called for the creation of a new constitution in 1957, but was unsuccessful despite calling a special legislative session. Former Governor Bill Waller, Governor William Allain, Secretary of State Molpus, Attorney General Edwin L. Pittman, Auditor Ray Mabus, and Treasurer Bill Cole called for a new constitution in the 1980s. In 1985, Allain formed a commission, with Coleman as its chair, to study the state's constriction. Allain appointed more than three hundred people to the commission with nine committees that focused on the executive branch, legislative branch, county government, economic development, municipal government, judicial, agriculture and forestry, higher education, and elementary and secondary education.

== Influences ==
Following the end of the American Civil War in 1865, Mississippi elections were wrought with deadly violence and voter intimidation as white supremacist terrorist organizations such as the "Red Shirts" used armed force and violent terrorism in order to prevent black voters and their white allies opposed to the Democrats, from casting ballots for the Republicans. Many Republicans, black Mississippians, and their white allies, such as Print Matthews, were lynched and murdered by armed Democratic paramilitaries as a result.

Although slavery may have been legally ended by the Thirteenth Amendment, the ideology that the Confederates and Democrats had used to justify it did not, with it now being used by them as the rationale to deny the freed slaves and African Americans basic civil rights and freedoms. As former abolitionist Frederick Douglass noted in a December 1869 speech delivered in Boston, Massachusetts:

Southern gentlemen who led in the late rebellion have not parted with their convictions at this point, any more than at any other. They want to be independent of the negro. They believed in slavery and they believe in it still. They believed in an aristocratic class, and they believe in it still, and though they have lost slavery, one element essential to such a class, they still have two important conditions to the reconstruction of that class. They have intelligence, and they have land. Of these, the land is the more important. They cling to it with all the tenacity of a cherished superstition. They will neither sell to the negro, nor let the carpet-bagger have it in peace, but are determined to hold it for themselves and their children forever. They have not yet learned that when a principle is gone, the incident must go also; that what was wise and proper under slavery is foolish and mischievous in a state of general liberty; that the old bottles are worthless when the new wine has come; but they have found that land is a doubtful benefit, where there're no hands to till it.

— Frederick Douglass, Our Composite Nationality (December 7, 1869), emphasis added, Boston, Massachusetts.

In the years following the American Civil War, forces of the U.S. Army were stationed in the readmitted Southern U.S. states, protecting the lives and rights of African Americans and freed slaves. The Democrats were vehemently opposed to the presence of the U.S. military being there, for it prevented a violent Democratic takeover of said states. However, there were not enough army soldiers to be everywhere at all times, and, as such, although they could supervise voter registration to be fair and impartial, they could not protect freedmen as they went to and from the voter registration office to register, which resulted in many freedmen being lynched. With violence against freedmen increasing, the Civil Rights Act of 1875 was signed into law by Republican U.S. president Ulysses S. Grant to protect them. However, that law would be short-lived, as the U.S. Supreme Court ruled it unconstitutional in 1883.

In August 1877, former U.S. president Ulysses S. Grant, who had left office several months prior and was embarking on a tour of the world, wrote in a letter from London to U.S. Navy officer Daniel Ammen after the Compromise of 1877, about the contradictions of the Democrats in their vocal support for using overwhelming military force to quell workers' strikes, but objecting when it was used to defend the rights of African American voters from being infringed upon. He stated that the U.S. government should protect the rights of all its citizens from being infringed upon, regardless of their color:

During my two terms of office the whole Democratic press, and the morbidly honest and 'reformatory' portion of the Republican press, thought it horrible to keep U.S. troops stationed in the Southern States, and when they were called upon to protect the lives of negroes – as much citizens under the Constitution as if their skins were white – the country was scarcely large enough to hold the sound of indignation belched forth by them for some years. Now, however, there is no hesitation about exhausting the whole power of the government to suppress a strike on the slightest intimation that danger threatens. All parties agree that this is right, and so do I. If a negro insurrection should arise in South Carolina, Mississippi, or Louisiana, or if the negroes in either of these states, where they are in a large majority, should intimidate the whites from going to the polls, or from exercising any of the rights of American citizens, there would be no division of sentiment as to the duty of the president. It does seem the rule should work both ways. (emphasis added)

By 1890, following years of terrorism and paramilitary violence, African Americans had "largely disappeared from the arena of Southern politics". The Democrats had wrested control of Mississippi state's government to rid it of the Republican Party's influences, with the state's last 19th century Republican governor, Adelbert Ames, resigning from office in 1876 due to threats of impeachment by a hostile legislature. The previous year, in November 1875, terrorists and Democrats had forcibly kept many black and Republican voters from going to the state's polls in a fraud-wrought election, using armed violence. This resulted in the Democrats gaining control of the Mississippi Legislature.

With the ascension of Rutherford B. Hayes to the U.S. presidency and the subsequent Compromise of 1877, a Southern Democrat was appointed to the U.S. cabinet and the U.S. Army's forces were withdrawn from public and confined to their bases, leaving 1,155 soldiers by 1879. This effectively removed the last obstacle preventing the Democrats from violently taking over said states and disenfranchising African American voters and marked the effective end of the Republican Party in the states of the former Confederacy for nearly a century.

The state government of Mississippi, now controlled mostly by the Democrats, decided to bring to an end their campaigns of terrorist violence designed to disenfranchise the black voting population of the state, by using other methods to do so. However, rather than using solely terrorism to disenfranchise black voters and their white allies, the Democrats decided to use the law to do so, by enshrining into the state constitutions provisions that would allow them to do just that. They set their sights on replacing the 1868 constitution of Mississippi, which legally guaranteed freedoms, citizenship, enfranchisement and other human rights to black citizens, to which both Northern and Southern Democrats were vehemently opposed.

== Original frame ==
The organization of the current Mississippi Constitution is laid out in a Preamble and 15 Articles. Each Article is subdivided into Sections. However, the Section numbering does not restart between Articles; Sections 1 and 2 are in Article 1 while Article 2 began with Section 3 (since repealed). As such, newly added Sections are given alpha characters after the number (such as Section 26A in Article 3)

=== Preamble ===
We, the people of Mississippi in convention assembled, grateful to Almighty God, and invoking his blessing on our work, do ordain and establish this Constitution.

=== Article 1 ===
Article 1 defines and protects the separation of powers into legislative, executive and judicial.

=== Article 2 ===
Article 2 formerly defined the state boundaries; after the 1990 repeal of section 3, the legislature holds the power to define the state boundaries.

=== Article 3 ===
Some of the rights defined in Article 3 are same or similar to the rights to those that are found in the United States Bill of Rights.

Unique additions to the 1890 Mississippi constitution include Section 7 (denying the state the ability to secede from the United States, carried over from the 1868 constitution), Section 12 (explicitly permitting regulation of concealed carry weapons, which was not included in the 1868 constitution) and Sections 26, 26A and 29 (on conditions for grand jury and bail necessitated by the war on drugs).

Section 12 allows for the ownership of weapons by the state's residents, however, the state government is given the power to regulate or prohibit the carrying of concealed weapons. This differs from the 1868 constitution, which did not grant the state the power to restrict that right. The section states:

The right of every citizen to keep and bear arms in defense of his home, person, or property, or in aid of the civil power when thereto legally summoned, shall not be called in question, but the legislature may regulate or forbid carrying concealed weapons.

Section 15, carried over verbatim from the 1868 constitution, forbids slavery or involuntary servitude within the state, except when done as a punishment for a crime:

There shall be neither slavery nor involuntary servitude in this state, otherwise than in the punishment of crime, whereof the party shall have been duly convicted.

— Section 15

Section 18 discusses freedom of religion. It prohibits religious tests as a qualification for officeholders. It also contains a unique clause which states that this right shall not be construed as to justify acts of licentiousness or exclude the use of the Bible from any public school:

No religious test as a qualification for office shall be required; and no preference shall be given by law to any religious sect or mode of worship; but the free enjoyment of all religious sentiments and the different modes of worship shall be held sacred. The rights hereby secured shall not be construed to justify acts of licentiousness injurious to morals or dangerous to the peace and safety of the state, or to exclude the Holy Bible from use in any public school of this state.

Section 19 originally banned duelling:

Human life shall not be imperiled by the practice of dueling; and any citizen of this state who shall hereafter fight a duel, or assist in the same as second, or send, accept, or knowingly carry a challenge therefor, whether such an act be done in the state, or out of it, or who shall go out of the state to fight a duel, or to assist in the same as second, or to send, accept, or carry a challenge, shall be disqualified from holding any office under this Constitution, and shall be disenfranchised.

The repeal of Section 19 was proposed by Laws of 1977, and upon ratification by the electorate on November 7, 1978, was deleted from the Constitution by proclamation of the Secretary of State on December 22, 1978.

=== Article 4 ===
Sections 33–39 define the state Senate and House of Representatives while Sections 40–53 define qualifications and impeachment procedures.

An extensive portion of the article (Sections 54–77) is devoted to the rules of procedure in the legislature, particularly in regards to appropriations bills.

Sections 78–86 list a series of laws that the Mississippi Legislature is required to pass, while Sections 87–90 list requirements and prohibitions involving local and special laws. Sections 91–100 list additional laws which the Legislature may not pass (Section 98, which prohibited lotteries, was repealed in 1992).

Section 101 defines Jackson, Mississippi as the state capital and states that it may not be moved absent voter approval.

Sections 102–115 contain a series of miscellaneous provisions, including a unique section (106) dealing with the State Librarian. Section 105 was repealed in 1978.

=== Article 5 ===
Sections 116–127 and 140 deal with the office of the Governor of Mississippi.

Sections 128–132 deal with the office of the Lieutenant Governor of Mississippi, while Section 133 deals with the Secretary of State, Section 134 with the State Treasurer and Auditor of Public Accounts, and Sections 135, 136 and 138-139 deal with county and municipal officers (Section 137 was repealed in 1990).

Section 140 had established a system of 'electoral votes', with each state House district having one electoral vote, while a candidate required a majority of both the popular and electoral vote to be elected Governor. This system was removed as a result of Statewide Measure 2 in 2020, being replaced with a popular vote: however, if no candidate receives a majority, a runoff election will be held between the top two candidates.

Section 141, which Statewide Measure 2 repealed, stated that if no candidate had received a majority of both the popular and the electoral vote, then a contingent election would be held in the Mississippi House of Representatives between the top two candidates with the most votes to determine the Governor. This Section came into play only once during its existence, in 1999, when Ronnie Musgrove received 61 electoral votes, one short of a majority, and was also 2,936 votes (0.38%) short of a popular vote majority: the House elected Musgrove on the first ballot.

Section 142 stated that, if the House of Representatives chose the Governor under the provisions of Section 141, then no member of the House was eligible for any state appointment, and Section 143 stated that all state officers shall be elected at the same time and in the same manner as the Governor: both of these Sections were repealed under Statewide Measure 2.

=== Article 6 ===
Section 144 states that the judicial power of the State is vested in the Mississippi Supreme Court and in such other courts as provided for in the Constitution.

Sections 145–150 (and Section 151 until its repeal in 1914) discuss the number, qualifications and terms of the Supreme Court's judges (as they are called). Each judge serves an elected eight-year term (Section 149). In an odd series of provisions, Section 145 states that the number of Supreme Court judges shall be three with two forming a quorum, amended by Section 145A which states that it shall be six ("that is to say, of three judges in addition to the three provided for by Section 145 of this Constitution") with four forming a quorum, then further amended by Section 145B which states that it shall be nine ("that is to say, of three judges in addition to the six provided for by Section 145-A of this Constitution") with five forming a quorum.

Sections 152–164 discuss the establishment, qualifications, and terms of the circuit and chancery court judges. All such judges serve elected four-year terms (Section 153).

Section 166 places a prohibition against reducing the salary of any judge during his/her term in office.

Section 167 states that all civil officers are conservators of the peace.

Section 168 discusses the role of the court clerks.

Section 169 discusses how all processes are to be styled, that prosecutions are to be carried on in the name and by the authority of the "State of Mississippi", and requires that any indictment be concluded with the phrase "against the peace and dignity of the state."

Section 170 states that each county shall be divided into five districts, with a "resident freeholder" of each district to be elected, and the five to constitute the "Board of Supervisors" for the county. Section 176 further enforces the requirement that a Supervisor be a property owner in the district to which s/he is elected. (A 1990 proposed amendment to these sections was rejected.) It is not known whether the provisions are enforceable.

Section 171 allows for creation of justice courts and constables in each county, with a minimum of two justice court judges in each county. All judges and constables serve elected four-year terms.

Section 172 allows the Mississippi Legislature to create and abolish other inferior courts.

Section 172A contains a prohibition against any court requiring the state or any political subdivision (or any official thereof) to levy or increase taxes.

Section 173 discusses the election of the Mississippi Attorney General while Section 174 discusses the elections of the district attorneys for each circuit court. All such officials serve elected four-year terms.

Section 175 allows for the removal of public officials for willful neglect of duty or misdemeanor, while Section 177 allows for the Governor to fill judicial vacancies in office subject to Senate approval.

Section 177A creates a commission on judicial performance, which has the power to recommend removal of any judge below the Supreme Court (however, only the Supreme Court can order such removal), and also has the power to remove a Supreme Court judge upon 2/3 vote.

=== Article 7 ===
Sections 178–183 and 190–200 deal generally with corporations and related tax issues. Section 183 prohibits any county, town, city, or municipal corporation from owning stock or loaning money to corporations.

Sections 184–188, 193 and 195 deal with railroads (Sections 187, 196 and 197 also dealt with railroads and similar companies, but were later repealed).

Section 198A, added in 1960, declares Mississippi to be a right-to-work state (though several other states have similar provisions, this is one of only five such provisions included in a state Constitution).

=== Article 8 ===
Sections 201–212 discuss the State Board of Education, the State and county school board superintendents, and generally the establishment and maintenance of free public schools, including those for disabled students. Sections 205 and 207, as well as the later-added 213B, were later repealed: Section 207, which required schools to be racially segregated, was repealed on December 22, 1978, 24 years after the U.S. Supreme Court had ruled such laws in violation of the U.S. Constitution.

Sections 213 and 213A discuss higher education.

=== Article 9 ===
Sections 214–222 discuss the Mississippi National Guard.

=== Article 10 ===
Sections 224 and 225 allow the State to require convicts to perform labor, either in state industries or by working on public roads or levees (but not to private contractors); Section 225 also granted the state the power to separate "white" and "black" convicts, however this power was later repealed. Section 226 prohibits any convicts in county jails from being hired outside the county.

Section 223 was repealed in 1990.

=== Article 11 ===
Sections 227–239 generally discuss the creation of levee districts within the State. The text discuss the two levee districts which were created prior to the adoption of the current Constitution – the district for the Mississippi River and the district for the Yazoo River.

=== Article 12 ===
Sections 240–253 discuss matters related to voting.

Section 214 required a voter to be a resident of the state and county for at least one year prior to an election, and six months resident within the municipality they desired to register to be an elector. These were later determined to be unconstitutional by a US Federal Circuit Court in Graham v. Waller, as they served no compelling state interest, and a 30-day residency requirement was instituted in the same judicial order on a temporary basis. Subsequent statutes passed by the legislature kept the 30 day residency requirement.

Sections 241A, 243 and 244 were later repealed: all three were designed, in some part, to disenfranchise African American voters (241A required that a person be "of good moral character", 243 instituted a poll tax, and 244 instituted a literacy test, all of which have been ruled unconstitutional).

=== Article 13 ===
This article consists of only Section 254, which states how the State shall be apportioned into State Senatorial and State Representative districts after every Federal census, provided that the State Senate shall consist of not more than 52 Senators and the State House shall consist of not more than 122 Representatives.

Sections 255 and 256 were later repealed.

=== Article 14 ===
Sections 257 through 272A contain miscellaneous other provisions not related to other Articles.

Section 263, which made illegal the marriage of a "white person" to a "negro" or "mulatto", and was formally repealed in December 1987.

Section 263A, enacted in 2004, defines marriage as between a male and a female.

Sections 269, 270 and 272 were repealed.

=== Article 15 ===
Section 273 discusses how amendments to the constitution may be proposed and approved. This section is divided into 13 subsections.

Subsection (1) states that amendments may be made by either the Mississippi Legislature or by initiative.

Subsection (2) states that, for Legislature-proposed amendments, 2/3 of each house must approve the amendment, plus a majority of the voters.

Subsection (3) states that, for initiative-proposed amendments, the number of signatures required must be at least 12% of the total votes cast for Governor of Mississippi in the most recent gubernatorial election, provided that no more than 20% of the signatures can come from any one congressional (i.e., U.S. House of Representatives) district. However, since the 2002 congressional reapportionment, Mississippi has had only four Congressional districts; thus, this requirement has not been able to be met since that time. In 2001, the Mississippi Supreme Court (in a 6-3 decision which invalidated an approved Article 16 allowing for medicinal marijuana use) took a strict interpretation of this section, thus making it impossible to propose an amendment via initiative barring either an amendment to the constitution or Mississippi gaining a fifth Representative in a future apportionment.

Subsection (5) prohibits certain portions of the constitution from being amended by initiative; for example, the entirety of Article 3 (Bill of Rights) is off-limits.

Subsections (7) and (8) discuss the procedures in the event that a Legislature-proposed amendment is similar to that of an initiative-proposed amendment.

Sections 274 through 285 contain transitional provisions.

Previously the Article contained Sections 286 and 287 which were classified as "ADDITIONAL SECTIONS OF THE CONSTITUTION OF MISSISSIPPI NOT BEING AMENDMENTS OF PREVIOUS SECTIONS"; these were later renumbered as 145A and 149A and placed under the article related to the judiciary.

== Criticisms ==
The Mississippi Constitution has faced various criticisms since its inception in 1890.

=== Disenfranchisement ===
The 1890 convention considered the portions of its new constitution that instituted literacy tests and poll taxes as being the most important. Indeed, the implementation of these measures was the reason for the convention's very existence.

The portion of the 1890 constitution that would specifically allow the state to prevent black voters from casting ballots was Article 12's Section 244, which required that after January 1, 1892, any potential voter prove that they were literate. One method to determine their literacy was for the voter to describe, to a registrar, a "reasonable interpretation" of the state constitution. This was one form of the state's literacy tests, in which the constitution mandated that voters be "literate". Sample questions to determine "literacy" were made intentionally and overtly confusing and vague when applied to African Americans, such as questions inquiring as to the exact number of bubbles in a bar of soap.

The exact wording of Article 12's Section 244, from its enactment in November 1890 to its repeal in December 1975, was as follows:

On and after the first day of January, A. D., 1892, every elector shall, in addition to the foregoing qualifications, be able to read any section of the constitution of this State; or he shall be able to understand the same when read to him, or give a reasonable interpretation thereof. A new registration shall be made before the next ensuing election after January the first, A.D., 1892.

— Section 244, Article 12, Mississippi Constitution of 1890 (November 1, 1890)

Although the wording of the 1890 constitution itself regarding voting was not explicitly discriminatory, the desired intent of the 1890 constitution's framers was that a state registrar, who would be white and politically appointed by Democrats, would deny any potential African American voter from being enrolled by rejecting their answers to a literacy test as erroneous, regardless of whether or not it actually was. The 1890 constitution also imposed a two dollar poll tax for male voters, to take effect after January 1, 1892.

After legal challenges to these laws survived U.S. judicial review, such as in 1898's Williams v. Mississippi, thanks to their race-neutral language, other Southern U.S. states, such as South Carolina in 1895, and Oklahoma by 1907, emulated this method to disenfranchise their black voter base, known as "The Mississippi Plan", in which a law's seemingly un-discriminatory and vague wording would be applied in an arbitrary, subjective and discriminatory manner by the authorities charged with enforcing them.

Despite the 1890 constitution's seemingly un-discriminatory wording on the surface on the subject of voting, Mississippi governor James K. Vardaman, a staunch Democrat, boasted about its enabling of the state government to implement the disenfranchising of black voters. He unabashedly stated that the 1890 constitution's framers had created the constitution precisely to disenfranchise black voters, having desired to prevent black voters from casting ballots, not for any shortcomings they may or may not have had as voters, but for simply being black:

There is no use to equivocate or lie about the matter. ... Mississippi's constitutional convention of 1890 was held for no other purpose than to eliminate the nigger from politics. Not the 'ignorant and vicious', as some of the apologists would have you believe, but the nigger. ... Let the world know it just as it is. (emphasis added)

The Clarion-Ledger newspaper in Jackson reiterated the views of Governor Vardaman and the 1890 convention:

They do not object to negroes voting on account of ignorance, but on account of color. (emphasis added)

In a veiled threat, Governor Vardaman stated that were the 1890 constitution to fail in its explicit intent to disenfranchise the state's African American voters, the state would utilize other methods to disenfranchise them:

In Mississippi we have in our constitution legislated against the racial peculiarities of the Negro. ... When that device fails, we will resort to something else. (emphasis added)

Governor Vardaman, like most Southern Democrats at the time, was an outspoken proponent of using lynchings and terrorism as methods to marginalize and deter African-American voters:

If it is necessary every Negro in the state will be lynched; it will be done to maintain white supremacy. (emphasis added)

The Clarion-Ledger newspaper, known for its vocal partisan support of the state's Democrats, also delivered a justification and rationale for the 1890 constitution's disenfranchising of black voters, expressing the white supremacist view that the framers of the 1890 constitution held, that even the most ignorant and uneducated white voter was preferable to the most well-educated and intelligent black voter:

If every negro in Mississippi was a class graduate of Harvard, and had been elected class orator ... he would not be as well fitted to exercise the rights of suffrage as the Anglo-Saxon farm laborer. (emphasis added)

The effects of the new constitution were profound. In 1890, there were 70,000 more African-American voters in Mississippi than there were white ones. By 1892, that number had dropped to 8,615 black voters out of 76,742 eligible voters.

After World War I, Sidney D. Redmond, a black lawyer from Jackson and the chairman of the Mississippi Republican Party, attempted to investigate the disenfranchising of black voters in Mississippi. He wrote letters of inquiry to several Mississippi counties, which went unanswered. He then inquired via telephone, and many of the counties responded to his inquiries by telling him that they did not "allow niggers to register" to vote.

Several decades later, following an investigation by the United States government into the discriminatory voting practices of Southern U.S. states, the U.S. Supreme Court would declare that methods employed by state governments to disenfranchise African-American voters and prevent them from casting ballots were direct violations of the precepts of the United States Constitution. As a result, Section 244 was rendered effectively null and void under the rulings of U.S. court decisions such as Harper v. Virginia, and the section was formally repealed by the state on December 8, 1975, 85 years after it was created.

=== Gun control ===
In addition to disenfranchising black voters, the 1890 constitutional convention placed into the state constitution, for the first time, the explicit ability of the state government to explicitly restrict the right of people to bear arms across the state. It did this in Article 3's Section 12, by shifting the right of bearing arms from the broad definition of "all persons" to the more restrictive term of "citizen" only, who were intended to be limited to white men only by the 1890 constitution's framers. By granting to the state government the power to enact laws restricting the carrying of concealed weapons by the state's residents, it gave the state a newly enumerated power it did not have under the state's three previous constitutions.

During the late 19th century and well into the early 20th century, there was a growing trend among the governments of Southern U.S. states, controlled by Democrats, in implementing stricter and more stringent regulations restrictions on the right of firearms ownership. This was done in order to prevent African Americans from being able to bear arms for the purpose of defending themselves against the ever-growing threat of lynching, terrorism and extrajudicial paramilitary violence at the hands of Democrats and white supremacists, designed to prevent black voters from electing Republicans. Mississippi was no stranger to such restrictive laws; an 1817 law even forbade an African-American person from being in possession of a canine. As with the sections of the 1890 constitution that disenfranchised black voters, the laws regarding weapons ownership used ostensibly non-discriminatory wording, but were enforced by the state government in an arbitrarily and subjective discriminatory manner, as in many Southern U.S. states at the time.

Regarding the right to bear arms, the 1890 constitution marked a departure from the spirit of the 1868 constitution, and, indeed, from the 1817 and 1832 ones as well, all of which granted the people, rather than citizens, of the state the right to bear arms for self-defense and did not explicitly grant the state government the power to regulate said ownership. The 1890 law's wording further restricted the right to bear arms to the "citizen" for "his" defense, rather than the 1868 constitution's general-neutral "all persons".

The differences between the 1868 and 1890 constitutions regarding the right of the state's people to bear arms are as follows:

All persons shall have a right to keep and bear arms for their defence.

— Section 15, Article 1, Mississippi Constitution of 1868 (emphasis added).

The right of every citizen to keep and bear arms in defense of his home, person, or property, or in aid of the civil power when thereto legally summoned, shall not be called in question, but the legislature may regulate or forbid carrying concealed weapons.

— Section 12, Article 3, Mississippi Constitution of 1890 (emphasis added)

Unlike other sections of the 1890 constitution that would later be repealed or modified by the state, such as the sections regarding marriages, education and prisons, Article 3's Section 12 has remained unchanged, with the wording being exactly the same as it was in 1890, as Article 15's Section 273 prohibit the modification or repeal any of the sections contained in Article 3. To do so, an entirely new constitution would have to be created and adopted by the state.

=== Marriage restrictions ===
Prior to the American Civil War, laws in Southern slave states, and even in some in Northern free states, prohibited marriages between African Americans and those who were not, to assist in the solidification of the institution of slavery by discouraging contact between the two groups. However, after the Union defeated the Confederacy in 1865 and abolished slavery in the United States, these laws were removed in the former Confederate slave states when they adopted new constitutions, which Mississippi did in 1868. However, Democrats, who objected fervently to any marriages between African Americans and whites, reinstated these laws when they violently took control of the states from Republicans in the 1880s and 1890s, instituting Jim Crow laws and segregation shortly thereafter. These laws then lasted for decades, being declared unconstitutional by the U.S. Supreme Court in 1967, though they remained codified in law until they were formally removed in the late 20th century.

Unlike the outgoing 1868 constitution, which contained no such restriction or prohibition, the 1890 constitution criminalized, across the state, the marriage of a "white person" to a "negro", "mulatto", or any person who had "one-eighth or more of negro blood" and mandated that the state refuse to recognize such marriages:

The marriage of a white person with a negro or mulatto, or person who shall have one-eighth or more of negro blood, shall be unlawful and void.

— Section 263, Mississippi Constitution of 1890 (November 1, 1890)

In 1967, after nearly 77 years of the law being in effect, the U.S. Supreme Court unanimously ruled in Loving v. Virginia that laws such as the Mississippi Constitution's Section 263 violated the United States Constitution's Fourteenth Amendment. Thus, the law became legally unenforceable after 1967. However, it took until December 4, 1987, 20 years after the U.S. Supreme Court ruled it unconstitutional, for the section to be formally repealed from the state's constitution. Other U.S. states with similar laws, such as South Carolina and Alabama, took until 1998 and 2000 to formally repeal them from their state constitutions, which was done in popular referendums that passed with slim majorities.

=== Segregated prisons ===
Unlike the 1868 constitution, which did not grant the state the power to do so, the 1890 constitution explicitly granted to the state government, in Section 225, the power to separate "white" and "black" convicts "as far as practicable":

It may provide for the commutation of the sentence of convicts for good behavior, and for the constant separation of the sexes, and for the separation of the white and black convicts as far as practicable, and for religious worship for the convicts.

— Section 225, Mississippi Constitution of 1890 (emphasis added)

The wording granting the state the power to implement the "separation of the white and black convicts as far as practicable" would later be repealed, although the section prescribing the "constant separation of the sexes" is still in effect.

=== Segregated schools ===
Unlike the 1868 constitution, which contained no such requirement, the 1890 constitution introduced for the first time and mandated, in Section 207, that "children of the white and colored races" attend separate schools. Unlike Section 225, which merely granted the state the ability to segregate "white and black convicts", Section 207, created on October 7, 1890, specifically mandated that schools be segregated between "the white and colored races":

Separate schools shall be maintained for children of the white and colored races.

— Section 207, Article 8, Mississippi Constitution of 1890 (November 1, 1890)

The result of the establishment of separate schools for students of "the white and colored races", which did not exist under the 1868 constitution, was that students of the latter race were forced to attend schools that were, in almost every instance, deliberately of substandard quality when compared to the schools attended by white students:

The only effect of Negro education is to spoil a good field hand and make an insolent cook.

— James K. Vardaman (emphasis added), Governor of Mississippi (D-MS)

This patriarchal white supremacist view held by the Democrats, who sought to limit educational and economic opportunities for African Americans, differed greatly from the views of that of the Republicans in the 1870s and 1880s, who believed that African Americans should be allowed to vote, own land and property, attend high-quality schools and own firearms, believing that doing so was morally right and would improve the strength and well-being of the country:

We have got to choose between two results. With these four millions of Negroes, either you must have four millions of disfranchised, disarmed, untaught, landless, thriftless, non-producing, non-consuming, degraded men, or else you must have four millions of land-holding, industrious, arms-bearing, and voting population. Choose between the two! Which will you have?

— Richard Henry Dana Jr. (emphasis added)

In 1954, the U.S. Supreme Court unanimously ruled in Brown v. Board of Education that laws such as Section 207 violated the United States Constitution, and, as such, the law became legally unenforceable. However, it took until December 22, 1978, for the section to be modified to not violate the U.S. Constitution, 24 years after the ruling of the U.S. Supreme Court that deemed it unconstitutional. During this period, Mississippi's politicians considered altering the constitution to abolish public schools entirely, and, amongst some politicians, to give white and negro children funds to attend separate private schools. However, the fact that Mississippi lacked the tradition of private schools present in the Northeast and Midwest made them feel this was impractical.
