= Curtis B. Inabinett =

American politician (born 1931)

Curtis B. Inabinett Sr.

Member of the South Carolina House of Representatives from the 116th district
- In office 1991–1999
- Preceded by: McKinley Washington Jr.
- Succeeded by: Robert Brown (South Carolina politician)

Personal details
- Born: Islandton, South Carolina, U.S.
- Died: June 26, 2023
- Party: Democratic
- Education: South Carolina State University

Curtis Benjamin Inabinett Sr. (July 11, 1931 - June 26, 2023) was an American politician. He was a former member of the South Carolina House of Representatives from the 116th District, serving from 1991 to 1999. He was a member of the Democratic party.

== Early life, education, military service and career ==
Inabinett grew up in Colleton County, South Carolina. With the death of his father, he helped run the family farm. Inabinett attended Deep Creek Elementary School and Colleton High School. He graduated from South Carolina State University in Orangeburg, South Carolina and served two years in the US Army during the Korean War, and in the reserves for six years.

== Political career ==
=== Mayor ===
Inabinett served as mayor of Ravenel, South Carolina from 1982 to 1990. He was the town's first Black mayor and the first African American appointed to the Charleston County Election Commission.

=== South Carolina House of Representatives ===
In 1991, Inabinett was elected to the House of Representatives, serving until 1991.

In 1998, Inabinett introduced the bill ending South Carolina's constitutional ban on interracial marriage. He joined other lawmakers on the compromise that removed the Confederate battle flag from the State House dome.

== Personal life ==
Inabinett was married to Ethel Joy. They had one son, Curtis Inabinett, Jr.

== Death and funeral ==
Inabinett died on June 26, 2023 at age 91. On July 6th, Governor Henry McMaster issued an Executive Order to lower flags from sunrise to sunset on July 8 in his honor. His funeral was held at Charleston First Assembly in West Ashley. Speakers included South Carolina State Representative Wendell Gilliard and Ravenel Mayor Stephen Tumbleston.

== Honors and legacy ==
In 2022, the South Carolina General Assembly passed legislation to name a portion of U.S. Route 17 in South Carolina in Charleston County after Inabinett.

Inabinett received the Order of the Palmetto and in 2014 by a resolution from Congressman Jim Clyburn was also the namesake for a post office in Ravenel. Clyburn and State Representative McKinley Washington Jr. were present for the U.S. Postal Service ceremony.

In 2024, Inabinett was remembered in a ceremony preserving Wallace Creek Park.

Inabinett received an honorary degree from the College of Charleston.
