= Larry Koon (politician) =

American politician (1944–2021)

Member of the South Carolina House of Representatives from the 87th district
- In office 1975–2005
- Preceded by: District created
- Succeeded by: Nikki Haley

Personal details
- Born: February 18, 1944 Leesville, South Carolina
- Died: October 15, 2021 (aged 77) Lexington, South Carolina
- Party: Republican
- Spouse: Katheryn Mack
- Children: Four
- Education: University of South Carolina
- Occupation: Insurance Management

Larry Labruce Koon (February 18, 1944 – October 15, 2021) was an American politician in the state of South Carolina. He served in the South Carolina House of Representatives as a member of the Republican Party from 1975 to 2005, representing Lexington County, South Carolina. At the time of his departure, he was the longest-serving member of the House.

In 2004, he was challenged in the Republican primary by future governor and United States Ambassador to the United Nations Nikki Haley. Initially, Haley ran because she believed that Koon was not going to seek re-election, but Koon entered the race just before the filing deadline. In the primary election, Koon received 42 percent of the vote, Haley received 40 percent, and David Perry received 17 percent. As no candidate received a majority of the vote, Haley and Koon advanced to a runoff election on June 22. In the runoff, Haley defeated Koon 55 percent to 45 percent. After his loss, Koon accused Haley of running a smear campaign, which she denied. She ran unopposed in the general election.
