= 2000 Alabama Amendment 2 =

Referendum allowing interracial marriage

Amendment 2
- November 7, 2000
- Alabama Interracial Marriage Amendment

Results
Choice	Votes	%
Yes	801,725	59.49%
No	545,933	40.51%
Total votes	1,347,658	100.00%

Yes
80%–90%
70%–80%
60%–70%
50%–60%
No
60%–70%
50%–60%

2000 Alabama Amendment 2, also known as the Alabama Interracial Marriage Amendment, was a proposed amendment to the Constitution of Alabama to remove Alabama's ban on interracial marriage. Interracial marriage had already been legalized nationwide 33 years prior in 1967, following Loving v. Virginia, making the vote symbolic. The amendment was approved with 59.5% voting yes, a 19 percentage point margin, though 25 of Alabama's 67 counties voted against it. Alabama was the last state to officially repeal its anti-miscegenation laws, following South Carolina in 1998.

== Background ==
The Constitution of Alabama, passed in 1901, officially prohibited interracial marriage in the state. Article IV, Section 102 states, "The legislature shall never pass any law to authorize or legalize any marriage between any white person and a negro, or descendant of a negro". However, interracial marriage had been legal in Alabama since 1967, when the United States Supreme Court struck down Virginia's anti-miscegenation laws in the landmark decision Loving v. Virginia. Therefore, the amendment was symbolic rather than changing actual policy in the state.

Amendment 2 was a legislatively referred constitutional amendment proposed by Act Number 1999–321. A previous 1998 bill on the same topic died in committee. The amendment's wording was tailored to avoid accidentally legalizing same-sex marriage.

== Support and opposition ==
The Anniston Star endorsed the amendment, describing it as a "no-brainer" and the current state of the constitution a "terrible embarrassment".

Incumbent Attorney General of Alabama Bill Pryor endorsed the amendment, writing that the amendment would repeal a "racist and immoral" part of the constitution, and that rejecting the amendment would lead to a negative view of Alabama that would hurt the state's economy.

The Sons of Confederate Veterans and United Daughters of the Confederacy did not endorse the amendment, but did not oppose it either.

Prominent opposition to the amendment came from the Southern Party, a minor political party which also sought to establish the Southern United States as an independent nation, and from the Confederate Heritage Political Action Committee. Activist Michael Chappell, a prominent member of the Confederate Heritage Political Action Committee, said he opposed the amendment because he did not believe in interracial marriage, and wanted to use the issue to activate other pro-Confederacy supporters for future campaigns. Chappell later tried to have the amendment overturned in court.

== Contents ==
The amendment appeared on the ballot as follows:

Proposed Statewide Amendment Number 2

Proposing an amendment to the Constitution of Alabama of 1901, to abolish the prohibition of interracial marriages. (Proposed by Act No. 1999-321)

The amendment modified the text of Article IV, Section 102 of Alabama's constitution, which previously read "Miscegenation laws. The legislature shall never pass any law to authorize or legalize any marriage between any white person and a negro, or descendant of a negro", by appending the sentence "This section has been annulled by Amendment 667."

== Results ==
Proposal 2
Choice	Votes	%
For	801,725	59.49
Against	545,933	40.51
Total	1,347,658	100.00

The amendment was approved with about 60% of the vote. Twenty-five counties with high white populations voted against the amendment, while counties with high black populations voted for it. The Alabama electorate in 2000 was 73% white and 25% black, meaning that the proposal received a significant amount of support from white voters, with around the same number voting for and against the amendment. This was noted as a "remarkable change in white attitudes" in the book Alabama in the Twentieth Century.

== Analysis and aftermath ==
Of the 17 states with anti-miscegenation laws when Loving v. Virginia was decided, Alabama was the last state to officially repeal its anti-miscegenation laws, following South Carolina's repeal in 1998. The amendment's passage received significant national media attention, including in The Boston Globe, the Chicago Tribune, USA Today, The Wall Street Journal, The Washington Post, and the Los Angeles Times. It also provided encouragement for other states to remove racist language from their own constitutions, including laws preventing Asians from owning property in New Mexico and Kansas. In 2002 it inspired Oregon to repeal its unenforceable black exclusion laws, which dated back to 1857.

In the Montgomery Advertiser, staff columnist Quinn Chattmon wrote that while it was good that the state passed the amendment, it was unfortunate that it was opposed by forty percent of the population. Chattmon wrote that it was "difficult to fathom" why people voted against Amendment 2, and that while the amendment won support from many white voters, race relations still needed significant work.

The amendment was challenged in the lawsuit Chappell v. State. Michael Chappell filed a complaint on September 29, 2000, claiming that the amendment was invalid, because the amendment was described improperly on the ballot. He first sought a preliminary injunction against the measure before the election was held, and later sought to overturn it after the election was held. Chappell's complaint was dismissed in court.

Alabama's miscegenation ban was compared to its same-sex marriage ban, especially after it was also ruled unconstitutional in the 2015 United States Supreme Court case Obergefell v. Hodges. Alabama's gay marriage ban was approved in 2006 with 80% of the vote, passing in every county.

== See also ==
- 2004 Alabama Amendment 2
