= National Register of Historic Places listings in Bourbon County, Kentucky =

Location of Bourbon County in Kentucky

This is a list of the National Register of Historic Places listings in Bourbon County, Kentucky.

This is intended to be a complete list of the properties and districts on the National Register of Historic Places in Bourbon County, Kentucky, United States. The locations of National Register properties and districts for which the latitude and longitude coordinates are included below, may be seen in a map.

There are 61 properties and districts listed on the National Register in the county.

This National Park Service list is complete through NPS recent listings posted June 26, 2026.

== Current listings ==
	Name on the Register	Image	Date listed	Location	City or town	Description
1	Airy Castle	Airy Castle	November 7, 1976 (#76000845)	8 miles northeast of Paris on LaRue Rd. 38°17′44″N 84°16′32″W	Paris	
2	Jacob Aker Farm		February 11, 1993 (#93000050)	795 Bethlehem Rd. 38°09′56″N 84°15′56″W	Paris	
3	Allen-Alexander House	Allen-Alexander House	July 24, 1975 (#75000735)	Off U.S. Route 68 near its junction with U.S. Route 460; 38°13′12″N 84°14′08″W	Paris	
4	Bayless Quarters		June 23, 1983 (#83002556)	Kentucky Route 13; 38°14′39″N 84°05′40″W	North Middletown	
5	Bourbon County Confederate Monument	Bourbon County Confederate Monument	July 17, 1997 (#97000719)	0.5 miles northeast of the junction of U.S. Route 460 and Kentucky Route 1678; 38°12′10″N 84°15′55″W	Paris	
6	Bourbon County Courthouse	Bourbon County Courthouse	December 31, 1974 (#74000851)	Courthouse Sq. 38°12′48″N 84°15′00″W	Paris	
7	Buckner Site (15BB12)		January 27, 1983 (#83002557)	Address Restricted	Paris	
8	Walker Buckner House	Walker Buckner House	March 14, 1997 (#97000232)	1500 Cane Ridge Rd. 38°11′59″N 84°07′57″W	Paris	
9	Cane Ridge Rural Historic District	Cane Ridge Rural Historic District	June 25, 2003 (#02001463)	Cane Ridge Rd. 38°12′21″N 84°08′19″W	Paris	
10	Thomas Champ House	Thomas Champ House	June 19, 2003 (#03000256)	Lexington and Maysville Rd. 38°15′39″N 84°11′29″W	Paris	
11	Dr. Henry Clay House	Dr. Henry Clay House	August 22, 1983 (#83002558)	Off Kentucky Route 227; 38°08′18″N 84°13′53″W	Paris	
12	Colville Covered Bridge	Colville Covered Bridge	December 30, 1974 (#74000850)	4 miles northwest of Millersburg over Hinkston Creek; 38°19′29″N 84°12′12″W	Millersburg	
13	Cooper's Run Baptist Church		June 23, 1983 (#83002559)	Off U.S. Route 27; 38°15′13″N 84°16′25″W	Shawhan	
14	Cooper's Run Rural Historic District	Cooper's Run Rural Historic District	December 23, 1998 (#98001493)	Roughly along and included within Clay Kiser Rd., Paris-Cynthiana Rd., and U.S. Route 460; 38°14′35″N 84°18′18″W	Paris	
15	William David House		February 25, 1979 (#79000965)	North of Shawhan on Shawhan-Ruddles Mill Pike; 38°19′05″N 84°15′56″W	Shawhan	
16	Downtown Paris Historic District	Downtown Paris Historic District	December 15, 1989 (#89002123)	Roughly bounded by 2nd St., Pleasant St., Main St., High St., and 12th St. 38°12′33″N 84°15′10″W	Paris	
17	Duncan Avenue Historic District	Duncan Avenue Historic District	June 23, 1988 (#88000902)	Duncan, Stoner, Vine, and Massie Sts. 38°12′35″N 84°14′49″W	Paris	
18	Duncan Tavern	Duncan Tavern	April 11, 1973 (#73000783)	323 High St. 38°12′47″N 84°15′02″W	Paris	
19	Eades Tavern	Eades Tavern	October 2, 1973 (#73000784)	421 High St. 38°12′44″N 84°15′05″W	Paris	
20	James Eales House		June 23, 1983 (#83002560)	Off Cook Rd. 38°18′56″N 84°16′37″W	Shawhan	
21	Escondida		February 8, 1978 (#78001302)	South of Paris on Kentucky Route 4; 38°07′05″N 84°14′45″W	Paris	
22	James Garrard House		June 23, 1983 (#83002561)	Peacock Pike; 38°15′17″N 84°15′47″W	Shawhan	
23	Glen Oak		January 11, 1996 (#95001513)	1004 Thatchers Mill Rd. 38°06′30″N 84°08′12″W	Paris	
24	The Grange	The Grange	April 11, 1973 (#73000786)	4 miles north of Paris on U.S. Route 68; 38°15′13″N 84°11′50″W	Paris	
25	Ephram Harrod House		August 22, 1983 (#83002562)	Off U.S. Route 460; 38°10′17″N 84°07′23″W	North Middletown	
26	Hillside Farm		March 24, 2000 (#00000277)	1165 N. Middletown Rd. 38°12′04″N 84°11′20″W	Paris	
27	Hopkins House	Hopkins House	June 23, 1983 (#83002563)	Kentucky Route 537; 38°12′18″N 84°04′06″W	North Middletown	
28	Johnston's Inn	Johnston's Inn	March 25, 2008 (#08000209)	1975 Georgetown Rd. 38°13′13″N 84°21′03″W	Paris	
29	Joseph Kennedy House		June 23, 1983 (#83002564)	Off Kentucky Route 1940; 38°16′18″N 84°14′12″W	Shawhan	
30	Thomas Kennedy House		December 8, 1980 (#80001484)	Southeast of Paris on Paris-Winchester Rd. 38°10′06″N 84°13′49″W	Paris	
31	Kiser Station	Kiser Station	December 12, 1977 (#77000601)	North of Paris on Peacock Rd. 38°16′35″N 84°16′43″W	Paris	
32	James Kiser House	James Kiser House	August 6, 2014 (#14000457)	41 E. Main St. 38°12′50″N 84°14′55″W	Paris	
33	Little Rock-Jackstown Road Rural Historic District	Little Rock-Jackstown Road Rural Historic District	March 31, 2004 (#04000246)	Along Little Rock-Jackstown and Soper Rds. 38°13′06″N 84°03′20″W	Little Rock	
34	Loudoun Hall		August 2, 1978 (#78001303)	South of Paris off Kentucky Route 956; 38°05′46″N 84°13′13″W	Paris	
35	Rudolph Mauck House		June 23, 1983 (#83002565)	Off Kentucky Route 1893; 38°18′41″N 84°15′28″W	Shawhan	
36	McKee-Vimont Row Houses	McKee-Vimont Row Houses	September 9, 1975 (#75000734)	Main St. 38°17′57″N 84°09′01″W	Millersburg	Three adjoining houses, two of stone possibly built by future Kentucky governor Thomas Metcalfe.
37	McLeod Spring House		June 23, 1983 (#83002566)	Kentucky Route 1939; 38°08′27″N 84°19′48″W	Paris	
38	Miller's House at Ruddels Mills	Miller's House at Ruddels Mills	June 23, 1983 (#83002567)	Kentucky Route 1940; 38°18′21″N 84°14′18″W	Millersburg	
39	Millersburg Historic District	Millersburg Historic District	April 10, 1986 (#86000697)	Roughly bounded by College Ave., Miller, Second, and Trigg Sts. 38°18′08″N 84°08′48″W	Millersburg	
40	Owen-Gay Farm	Owen-Gay Farm	March 13, 1997 (#97000163)	Gay Rd., junction with Donaldson Rd. at the Clark County line 38°06′24″N 84°06′56″W	Winchester	Extends into Clark County
41	Paris Cemetery Gatehouse	Paris Cemetery Gatehouse	November 24, 1978 (#78001301)	US 68 Bus. 38°12′07″N 84°15′46″W	Paris	
42	Paris Courthouse Square Historic District	Paris Courthouse Square Historic District	January 25, 1979 (#79000963)	Courthouse Sq. and environs 38°12′47″N 84°15′00″W	Paris	
43	Paris Railroad Depot	Paris Railroad Depot	April 11, 1973 (#73000785)	Between 10th St. and Winchester Pike; 38°12′23″N 84°15′03″W	Paris	
44	Pocket Rural Historic District	Pocket Rural Historic District	April 22, 2003 (#03000257)	Along See Rd., Kentucky Route 57, and Kentucky Route 1198; 38°11′32″N 84°01′32″W	Sharpsburg	
45	Thomas Rodgers House		June 23, 1983 (#83002568)	U.S. Route 460; 38°11′39″N 84°10′46″W	Paris	
46	Elias Rymill House	Elias Rymill House	June 23, 1983 (#83002569)	Off Brentsville Rd. 38°16′07″N 84°20′28″W	Shawhan	
47	Sacred Home		August 9, 1979 (#79000964)	West of Paris on Hume-Bedford Rd. 38°11′19″N 84°20′28″W	Paris	
48	Sandusky House		June 23, 1983 (#83002570)	Off U.S. Route 68; 38°17′00″N 84°07′18″W	Carlisle	
49	Laban Shipp House		June 23, 1983 (#83002571)	Off Kentucky Route 1940; 38°16′57″N 84°15′16″W	Shawhan	
50	Snow Hill		November 7, 1997 (#97001341)	4100 Little Rock-Jackstown Rd. 38°12′19″N 84°03′21″W	Little Rock	
51	Jacob Spears Distillery	Jacob Spears Distillery	June 23, 1983 (#83002573)	Kentucky Route 1876; 38°16′05″N 84°18′26″W	Shawhan	
52	Jacob Spears House	Jacob Spears House	June 23, 1983 (#83002572)	Kentucky Route 1876; 38°16′04″N 84°18′30″W	Shawhan	
53	Joseph L. Stephens House	Joseph L. Stephens House	June 23, 1983 (#83002574)	Kentucky Route 1940; 38°18′35″N 84°14′29″W	Millersburg	
54	Stoner Creek Rural Historic District		May 2, 2001 (#01000449)	Along Winchester, Stoney Point, Spears Mill, and N. Middletown Rds. 38°09′53″N 84°11′12″W	Paris	
55	Sugar Grove	Sugar Grove	November 15, 1996 (#96001346)	573 Clay-Kiser Rd. 38°14′32″N 84°20′09″W	Paris	
56	John Tucker House	John Tucker House	March 30, 1995 (#95000302)	405 McNease Rd. 38°16′32″N 84°19′36″W	Paris	
57	West Millersburg Rural Historic District		May 24, 2007 (#06001197)	Millersburg-Ruddels Mills and Steele Ford Roads; 38°18′18″N 84°10′32″W	Millersburg	
58	Widow McDowell House		June 23, 1983 (#83002576)	Kentucky Route 537; 38°13′11″N 84°11′13″W	Paris	
59	Hubbard Williams House		June 23, 1983 (#83002577)	Off Kentucky Routes 32/36; 38°21′45″N 84°11′02″W	Millersburg	
60	Woodlawn		December 2, 1996 (#96001345)	Peacock Rd., approximately 2 miles north of Paris; 38°14′41″N 84°15′23″W	Paris	
61	Capt. James Wright House and Cabin	Capt. James Wright House and Cabin	October 8, 1976 (#76000846)	1 mile southwest of Paris on U.S. Route 27; 38°11′27″N 84°16′49″W	Paris	

== See also ==
- List of National Historic Landmarks in Kentucky
- National Register of Historic Places listings in Kentucky
