= National Register of Historic Places listings in Harrison County, Kentucky =

Location of Harrison County in Kentucky

This is a list of the National Register of Historic Places listings in Harrison County, Kentucky.

This is intended to be a complete list of the properties and districts on the National Register of Historic Places in Harrison County, Kentucky, United States. The locations of National Register properties and districts for which the latitude and longitude coordinates are included may be seen in the map below.

There 25 properties and districts listed on the National Register in the county.

This National Park Service list is complete through NPS recent listings posted March 21, 2025.

== Current listings ==
	Name on the Register	Image	Date listed	Location	City or town	Description
1	Archeological Site No. 15HR4		February 20, 1986 (#86000269)	Address Restricted	Lair vicinity	
2	Church of the Advent, Episcopal	Church of the Advent, Episcopal	December 22, 1978 (#78001339)	122 N. Walnut St. 38°23′30″N 84°17′43″W	Cynthiana	
3	Coleman-Desha Plantation	Coleman-Desha Plantation	February 26, 1993 (#93000045)	U.S. Route 62 E., Oddville Pike, 1 mile northeast of Cynthiana; 38°24′00″N 84°16′20″W	Cynthiana	
4	Confederate Monument in Cynthiana	Confederate Monument in Cynthiana	July 17, 1997 (#97000695)	Battlegrove Cemetery, 0.75 miles east of the junction of S. Elmarch Ave. and Pike St. 38°23′41″N 84°16′51″W	Cynthiana	
5	Cynthiana Commercial District	Cynthiana Commercial District	October 19, 1982 (#82001567)	Pike St. from Church to Main Sts., and Main St. from Bridge to Pleasant Sts. 38°23′29″N 84°24′40″W	Cynthiana	
6	Joel Frazer House		June 23, 1983 (#83002786)	Off Kentucky Route 982; 38°22′14″N 84°17′29″W	Cynthiana	Stone house built in 1810 by Thomas Metcalfe, a stonemason and then-future Kentucky state governor.
7	Handy Farm	Handy Farm	November 25, 2005 (#05001316)	U.S. Route 62; 38°23′40″N 84°17′07″W	Cynthiana	
8	Harrison County Courthouse	Harrison County Courthouse	December 6, 1974 (#74000880)	100 Main St. 38°23′21″N 84°17′52″W	Cynthiana	
9	Haviland House		June 23, 1983 (#83002787)	Off U.S. Route 62; 38°25′28″N 84°15′54″W	Cynthiana	
10	John Hinkson House		June 23, 1983 (#83002788)	Off U.S. Route 27; 38°20′29″N 84°18′40″W	Shawhan	
11	Kimbrough-Hehr House		April 20, 1979 (#79000992)	U.S. Route 62; 38°19′39″N 84°21′48″W	Broadwell	
12	William T. Lafferty House	William T. Lafferty House	April 10, 1980 (#80001538)	548 E. Pike St. 38°23′15″N 84°16′53″W	Cynthiana	
13	John Lair House		June 23, 1983 (#83002789)	Old Lair Rd. 38°20′24″N 84°17′30″W	Shawhan	
14	John McKee House		June 23, 1983 (#83002790)	Cook Rd. 38°20′51″N 84°16′04″W	Shawhan	
15	Samuel McMillan House		June 23, 1983 (#83002791)	Off U.S. Route 62; 38°20′13″N 84°21′39″W	Shawhan	
16	Monticello	Monticello	December 31, 1974 (#74000881)	Monticello Heights; 38°22′59″N 84°17′37″W	Cynthiana	Mansion overlooking Cynthiana which was built around 1883. Now destroyed, carriage house shown.
17	Poplar Hill	Poplar Hill	November 7, 1976 (#76000896)	East of Cynthiana on Kentucky Route 32; 38°22′59″N 84°16′32″W	Cynthiana	
18	Wesley Roberts House	Wesley Roberts House	November 10, 1982 (#82001568)	113-115 N. Main St. 38°23′28″N 84°17′51″W	Cynthiana	
19	Second Battle of Cynthiana Battlefield	Second Battle of Cynthiana Battlefield	September 6, 2002 (#02000914)	1 mile north of Cynthiana, east of Kentucky Route 36; 38°24′28″N 84°18′39″W	Cynthiana	
20	Joseph Shawhan House		June 23, 1983 (#83002792)	Off U.S. Route 27; 38°18′55″N 84°18′43″W	Shawhan	
21	Smith House		June 23, 1983 (#83002793)	Off Lair Rd. 38°21′19″N 84°16′47″W	Shawhan	
22	Spur Gasoline Station	Spur Gasoline Station	April 27, 1987 (#87000647)	201 E. Bridge St. 38°23′15″N 84°17′46″W	Cynthiana	
23	Stone House of Indian Creek		June 23, 1983 (#83002794)	Off U.S. Route 62; 38°25′06″N 84°16′20″W	Cynthiana	
24	Stoney Castle		December 12, 1978 (#78001338)	West of Berry on Lafferty Pike; 38°31′03″N 84°24′09″W	Berry	
25	John Williams House		June 23, 1983 (#83002795)	Off Kentucky Routes 32/36; 38°22′11″N 84°15′15″W	Shawhan	

== See also ==
- List of National Historic Landmarks in Kentucky
- National Register of Historic Places listings in Kentucky
