= John Lair House and Stables =

Historic house in Kentucky, United States

- U.S. National Register of Historic Places
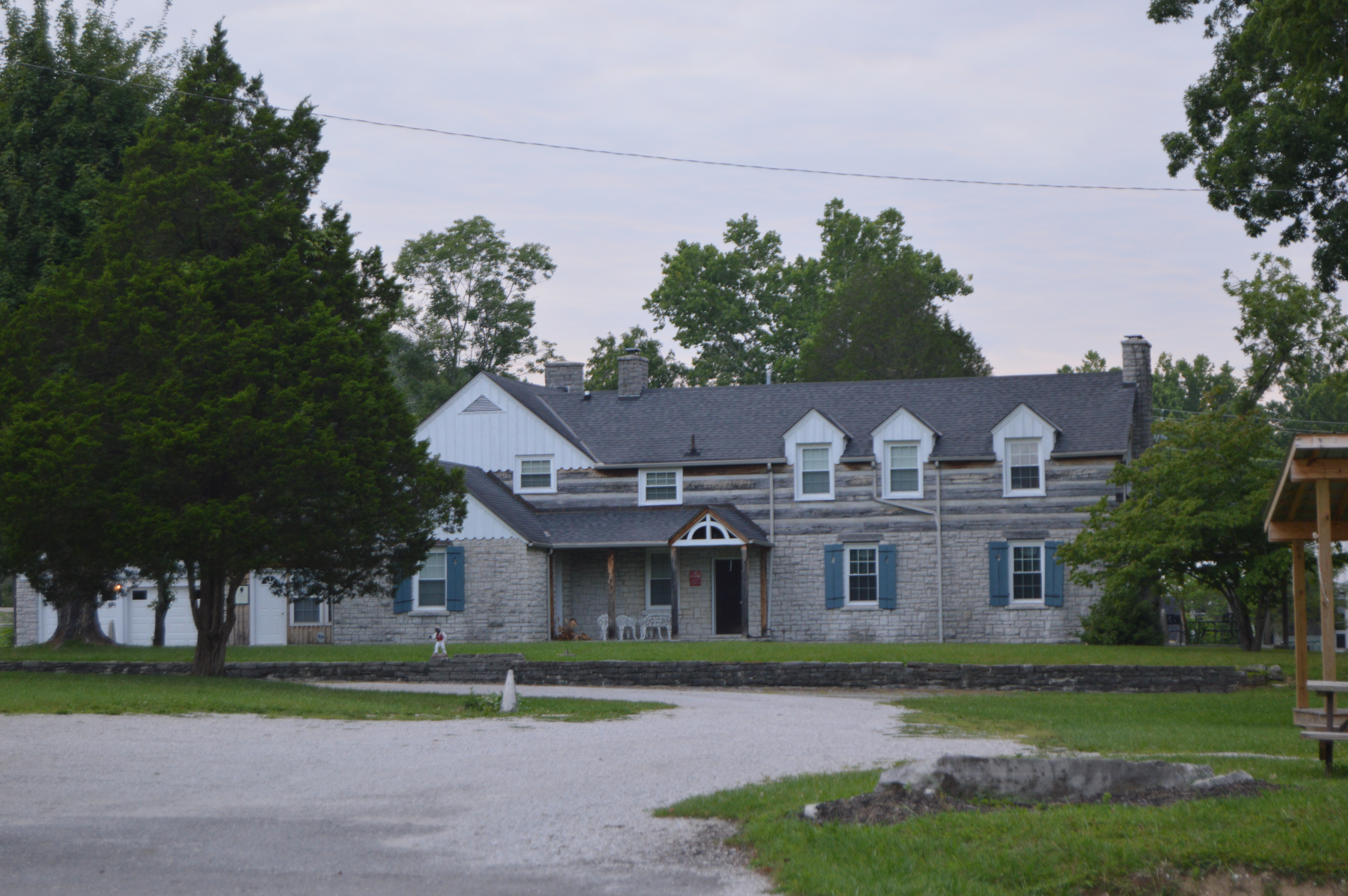

- Location within Kentucky Location within the United States
- Location: Northeast corner of U.S. Route 25 and Hummel Rd., Renfro Valley, Kentucky
- Coordinates: 37°23′20″N 84°19′53″W
- Area: 8 acres (3.2 ha)
- Built: 1944
- Architect: Haffler, Wayne W.
- NRHP reference No.: 95001270
- Added to NRHP: November 7, 1995

The John Lair House and Stables, at the northeast corner of U.S. Route 25 and Hummel Rd. in Renfro Valley, Kentucky, was built in 1944. It was listed on the National Register of Historic Places in 1995. The listing included two contributing buildings.

Its conceptual design was by John Lair; the architect was Wayne W. Haffler.

== See also ==
- John Lair House, near Shawhan, Kentucky, listed on the National Register in 1983
- E.L. Ehlen Livery and Sale Stable: National Register of Historic Places listing in Renfro Valley, Kentucky
- National Register of Historic Places listings in Rockcastle County, Kentucky
