= National Register of Historic Places listings in Rockcastle County, Kentucky =

Location of Rockcastle County in Kentucky

This is a list of the National Register of Historic Places listings in Rockcastle County, Kentucky.

It is intended to be a complete list of the properties on the National Register of Historic Places in Rockcastle County, Kentucky, United States. The locations of National Register properties for which the latitude and longitude coordinates are included below, may be seen in a map.

There are 4 properties listed on the National Register in the county.

This National Park Service list is complete through NPS recent listings posted December 12, 2025.

== Current listings ==
	Name on the Register	Image	Date listed	Location	City or town	Description
1	Great Saltpetre Cave	Great Saltpetre Cave	July 30, 2013 (#13000565)	237 Saltpetre Cave Rd. 37°22′04″N 84°12′14″W	Mount Vernon	
2	Bennett Hiatt Log House	Bennett Hiatt Log House	November 15, 1984 (#84000394)	U.S. Route 25; 37°23′08″N 84°20′02″W	Renfro Valley	
3	John Lair House and Stables	John Lair House and Stables	November 7, 1995 (#95001270)	Northeastern corner of the junction of U.S. Route 25 and Hummel Rd. 37°23′20″N 84°19′53″W	Renfro Valley	
4	Mount Vernon Commercial District	Mount Vernon Commercial District	November 10, 1983 (#83003815)	Main St. from Church to Richmond Sts. 37°21′11″N 84°20′20″W	Mount Vernon	

== See also ==
- List of National Historic Landmarks in Kentucky
- National Register of Historic Places listings in Kentucky
