= Ephram Harrod House =

House in North Middletown, Kentucky, US

- U.S. National Register of Historic Places
- Location within Kentucky
- Nearest city: North Middletown, Kentucky, U.S.
- Coordinates: 38°10′17″N 84°07′23″W
- Area: 5.2 acres (2.1 ha)
- Built by: Thomas Metcalf
- Architectural style: Federal
- MPS: Early Stone Buildings of Central Kentucky
- NRHP reference No.: 83002562
- Added to NRHP: August 22, 1983

The Ephram Harrod House is a historic residential stone house built in the late 18th-century in Bourbon County, Kentucky, near North Middletown, Kentucky, U.S. It was listed on the National Register of Historic Places in 1983, and was included in the multiple property submission, "Early Stone Buildings of Kentucky".

== History ==
The building is located off U.S. 460 in Bourbon County near North Middletown, Kentucky. It includes aspects of Federal style. It was constructed by stonemason, master builder, and self-taught architect, Thomas Metcalf, who went on to become governor of Kentucky.

In its 1982, Kentucky Historic Resources Inventory assessment, the house was deemed "Unsurpassed in KY for the historic and architectural value because of the workmanship and original condition."

== See also ==
- List of buildings constructed by Thomas Metcalfe
- Stone House on Kentucky River
- Stone House on Tanner's Creek
