= Ehlen =

Ehlen may refer to:

- E.L. Ehlen Livery and Sale Stable, an historic livery stables in Kentucky

== People with the surname ==
- Frederick Ehlen (1851–1934), American baseball player
- Leo Ehlen (1953–2016), Dutch football player
- Margriet Ehlen (born 1943), Dutch poet, composer, conductor, and educator
- Michelle Ehlen (born 1978), American film director, producer, screenwriter, and actress
- Nikolaus Ehlen (1886–1965), German pacifist teacher

== See also ==
- Ellen (disambiguation)
