= Shawhan =

Shawhan may refer to:

- Shawhan, Kentucky, an unincorporated community in Bourbon County, Kentucky, United States
- Joe Shawhan (born 1963), American ice hockey player and coach
