= Matthew Kennedy (architect) =

American architect

Matthew Kennedy, an early, self-proclaimed, architect in Kentucky, designed large brick Federal-style houses during the early 1800s. Several of his works are listed on the National Register of Historic Places (NRHP).

He designed Buknore House, NRHP-listed as ‘’Walker Buckner House’’, and Buknore's mate, Auvergne, on the Winchester Road (BB-308, NRHP-listed (perhaps in Stoner Creek Rural Historic District?).

William M. Johnson, author of NRHP nomination for Snow Hill (Little Rock, Kentucky) (1840), believed that Kennedy was its architect, based on similarities to Buknore and Auvergne. If Snow Hill was a work by Kennedy, it was one of his last ones.

He designed the Matthew Kennedy House (1813), on Second St. in Lexington, Kentucky.

He designed the principal building of Transylvania University.
