= John Lair House =

- U.S. National Register of Historic Places
- Location within Kentucky Location within the United States
- Location: Old Lair Rd., near Shawhan, Kentucky
- Coordinates: 38°20′25″N 84°17′29″W
- Area: 0.7 acres (0.28 ha)
- Architectural style: Greek Revival, Federal
- MPS: Early Stone Buildings of Central Kentucky TR
- NRHP reference No.: 83002789
- Added to NRHP: June 23, 1983

The John Lair House near Shawhan, Kentucky was listed on the National Register of Historic Places in 1983. The listing included three contributing buildings.

It is a three-bay two-story hall-parlor plan dry stone house.

== See also ==
- John Lair House and Stables, Renfro Valley, Kentucky, also NRHP-listed
