= Rockcastle County School District =

School district in Rockcastle County, Kentucky

Rockcastle County Schools

Location
- Rockcastle County, Kentucky United States
- Coordinates: 37.3563804°N 84.3402082°W

District information
- Type: Public
- Motto: Rocket Learners to Rocket Leaders
- Grades: Pre-K–12
- Superintendent: Dr. Carrie Ballinger
- NCES District ID: 2105070

Students and staff
- Students: 2,762
- Teachers: 175 (on FTE basis)
- Student–teacher ratio: 15:78

Other information
- Website: www.rockcastle.kyschools.us

The Rockcastle County School District is a public school district based in Mount Vernon, Kentucky in the United States. All of the schools in the Rockcastle County School District are based in Mount Vernon.

== Elementary schools ==
- Mount Vernon Elementary School
- Roundstone Elementary School
- Brodhead Elementary School

== Middle schools ==
- Rockcastle County Middle School

== High schools ==
- Rockcastle County High School
