= Goochland Cave =

Cave in Rockcastle County, Kentucky

Goochland Cave is the longest known cave in Rockcastle County, Kentucky. It has a length of 11.18 miles. Goochland is located in Daniel Boone National Forest and is named on USGS Topo maps. The cave is subject to flash flooding. It has 3 known entrances. Not all of this cave has been mapped.
