= Rockcastle County High School =

High school in Rockcastle County, Kentucky

Location
- 1545 Lake Cumberland Rd, Mount Vernon, Rockcastle County, Kentucky 40456; United States; 37.3613°N 84.3645°W

Information
- Type: Public high school
- Established: c. 1925
- School district: Rockcastle County School District
- NCES District ID: 2105070
- Superintendent: Dr. Carrie Ballinger
- CEEB code: 181910
- NCES School ID: 210507001252
- Principal: J.D. Bussell
- Teaching staff: 49.94 (on an FTE basis)
- Grades: 9–12
- Enrollment: 827 (2023–2024)
- Student to teacher ratio: 16.56
- Language: English and Spanish
- Colors: red, navy blue, white
- National ranking: 4,608th
- Website: https://rchs.rockcastle.kyschools.us/

Rockcastle County High School (abbreviated RCHS) is a public high school located in Mount Vernon, Kentucky, United States. The school mascot is the Rockets, with the school colors being red, navy blue and white. It is the only high school inside of the Rockcastle County School District. The enrollment was 826 students as of 2021–2022.

== Athletic awards ==
- Girls Basketball: 2011, State Champion, 2006, Region Champion
- Football: 2005, Region Champion
- Volleyball: 2005, Region Champion
- Girls Cross Country: 2005, Region Champion
