= Bennett Hiatt Log House =

Historic house in Kentucky, United States

- U.S. National Register of Historic Places
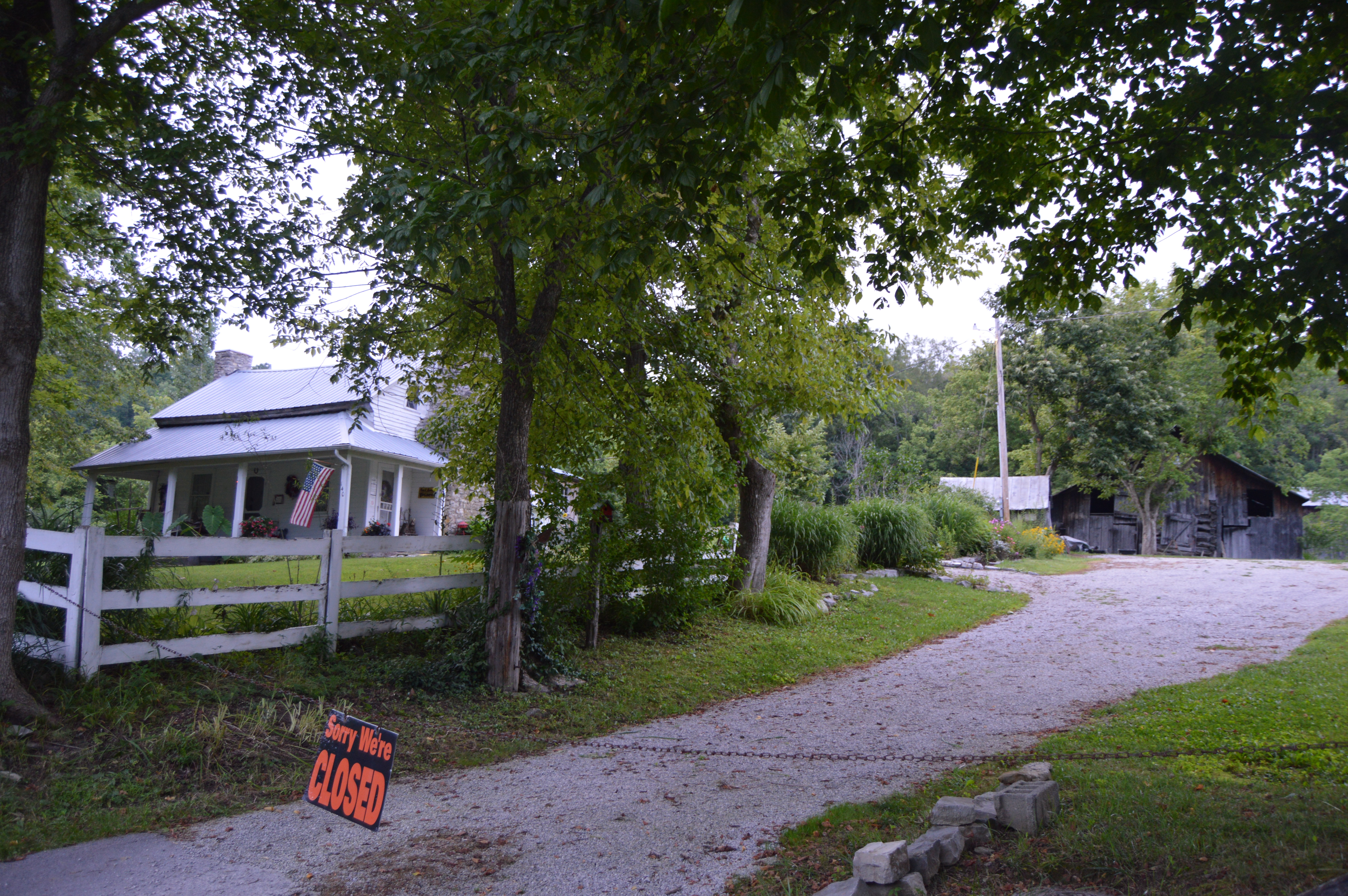

- Location within Kentucky Location within the United States
- Location: U.S. Route 25, near Renfro Valley, Kentucky
- Coordinates: 37°23′08″N 84°20′02″W
- Area: 2 acres (0.81 ha)
- Built: 1828
- Built by: Hiatt, Bennett
- Architectural style: Single-pen log
- NRHP reference No.: 84000394
- Added to NRHP: November 15, 1984

The Bennett Hiatt Log House, near Renfro Valley, Kentucky, is a log house built in 1828. It was listed on the National Register of Historic Places in 1984.

The house was built originally as a one-and-a-half-story single pen; an extension was added after the Civil War. There are six contributing buildings on the property.
