= Cooper's Run Baptist Church =

Historic church in Kentucky, United States

- U.S. National Register of Historic Places
- Location within Kentucky Location within the United States
- Nearest city: Shawhan, Kentucky
- Coordinates: 38°15′13″N 84°16′25″W
- Area: 3 acres (1.2 ha)
- Built: 1803
- Architectural style: Federal
- MPS: Early Stone Buildings of Central Kentucky TR
- NRHP reference No.: 83002559
- Added to NRHP: June 23, 1983

Cooper's Run Baptist Church is a historic Baptist church building in Shawhan, Kentucky. It was added to the National Register of Historic Places in 1983.

The church congregation was organized in 1787. This building, built in 1803, is an early stone church. It is a two-story building with three bays.

== See also ==
- National Register of Historic Places listings in Kentucky
