= Bayless Quarters =

- U.S. National Register of Historic Places
- Location within Kentucky Location within the United States
- Location: Kentucky Route 13, near North Middletown, Kentucky
- Coordinates: 38°14′39″N 84°05′40″W
- Area: 4.5 acres (1.8 ha)
- Architectural style: Greek Revival, Federal
- MPS: Early Stone Buildings of Central Kentucky TR
- NRHP reference No.: 83002556
- Added to NRHP: June 23, 1983

Bayless Quarters, near North Middletown, Kentucky, was listed on the National Register of Historic Places in 1983. The listing included three contributing buildings.

It includes Greek Revival and Federal architecture.

The main structure is a one-story two-bay dry stone quarters. A smokehouse is also included.
