= John Hinkson House =

- U.S. National Register of Historic Places
- Location within Kentucky Location within the United States
- Location: Off U.S. Route 27, near Shawhan, Kentucky
- Coordinates: 38°20′29″N 84°18′40″W
- Area: 2.6 acres (1.1 ha)
- Built: c.1790
- Architectural style: Federal
- MPS: Early Stone Buildings of Central Kentucky TR
- NRHP reference No.: 83002788
- Added to NRHP: June 23, 1983

The John Hinkson House in Harrison County, Kentucky near Shawhan, dates from c.1790. It was listed on the National Register of Historic Places in 1983.

The house is a three-bay two-story dry stone house hall-parlor plan house. It was built by John Hickson, a Revolutionary War soldier and famous early settler, who led the first group of white men up the Licking River to settle in this area.

The listing included four contributing buildings and a contributing structure. It has also been known as the Old Ammerman Place.
