= Walker Buckner House =

- U.S. National Register of Historic Places
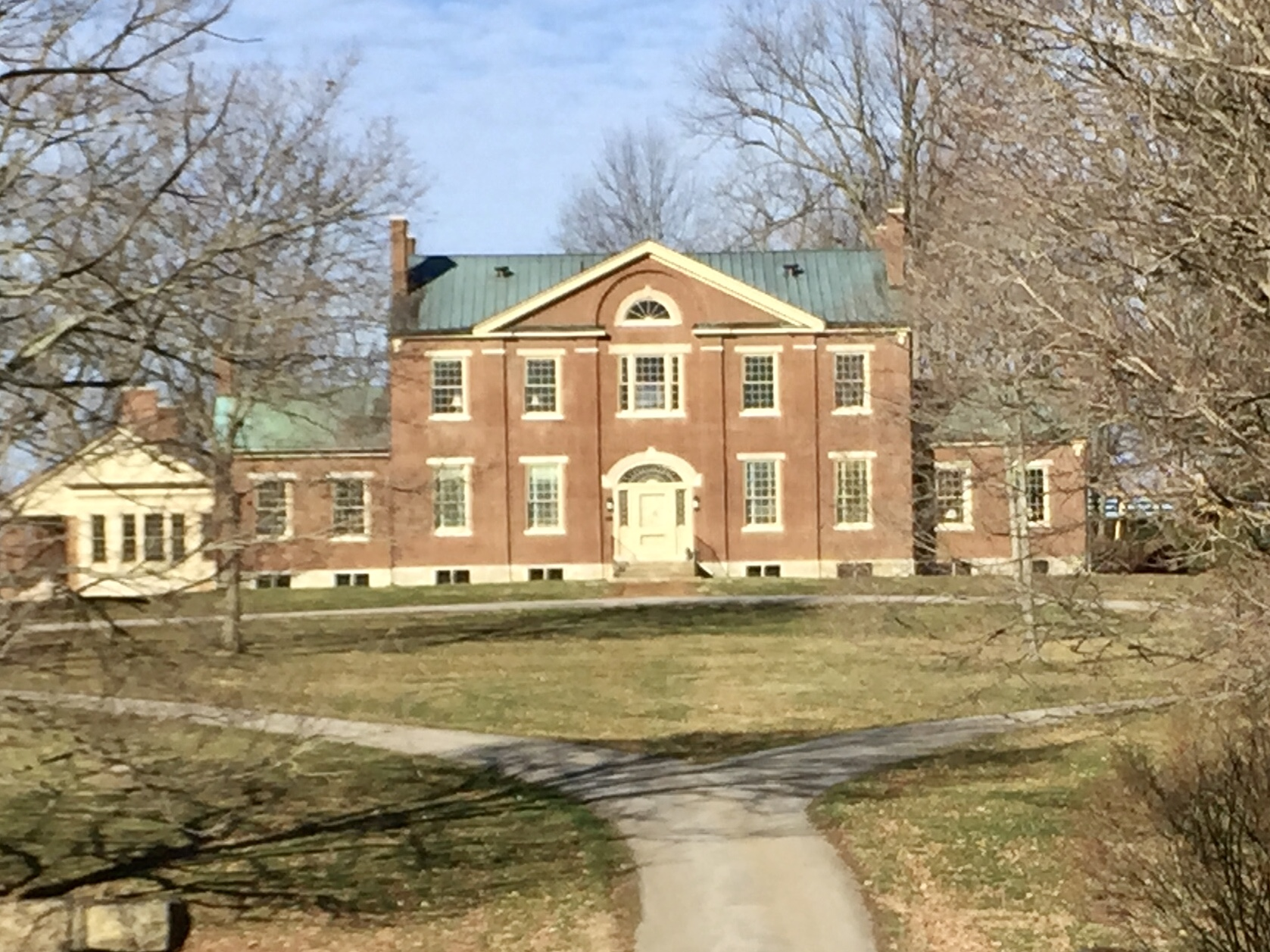

- Location within Kentucky Location within the United States
- Nearest city: Paris, Kentucky
- Coordinates: 38°11′59″N 84°07′57″W
- Area: 9 acres (3.6 ha)
- Built: 1841
- Built by: Butler & DeJarnett
- Architect: Matthew Kennedy
- Architectural style: Federal
- NRHP reference No.: 97000232
- Added to NRHP: March 14, 1997

The Walker Buckner House, in Bourbon County, Kentucky near Paris, Kentucky, was built in 1841. It has also been known as Buknore and as Locust Grove. It was listed on the National Register of Historic Places in 1997.

It was designed by self-proclaimed architect Matthew Kennedy, and like some other of his works was built by Butler & DeJarnett in the Federal style.

The listing included four contributing buildings and a contributing structure.

It is located at 1500 Cane Ridge Rd.
