= Monticello (Cynthiana, Kentucky) =

- U.S. National Register of Historic Places
- Location within Kentucky Location within the United States
- Location: Monticello Heights, Cynthiana, Kentucky
- Coordinates: 38°22′59″N 84°17′37″W
- Area: 9.5 acres (3.8 ha)
- Built: c.1883
- Architect: Samual Hannaford
- NRHP reference No.: 74000881
- Added to NRHP: December 31, 1974

Monticello of Monticello Heights in Cynthiana, Kentucky was built in 1883. It was listed on the National Register of Historic Places in 1974.

It is a mansion which was built around 1883 for Thomas Jefferson Megibben at reported cost of $300,000. It overlooks the town of Cynthiana and was approached by a long curving drive. It was designed by the Cincinnati architectural firm of Samuel Hannaford.

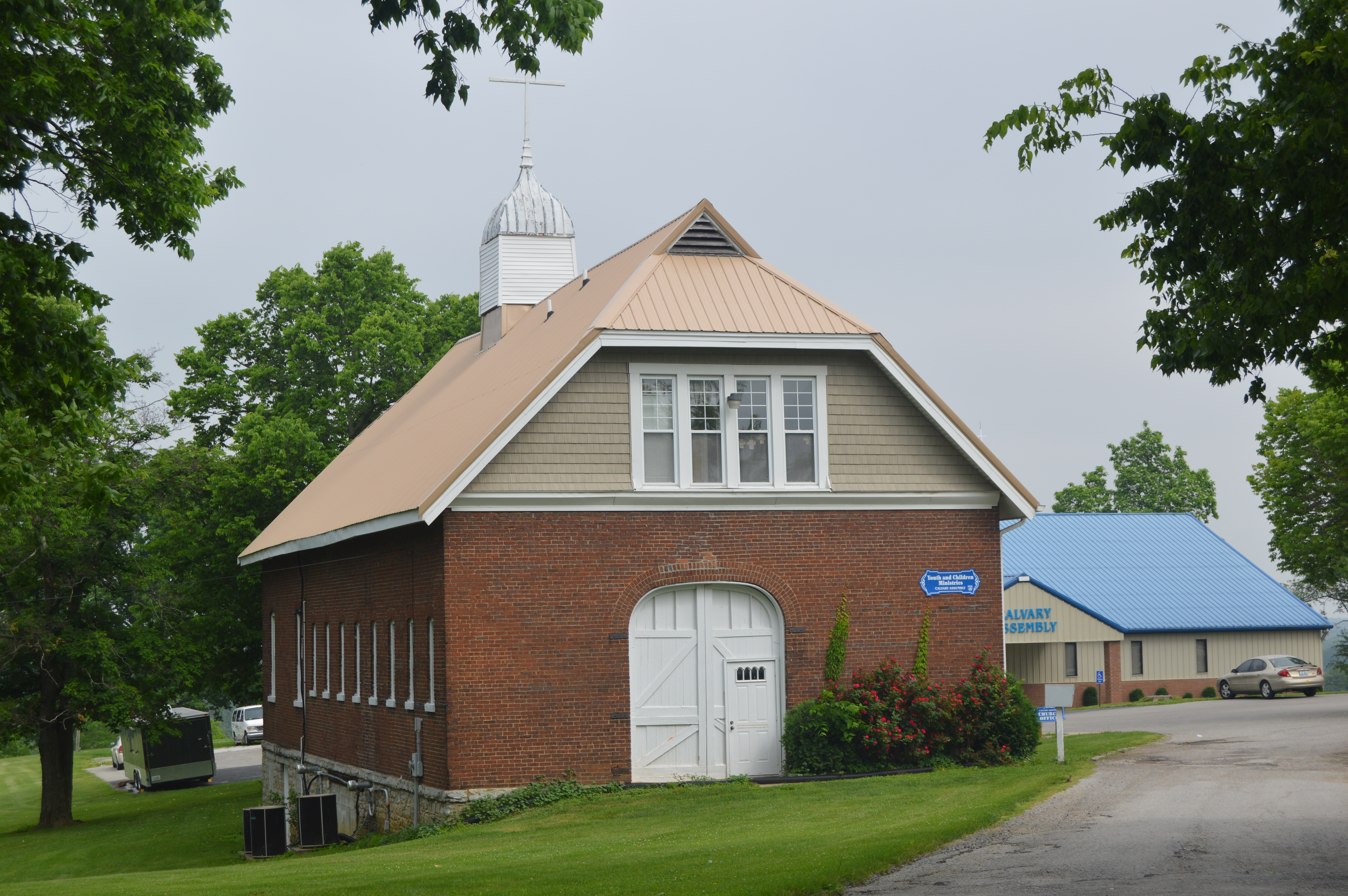
Carriage house

The house no longer exists but its carriage house survives.
