= Snow Hill (Little Rock, Kentucky) =

House

- U.S. National Register of Historic Places
- Location within Kentucky
- Nearest city: Little, Kentucky
- Coordinates: 38°12′19″N 84°03′21″W
- Area: 2 acres (0.81 ha)
- Built: 1840
- Built by: Butler & Dejarnett
- Architectural style: Early Republic, Federal
- NRHP reference No.: 97001341
- Added to NRHP: November 7, 1997

Snow Hill, on Brush Creek in rural Bourbon County, Kentucky near Little Rock, Kentucky, was built in 1840. It was listed on the National Register of Historic Places in 1997.

It is a two-story large brick house, with brick laid in Flemish bond, on a dry cut-stoe foundation. It has "massive dimensions typical of the classic modes of Kentucky's Federal Era of Architecture. The main block of the house is over sixty feet long and twenty-three feet wide with a rear ell-wing measuring fifty-six feet long by twenty feet wide. The two story main house, contains the classic elements likely introduced to the Bluegrass Region by architect Matthew Kennedy. These elements include giant pilasters, which define a central pedimented full height portico. Also included are double front doors with Greek Key decorative crown and supporting decorative pilasters and symmetrical facade. The giant pilasters and portico pediment were removed by John 0'Brennan in the 1940s." It is believed by the National Register nomination author that the house was designed by Kennedy.

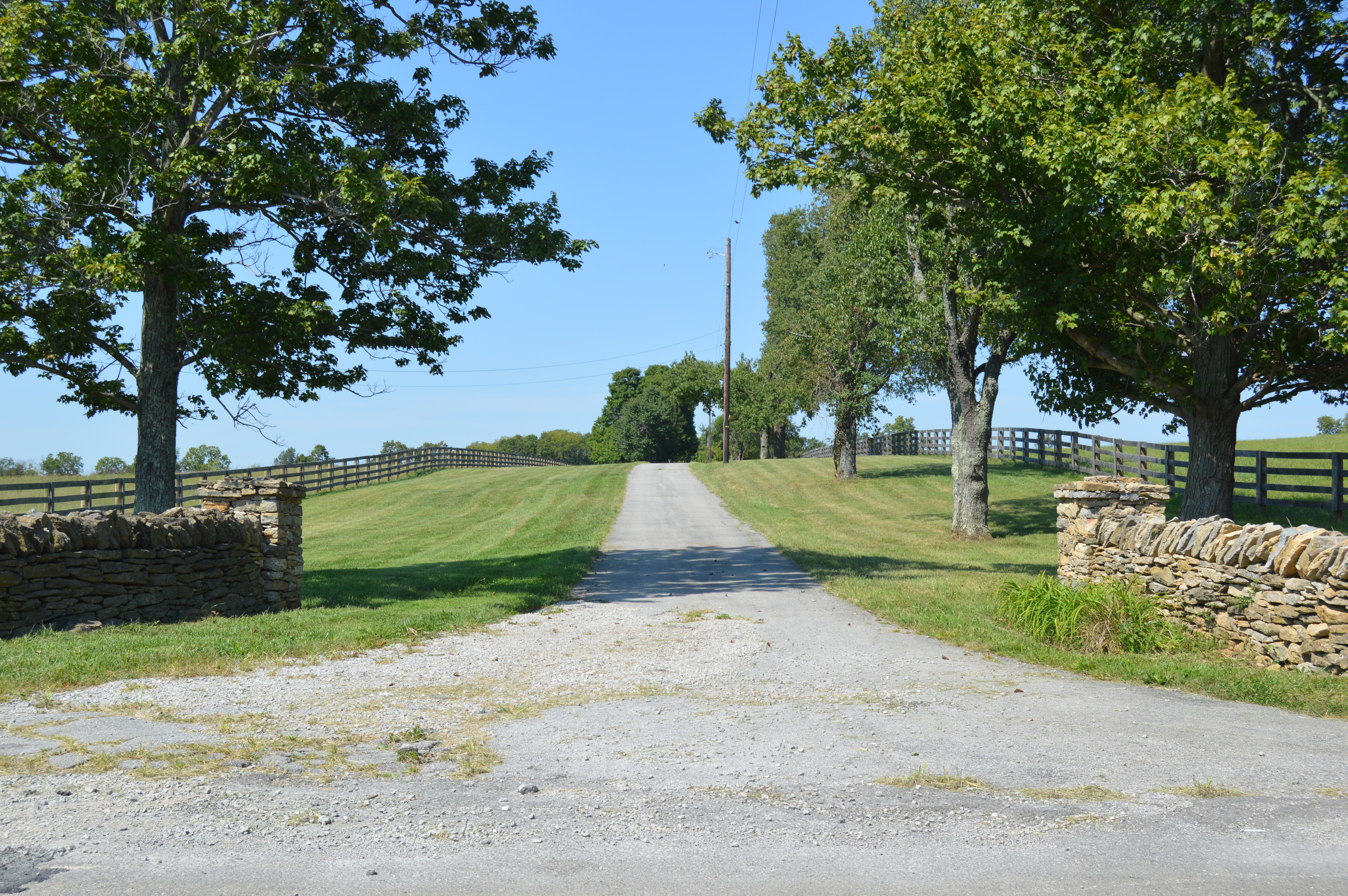
Driveway to estate

It is accessed by a private drive at 4100 Little Rock-Jackstown Rd. The listing includes just the one building, and no structures or objects were deemed to be contributing.
