= Stone House on Tanner's Creek =

Historic house in Kentucky, United States

- U.S. National Register of Historic Places
- Location within Kentucky Location within the United States
- Nearest city: Salvisa, Kentucky
- Coordinates: 37°58′49″N 84°45′29″W
- Area: 1 acre (0.40 ha)
- Built: c.1800
- Architectural style: Federal
- MPS: Early Stone Buildings of Central Kentucky TR
- NRHP reference No.: 83002913
- Added to NRHP: June 23, 1983

Stone House on Tanner's Creek is located near Salvisa, Kentucky in the United States. It was built in about 1800 and added to the National Register of Historic Places in 1983.

It is a one-and-a-half-story hall-parlor house with a stone kitchen that is now attached.

When listed it had stonework in excellent condition, including mostly original mortar.
