= Cynthiana Commercial District =

Historic district in Kentucky, United States

- U.S. National Register of Historic Places
- U.S. Historic district
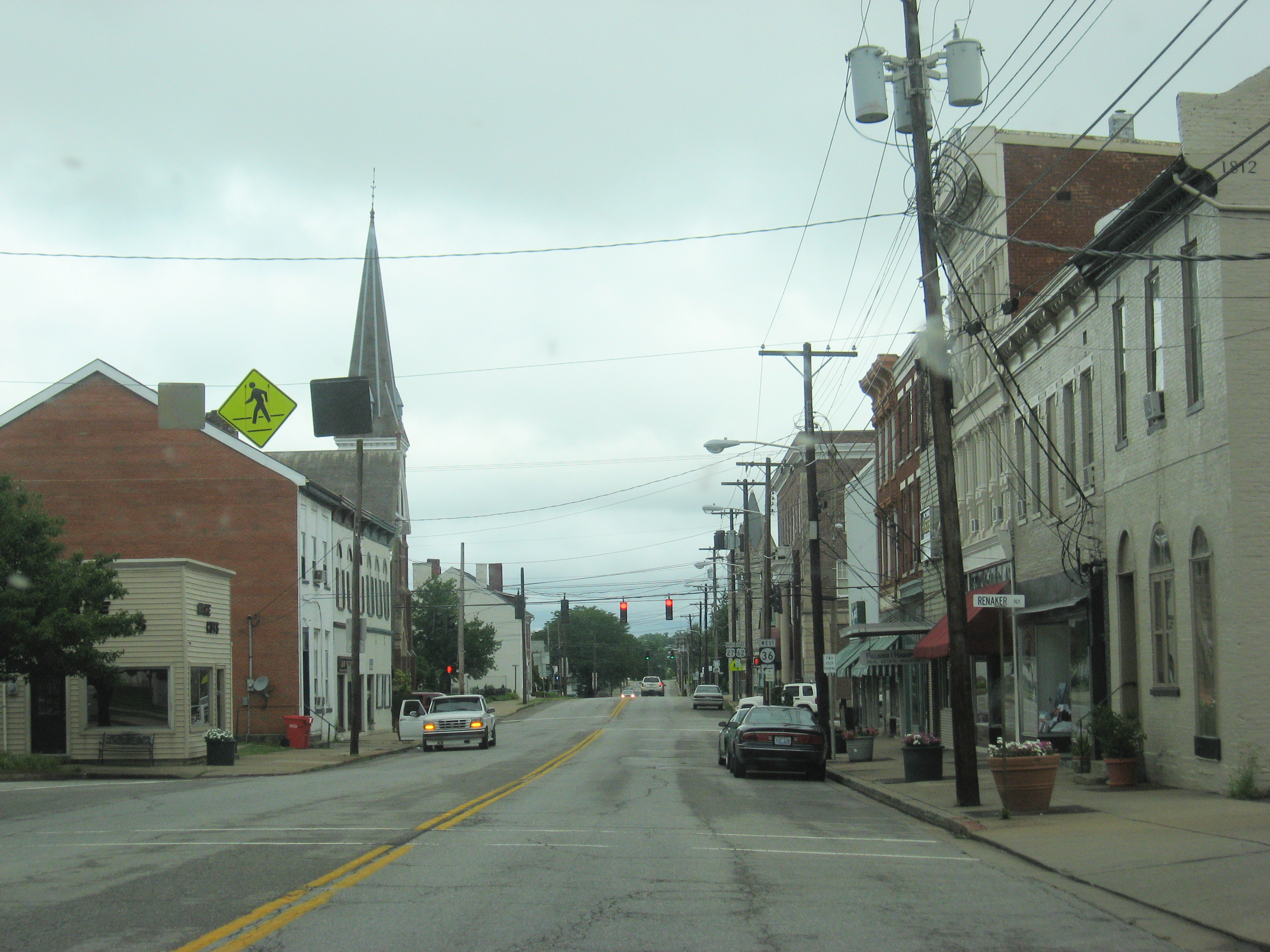

- Location within Kentucky Location within the United States
- Location: Pike St. from Church to Main Sts., and Main St. from Bridge to Pleasant Sts., Cynthiana, Kentucky
- Coordinates: 38°23′29″N 84°24′40″W
- Area: 15 acres (6.1 ha)
- Built: 1820
- Architectural style: Late 19th And 20th Century Revivals, Late Victorian
- NRHP reference No.: 82001567
- Added to NRHP: October 19, 1982

The Cynthiana Commercial District is a 15 acres (6.1 ha) historic district in Cynthiana, Kentucky which was listed on the National Register of Historic Places in 1982. It included 67 contributing buildings.

It includes the core of Cynthiana's late 1800s commercial architecture, in two blocks of South Main Street from Bridge Street to Pleasant Street, and two blocks of East Pike Street from South Main Street to Church Street.

It includes the Harrison County Courthouse, which is separately listed on the National Register, and Cynthiana's City Hall.
