= Stone House on Kentucky River =

Historic house in Kentucky, United States

- U.S. National Register of Historic Places
- Location within Kentucky Location within the United States
- Location: KY 55, Prestonville, Kentucky
- Coordinates: 38°40′24″N 85°11′36″W
- Area: 48 acres (19 ha)
- Built: c.1835
- Architectural style: Greek Revival, Federal, Transitional Federal-Greek
- MPS: Early Stone Buildings of Kentucky Outer Bluegrass and Pennyrile TR
- NRHP reference No.: 87000151
- Added to NRHP: January 8, 1987

Stone House on Kentucky River is located in Prestonville, Kentucky. It was built in 1835 and added to the National Register of Historic Places on January 8, 1987.

It is located on Kentucky River. It is a five bay, two-story, central passage, dry stone house, about 22 by 46 feet (6.7 m × 14.0 m) in plan, built in about 1835. It has a two-story, two bay ell built at the same time.

It is one of two known dry-stone houses in Carroll County. It was deemed notable as "a good and rare example of the transitional Federal/Greek Revival period."
