= Owen-Gay Farm =

- U.S. National Register of Historic Places
- U.S. Historic district
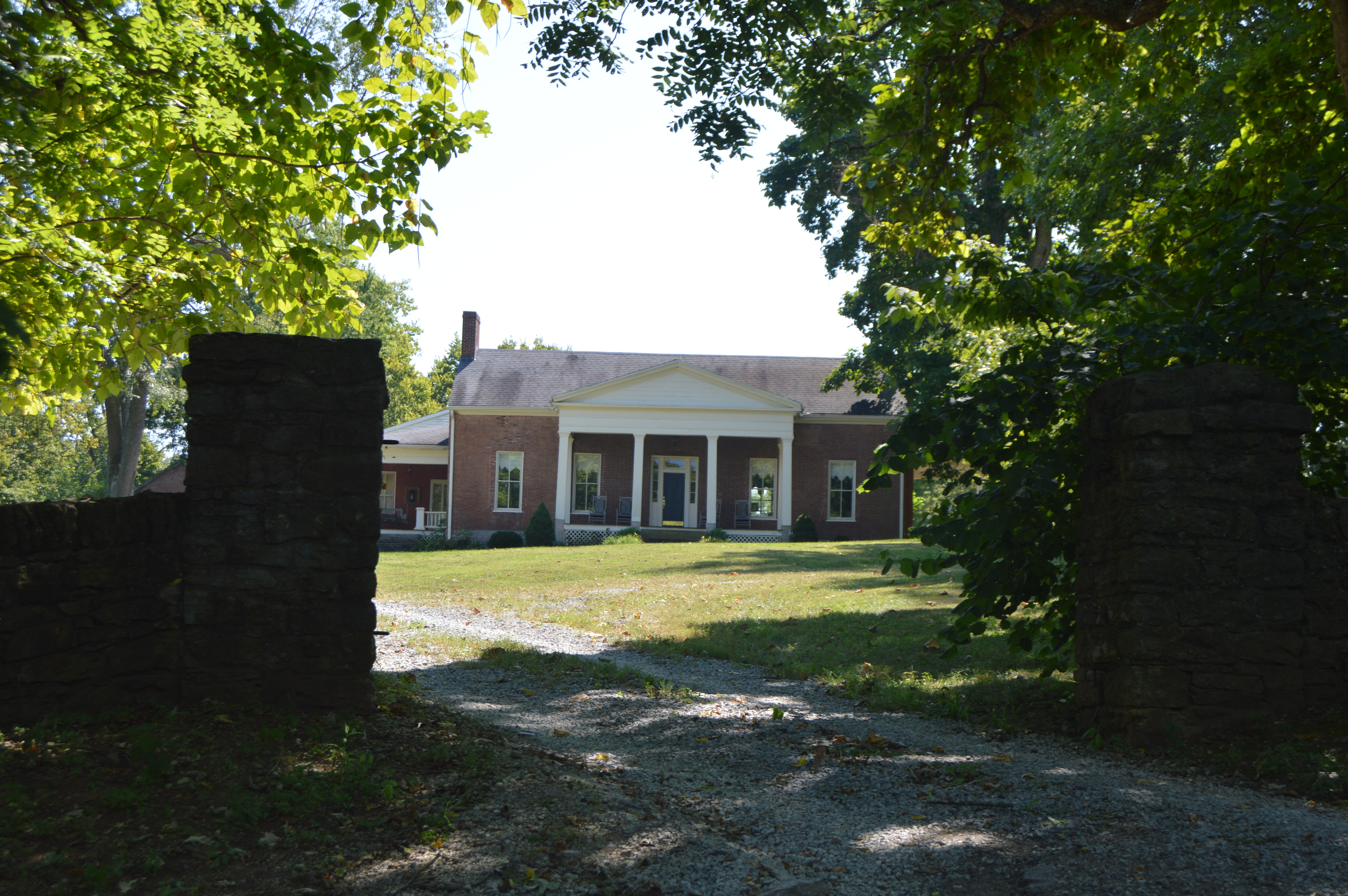
- Farmhouse, in Clark County. Photographer and some farm outbuildings located in other county

- Location within Kentucky Location within the United States
- Nearest city: Winchester, Kentucky
- Coordinates: 38°06′24″N 84°06′56″W
- Area: 238 acres (96 ha)
- Built: 1817, 1825-1840, c.1945
- Architectural style: Queen Anne
- NRHP reference No.: 97000163
- Added to NRHP: March 13, 1997

The Owen-Gay Farm in Clark County and Bourbon County in Kentucky was listed on the National Register of Historic Places in 1997. The property included two contributing buildings, nine contributing structures and one contributing site, on 238 acres (96 ha).

It is located on Gay Rd. at its junction with Donaldson Rd., at the Clark County-Bourbon County line. The house, built in 1825–1840, and 119 acres (48 ha) is in Clark County; some outbuildings and the other 119 acres (48 ha) are in Bourbon County.

It includes:

- the house (1825–1840)
- a log house (c. 1817), designated BB-362 and known as Glocca Morra School in the Kentucky Heritage Council's Historic Sites Inventory
- a meathouse (c. 1825)
- Ice House ruins (c. 1825)
- cistern (1915–1920)
- concrete water tank (c. 1945)
- hay barn (c. 1900)
- metal crib (1930–1940)
- an undefined structure (c. 1900)
- cattle barn (1910–1920)
- sheep weigh house (c. 1910)

as well as agricultural acreage, fences, cemetery, and the farm's residential area which make up a contributing site.
