= Stone House of Indian Creek =

Historic house in Kentucky, United States

- U.S. National Register of Historic Places
- Location within Kentucky Location within the United States
- Nearest city: Cynthiana, Kentucky
- Coordinates: 38°25′6″N 84°16′20″W
- Area: 1.4 acres (0.57 ha)
- Built: 1810
- Architectural style: Greek Revival, Federal
- MPS: Early Stone Buildings of Central Kentucky TR
- NRHP reference No.: 83002794
- Added to NRHP: June 23, 1983

The Stone House of Indian Creek is located near Cynthiana, Kentucky. It was built in c.1810 and added to the National Register of Historic Places in 1983.

It is a one-and-a-half-story central passage plan brick house with a dry stone wing added c.1830.
