= Harrison County Courthouse (Kentucky) =

- U.S. National Register of Historic Places
- U.S. Historic district – Contributing property
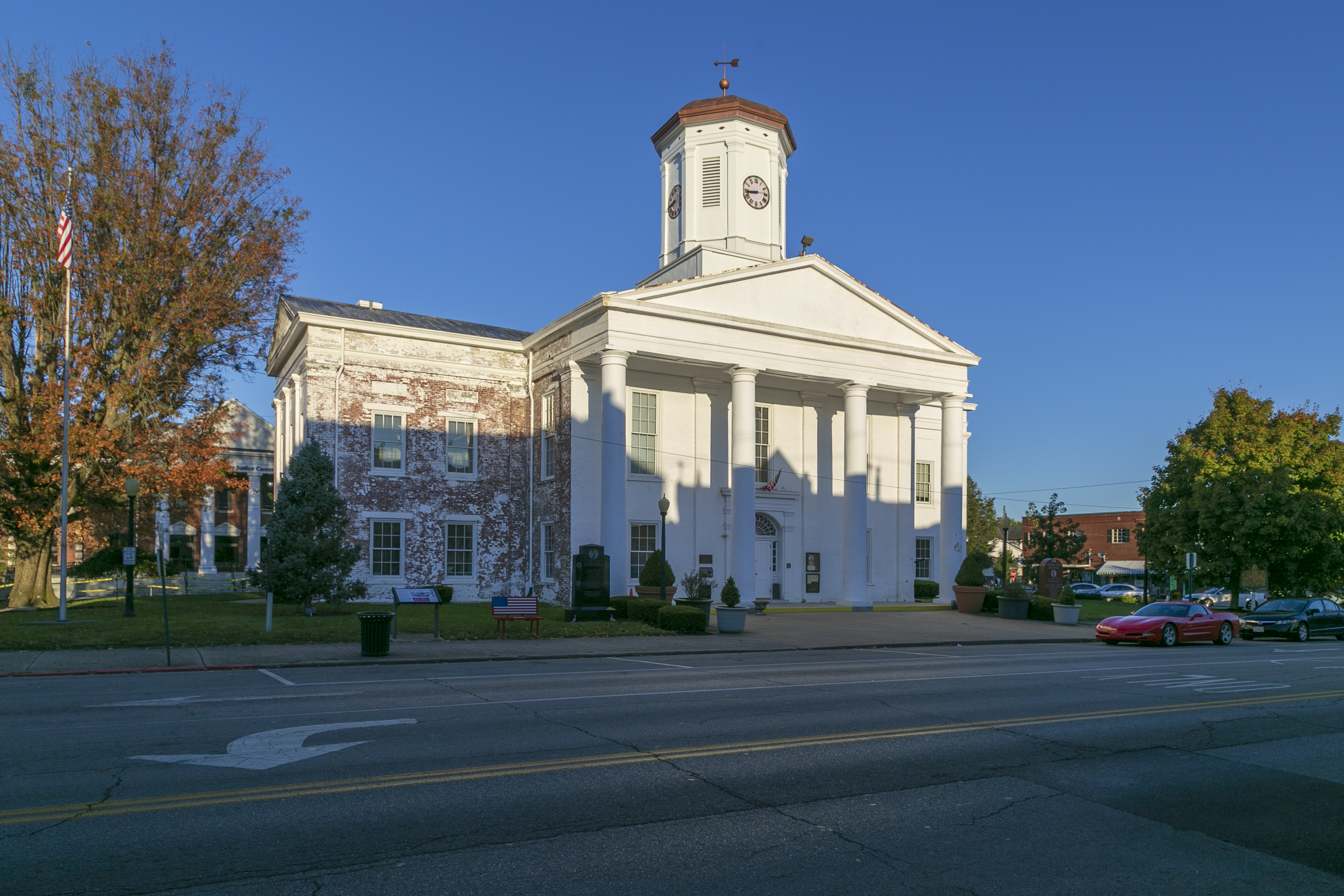
- Location: 100 Main Street, Cynthiana, Kentucky
- Coordinates: 38°23′21″N 84°17′52″W
- Area: 1 acre (0.40 ha)
- Built: 1851
- Built by: John Huddleston
- Architectural style: Greek Revival
- Part of: Cynthiana Commercial District (ID82001567)
- NRHP reference No.: 74000880

Significant dates
- Added to NRHP: December 6, 1974
- Designated CP: October 19, 1982

The Harrison County Courthouse in Cynthiana, Kentucky is a Greek Revival-style courthouse building built in 1851. It was listed on the National Register of Historic Places in 1974.

Located at 100 Main Street, it was built and was perhaps designed by John Huddleston.

It is a contributing building in the 1982 NRHP-listed Cynthiana Commercial District.
