= Cooper's Run Rural Historic District =

- U.S. National Register of Historic Places
- Nearest city: Paris, Kentucky
- Coordinates: 38.2418°N 84.3132°W
- Area: 8,935 acres (36.16 km^{2})
- Built by: Multiple, including John Metcalfe, John Giltner (stonemason)
- Architectural style: Federal, Greek Revival, Gothic Revival
- NRHP reference No.: 98001493
- Added to NRHP: December 23, 1998

Cooper's Run Rural Historic District is a 8,935 acres (36.16 km^{2}) historic district near Paris, Kentucky which was listed on the National Register of Historic Places in 1998.

It includes work by stonemason John Metcalfe and by brick builder John Giltner.

It includes 133 contributing buildings, 29 contributing structures, 80 contributing sites and nine contributing objects.
