= Thomas Champ House =

Historic house in Kentucky, United States

- U.S. National Register of Historic Places
- U.S. Historic district
- Location within Kentucky Location within the United States
- Location: Lexington and Maysville Rd. (U.S. Route 68), near Paris, Kentucky
- Coordinates: 38°15′41″N 84°11′31″W
- Area: 5 acres (2.0 ha)
- Built: 1825
- Architectural style: Federal
- NRHP reference No.: 03000256
- Added to NRHP: June 19, 2003

The Thomas Champ House near Paris, Kentucky was built in 1825. It was listed on the National Register of Historic Places in 2003.

It is located on Lexington and Maysville Rd. (U.S. Route 68). It has also been known as Sulpher Spring Farm and as Long Champ Farm. It includes two contributing buildings and a contributing site.

It includes a main house, a smokehouse, a cemetery, a garage, and a pair of entrance gates.
