= Paris Depot =

- Paris Railroad Depot
- U.S. National Register of Historic Places
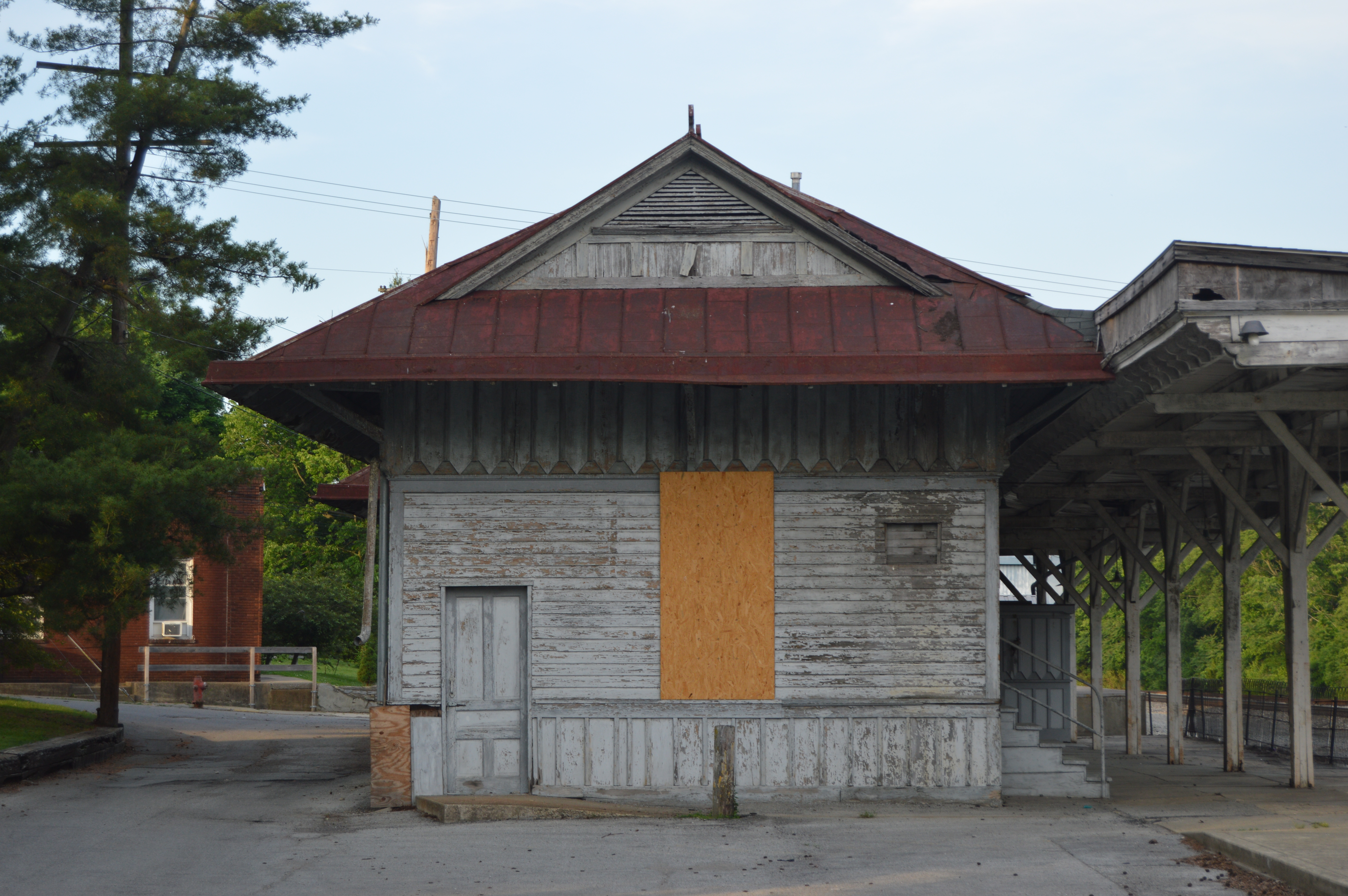
- Location: Between 10th St. and Winchester Pike
- Coordinates: 38.2069°N 84.2515°W
- NRHP reference No.: 73000785
- Added to NRHP: April 11, 1973

Paris Depot is a former railway station in Paris, Kentucky.

== History ==
In 1853, the Kentucky Central Railroad was completed from Lexington to Paris, under the name of the Lexington and Covington Railroad, and the first train passed between Lexington and Paris on December 22 of that year. The depot was shared with the Frankfort and Cincinnati Railroad. The modern station building was constructed by the Louisville and Nashville Railroad in 1882. It was enlarged in 1904 and again in 1911. After passenger service ended in 1968 with the Flamingo discontinued, the railroad gifted the depot to the city of Paris.

The city proceeded to converted the space to a senior center. It was added to the National Register of Historic Places on April 11, 1973. The building housed a restaurant in the 1980–90s and again by 2001. After years of neglect, the station's land was purchased from CSX, successor of the L&N, in 2017 by the Poynter family, who also purchased the building for $1 from the city under the stipulation that it be restored. The building was renovated in the 2010s and converted to a restaurant.

Preceding station	Louisville and Nashville Railroad	Following station
Kiserton toward Cincinnati	Cincinnati – Atlanta	Escondida toward Atlanta
