= Paris Courthouse Square Historic District =

Historic district in Kentucky, United States

- U.S. National Register of Historic Places
- U.S. Historic district
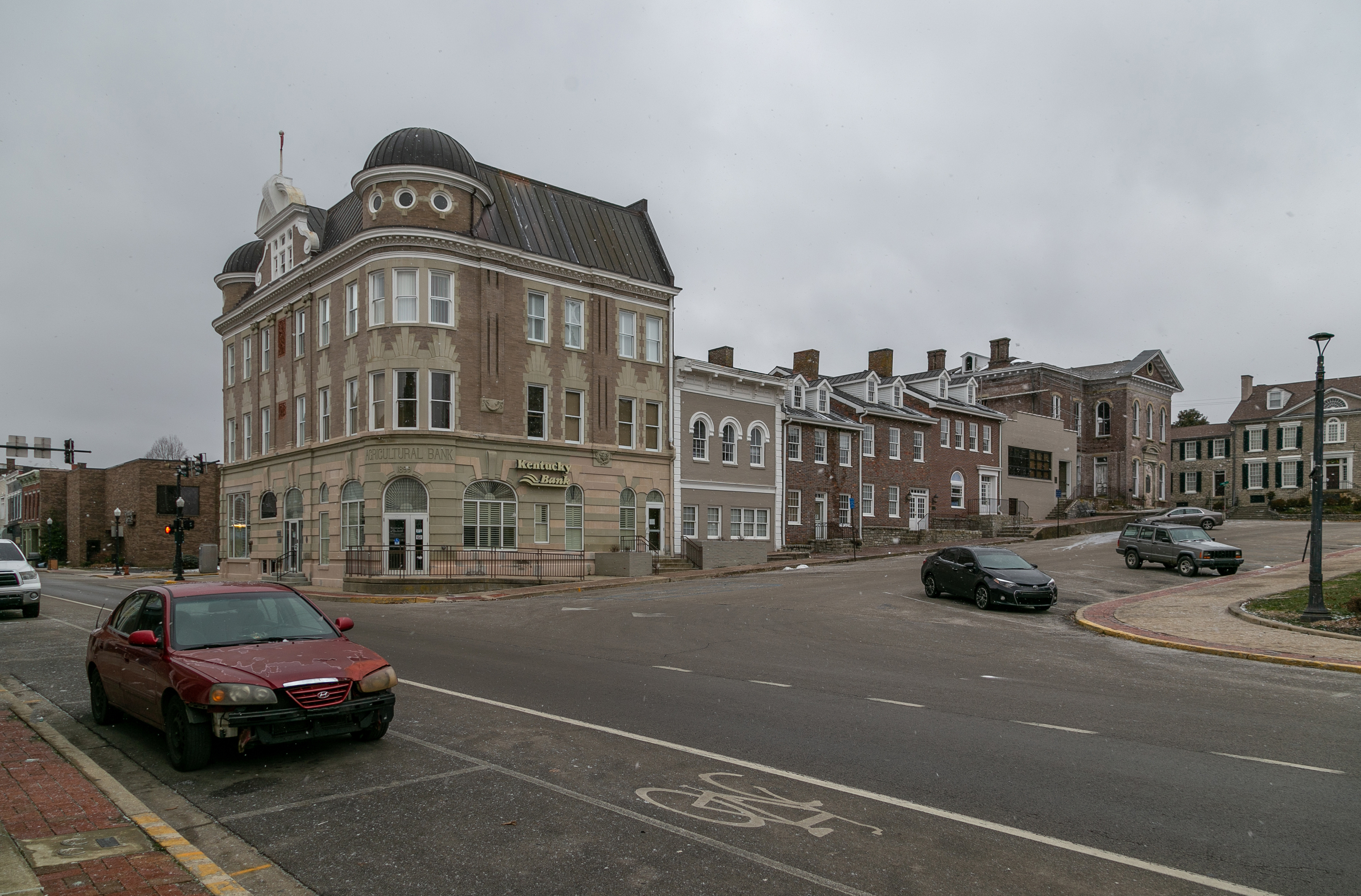

- Location within Kentucky Location within the United States
- Location: Courthouse Square and environs, Paris, Kentucky
- Coordinates: 38°12′47″N 84°15′00″W
- Area: 4 acres (1.6 ha)
- Built: 1788, other
- Architectural style: Italianate
- Part of: Downtown Paris Historic District (ID89002123)
- NRHP reference No.: 79000963

Significant dates
- Added to NRHP: January 25, 1979
- Designated HD: December 15, 1989

The Paris Courthouse Square Historic District, in Paris, Kentucky, is a 4 acres (1.6 ha) historic district which was listed on the National Register of Historic Places in 1979. The listing included 21 contributing buildings.

It includes:

- Bourbon County Courthouse (1902–05), designed by Frank P. Milburn, which is separately listed on the National Register
- Duncan Tavern, which is separately listed on the National Register
- The Memorial Building (1859), which served as a bank and residence until 1884, and later served World War I veterans and others
- Teen Square (1960s), a one-story brick building
- Ewalt Building (c.1840), a Greek Revival townhouse

It includes Italianate and other architecture.

The entire district was included in the 1989-listed Downtown Paris Historic District.
