= Downtown Paris Historic District =

- U.S. National Register of Historic Places
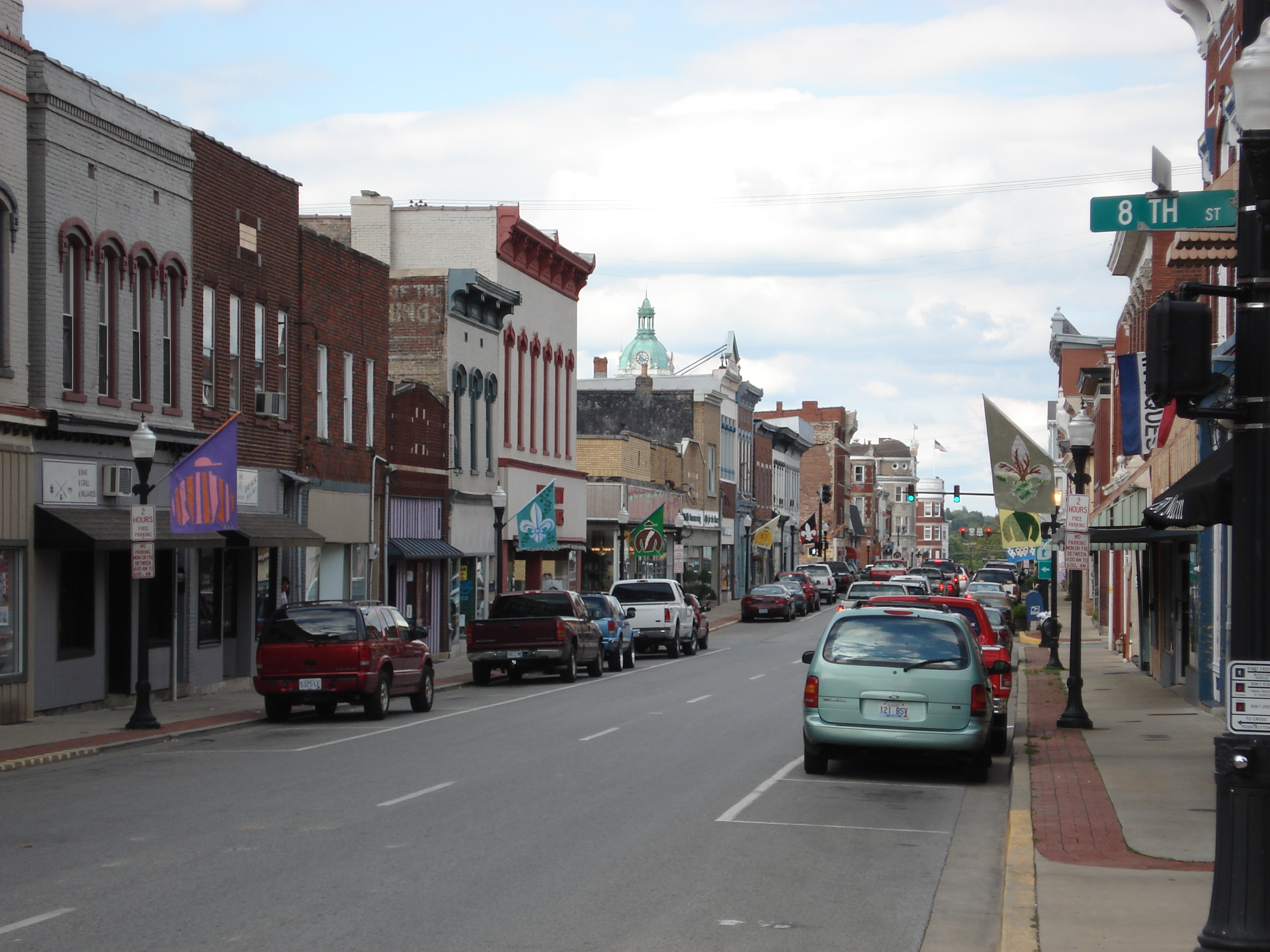

- Location within Kentucky Location within the United States
- Location: Roughly bounded by 2nd St., Pleasant St., Main St., High St., and 12th St., Paris, Kentucky
- Coordinates: 38.209167°N 84.252778°W
- Area: 96 acres (39 ha)
- Architect: Frank Milburn, others
- Architectural style: Italianate, Queen Anne, Romanesque
- NRHP reference No.: 89002123
- Added to NRHP: December 15, 1989

The Downtown Paris Historic District, in Paris, Kentucky, in Bourbon County, Kentucky, is a historic district which was listed on the National Register of Historic Places in 1989.

It was deemed significant as:

the largest, richest, most varied and best-preserved concentration of historic architecture in Bourbon County from the period c. 1788 to 1940. Included within the district are a commercial area, an adjacent cluster of warehouse buildings, and a surrounding residential neighborhood. All of these discrete areas manifest a high degree of integrity with comparatively few intrusions, over one-and-a-half centuries of the city's architectural evolution are depicted by the district, which includes excellent representations of a remarkable variety of historic styles. Included are many fine examples of the Italianate, Queen Anne and Romanesque Revival modes in both residential and commercial buildings. The Federal, Gothic Revival, and Greek Revival styles are represented as well, as are the Stick, Beaux Arts, Colonial Revival, Craftsman, and Moderne modes. Also featured throughout the district are many noteworthy examples of vernacular designs in residential and commercial structures. A number of landmark religious, governmental and institutional buildings add interest to the district's streetscapes. The district features the works of several local builder/architects as well as those of some noted designers from outside the area. The Downtown Paris Historic District manifests a high degree of integrity with comparatively few intrusions.

It is centered on High, Main, and Pleasant Streets, and runs from 2nd St. on the north to 14th St. on the south. The 96 acres (39 ha) district included 222 contributing buildings, 77 non-contributing buildings, and 15 contributing structures. Contributing ones date from 1788 to 1939.

Twenty-two of the contributing buildings were already listed on the National Register. These include:

- Bourbon County Courthouse (1902), "a monumental example of the Beaux-Arts style", designed by architect Frank Milburn (1868–1926). NRHP-listed in 1973
- Additional buildings surrounding the courthouse square, included in the NRHP listing of the Paris Courthouse Square Historic District in 1979:
  - Duncan Tavern, "a former hostelry of stone construction and Georgian/Federal design, separately NRHP-listed in 1973.
  - Elks/Masonic Lodge Building (1901-05), Bank Row and Main Street: "The Elks/Masonic Lodge Building, one o£ the pivotal structures of the Courthouse Square, is prominently sited at the corner of Bank Row and Main Streets. One of the tallest buildings in Paris, it stands four stories high, and the narrowness of its primary facade lends it a sense of verticality. The building is faced with dark-red pressed brick and is trimmed with a profusion of pressed-metal and smooth-faced sandstone. Its eclectic design, largely Neo-classical in inspiration, nonetheless includes some suggestions of the Romanesque Revival. The main facade is dominated by a slightly projecting pavilion, four stories high, that contains the entrance to former lodge rooms on the upper levels. This feature is balanced by a three-story semi-circular turret supported by an iron column. Beneath the turret is the building's main entrance, contained in a chamfered corner. The Elks/Masonic Lodge Building, designed by architect Herman Rowe of Lexington, was constructed in the early 1900's. Intended to accommodate a variety of uses, it was built as the headquarters for the local Elks lodge, with commercial space occupying the first floor. The building was later occupied by the local Masonic chapter, and in the 1940's became home to the Bourbon Hotel, a hostelry formerly located across the street. After years of neglect, the building was recently restored by the local Community Redevelopment Agency as apartments for the elderly."
    "The former Masonic Building (see photo 5) is a key corner edifice in the district. Erected ca. 1900, it has four stories and is of brick construction with stone trim above all windows. The southern corner is bowed, a pair of oriel windows is on the southwestern wall} and the main facade is treated with a fine embossed metal parapet. Built for the Paris lodge of the B.P.O.E., the structure was sold to the local Masonic Lodge in 1926. The upper floors served for many years as the Bourbon Hotel until being converted into apartments, and the first floor has housed a succession of businesses since the hotel went out of business. Present plans call for utilizing the building as apartments for the elderly."
  - Bourbon Agricultural Bank and Trust Building (remodelled 1915), Main & 4th Sts. Three-and-a-half-story building of largest bank (as of 1979) in Bourbon County, Kentucky, formed from mergers of five banks. Building constructed in late 1800s, renovated to its current form in 1915 after the last of the five mergers. The Kentuckian-Citizen, a local newspaper, then described it as having the "most commodious and convenient banking rooms in central Kentucky."
    "This three-and-one-half-story structure has bowed corner projections on the main facade, and these continue up and into the attic where they are covered by hemispherical domes and are pierced by oculi. Decorative stonework embellishes the windows, and a continuous dentilled cornice is below the attic level. In the center of the facade is a shaped gable, and there are four Ionic pilasters arranged below the gable. A pseudo-Georgian veneer has been attached to the street level in recent years. / The institution as it is now began in 1915 with a capital stock of $200,000."
  - Simms Building (1885), 302 Main St. "The two-story, three-bay brick building on the western corner of Main and Third Streets (see photo 4) was built for W.E. Simms in 1885, and the only major exterior alteration has been the installation of larger windows on the street front. This level is framed by metal pilasters and a projecting fascia, and the emphatic hoodmolds above the second floor's windows are reciprocal with the heavy entablature that has a peak in the center."
- Eads Tavern (c. 1790), also NRHP-listed in 1973.
- The Stick Style former passenger depot of the Kentucky Central Railroad (c. 1882 1901–07), also NRHP-listed in 1973.

Selected others include:

- St. Paul's Methodist Episcopal Church (1876) "Well-preserved nave-plan front-gabled brick church of transitional Greek Revival/Italianate character, built on a raised foundation approached by a broad flight of steps. Facade and side elevations are articulated by pilasters and contain round-arched bays with brick hoodmolds. St. Paul's Church is the largest of several churches in Paris constructed for black congregations during the post-Civil War era."
- Brannon House (c.1910s), 1115 Main Street: "a Craftsman-inspired American Foursquare brick dwelling dating from the 1910's. Broad in form, the Brannon House stands two stories high with a symmetrical three-bay facade, gently-pitched hipped roof, massive dormers, and exposed rafter tails."
- Catholic Church of the Annunciation (1858–60; 1869–70), 1009 Main Street: "Well-preserved Victorian Gothic church constructed 1858-60 and enlarged 1869-70. Exhibits a Latin cross plan with polygonal apse, full-height transepts, and lower side chambers. Tripartite facade exhibits three doorways set in lancet-arched spandrels, and side elevations are punctuated by lancet arches, with label molds, articulated by partial buttresses. Three-stage steeple rises to a fluted spire. Interior has been little altered since the Victorian era."
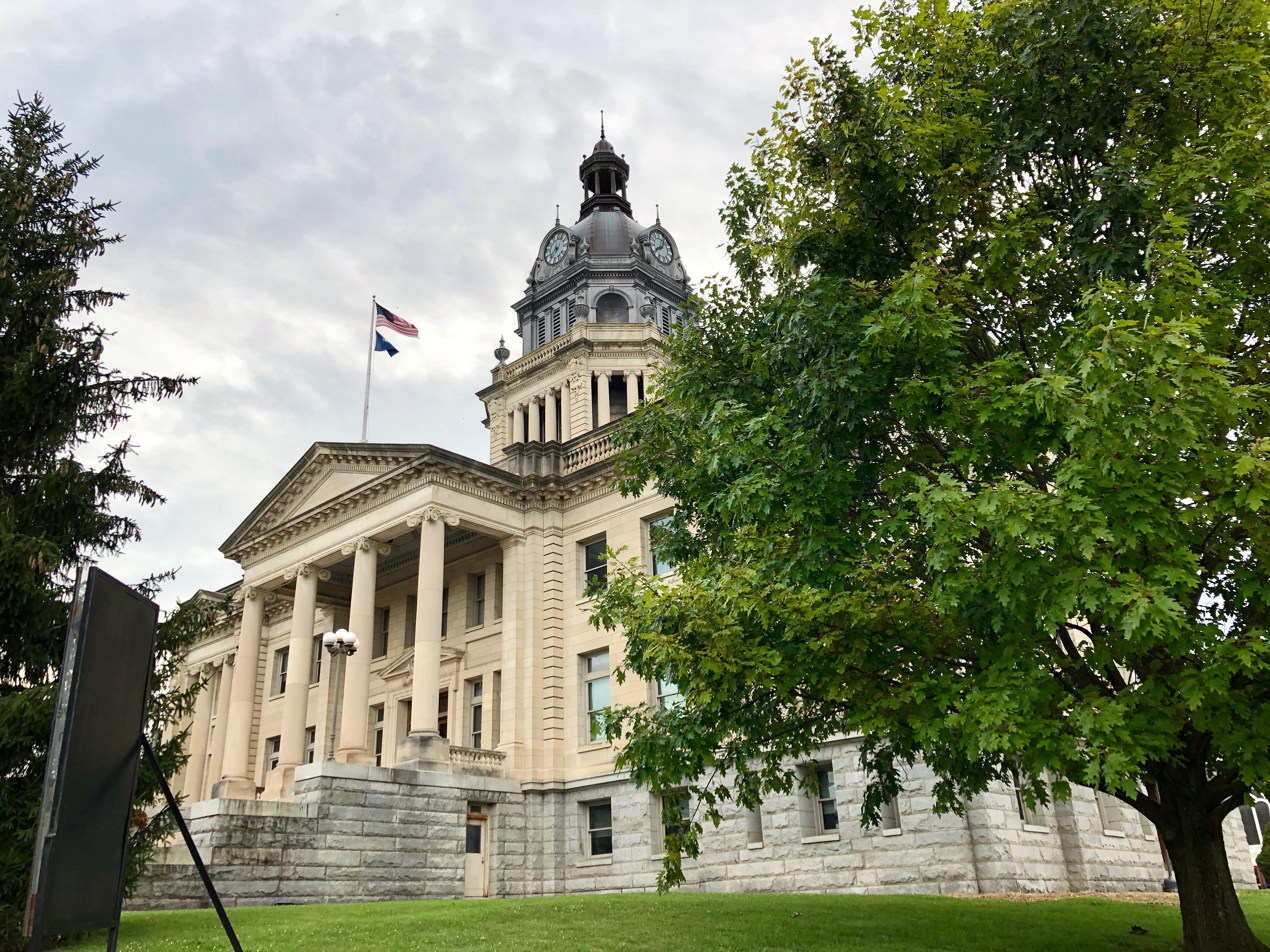
Courthouse in 2019

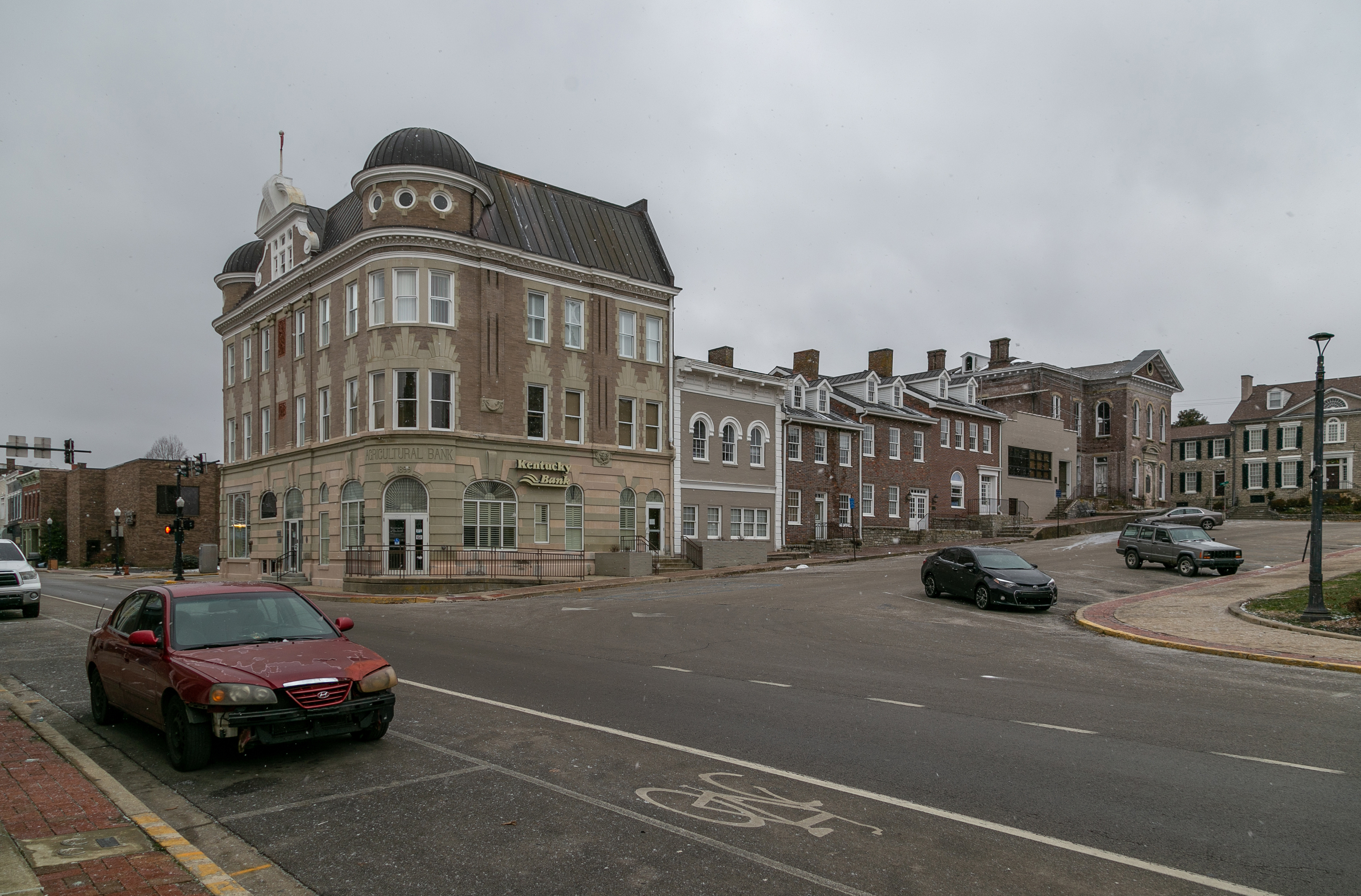
Courthouse Square buildings, including Bourbon Agricultural Bank and Trust Building (completed 1915) at left, in 2019

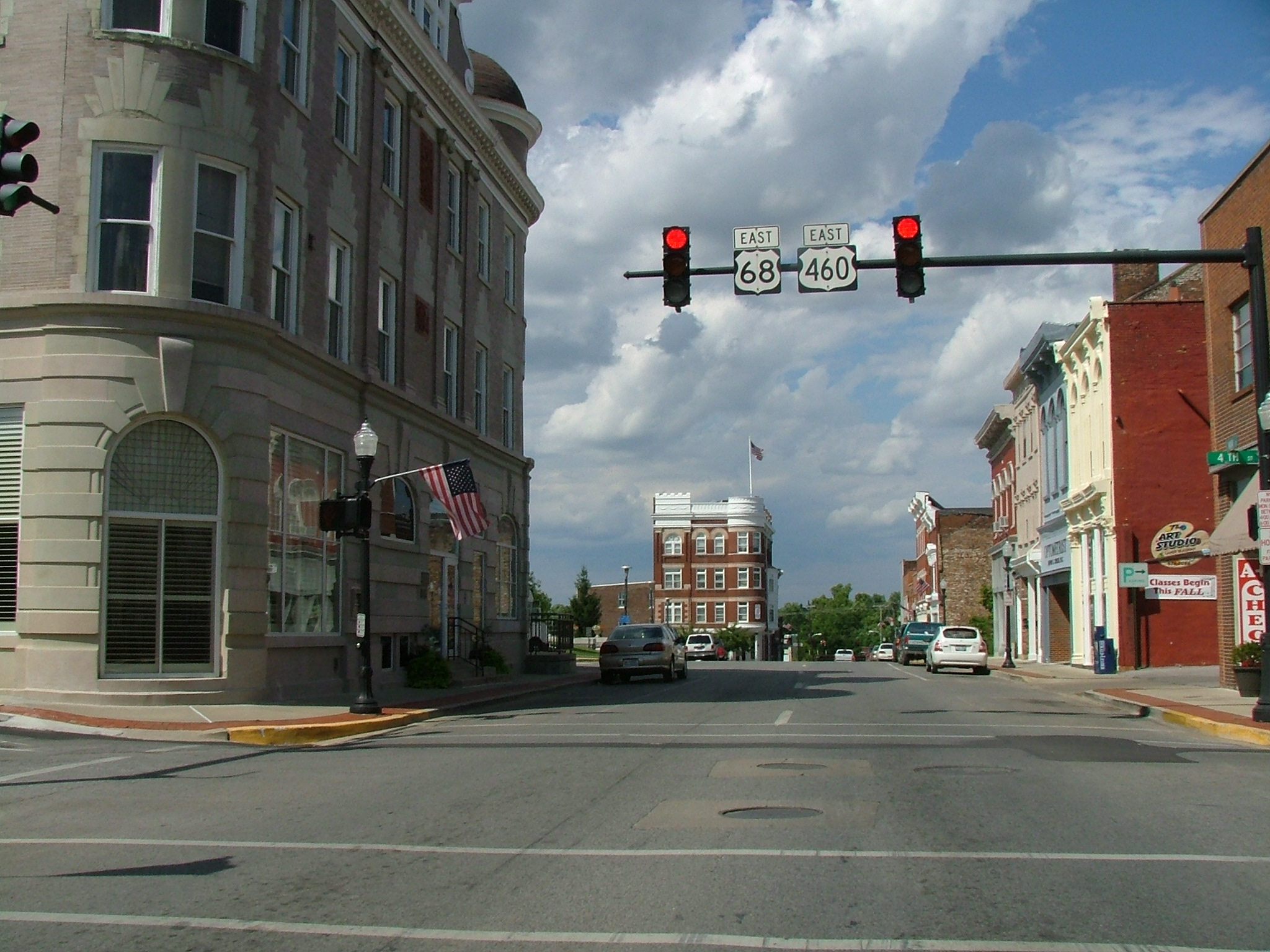
2007 streetscape with Elks/Masonic Lodge Building (1901-05) at center, far away

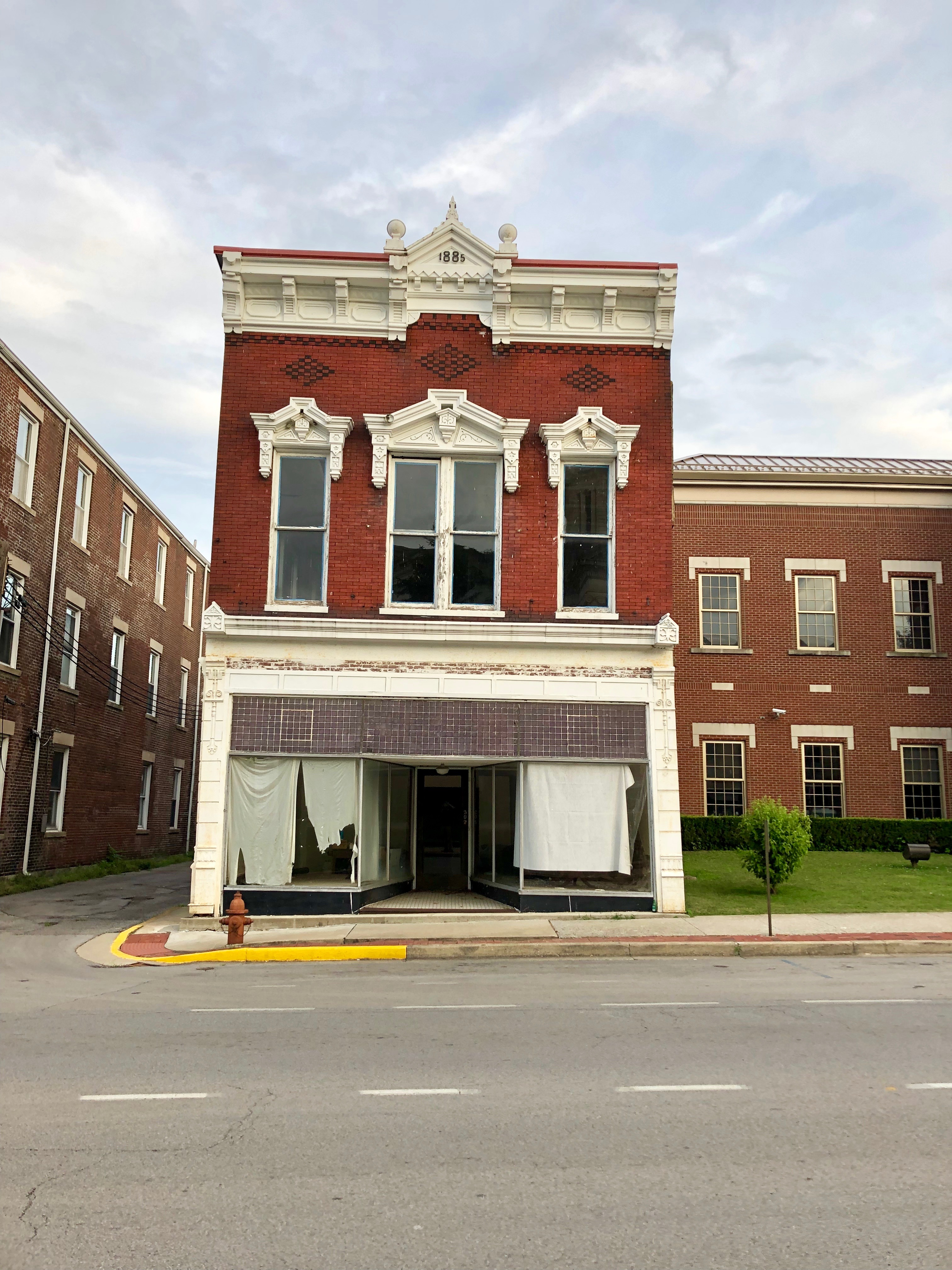
Simms Building (1885) in 2019

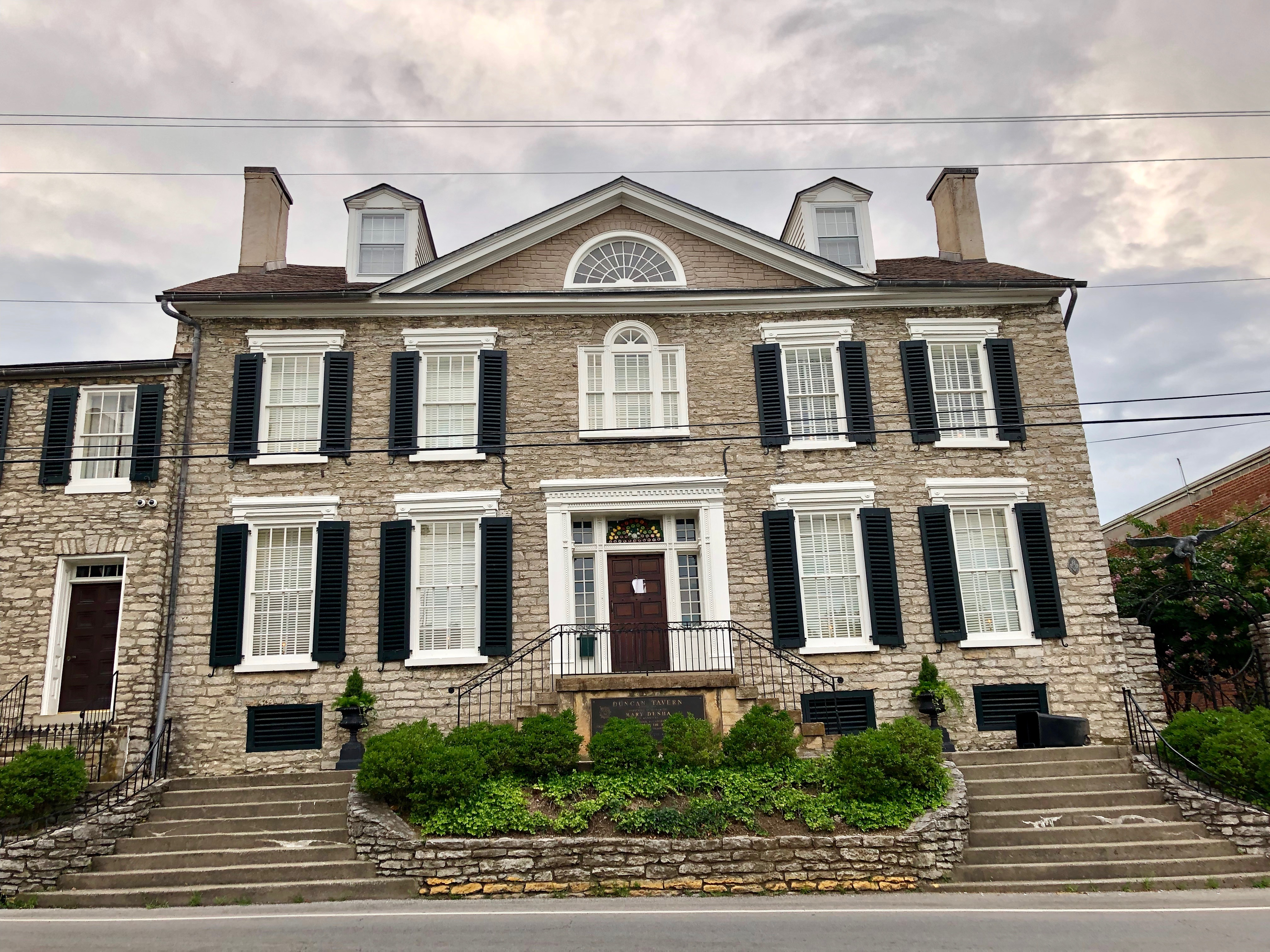
Duncan Tavern in 2019

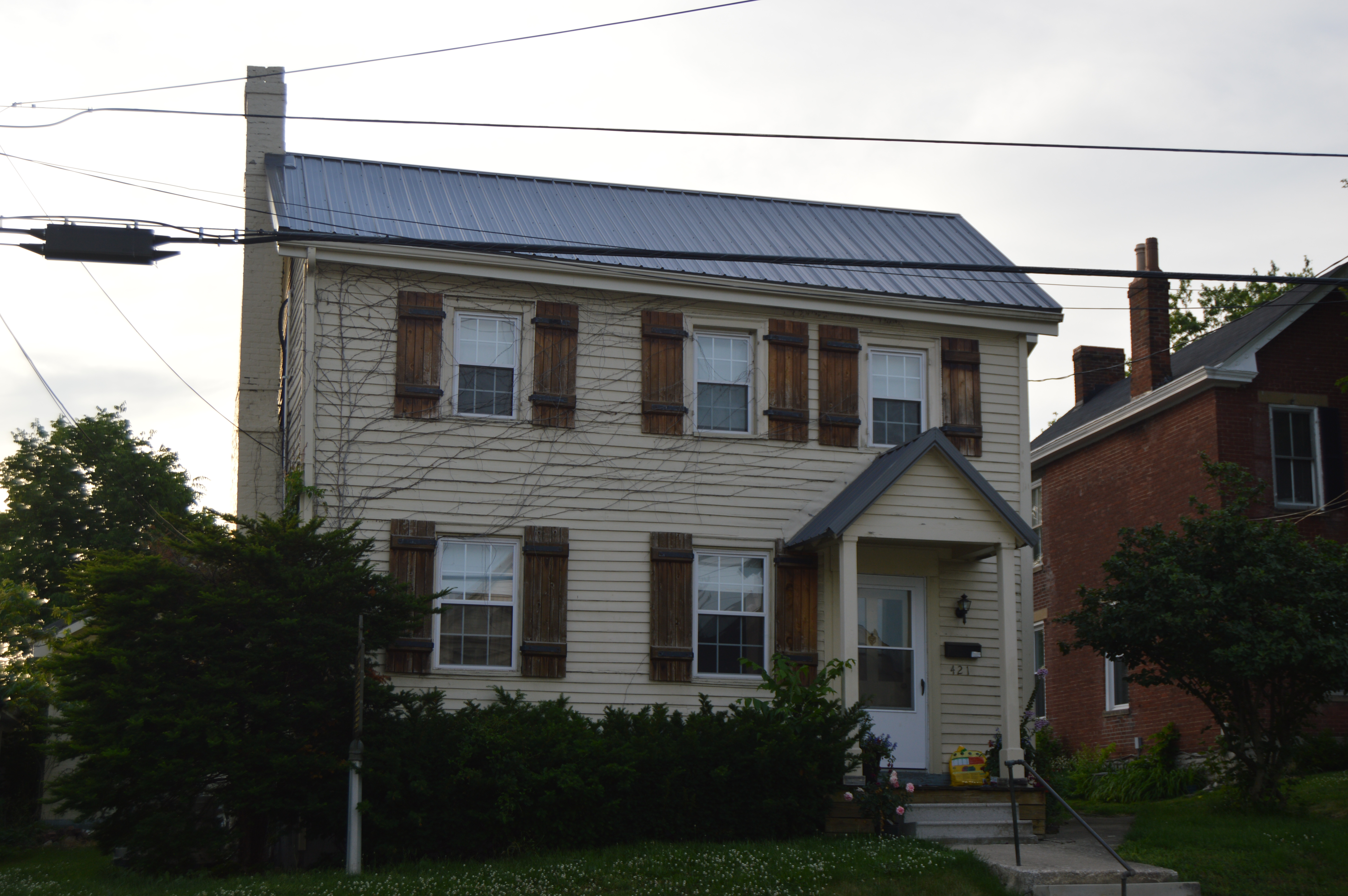
Eades Tavern in 2014
