= Haviland House =

- U.S. National Register of Historic Places
- Location within Kentucky Location within the United States
- Location: Off U.S. Route 62, near Cynthiana, Kentucky
- Coordinates: 38°25′28″N 84°15′54″W
- Area: 0.2 acres (0.081 ha)
- Architectural style: Federal
- MPS: Early Stone Buildings of Central Kentucky TR
- NRHP reference No.: 83002787
- Added to NRHP: June 23, 1983

The Haviland House, in Harrison County, Kentucky near Cynthiana, was listed on the National Register of Historic Places in 1983.

It is a four-bay one-and-a-half-story hall-parlor plan dry stone house, built in the early 1800s. It is said to have been built by a Frenchman who built this and two others in the area for his children.
