= E.L. Ehlen Livery and Sale Stable =

- Ehlen, E. L., Livery and Sale Stable
- U.S. National Register of Historic Places
- Location within Kentucky Location within the United States
- Location: 110 First St., Henderson, Kentucky
- Coordinates: 37°50′22″N 87°35′36″W
- Area: less than one acre
- Built: 1897
- Architectural style: Late 19th and Early 20th Century American Movements
- NRHP reference No.: 89002007
- Added to NRHP: November 16, 1989

The E. L. Ehlen Livery and Sale Stable, at 110 First St. in Henderson, Kentucky, was built in 1897. It was listed on the National Register of Historic Places in 1989.

In 1989 the building was deemed "architecturally and historically significant in the commercial history of Henderson, Kentucky. The property is an unusually good example of turn-of-the-century service businesses architecture of the time. Although not a highly visible Main Street retail establishment, the property's facade displays a pleasing design of brick arch-work within a recessed plane. The property is in good condition and a high degree of integrity has been maintained."

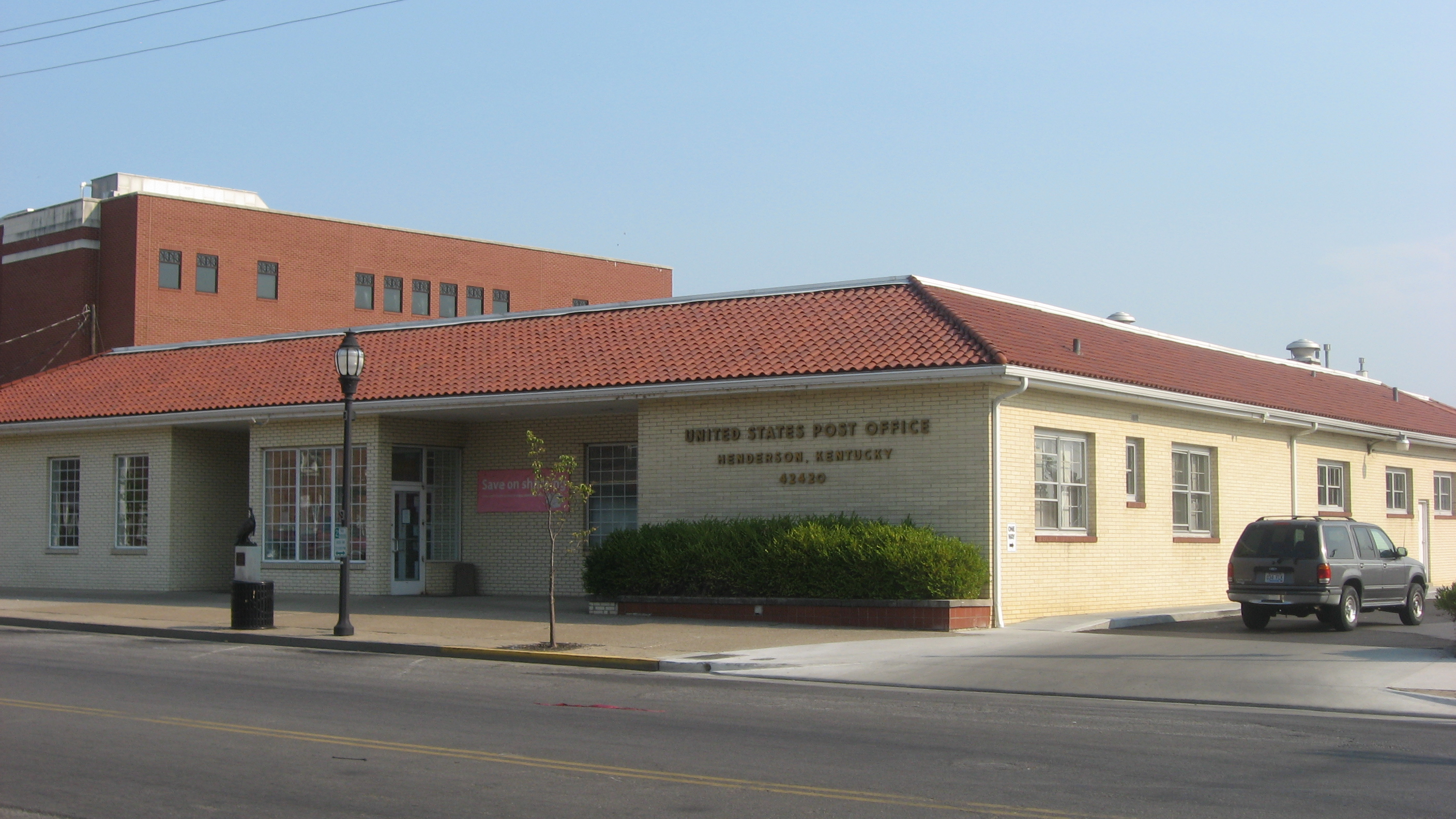
Henderson post office, on the site

== See also ==
- John Lair House and Stables: National Register of Historic Places listing in Renfro Valley, Kentucky
- National Register of Historic Places listings in Henderson County, Kentucky
