= Rockcastle County, Kentucky =

County in Kentucky, United States

- County
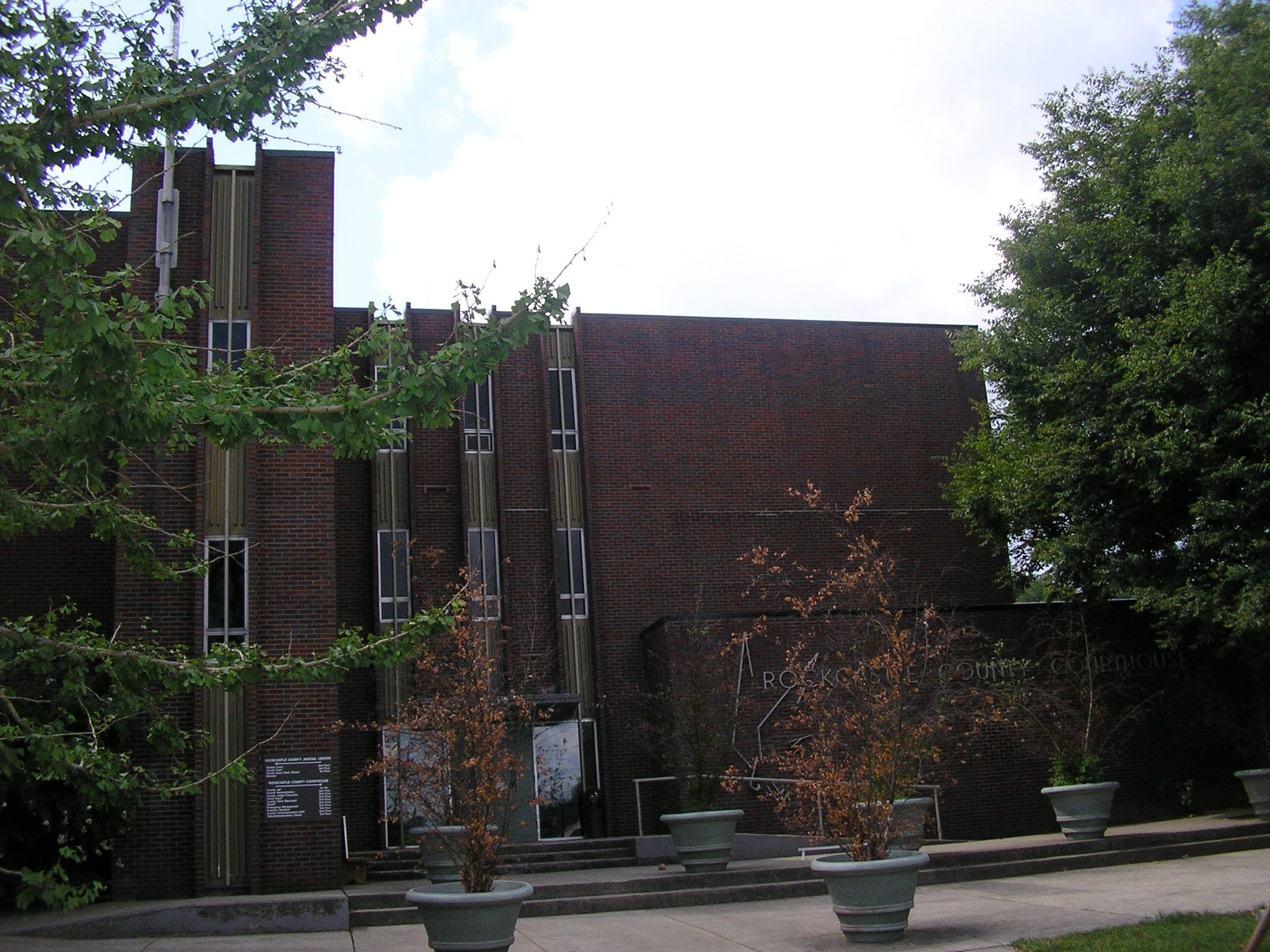
- Rockcastle County courthouse in Mount Vernon

- Location within the U.S. state of Kentucky
- Coordinates: 37°22′N 84°19′W
- Country: United States
- State: Kentucky
- Founded: 1810
- Named for: Rockcastle River
- Seat: Mount Vernon
- Largest city: Mount Vernon

Government
  - Judge/Executive: Howell Holbrook Jr. (R)

Area
  - Total: 318 sq mi (820 km^{2})
  - Land: 317 sq mi (820 km^{2})
  - Water: 1.6 sq mi (4.1 km^{2}) 0.5%

Population (2020)
  - Total: 16,037
  - Estimate (2025): 16,148 ▲
  - Density: 50.6/sq mi (19.5/km^{2})
- Time zone: UTC−5 (Eastern)
  - Summer (DST): UTC−4 (EDT)
- Congressional district: 5th
- Website: rockcastlecountyky.com

Rockcastle County is a county located in the south-central part of the U.S. state of Kentucky. As of the 2020 census, the population was 16,037. Its county seat is Mt. Vernon.

The county was founded in 1810 and named for the Rockcastle River, which runs through it; the river, in turn, is named for its rock cliffs. Rockcastle County is part of the Richmond-Berea, KY Micropolitan Statistical Area, which is also included in the Lexington-Fayette–Richmond–Frankfort, KY combined statistical area.

== Geography ==
According to the United States Census Bureau, the county has a total area of 318 square miles (820 km^{2}), of which 317 square miles (820 km^{2}) is land and 1.6 square miles (4.1 km^{2}) (0.5%) is water.

=== Adjacent counties ===
  - Northwest • Garrard County
  - North • Madison County
  - West • Lincoln County
  - East • Jackson County
  - Southwest • Pulaski County
  - Southeast • Laurel County

=== National protected area ===
- Daniel Boone National Forest (part)

== Demographics ==
Historical population
Census	Pop.	Note	%±
1820	2,249		—
1830	2,865		27.4%
1840	3,409		19.0%
1850	4,697		37.8%
1860	5,343		13.8%
1870	7,145		33.7%
1880	9,670		35.3%
1890	9,841		1.8%
1900	12,416		26.2%
1910	14,473		16.6%
1920	15,406		6.4%
1930	15,149		−1.7%
1940	17,165		13.3%
1950	13,925		−18.9%
1960	12,334		−11.4%
1970	12,305		−0.2%
1980	13,973		13.6%
1990	14,803		5.9%
2000	16,582		12.0%
2010	17,056		2.9%
2020	16,037		−6.0%
2025 (est.)	16,148	▲	0.7%
U.S. Decennial Census; 1790-1960 1900-1990; 1990-2000 2010-2020

=== 2020 census ===
As of the 2020 census, the county had a population of 16,037. The median age was 44.1 years. 21.7% of residents were under the age of 18 and 19.4% of residents were 65 years of age or older. For every 100 females there were 96.2 males, and for every 100 females age 18 and over there were 94.5 males age 18 and over.

The racial makeup of the county was 95.9% White, 0.4% Black or African American, 0.2% American Indian and Alaska Native, 0.2% Asian, 0.0% Native Hawaiian and Pacific Islander, 0.5% from some other race, and 2.8% from two or more races. Hispanic or Latino residents of any race comprised 1.1% of the population.

0.0% of residents lived in urban areas, while 100.0% lived in rural areas.

There were 6,546 households in the county, of which 28.8% had children under the age of 18 living with them and 26.4% had a female householder with no spouse or partner present. About 28.8% of all households were made up of individuals and 13.6% had someone living alone who was 65 years of age or older.

There were 7,321 housing units, of which 10.6% were vacant. Among occupied housing units, 74.8% were owner-occupied and 25.2% were renter-occupied. The homeowner vacancy rate was 1.2% and the rental vacancy rate was 6.3%.

=== 2000 census ===
As of the census of 2000, there were 16,582 people, 6,544 households, and 4,764 families residing in the county. The population density was 52 per square mile (20/km^{2}). There were 7,353 housing units at an average density of 23 per square mile (8.9/km^{2}). The racial makeup of the county was 98.81% White, 0.14% Black or African American, 0.24% Native American, 0.13% Asian, 0.01% Pacific Islander, 0.04% from other races, and 0.63% from two or more races. 0.62% of the population were Hispanic or Latino of any race.

There were 6,544 households, out of which 33.60% had children under the age of 18 living with them, 57.90% were married couples living together, 11.40% had a female householder with no husband present, and 27.20% were non-families. 24.40% of all households were made up of individuals, and 10.70% had someone living alone who was 65 years of age or older. The average household size was 2.49 and the average family size was 2.95.

In the county, the population was spread out, with 24.40% under the age of 18, 8.80% from 18 to 24, 30.00% from 25 to 44, 23.60% from 45 to 64, and 13.20% who were 65 years of age or older. The median age was 36 years. For every 100 females there were 97.90 males. For every 100 females age 18 and over there were 94.60 males.

The median income for a household in the county was $23,475 and the median income for a family was $30,278. Males had a median income of $26,770 versus $18,388 for females. The per capita income for the county was $12,337. About 19.10% of families and 23.10% of the population were below the poverty line, including 28.30% of those under age 18 and 21.60% of those age 65 or over.

== Politics ==
United States presidential election results for Rockcastle County, Kentucky
Year	Republican		Democratic		Third party(ies)	
Year	No.	%	No.	%	No.	%
1912	1,082	43.16%	859	34.26%	566	22.58%
1916	1,932	66.28%	968	33.21%	15	0.51%
1920	3,561	70.96%	1,438	28.66%	19	0.38%
1924	2,712	66.24%	1,277	31.19%	105	2.56%
1928	3,858	80.95%	908	19.05%	0	0.00%
1932	3,577	64.29%	1,976	35.51%	11	0.20%
1936	3,875	71.19%	1,568	28.81%	0	0.00%
1940	3,536	68.08%	1,652	31.81%	6	0.12%
1944	3,802	74.03%	1,327	25.84%	7	0.14%
1948	3,236	70.61%	1,309	28.56%	38	0.83%
1952	3,503	72.35%	1,326	27.39%	13	0.27%
1956	3,787	74.08%	1,313	25.68%	12	0.23%
1960	3,982	77.73%	1,141	22.27%	0	0.00%
1964	2,829	63.20%	1,631	36.44%	16	0.36%
1968	3,072	66.96%	868	18.92%	648	14.12%
1972	3,437	77.31%	968	21.77%	41	0.92%
1976	2,583	64.37%	1,408	35.09%	22	0.55%
1980	3,543	71.62%	1,345	27.19%	59	1.19%
1984	4,328	79.73%	1,089	20.06%	11	0.20%
1988	3,880	78.42%	1,041	21.04%	27	0.55%
1992	3,287	67.12%	1,144	23.36%	466	9.52%
1996	3,106	66.80%	1,160	24.95%	384	8.26%
2000	3,992	76.08%	1,174	22.37%	81	1.54%
2004	4,804	77.91%	1,320	21.41%	42	0.68%
2008	4,757	75.82%	1,410	22.47%	107	1.71%
2012	5,028	80.89%	1,097	17.65%	91	1.46%
2016	5,609	83.83%	915	13.68%	167	2.50%
2020	6,577	84.49%	1,134	14.57%	73	0.94%
2024	6,635	85.76%	986	12.74%	116	1.50%

Rockcastle County has been a Republican stronghold since the 1880s. It has only voted for the Democratic presidential nominee four times: in 1868, 1872, 1876, and 1880.

=== Elected officials ===
Elected officials as of January 3, 2025
U.S. House	Hal Rogers (R)	KY 5
Ky. Senate	Brandon J. Storm (R)	21
Ky. House	Josh Bray (R)	71

== Communities ==
- Brodhead
- Livingston
- Mount Vernon (county seat)

== See also ==
- National Register of Historic Places listings in Rockcastle County, Kentucky
- Rockcastle Regional Hospital and Respiratory Care Center
- Goochland Cave
- Rockcastle County School District
