= Stoner Creek Rural Historic District =

Historic district in Kentucky, United States

- U.S. National Register of Historic Places
- Location within Kentucky Location within the United States
- Nearest city: Paris, Kentucky
- Coordinates: 38°09′53″N 84°11′12″W
- Area: 22,000 acres (89 km^{2})
- Built: 1840
- Architect: Jens Jensen, others
- Architectural style: Early Republic, Mid 19th Century Revival
- NRHP reference No.: 01000449
- Added to NRHP: May 2, 2001

The Stoner Creek Rural Historic District, in Bourbon County, Kentucky near Paris, Kentucky, is a 22,000 acres (89 km^{2}) historic district which was listed on the National Register of Historic Places in 2001.

It included 526 contributing buildings, 207 contributing structures, seven contributing objects and 33 contributing sites.

It includes work by landscape architect Jens Jensen.

Non-contributing resources include 367 buildings, 52 structures, and three sites.

It includes 10 historic farms. Each farm being known for its own specific thing.

Farms larger than 1,000 acres (4.0 km^{2}) are:

- Claiborne
- Xalapa
- Highland, post-World War II
- Stonerside, post-World War II
- Norton Clay Farm
- Homer Short Farm

Ones larger than 500 acres (200 ha) include:

- Auvergne, which has an antebellum main house and core of farmstead
- Hillside
- Hidaway
- Hunterton, pre-World War II
- Golden Chance, pre-World War II
- Green Valley

It runs along Winchester, Stoney Point, Spears Mill, and N. Middletown Roads.
