= North Middletown, Kentucky =

- City
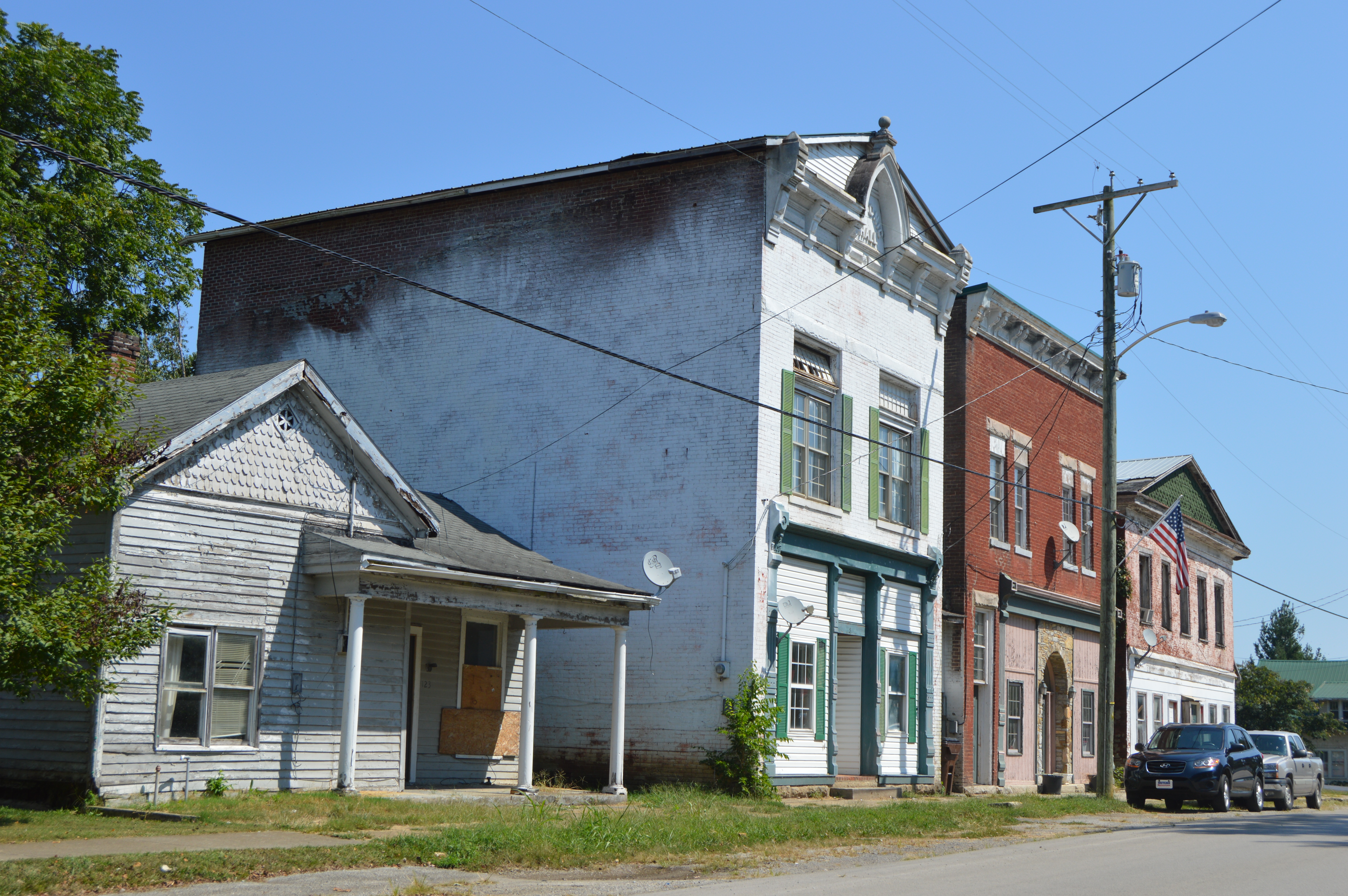
- Main Street downtown

- Location of North Middletown in Bourbon County, Kentucky.
- Coordinates: 38°08′33″N 84°06′37″W
- Country: United States
- State: Kentucky
- County: Bourbon
- Incorporated: 1819

Area
  - Total: 0.33 sq mi (0.86 km^{2})
  - Land: 0.33 sq mi (0.86 km^{2})
  - Water: 0 sq mi (0.00 km^{2})
- Elevation: 899 ft (274 m)

Population (2020)
  - Total: 610
  - Density: 1,832.1/sq mi (707.39/km^{2})
- Time zone: UTC-5 (Eastern (EST))
  - Summer (DST): UTC-4 (EDT)
- ZIP code: 40357
- Area code: 859
- FIPS code: 21-56820
- GNIS feature ID: 2404396

North Middletown is a home rule-class city in Bourbon County, Kentucky, in the United States. As of the 2020 census, North Middletown had a population of 610. North Middletown is part of the Lexington-Fayette Metropolitan Statistical Area.

== History ==
North Middletown was incorporated in 1818; the prefix "North" was intended to avoid repetition with similarly named Middletown, Kentucky. A post office called North Middletown has been in operation since 1819.

== Geography ==
North Middletown is located in southeastern Bourbon County. U.S. Route 460 (Main Street) passes through the center of town, leading northwest 10 miles (16 km) to Paris, the county seat, and 12 miles (19 km) southeast to Mount Sterling.

According to the United States Census Bureau, North Middletown has a total area of 0.33 square miles (0.86 km^{2}), all land.

== Demographics ==
Historical population
Census	Pop.	Note	%±
1830	195		—
1870	320		—
1880	377		17.8%
1890	496		31.6%
1900	484		−2.4%
1910	390		−19.4%
1920	339		−13.1%
1930	400		18.0%
1940	376		−6.0%
1950	319		−15.2%
1960	291		−8.8%
1970	433		48.8%
1980	637		47.1%
1990	602		−5.5%
2000	562		−6.6%
2010	643		14.4%
2020	610		−5.1%
U.S. Decennial Census

As of the census of 2000, there were 562 people, 217 households, and 156 families living in the city. The population density was 1,918.8 inhabitants per square mile (740.9/km^{2}). There were 234 housing units at an average density of 798.9 per square mile (308.5/km^{2}). The racial makeup of the city was 96.98% White, 1.60% African American, 0.18% from other races, and 1.25% from two or more races. Hispanic or Latino of any race were 0.71% of the population.

There were 217 households, out of which 36.9% had children under the age of 18 living with them, 51.6% were married couples living together, 13.8% had a female householder with no husband present, and 28.1% were non-families. 22.1% of all households were made up of individuals, and 12.4% had someone living alone who was 65 years of age or older. The average household size was 2.59 and the average family size was 3.00.

In the city, the population was spread out, with 26.2% under the age of 18, 8.2% from 18 to 24, 31.5% from 25 to 44, 23.3% from 45 to 64, and 10.9% who were 65 years of age or older. The median age was 36 years. For every 100 females, there were 90.5 males. For every 100 females age 18 and over, there were 86.9 males.

The median income for a household in the city was $34,038, and the median income for a family was $37,000. Males had a median income of $31,042 versus $21,750 for females. The per capita income for the city was $14,606. About 11.8% of families and 14.5% of the population were below the poverty line, including 12.1% of those under age 18 and 35.0% of those age 65 or over.
