= Renfro Valley, Kentucky =

Human settlement in Kentucky, United States of America

Renfro Valley
- Unincorporated community
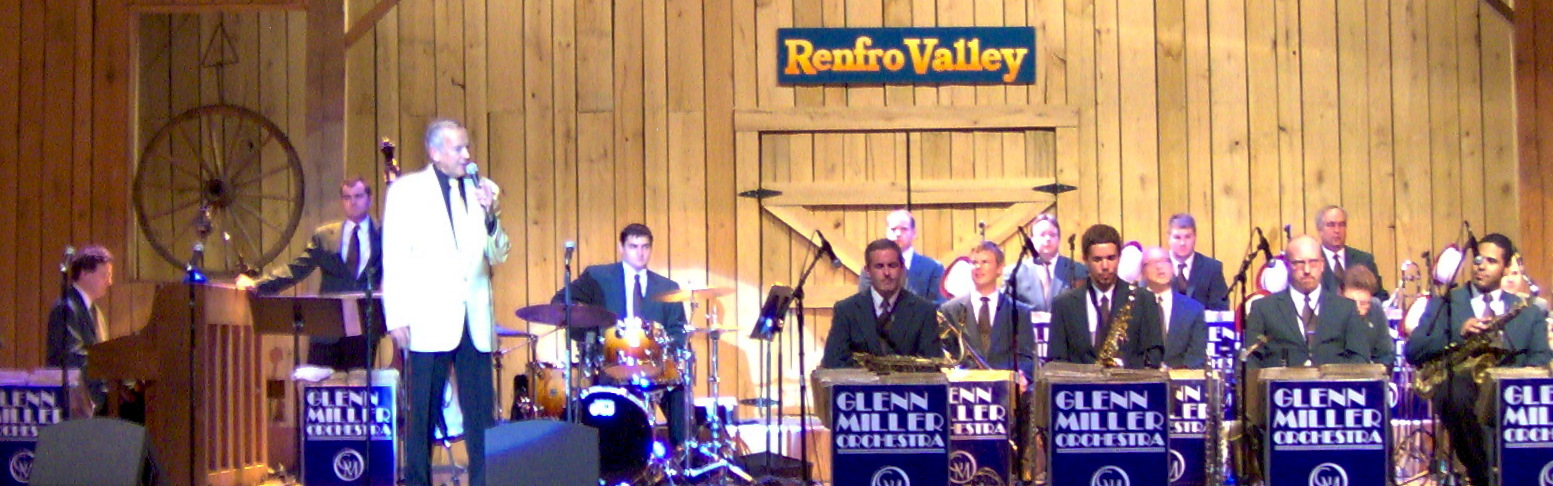
- Renfro Valley Entertainment Center hosting the Glenn Miller Orchestra in 2009.

- Location within the state of Kentucky Renfro Valley (the United States)
- Coordinates: 37°23′16″N 84°19′54″W
- Country: United States
- State: Kentucky
- County: Rockcastle
- Elevation: 951 ft (290 m)
- Time zone: UTC-5 (Eastern (EST))
  - Summer (DST): UTC-4 (EST)
- ZIP codes: 40473
- GNIS feature ID: 5514889

Renfro Valley is a neighborhood located just off Interstate 75 at the junction of U.S. Route 25 and Kentucky Route 2793 north of Mount Vernon, the county seat of Rockcastle County, Kentucky, United States. The community has its own United States Post Office, zip code 40473.

== Arts and culture ==
Renfro Valley is home to the Renfro Valley Entertainment Center. Since being founded by local area native John Lair and others in 1939, Renfro Valley Entertainment Center has hosted the Renfro Valley Barn Dance, a traditional country music show which gave entertainers such as Hank Snow, Hank Williams, Red Foley, and Homer and Jethro the spotlight early in their careers. The Barn Dance and other programming originating in Renfro Valley was broadcast over the CBS Radio Network until the late 1950s.

Today, Renfro Valley is known for its history of "Real Country Music by Real Country Folks." This tradition continues with stage shows put on by the current cast of Renfro Valley entertainers. Also, since 1992, Renfro Valley Entertainment Center has hosted Headliner Concerts that feature a mixture of country singers with newer artists, as well as bluegrass, gospel, and comedy acts.

Renfro Valley, Kentucky is also home to the Kentucky Music Hall of Fame and Museum.

== Radio ==
Renfro Valley is the home of Renfro Valley Gatherin' (also formerly known as Renfro Valley Sunday Morning Gatherin' ), which is the second oldest continually broadcast rural/country oriented radio program in the United States, having been aired every Sunday since September 1943. (Among rural/country oriented programs, only the Grand Ole Opry has been broadcast on a continual basis longer, since 1925.) After CBS Radio stopped carrying the show in the late 1950s, a pre-recorded version of the Gatherin' program went into syndication. The syndicated broadcast of the Gatherin' is still heard on scores of stations across the United States and Canada, as well as on satellite radio and Internet broadcasts. One station which broadcasts the Gatherin' is the local radio station in Mt. Vernon - Renfro Valley, Kentucky, which is WRVK 1460 AM. For many years now, WRVK has been owned and operated separately from the Entertainment Center, although it was also co-founded by John Lair in 1957. Today WRVK is owned by Saylor Broadcasting, Inc. of Mt. Vernon, Kentucky.
