= Shawhan, Kentucky =

Unincorporated community in Kentucky, United States

- Unincorporated community
- Location within Kentucky
- Coordinates: 38°18′06″N 84°16′21″W
- Country: United States
- State: Kentucky
- County: Bourbon
- Elevation: 823 ft (251 m)
- Time zone: UTC-5 (Eastern (EST))
  - Summer (DST): UTC-4 (EDT)
- Area code: 859
- GNIS feature ID: 503282

Shawhan is an unincorporated community in Bourbon County, Kentucky, United States. Shawhan is located along Kentucky Route 1893 6.4 miles (10.3 km) north of Paris.

Shawhan was a station on the Kentucky Central Railroad.
