= National Register of Historic Places listings in Nicholas County, Kentucky =

Location of Nicholas County in Kentucky

This is a list of the National Register of Historic Places listings in Nicholas County, Kentucky.

This is intended to be a complete list of the properties and districts on the National Register of Historic Places in Nicholas County, Kentucky, United States. The locations of National Register properties and districts for which the latitude and longitude coordinates are included below, may be seen in a map.

There are 12 properties and districts listed on the National Register in the county. Another property was once listed but has been removed.

This National Park Service list is complete through NPS recent listings posted March 21, 2025.

== Current listings ==
	Name on the Register	Image	Date listed	Location	City or town	Description
1	Carlisle Armory	Carlisle Armory	March 24, 2000 (#00000280)	378 Main St. 38°18′41″N 84°01′33″W	Carlisle	
2	Carlisle Historic District	Carlisle Historic District	October 26, 1989 (#89001599)	Roughly 2nd, Broadway, North, Archdeacon, Trueman, Chestnut, Walnut, Market, Elm, W. Main, and School Dr. 38°18′52″N 84°01′44″W	Carlisle	
3	Carlisle Louisville and Nashville Passenger Depot	Carlisle Louisville and Nashville Passenger Depot	May 18, 1979 (#79001028)	Market and Locust Sts. 38°18′41″N 84°01′43″W	Carlisle	
4	Dinsmore House	Dinsmore House	October 11, 1989 (#89001602)	210 S. Elm St. 38°18′41″N 84°01′56″W	Carlisle	
5	Thomas A. Dorsey Farmhouse	Thomas A. Dorsey Farmhouse	September 28, 1989 (#89001603)	416 High St. 38°18′37″N 84°01′22″W	Carlisle	
6	James Ellis Stone Tavern	James Ellis Stone Tavern	March 16, 1976 (#76000932)	U.S. Route 68; 38°23′44″N 84°01′05″W	Ellisville	
7	Forest Retreat Farm and Tavern	Forest Retreat Farm and Tavern	October 2, 1973 (#73000825)	Northwest of Carlisle at the junction of U.S. Route 68 and Kentucky Route 32; 38°20′16″N 84°03′32″W	Carlisle	Now a hotel. Stonemason and Kentucky Governor Thomas Metcalfe helped build this in 1795, later became Kentucky Governor, later retired to here and is buried here. Also buried here is Determine, 1954 Kentucky Derby winner.
8	Thomas Kennedy House	Thomas Kennedy House	September 28, 1989 (#89001601)	Eastern Ave. at E. Main St. 38°18′43″N 84°01′11″W	Carlisle	
9	William Mathers House	William Mathers House	October 12, 1989 (#89001600)	Kentucky Route 36; 38°18′43″N 84°02′36″W	Carlisle	
10	Erasmus Riggs House	Erasmus Riggs House	June 23, 1983 (#83002839)	Off Kentucky Route 13; 38°15′55″N 84°03′14″W	Carlisle	
11	Stone Barn on Brushy Creek	Stone Barn on Brushy Creek	June 23, 1983 (#83002840)	U.S. Route 68; 38°19′51″N 84°04′04″W	Carlisle	
12	John Henry Thompson House	John Henry Thompson House	June 23, 1983 (#83002841)	Off Kentucky Routes 32/36; 38°20′56″N 84°08′44″W	Millersburg	

== Former listing ==
	Name on the Register	Image	Date listed	Date removed	Location	City or town	Description
1	Henry Thompson Stone House		June 23, 1975 (#75000816)	July 10, 1980	2.5 miles north of Millersburg on Arthur Pike	Millersburg	

== See also ==
- List of National Historic Landmarks in Kentucky
- National Register of Historic Places listings in Kentucky
