= McKee-Vimont Row Houses =

- McKee—Vimont Row Houses
- U.S. National Register of Historic Places
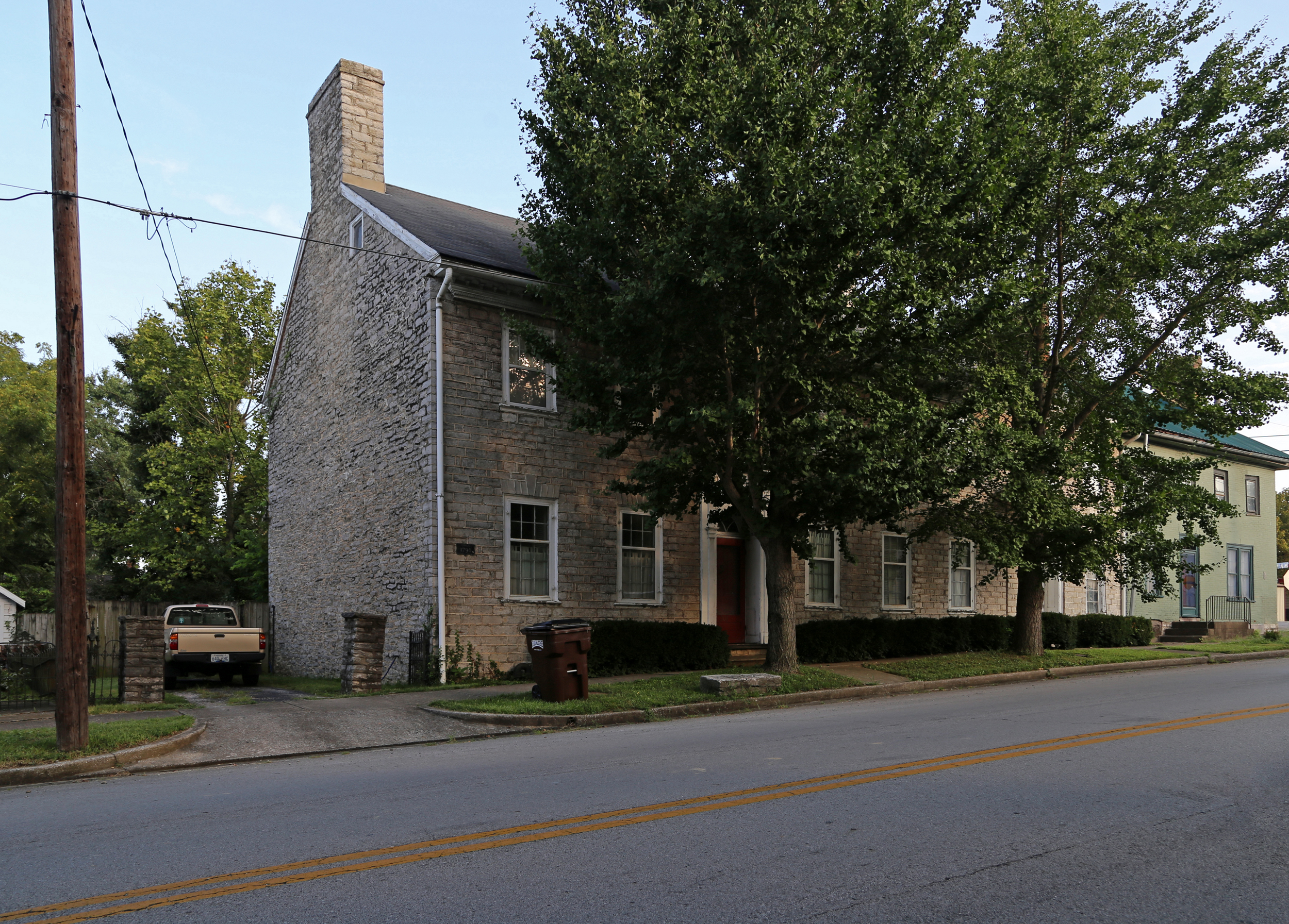

- Location within Kentucky Location within the United States
- Location: Main St., Millersburg, Kentucky
- Coordinates: 38.29911°N 84.15023°W
- Area: 1 acre (0.40 ha)
- Built: 1809
- Built by: Thomas Metcalfe
- NRHP reference No.: 75000734
- Added to NRHP: September 9, 1975

The McKee—Vimont Row Houses, on Main St. in Millersburg, Kentucky in Bourbon County, Kentucky, are three adjoining houses built in the early 1800s, with the two stone ones possibly constructed by future Kentucky governor Thomas Metcalfe. They were listed on the National Register of Historic Places in 1975.

== History ==
The three houses are, from the left when facing from the street, "Althorpe", "Old Bank Building", and "Vimont House". All were built for James McKee, who became related to the namesake of Millersburg by the 1809 marriage of Joseph Miller and Polly McKee.

=== Althorpe ===
Althorpe, also known as the James McKee House, was built of native limestone, by 1809. It is the largest house of the group. Its exterior is of finely dressed stone, and has elaborate detailing in its cornice. Its "intricately carved doorframe" is "one of only two exterior arched wooden doorframes found in Kentucky on stone houses--the semicircular fan headlight over the door are but a few of the more outstanding features of the exterior." Its interior includes "impressive" woodwork in five fireplace mantels, built-in cupboards, and other details.

=== Bank ===
The bank building, built sometime between 1809 and 1830, is also built of native limestone, and has nearly identical stone masonry work.

=== Vimont House ===
The Vimont House, on the corner of E. Third St., is built of brick, and was also built between 1809 and 1830. It was purchased by Lewis Vimont in 1830. Vimont bought the bank building two years later, and further purchased the large stone house around 1834.

=== Architecture and significance ===
The stone houses were built by Thomas Metcalfe or by his older brother John "according to local tradition" (meaning this is not confirmed by documentation).

Either way, they were deemed significant both for their architecture and for associations with historic persons:

The McKee-Vimont Houses are outstanding architectural examples as well as having important historical associations. The stone work of the south end building ("Althorpe") and what is called the bank house adjacent to it is of a high quality and similar to other Kentucky stone residences nearby ("Fairchild," no longer extant, the home of General James Garrard in Bourbon County; the Green County Courthouse, built by the later governor of Kentucky, Thomas Metcalfe; the Philip Grimes House in Fayette County). The interior and exterior wood trim is also of excellent craftsmanship. Noteworthy too is the fact that the first and second owners of the buildings, the McKees and the Vimonts, were early settlers of Millersburg and important to the commercial development of the town.

The McKees and Vimonts are further discussed in the Kentucky Historical Society's journal.

== See also ==
- List of buildings constructed by Thomas Metcalfe
