= List of buildings constructed by Thomas Metcalfe =

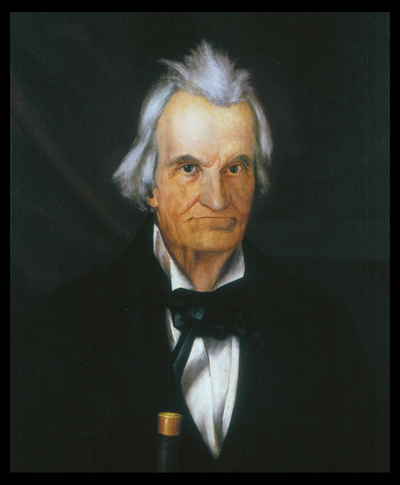
Thomas Metcalfe

The following lists the buildings constructed by Thomas Metcalfe, governor of Kentucky, including many that survive are listed on the U.S. National Register of Historic Places. Thomas Metcalfe (1780–1855) (sometimes spelled "Metcalf") was one of the most prominent stonemasons and building contractors during the settlement period of Kentucky. Among his notable constructions are the Old Courthouse in Greensburg, Kentucky, which is the oldest courthouse west of the Allegheny Mountains, and the first Kentucky Governor's Mansion.

Metcalfe later entered politics, representing the Kentucky in both houses of the United States Congress. He was also elected the state's tenth governor, inhabiting the executive mansion he helped build. Throughout his political career, he retained the nickname "Stonehammer" Metcalfe, an allusion to his earlier trade of which he remained very proud.

Locations may be seen in map displayed by following link labelled "Map of all coordinates using OpenSourceMap" on the right side of this page.

Name	Image	Built and other dates	Address	Notes
Joel Frazer House		1810 built	Off KY 982 near Cynthiana, Kentucky; 38.37045°N 84.29139°W	A three-bay stone building, one-and-a-half stories tall, located on the bank of the South Fork of the Licking River.
Ephram Harrod House			Off U.S. 460 in Bourbon County near North Middletown, Kentucky; 38.171389°N 84.123056°W	"Unsurpassed in Ky. for the historic and architectural value because of the workmanship and original condition"
James Lindsay–William Trotter House		c.1800 built	US 62, Scott County, Kentucky near Georgetown, Kentucky; 38.13750°N 84.62870°W	
McKee-Vimont Row Houses		1809 built	Main Street in Millersburg, Kentucky; 38.29911°N 84.15023°W	Two side-by-side stone houses, believed to have been built by Thomas Metcalfe or his older brother John, with finely dressed native limestone. The larger house, on the left, was built in 1809 and has "one of only two exterior arched wooden doorframes found in Kentucky on stone houses".
Thomas Metcalf House		c. 1810 built	Willie Curtis Rd. and Cedar Creek Rd., Robertson County; 38°29′49″N 84°5′38″W	Constructed by Metcalfe for his family after his marriage in 1806
Davis Newman House		1795 built	W of Spears in Spears, Kentucky	
Old Governor's Mansion		1797 built	420 High Street in Frankfort, Kentucky; 38.19940°N 84.87368°W	Kentucky's first governor's mansion; Metcalfe lived here during his gubernatorial term from 1828 to 1832
Poague House			Parker Lane near Mays Lick, Kentucky; 38.52747°N 83.81911°W	
Erasmus Riggs House		1820 built	Off KY 13 near Carlisle, Kentucky	
Jacob Spears House		1810 built	SR 1876 in Shawhan, Kentucky	
West Union Presbyterian Church		1810 built	108 South 2nd Street in West Union, Ohio; 38.79328°N 83.54376°W	Metcalfe helped build its walls.
Hubbard Williams House			Off KY 32/36 in Millersburg, Kentucky	
Old Courthouse	A two-story limestone building with two chimneys and a United States flag flying in front	1804 built	Main St., Greensburg, Kentucky; 37.26053°N 85.50163°W	Oldest courthouse west of the Allegheny Mountains.
Forest Retreat		1795 built	38.33775°N 84.05902°W	Metcalfe's estate, which he helped build in 1795, and where he lived in later life and is buried.

In addition to the structures above, some structures locally attributed to Metcalfe may have been works of his half-brother, John Metcalf III.
