= Poague House =

Historic house in Kentucky, United States

- U.S. National Register of Historic Places
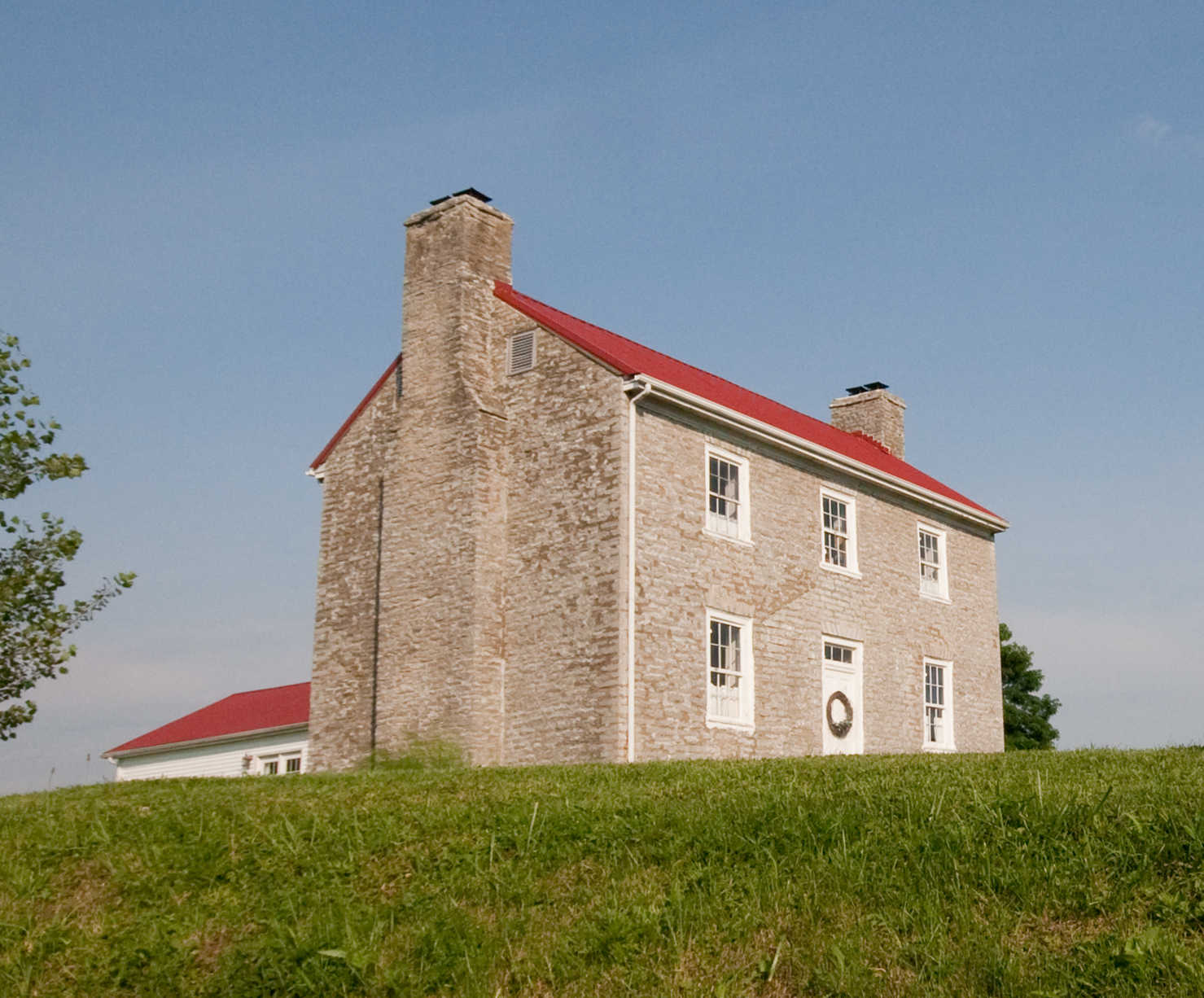

- Location within Kentucky Location within the United States
- Location: Parker Lane, Mays Lick, Kentucky
- Coordinates: 38.52747°N 83.81911°W
- Area: 31 acres (0.13 km^{2})
- Built: Early 19th Century
- Built by: Thomas Metcalfe
- Architectural style: Federal and Greek Revival architecture
- MPS: Early Stone Buildings of Kentucky Outer Bluegrass and Pennyrile TR
- NRHP reference No.: 87000210
- Added to NRHP: January 8, 1987

The Poague House is a 2 1/2-story, three-bay, hall-parlor, dry-stone house built in the first half of the 19th century by future Kentucky Governor, Thomas Metcalfe for William Poague. The ashlar stone construction is of upper Ordovician fossiliferous limestone. Window frames are pegged with ovolo trim, nosed sills, and 9-11 voussoirs with key the same height. There is a dentilled cornice.

Trim throughout the house is Federal except the hall in which a Greek Revival mantel was added. The doors are six panel with beaded diagonal battens on the inside. There is an enclosed corner stair with an atypical plaster lining.

It was listed on the National Register of Historic Places in 1987.

It is located in Mason County, Kentucky, on the southeast side of Parker Lane, above Lees Creek, about 1.5 miles (2.4 km) past Mays Lick.

== See also ==
- List of buildings constructed by Thomas Metcalfe
