= Joel Frazer House =

Historic house in Kentucky, United States

- U.S. National Register of Historic Places
- Location within Kentucky Location within the United States
- Nearest city: Cynthiana, Kentucky
- Coordinates: 38°25′6″N 84°16′20″W
- Area: 0.4 acres (0.16 ha)
- Built: 1810
- Built by: Metcalf, Thomas
- Architectural style: Federal
- MPS: Early Stone Buildings of Central Kentucky TR
- NRHP reference No.: 83002786
- Added to NRHP: June 23, 1983

The Joel Frazer House is a historic residence near Cynthiana, Kentucky, United States, that was built in 1810 by the stonemason and future Kentucky governor Thomas Metcalf. It was listed on the National Register of Historic Places in 1983. The house is on the north bank of the "Licking River" per its National Register nomination, which near Cynthiana would mean what is actually termed South Fork Licking River.

Approximately 0.4 acres (0.16 ha) around the house was designated as historic; besides the house itself, two related structures qualified as contributing properties. The house itself is a three-bay stone building, one-and-a-half stories tall, located on the bank of the Licking River.

It was listed on the National Register as part of a survey of historic stone buildings in central Kentucky.

Its location, as its Kentucky Historic Resources document merely describes, is near Cynthiana off Kentucky Route 982. (Note: Coordinates in infobox above are as given by NRIS, but are inaccurate, as they do not point to a building anywhere near the north bank of the Licking River. However the exact location may be surmised. Kentucky Route 982 coincides with New Lair Road on the south side of Cynthiana, and "New Lair Pike" is given as address of then-owner. Review of Google satellite imagery by the editor suggests it might be the house at 38.37045°N 84.29139°W. See both locations via link to "Map all coordinates using: OpenStreetMap", to the right on this page.)

== See also ==
- List of buildings constructed by Thomas Metcalfe
