= West Union Presbyterian Church =

- First Presbyterian Church of West Union
- U.S. National Register of Historic Places
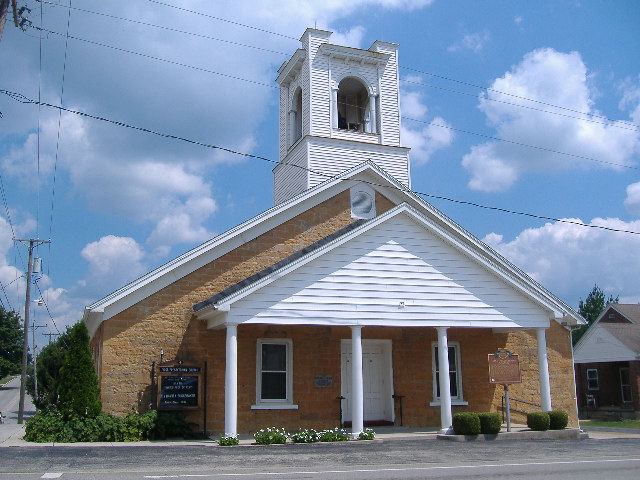
- Front of the church

- Location within Ohio Location within the United States
- Location: 108 S. 2nd St., West Union, Ohio
- Coordinates: 38.79328°N 83.54376°W
- Area: Less than 1 acre (0.40 ha)
- Built: 1810
- Architect: Thomas Metcalfe
- NRHP reference No.: 76001359
- Added to NRHP: November 18, 1976

West Union Presbyterian Church is a historic congregation of the Presbyterian Church (U.S.A.) in the village of West Union on the southern edge of Ohio. Formed at the turn of the nineteenth century, it worships in an early nineteenth-century building constructed by a future governor of Kentucky, and it counted among its earliest members a governor of Ohio. The building has been named a historic site.

== Organic history ==
In the first years after the congregation's 1800 organization, the members worshipped along Eagle Creek outside West Union, but they began working to move into West Union in 1809. From the beginning of its history, the congregation suffered from dissension and apostasy: some of the members, including their pastor John Dunlevy, defected to the Shakers in 1805, and Presbyterian minister William Williamson from nearby far northern Lewis County, Kentucky was left to lead the remaining members. These individuals feuded among themselves, many leaving to join an Associate Reformed Presbyterian congregation at Cherry Fork, which had been organized circa 1803. Nevertheless, the remnant resolved to build a new church building in the village of West Union, and under the leadership of elders Joseph Darlinton and Thomas Kirker, a subscription list was signed in 1809. The final cost of construction to the congregation was $500, of which half was paid to general contractor Thomas Metcalfe, a master mason and the future Governor of Kentucky.

As the congregation became more solidly established, it was served by a succession of ministers who used their positions to oppose slavery prominently; William Williamson and his initial successors Dyer Burgess and John Van Dyke advocated abolitionist positions, and nationally prominent abolitionist John Rankin, minister of the Presbyterian church in nearby Ripley, was welcomed as a guest preacher in 1830. Throughout this period, and continuing until his 1837 death, Thomas Kirker was among the leading lights both within the congregation and in the surrounding community: he owned the land on Eagle Creek where the congregation first worshipped, he served as an elder from 1808 until his life's end, and he held a succession of political offices — delegate to the first constitutional convention in 1802, as the Northwest Territory prepared for statehood, state representative for Adams County in 1803, state senator from 1803 until 1815, and governor of Ohio (ex officio as the Speaker of the Senate) from 1807 until 1808. His activity in the congregation, together with the responsibility of Thomas Metcalfe for the building's construction, later led the church to be nicknamed the "Church of the Governors".

Membership in 2013 was seventy-two, having fallen by more than sixty over the previous ten years, and that year's average worship attendance of twenty-nine represented a decline of more than fifty percent since 2003.

== Building ==
Built of stone, the church features a simple front gable design with the entrance at the center of the facade, under a small frame shelter. Most windows are placed on the side, under the asbestos-covered roof. A small bell tower sits atop the roof, placed near the front of the building. While the original stone building remains largely intact, a frame addition was attached to the building's rear in 1941.

In 1976, the West Union Presbyterian Church was listed on the National Register of Historic Places, qualifying because of its connection to Metcalfe. It is one of three Register-listed buildings in West Union, along with the Cockerill House and the Tet Woods Building, and one of several Metcalfe-built structures with the same designation.

== Notes ==
a: The subscription process consisted of gathering pledges to pay money toward a stated goal; in this instance, the members of the church pledged labor and materials for the construction and money to pay for additional needs.
