= Governor Letcher =

Governor Letcher may refer to:

- John Letcher (1813–1884), 34th Governor of Virginia (Disputed from 1861)
- Robert P. Letcher (1788–1861), 15th Governor of Kentucky
