= Dinsmore House =

Dinsmore House may refer to:

- Dinsmore Homestead, Burlington, Kentucky, listed on the National Register of Historic Places as Dinsmore House and as James Dinsmore House, in Boone County, Kentucky
- Dinsmore House (Carlisle, Kentucky), listed on the National Register of Historic Places in Nicholas County, Kentucky
