= Erasmus Riggs House =

Historic house in Kentucky, United States

- U.S. National Register of Historic Places
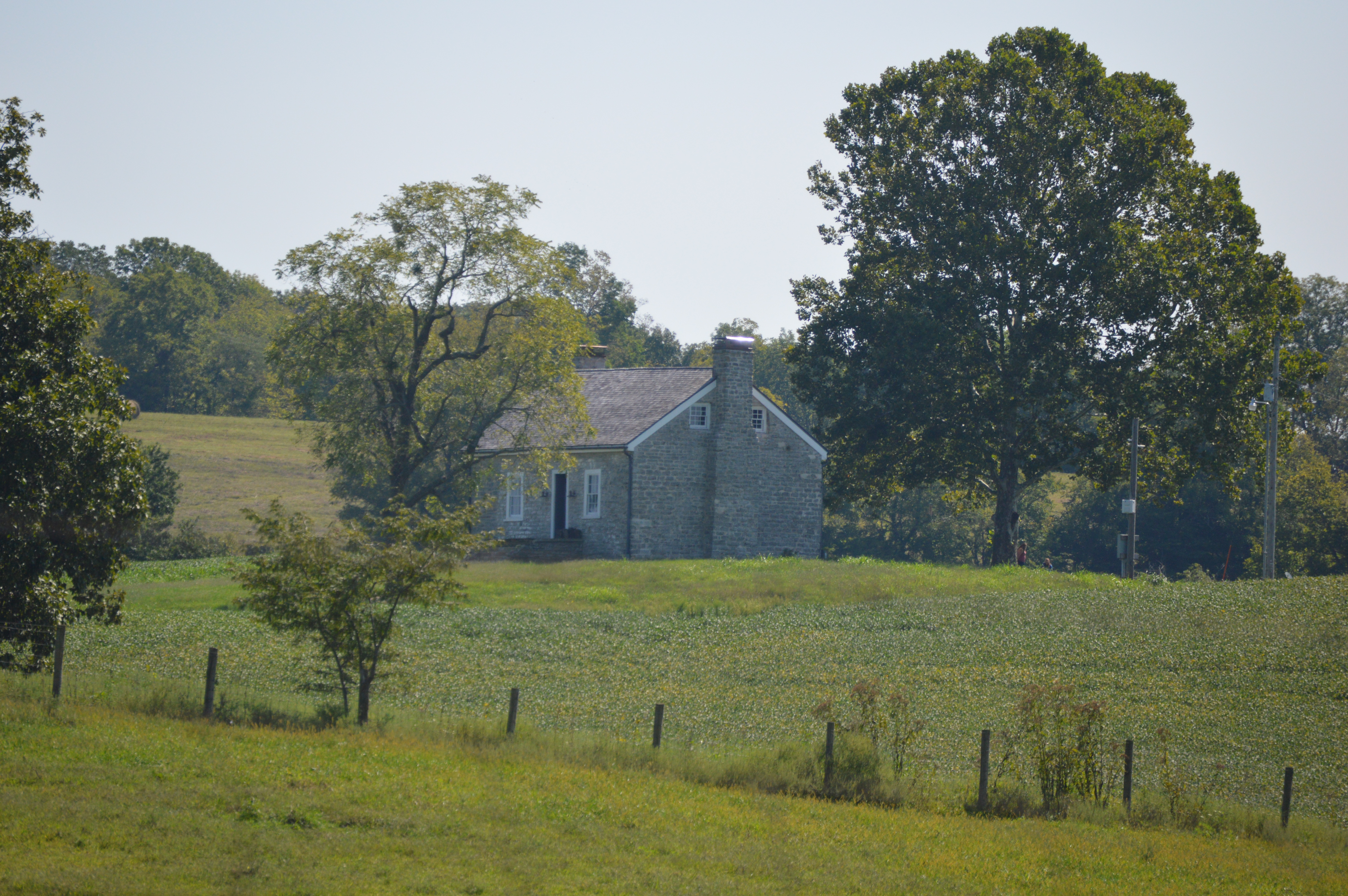

- Location within Kentucky Location within the United States
- Location: Off Kentucky Route 13, near Carlisle, Kentucky
- Coordinates: 38°15′55″N 84°03′14″W
- Area: 0.4 acres (0.16 ha)
- Built: 1820
- Built by: Metcalf, Thomas
- Architectural style: Federal
- MPS: Early Stone Buildings of Central Kentucky TR
- NRHP reference No.: 83002839
- Added to NRHP: June 23, 1983

The Erasmus Riggs House, near Carlisle, Kentucky, is a stone house built in 1820. It was listed on the National Register of Historic Places in 1983.

It is a one-and-a-half-story dry stone hall-parlor plan house. It includes elements of Federal style, and is notable especially as a work of Thomas Metcalf (stonemason and later governor of Kentucky).

== See also ==
- List of buildings constructed by Thomas Metcalfe
