= Kentucky Governor's Mansion =

Historic house in Kentucky, United States

- U.S. National Register of Historic Places
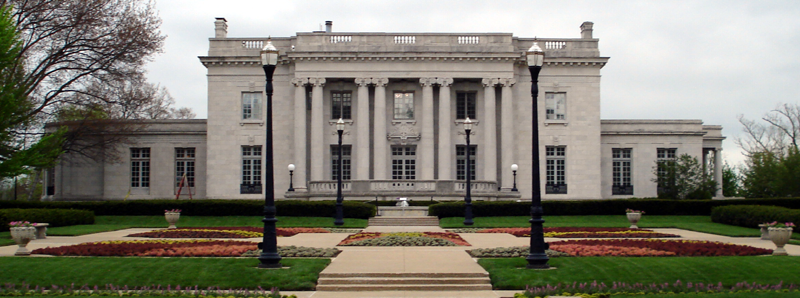
- Kentucky Governor's Mansion, 2007

- Location within Kentucky Location within the United States
- Location: E lawn of the Capitol at end of Capital Ave., Frankfort, Kentucky, U.S.
- Coordinates: 38°11′14″N 84°52′25″W
- Built: 1914
- Architect: C.C. Weber; E.A. Weber
- Architectural style: Late 19th and 20th Century Revivals, French Renaissance
- NRHP reference No.: 72000532
- Added to NRHP: February 1, 1972

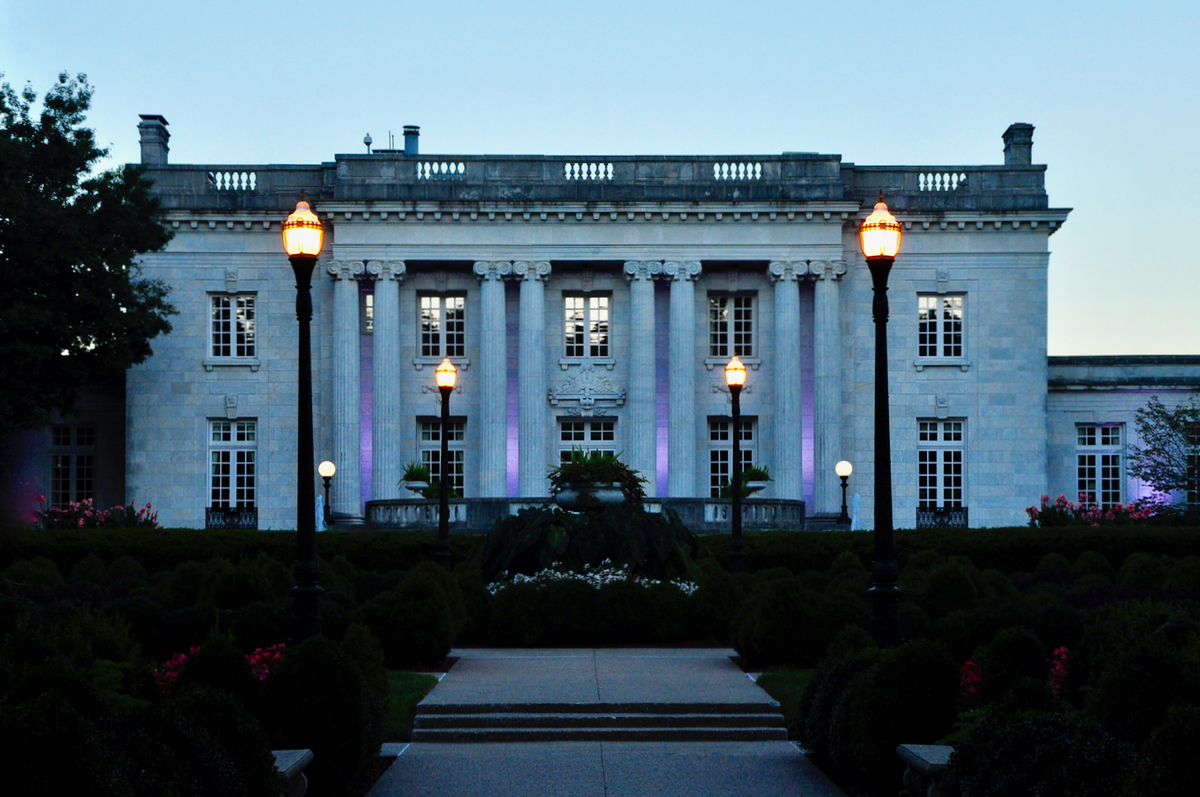
The Kentucky Governor's Mansion in 2018

The Kentucky Governor's Mansion is a historic residence in Frankfort, Kentucky and the official residence of the Governor of Kentucky. It is located on the east lawn of the Capitol, at the end of Capital Avenue. On February 1, 1972, it was added to the United States National Register of Historic Places.

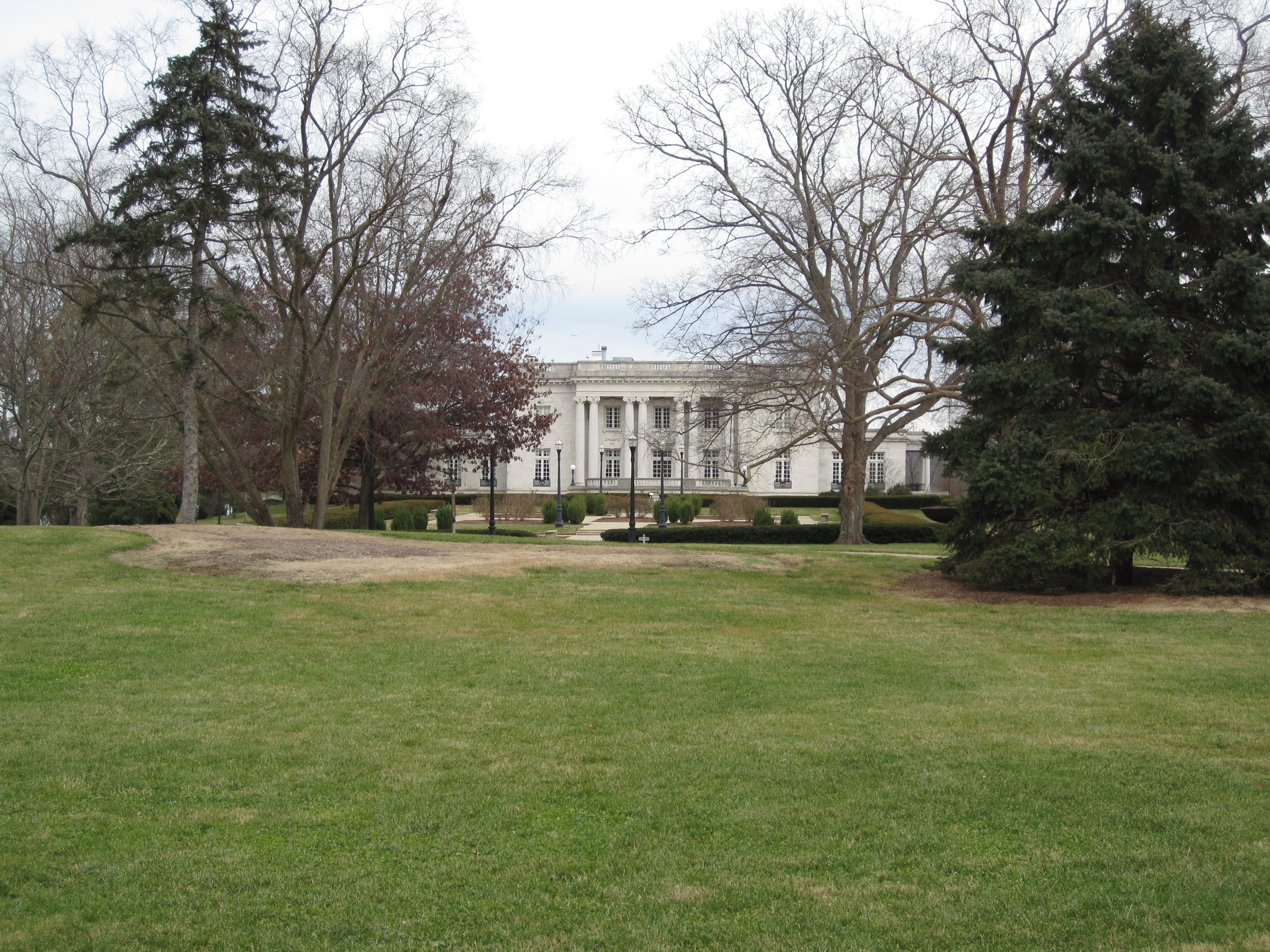
The mansion, as seen from the adjacent Capitol lawn

== Description ==
It was built in 1912–14 for use as the governor's mansion, according to designs submitted by Weber, Werner & Adkins of Cincinnati, Ohio. The politically connected Weber Brothers, Edward Addison Weber and Christian C. Weber received and handled the commission officially. However, because neither appears to have any architectural or design training, "the actual designer appears to have been John Scudder Adkins (1872-1931), a well-trained and talented St. Louis-born architect who moved to Cincinnati in 1893." Adkins designed several notable commercial and institutional buildings as well as residences throughout the mid-west. John Adkins and G.S. Werner were partners in a firm prior to merging with the Weber brothers' firm. The firm was selected from among four firms invited to submit plans.

The new mansion replaced the Old Governor's Mansion, built in 1798, which still stands, at 420 High Street, Frankfort. The Act specified that the new mansion should be "constructed, trimmed and finished with native stone produced from quarries in Kentucky." The Beaux-Arts design owed a great deal to the Petit Trianon at Versailles' interiors were in neoclassical French taste. The landscaping design for the mansion was developed and implemented by William Speed of Louisville.

In 1980, Kentucky's First Lady, Phyllis George Brown, began a fundraising effort called Save the Mansion, which was designed to fund the restoration of the interior and furnish the building. The restoration project was completed in the spring of 1983. The Governor's Mansion Preservation Foundation is a charitable trust that is charged with conservation of the historic structure. The Governor's Mansion is regularly open for tours.

== See also ==
- Old Governor's Mansion (Frankfort, Kentucky)
