= Forest Retreat =

Historic house in Kentucky, United States

- Forest Retreat Farm and Tavern
- U.S. National Register of Historic Places
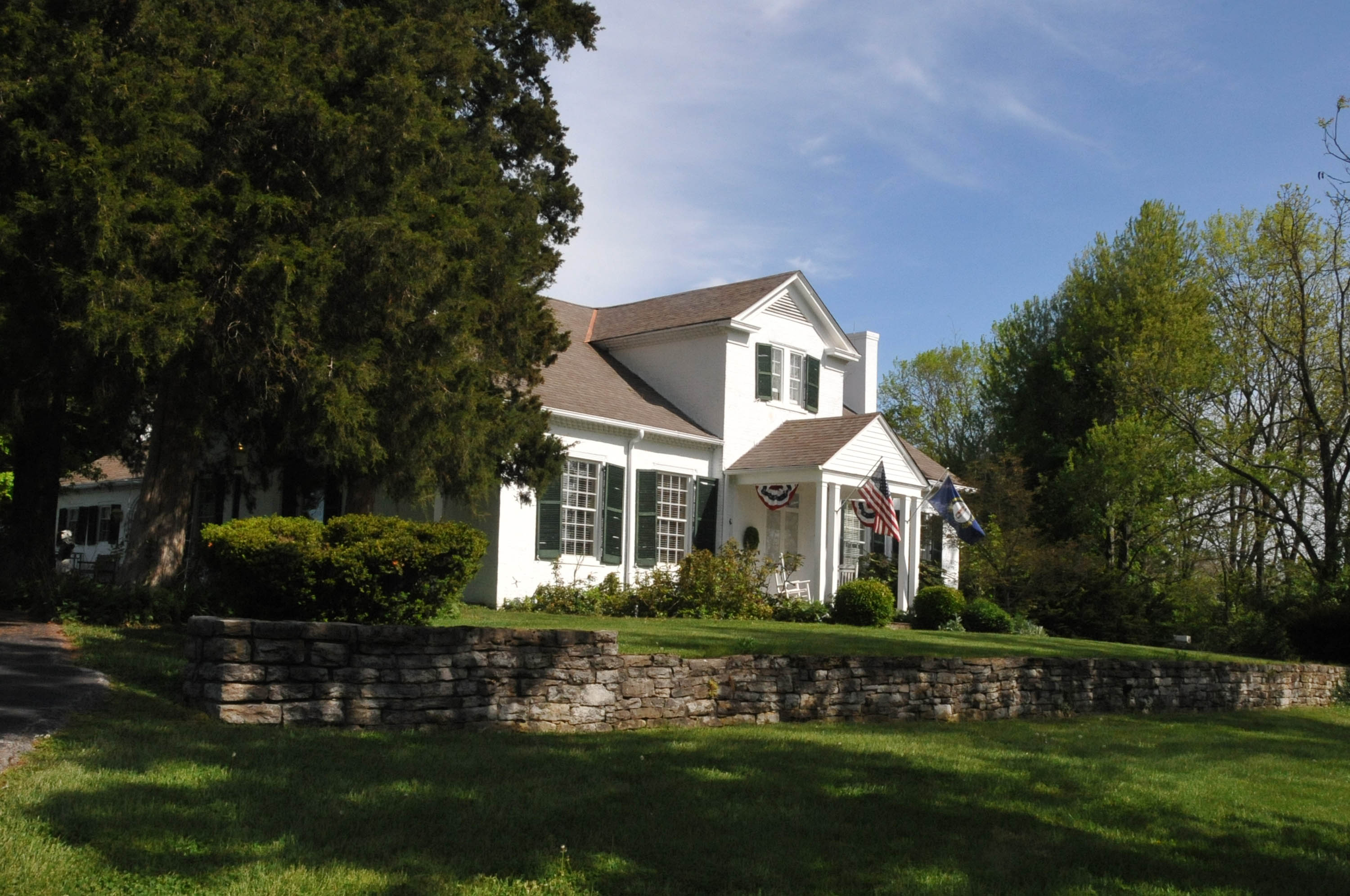
- Front of the house

- Location within Kentucky Location within the United States
- Location: Northwest of Carlisle, Kentucky at junction of US 68 and KY 32
- Coordinates: 38.33775°N 84.05902°W
- Area: 22 acres (8.9 ha)
- Built: 1795
- NRHP reference No.: 73000825
- Added to NRHP: October 2, 1973

Forest Retreat is a historic home of Kentucky governor (during 1828–1832) and United States Senator Thomas Metcalfe, located in Nicholas County, Kentucky. It is currently operated as a Bed & Breakfast hotel and event venue.

It was built in 1795. The grounds of Forest Retreat include the Metcalfe family burial plot. Interred at this plot are Thomas Metcalfe (1780–1855) and various of his relatives, and 1954 Kentucky Derby-winning horse, Determine. Thomas Metcalfe was a stonemason and later 10th Governor of Kentucky, and he contributed to the building of this house then later retired to here.

The farm deteriorated until 1933 when it was bought by Dr. Eslie Asbury. Later his son used it as a working farm and he had a horse, Determine, win the 1954 Kentucky Derby.

It was listed on the National Register of Historic Places in 1973. The 22-acre (8.9 ha) listing included three contributing buildings in addition to the farmhouse.

An earlier home of Thomas Metcalfe, the Thomas Metcalf House in Robertson County, is also listed on the National Register. It was built by Thomas in c.1810.

== See also ==
- List of buildings constructed by Thomas Metcalfe
