= Thomas Metcalfe House =

Historic house in Kentucky, United States

- Thomas Metcalf House
- U.S. National Register of Historic Places
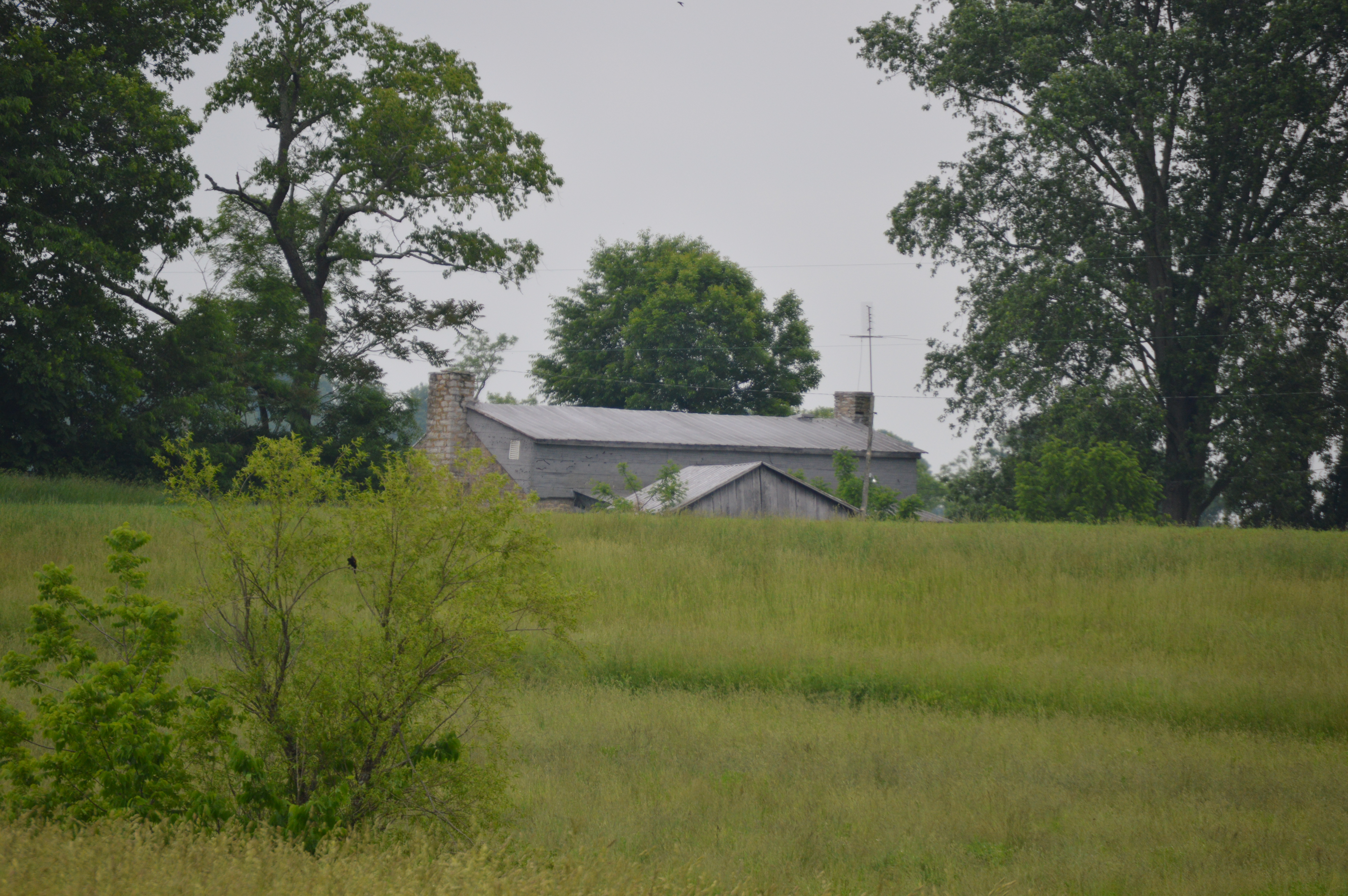
- Distant view from the roadside

- Location within Kentucky Location within the United States
- Location: Willie Curtis Rd. and Cedar Creek Rd., Robertson County, Kentucky near Mt. Olivet, Kentucky
- Coordinates: 38°29′49″N 84°5′38″W
- Area: 45 acres (18 ha)
- Built: c.1810
- Architect: Thomas Metcalfe
- Architectural style: Federal
- MPS: Early Stone Buildings of Kentucky Outer Bluegrass and Pennyrile TR
- NRHP reference No.: 87000187
- Added to NRHP: January 8, 1987

The Thomas Metcalfe House in Robertson County, Kentucky was the first house of Thomas Metcalfe (1780–1855), 10th governor of Kentucky (during 1828–1832). The house was built by Metcalfe, a stonemason and building contractor, in c.1810.

It was listed on the National Register of Historic Places in 1987 as Thomas Metcalf House, using an alternative accepted spelling of the governor's name; the listing included the stone house and a smokehouse, on a 45-acre (18 ha) property that also included a non-contributing barn.

Its location was given in the 1984 document as "6/10 mile south of U.S. 61, 1-1/2 mile east of Kentucky 617, two miles east of Kentontown, near Mt. Olivet." It appears to be the house at intersection of what are now named Willie Curtis Rd. and Cedar Creek Rd., at 38°29′49″N 84°5′38″W. This is 2.8 miles east of Kentontown by road or 4.5 miles southwest of Olivet by road.

A later home of Thomas Metcalfe, Forest Retreat in Nicholas County, is also listed on the National Register.

== See also ==
- List of buildings constructed by Thomas Metcalfe
