= Stone Barn on Brushy Creek =

- U.S. National Register of Historic Places
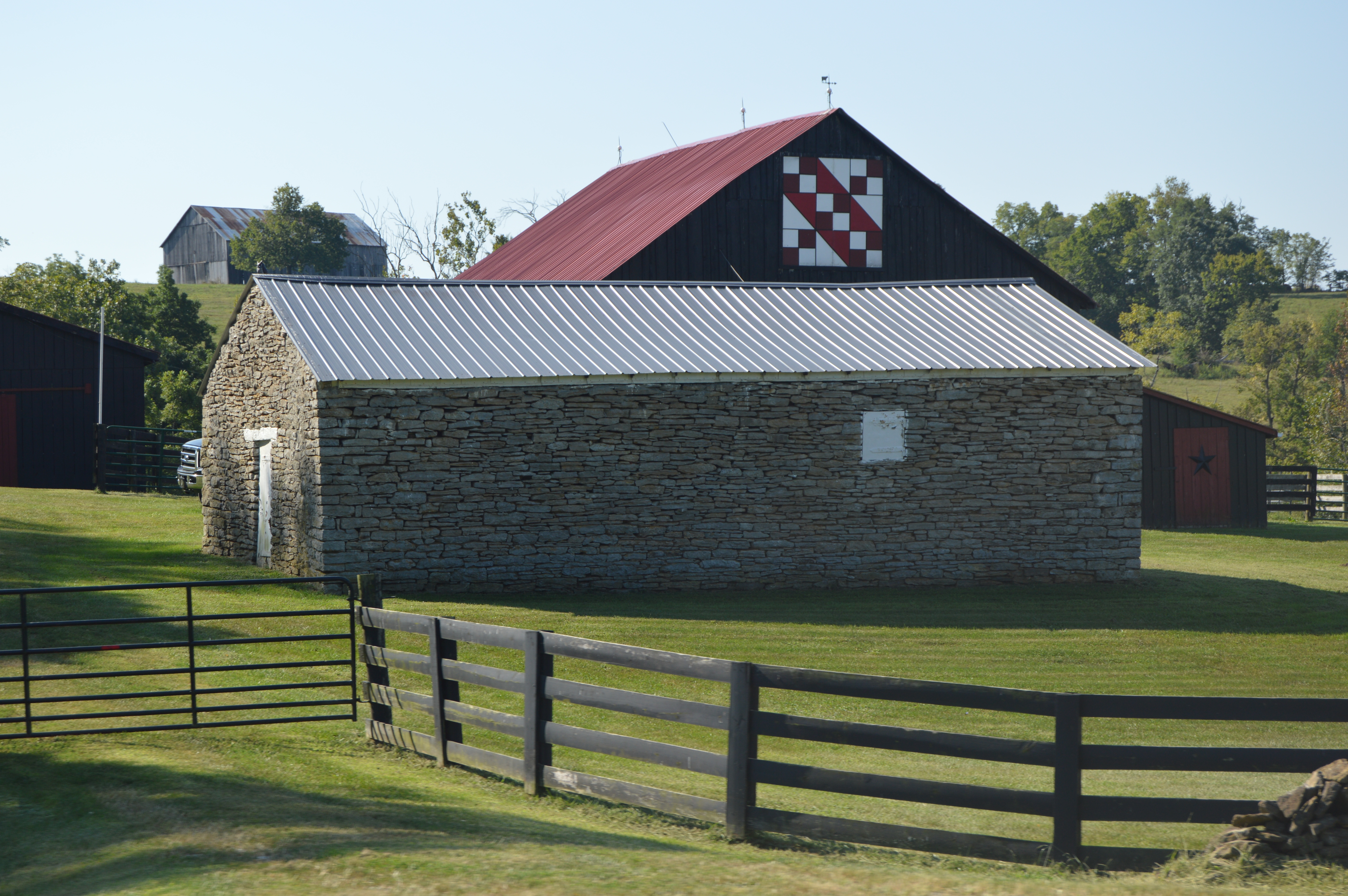
- Nearest city: Carlisle, Kentucky
- Coordinates: 38°19′51″N 84°04′04″W
- Area: less than one acre
- MPS: Early Stone Buildings of Central Kentucky TR
- NRHP reference No.: 83002840
- Added to NRHP: June 23, 1983

The Stone Barn on Brushy Creek, also known as the Ball Barn, is a historic and unusual stone barn which was listed on the National Register of Historic Places in 1983. It is located on U.S. Route 68 in Nicholas County, Kentucky near Carlisle.

It is a 23 by 40 feet (7.0 m × 12.2 m) dry stone barn.

It is a "unique stone barn with connection to slave trade".
