= Robert P. Letcher =

American governor of Kentucky

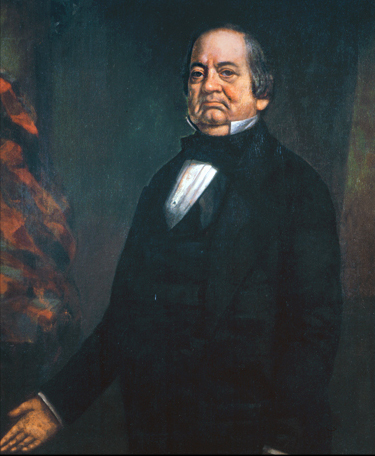

16th United States Ambassador to Mexico
- In office 1849–1852
- President: Zachary Taylor
- Preceded by: Nathan Clifford
- Succeeded by: Robert Greenhow

15th Governor of Kentucky
- In office September 2, 1840 – September 4, 1844
- Lieutenant: Manlius Valerius Thomson
- Preceded by: Charles A. Wickliffe
- Succeeded by: William Owsley

Member of the U.S. House of Representatives from Kentucky's 4th district
- In office March 4, 1823 – March 3, 1833
- Preceded by: Thomas Metcalfe
- Succeeded by: Martin Beaty

Member of the U.S. House of Representatives from Kentucky's 5th district
- In office August 6, 1834 – March 3, 1835
- Preceded by: Richard Mentor Johnson
- Succeeded by: James Harlan

Member of the Kentucky House of Representatives
- In office 1813–1815; 1817–1821

Personal details
- Born: February 10, 1788 Goochland County, Virginia, US
- Died: January 24, 1861 (aged 72) Frankfort, Kentucky, US
- Resting place: Frankfort Cemetery
- Party: Democratic Republican, National Republican Party, Whig
- Spouse(s): Mary Oden Epps; Charlotte Robertson
- Profession: Lawyer

Robert Perkins Letcher (February 10, 1788 – January 24, 1861) was an American politician and lawyer who was the 15th governor of Kentucky from 1840 to 1844. He served as a U.S. representative from Kentucky from 1823 to 1833 and from 1834 to 1835. He also served as Minister to Mexico and in the Kentucky General Assembly where he was Speaker of the House in 1837 and 1838. A strong supporter of the Whig Party, he was a friend of Henry Clay and John J. Crittenden.

Letcher's family came to Kentucky around 1800. Letcher attended the private academy of Joshua Fry, then studied law. He was briefly a judge advocate in John Allen's volunteer militia during the War of 1812. He began his political career in 1813, representing Garrard County in the Kentucky House of Representatives. In 1823, he was elected to the U.S. House of Representatives, where he served for more than a decade. During the 1824 presidential election, he acted as an intermediary between John Quincy Adams and Henry Clay. Adams' opponent, Andrew Jackson, charged that, through these negotiations, Clay agreed to support Adams for president in exchange for being named Secretary of State.

In 1840, Letcher became the Whig nominee for governor of Kentucky over William Owsley. In the general election, Letcher won by a landslide over Judge Richard French. Letcher's fiscally conservative policies helped Kentucky recover from the financial Panic of 1837. By the end of his term, the state was experiencing budget surpluses and state banks had resumed specie payments. After Letcher left office, he was appointed Minister to Mexico by President Zachary Taylor. Following this, he made an attempt to return to the U.S. House, but was defeated by Democrat John C. Breckinridge. Letcher's defeat in Henry Clay's home district was a strong indication of the decline of Whig influence in Kentucky. Though he remained active in politics, Letcher never again sought public office. He died on January 24, 1861, at the age of seventy-two.

Letcher County, Kentucky, located in the Eastern part of the state, is named after him.

== Early life ==
Robert Perkins Letcher was born in Goochland County, Virginia, on February 10, 1788. He was seventh of twelve children born to Stephen Giles and Betsy (Perkins) Letcher. The family moved to Kentucky about 1800, first living at Harrodsburg, then settling in Garrard County. For a time, Letcher attended the common schools of the area, but he was dismissed for being unruly. He studied the trade of masonry, though not very enthusiastically, at his father's brickyard.

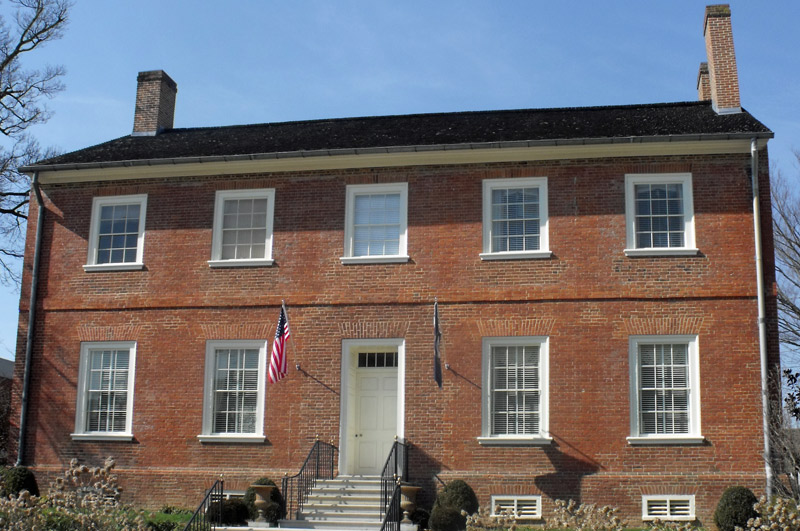
According to legend, Letcher helped build the first Kentucky governor's mansion.

Letcher enrolled in Joshua Fry's private academy near Danville, Kentucky, faring better under Fry's instruction than he had in the common schools, and gained a sound education. Following his instruction at Fry's academy, he returned to his father's brickyard, where tradition holds that he helped build the state's first governor's mansion alongside future governor Thomas Metcalfe. He then read law in the office of Humphrey Marshall, was admitted to the bar, and commenced practice in Lancaster, Kentucky. He owned slaves. He briefly served as a judge advocate in Colonel John Allen's volunteer militia during the War of 1812.

Letcher first married Susan Oden Epps. Epps died on March 9, 1816, and did not bear any children. Following the death of his first wife, Letcher married Charlotte Robertson, sister of George Robertson, a congressman and future chief justice of the Kentucky Court of Appeals. Historian Jennie Morton records that Letcher referred to his second wife as "the queen". No children were born as a result of this marriage, but the couple raised one of their nieces from childhood. Charlotte Letcher survived her husband, and died October 29, 1879.

== Political career ==
Nicknamed "Black Bob", Letcher was known as a witty and gregarious campaigner. He was also known to distract audiences at his opponents' campaign speeches by playing a fiddle. His political career began in 1813 when he was elected to represent Garrard County in the Kentucky House of Representatives. He served until 1815, and after a respite of one term, was re-elected in 1817. In 1819, he was appointed by President James Monroe to serve as a Judge of the Superior Court of the Arkansas Territory, but he declined the appointment.

=== In the House of Representatives ===
Letcher was elected as a Democratic Republican to the Eighteenth Congress in 1823. He represented the state's fourth district until 1833, when the General Assembly conducted a redistricting of the state. After the redistricting, Garrard County became part of the fifth district.

Letcher was a friend and ardent supporter of Henry Clay. When no candidate gained an absolute majority of the electoral vote in the 1824 presidential election, the outcome fell to a vote of the House of Representatives. In the political wrangling that followed, Letcher served as an intermediary between Clay and John Quincy Adams. Eventually, Clay's supporters threw their support behind Adams, reportedly in exchange for Clay's being named Secretary of State. Andrew Jackson called the alleged deal the "corrupt bargain".

Letcher supported Adams' administration, but became anti-administration when Jackson won the 1828 presidential contest. Consistent with his support of Clay, he promoted expansion of internal improvements, including the Maysville Road bill vetoed by Jackson. In 1833, Clay proposed a compromise in the Senate to quell the Nullification Crisis; Letcher introduced Clay's compromise in the House.

In the 1833 election, Thomas P. Moore challenged Letcher for the fifth district's seat in the House of Representatives. Moore had previously represented the counties in the fifth district (Garrard excepted), and had just returned from a four-year stint as U.S. minister to Grenada. The vote was so close that the House refused to seat either candidate and ordered a new election. Letcher won the new election by 258 votes. During this term, he served on the Committee on Foreign Affairs. He did not seek re-election at the end of his term.

In 1836, Letcher served as a presidential elector on the Whig ticket. He returned to the Kentucky House later that year, and was re-elected every year until 1838. Each of these years, he sought to become Speaker of the House. In 1836, he was defeated by incumbent speaker John L. Helm by a vote of 45–48. The following year, there was a three-way contest for speaker between Letcher, Helm, and James Turner Morehead. After nine ballots, Helm withdrew from the race, and Letcher defeated Morehead 50–48. The next year, Letcher was re-elected to the post without opposition.

=== As governor of Kentucky ===
The Whigs' state nominating convention was held in Harrodsburg on August 26, 1839. Four candidates were initially put forward for the office of governor, but two withdrew from consideration, leaving the contest between Letcher and Judge William Owsley. Letcher won the nomination by a vote of 48–26. In the general election, Letcher defeated his Democratic opponent, Judge Richard French, by a majority of over 15,000 votes (out of 95,020 cast). The Whigs also captured large majorities in both houses of the state legislature.

Just weeks after Letcher's inauguration, William Henry Harrison prevailed in the 1840 presidential election. Soon after, Harrison visited Letcher in Frankfort to discuss the appointment of Letcher's friend John J. Crittenden to Harrison's cabinet. On December 14, 1840, Letcher wrote Crittenden to tell him that the General Assembly would shortly re-elect him to his Senate seat. If he (Crittenden) were going to accept a position in President Harrison's cabinet, Letcher would prefer he do it before March 4, 1841, so the General Assembly would still be in session to elect Crittenden's replacement in the Senate. On January 11, 1841, Crittenden replied that he expected to be named attorney general and believed he could accept the post before Letcher's preferred deadline. However, due to Harrison's death only a month after his inauguration, Crittenden was not able to keep Letcher's timeline; he was appointed attorney general by John Tyler on March 5, 1841.

For the first half of Letcher's term, the state was still struggling to recover from the financial Panic of 1837. Consistent with his Whig views, Letcher blamed the crisis on the federal government's failure to recharter the Second Bank of the United States. To ameliorate the state's dire financial situation, Letcher drastically cut spending, including the suspension of turnpike construction and improvements on the Green, Kentucky, and Licking rivers. These actions greatly reduced the state's deficit and improved its credit. In each of Letcher's years in office, the state showed a small but growing budget surplus.

Although Letcher generally opposed debt relief measures, he did allow the passage of some minor legislation to aid those most in danger of foreclosure on their property. In 1842, legislation was passed that expanded the types of personal property that were exempted from foreclosure. The next year, the General Assembly eliminated the summer terms of the circuit courts, effectively delaying some foreclosure hearings. Letcher also encouraged banks to make new small loans, and the legislature followed suit by moderately increasing the credit extended by state banks. As the state's economy recovered, its banks resumed specie payments. State bonds increased in value. By the end of Letcher's term, Kentucky had weathered the worst of the economic crisis.

In one of his final acts as governor, Letcher proclaimed the first thanksgiving day in Kentucky on September 26, 1844. After leaving office, he resumed his law practice in Frankfort. In 1847, he was one of four contenders for a seat in the U.S. Senate. The other contenders consisted of two fellow Whigs and a Democrat. After twenty-eight ballots, no winner emerged, and Letcher's supporters withdrew his name and nominated Joseph R. Underwood, who eventually won the seat.

=== As a diplomat to Mexico ===
Letcher was a strong supporter of Whig candidate Zachary Taylor in the 1848 presidential election. When Taylor won the election, Letcher's friend John J. Crittenden recommended Letcher for the post of postmaster general; Taylor declined this suggestion, but instead appointed Letcher as the United States envoy and minister to Mexico. Letcher arrived in Mexico City on February 3, 1850.

Letcher's primary responsibility was negotiating a treaty to protect the interests of some American citizens who had purchased the rights to construct a line of transit on the Isthmus of Tehuantepec. He submitted a rough draft of the treaty to Mexican officials in March 1850. After nearly three months of negotiation, Letcher signed a modified treaty on June 22, 1850. Among the modifications were a provision that tolls on Mexican-produced goods transported on the route would be twenty-percent less than those of United States goods and an increase in the authority exercised by Mexico in protecting the route. Letcher wrote to Secretary of State John M. Clayton that the treaty fell short of what he had hoped for, but that he believed that its provisions were the best that could be obtained.

A month after Letcher signed the treaty, Clayton was replaced as Secretary of State by Daniel Webster. In response to concerns raised by one of the Americans hoping to construct the line of transit, Webster asked that Letcher attempt to obtain certain modifications to the treaty. Letcher brought these modifications to the Mexican diplomats, but they steadfastly refused to accept them. Letcher, speaking with the blessing of the administration, intimated that the United States would take the region by force if the requested concessions were not made. The Mexican government conceded that they would not be able to resist such action, but still refused to accept the modifications to the treaty.

Upon learning of the strong Mexican resistance to his proposed modifications, Webster instructed Letcher to negotiate the most favorable terms to which the Mexicans would agree. On January 25, 1851, Letcher signed a second treaty that was slightly more favorable to the Americans. During the time it had taken both sides to negotiate the treaty, however, public sentiment in Mexico had turned decidedly against any form of treaty with the United States regarding Tehuantepec. On May 22, 1851, the Mexican government declared the agreement with the American investors null on grounds that the provisional government which granted it did not have the right to do so. Letcher attempted to negotiate a new treaty to re-acquire the rights nullified by the Mexican government, but by February 14, 1852, he reported that he did not expect to be able to reach any kind of agreement. He returned home in August 1852.

=== Later political career ===
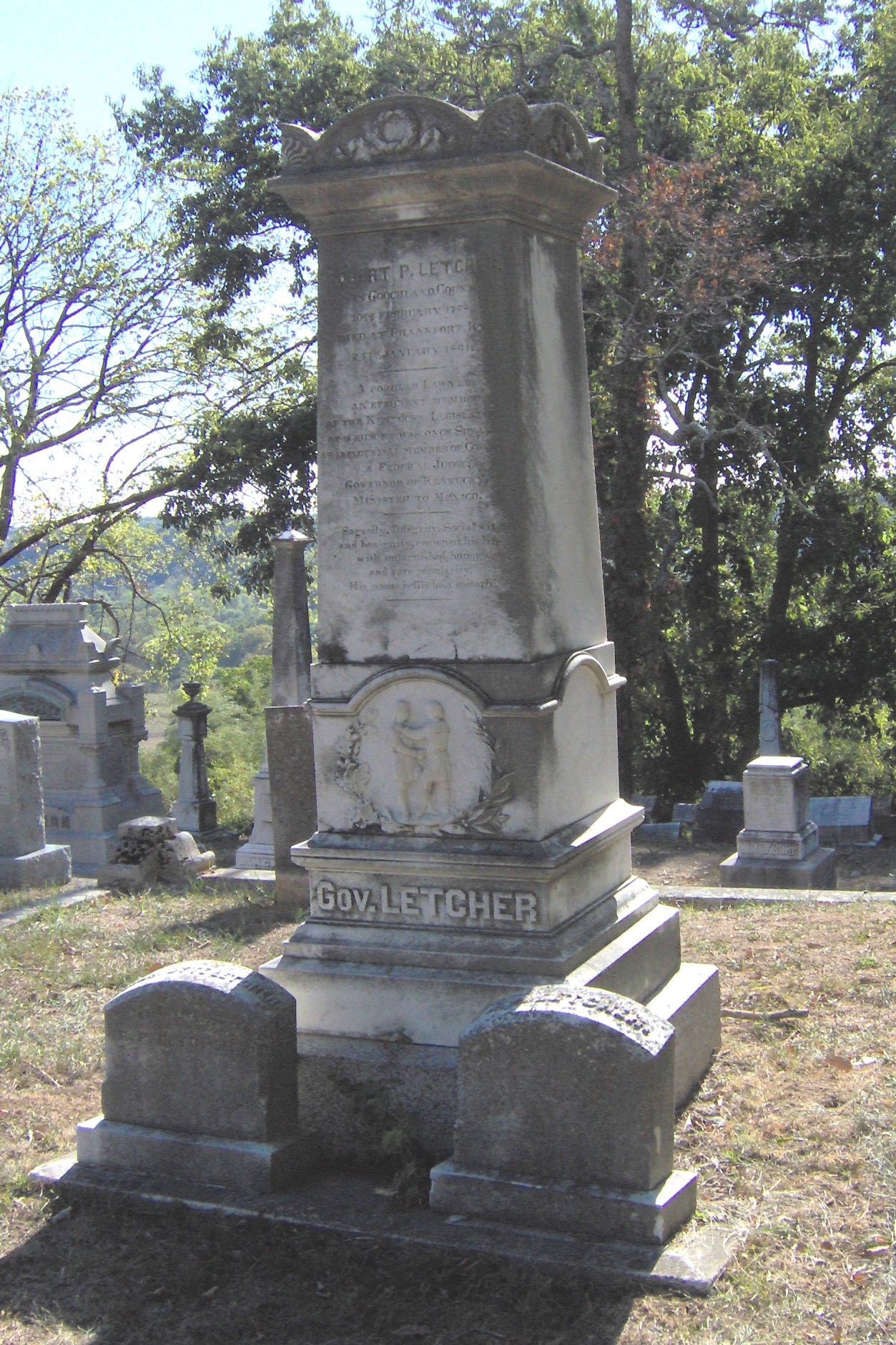
Gravestone of Letcher in Frankfort Cemetery

On returning to Kentucky, Letcher resumed his legal practice. While he was away in Mexico, Kentucky's 8th congressional district was won by Democrat John C. Breckinridge. Known as the "Ashland district" because it contained Henry Clay's Ashland estate and much of the territory he once represented, it was a Whig bastion that hadn't been represented by a Democrat since 1828. Whigs were eager to avenge the loss in 1853, and Letcher wanted to be their candidate, but the state convention chose Kentucky Attorney General James Harlan. The nomination was not well-received among some Whig factions; Harlan withdrew in March 1853, and Letcher was chosen to replace him.

Letcher first met Breckinridge in debate at Nicholasville on April 18, 1853. As the incumbent, Breckinridge spoke first and focused on political issues like contrasting the higher revenue generated by the Democratic Walker tariff with that produced by the higher Tariff of 1842 favored by the Whigs. Letcher, as he did for much of the campaign, responded by appealing to party loyalty; Breckinridge would misrepresent the district, he claimed, "because he is a Democrat". While Breckinridge was typically well composed in debate, Letcher would often become angry. On one occasion, Letcher so frequently attempted to interrupt Breckinridge that John J. Crittenden grabbed him by the coat tails to restrain him. Breckinridge supporters derisively nicknamed Letcher "Coat Tails" for the remainder of the campaign.

When Letcher's factional enemy, abolitionist Cassius Marcellus Clay, endorsed Breckinridge, Letcher charged that this, combined with the anti-slavery views of Breckinridge's uncle, Reverend Robert Jefferson Breckinridge, showed that Breckinridge was secretly an abolitionist, despite his consistent denial that Congress had the power to interfere with slavery. Breckinridge responded by citing an 1848 campaign speech Letcher had made in Indiana on behalf of Zachary Taylor. In that speech, Letcher predicted that the constitutional convention then underway in Kentucky would establish provisions for gradual emancipation, noting "It is only the ultra men in the extreme South who desire the extension of slavery."

Both candidates received financial support from outside the district, some of which was used to buy votes or bribe voters to stay home. Breckinridge received several thousand dollars, with a substantial amount coming from Washington, D.C., banker William Wilson Corcoran; estimates of Letcher's support ranged from $30,000 to $100,000. Breckinridge won the canvass by 526 votes and received 71% of the vote in Owen County, which recorded 123 more votes than registered voters.

Letcher was considered the strongest Whig candidate in the state, and his failure to win the seat was a harbinger of the ultimate demise of the Whig Party in Kentucky. His loss to Breckinridge would be his last run for public office, though he remained active in politics until his death. During the 1856 presidential election, Letcher spoke on behalf of Millard Fillmore in Pennsylvania, New York, and Kentucky. In 1857 and 1858, he urged John J. Crittenden to oppose the Lecompton Constitution for Kansas.

After the dissolution of the Whig Party, Letcher generally supported "American Party" ("Know-Nothing") candidates in state politics. Letcher and Crittenden both supported Constitutional Union candidate John Bell in the 1860 presidential election, believing he represented the best hope of peacefully resolving the tension between the north and south. By election day, his health was beginning to fail. He died at his home in Frankfort on January 24, 1861, aged 72, and was buried in Frankfort Cemetery. Letcher County, Kentucky, is named in his honor.

Party political offices
Preceded by James Clark	Whig nominee for Governor of Kentucky; 1840	Succeeded by William Owsley
U.S. House of Representatives
Preceded by Thomas Metcalfe	Member of the U.S. House of Representatives from Kentucky's 4th congressional district March 3, 1823 – March 3, 1833	Succeeded by Martin Beaty
Preceded by Richard M. Johnson	Member of the U.S. House of Representatives from Kentucky's 5th congressional district August 6, 1834 – March 3, 1835	Succeeded by James Harlan
Political offices
Preceded by Charles A. Wickliffe	Governor of Kentucky; September 2, 1840 – September 4, 1844	Succeeded by William Owsley
