= Old Governor's Mansion (Frankfort, Kentucky) =

Historic house in Kentucky, United States

- U.S. National Register of Historic Places
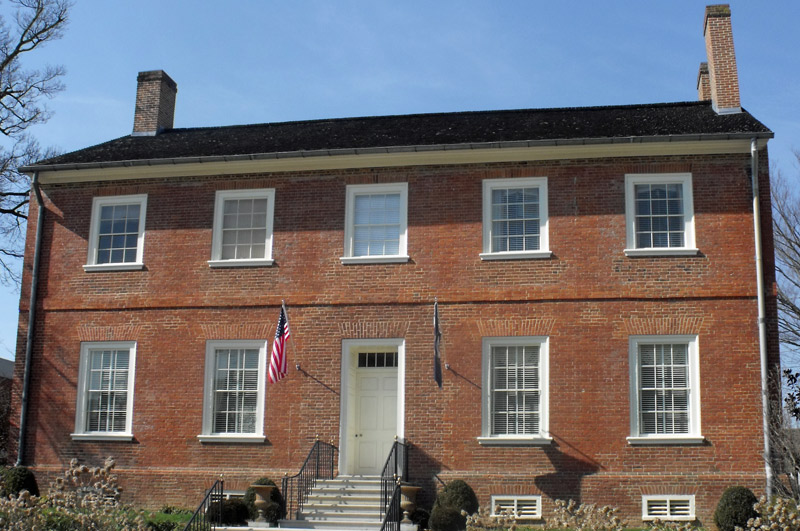

- Location within Kentucky Location within the United States
- Location: 420 High St., Frankfort, Kentucky
- Coordinates: 38.19940°N 84.87368°W
- Area: Less than one acre
- Built: 1797
- Architect: Robert P. Letcher; Thomas Metcalf
- Architectural style: Georgian
- NRHP reference No.: 71000345
- Added to NRHP: March 11, 1971

The Old Governor's Mansion, also known as Lieutenant Governor's Mansion, is located at 420 High Street, Frankfort, Kentucky. It is reputed to be the oldest official executive residence officially still in use in the Contiguous United States, as the mansion is the official residence of the lieutenant governor of Kentucky.

In 1796, the Kentucky General Assembly appropriated funds to provide a house to accommodate the governor. Construction was completed in 1798. The home barely survived fires and neglect through the years. It has undergone several style changes as evidenced by some Victorian design elements that were added.

The Mansion was often referred to as the "Palace" in its early days. Dignitaries including Theodore Roosevelt, Andrew Jackson, Louis-Philippe of France, Henry Clay, William Jennings Bryan, and the Marquis de Lafayette have been guests of the Mansion. The last occupants of the mansion were Lieutenant Governor Steve Henry and his wife Heather French Henry. Since Henry, lieutenant governors chose not to live in the mansion but to maintain residences in their hometowns and travel to Frankfort as needed. Because of this, the mansion was turned over to the Kentucky Historical Society.

Both a bricklayer and stonemason who helped build the house, Robert P. Letcher and Thomas Metcalf, later became governors and lived there.

It was listed on the National Register of Historic Places in 1971.

== See also ==
- State House (Pennsylvania): former official residence of the Lt. Governor of Pennsylvania
- Hawkins-Hartness House: official office of the Lt. Governor of North Carolina
- List of buildings constructed by Thomas Metcalfe
- National Register of Historic Places listings in Franklin County, Kentucky
