= Governor of Kentucky =

Head of government of the U.S. state of Kentucky

Governor of the Commonwealth of Kentucky
- Commonwealth seal

- Flag of the Commonwealth of Kentucky

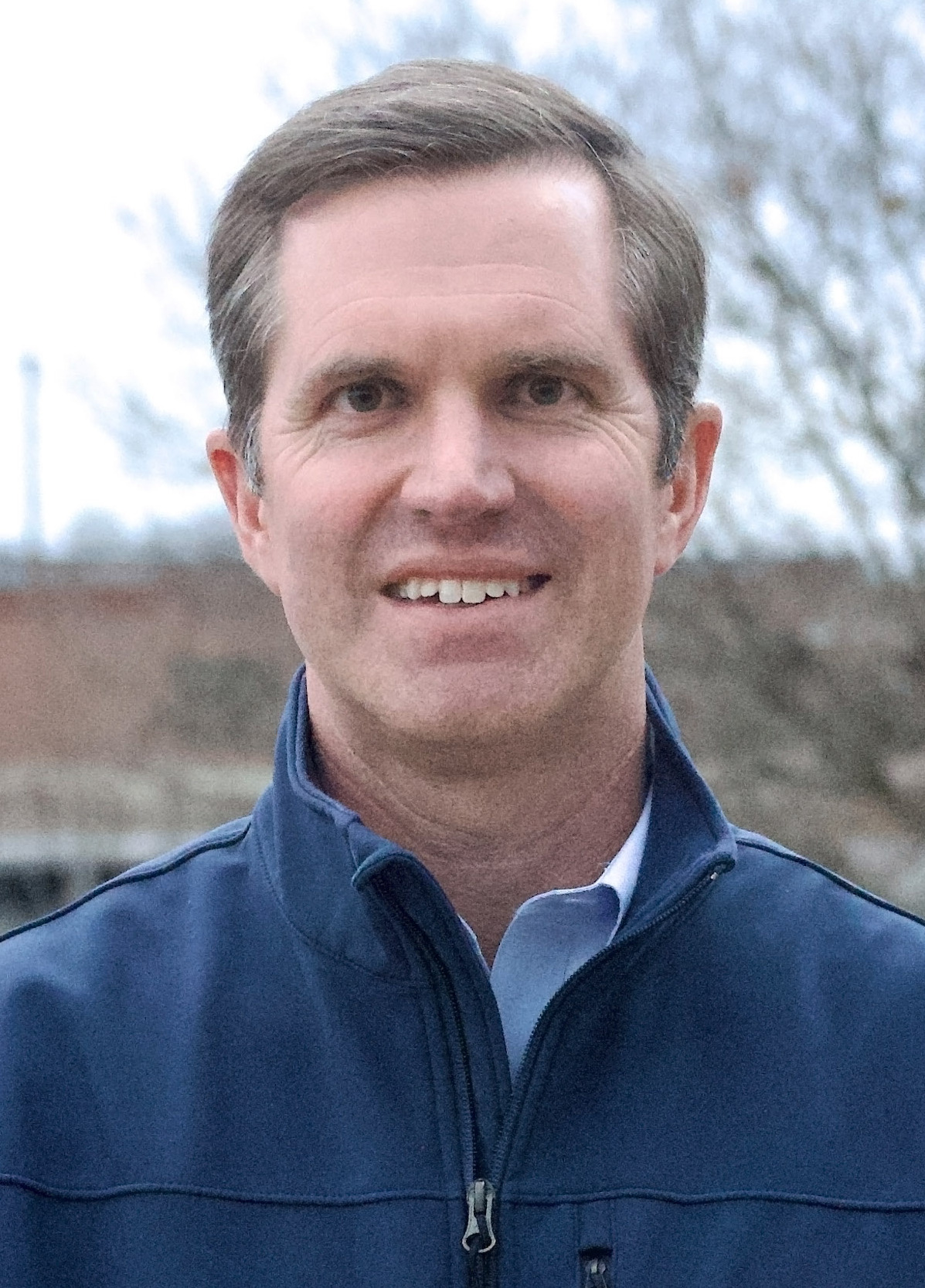
- Incumbent; Andy Beshear since December 10, 2019
- Government of Kentucky
- Style: Governor (informal); The Honorable (formal); His Excellency (diplomatic)
- Type: Head of state Head of government
- Member of: Kentucky Executive Branch; Kentucky Cabinet
- Residence: Kentucky Governor's Mansion
- Appointer: Popular vote; Line of succession
- Term length: Four years, renewable once consecutively
- Constituting instrument: Constitution of Kentucky
- Inaugural holder: Isaac Shelby
- Formation: June 4, 1792
- Succession: Line of succession
- Deputy: Lieutenant Governor of Kentucky
- Salary: $164,355 (2023)
- Website: governor.ky.gov

The governor of the Commonwealth of Kentucky is the head of government of the Commonwealth of Kentucky. Sixty-two men and one woman have served as governor of Kentucky. The governor's term is four years in length; since 1992, incumbents have been able to seek re-election once before becoming ineligible for four years. Throughout the state's history, four men have served two non-consecutive terms as governor, and four others have served two consecutive terms, the most recent being current governor Andy Beshear, who was re-elected to a second term on November 7, 2023. Kentucky is one of only five U.S. states that hold gubernatorial elections in odd-numbered years.

The governor's powers are enumerated in the state constitution. There have been four constitutions of Kentucky—adopted in 1792, 1799, 1850, and 1891, respectively—and each has enlarged the governor's authority. Among the powers assigned to the governor in the constitution are the ability to grant pardons, veto legislation, and call the legislature into session. The governor serves as commander-in-chief of the state's military forces and is empowered to enforce all laws of the state. The officeholder is given broad statutory authority to make appointments to the various cabinets and departments of the executive branch, limited somewhat by the adoption of a merit system for state employees in 1960. Because Kentucky's governor controls so many appointments to commissions, the office has been historically considered one of the most powerful state executive positions in the United States. Additionally, the governor's influence has been augmented by wide discretion in awarding state contracts and significant influence over the legislature, although the latter has been waning since the mid-1970s.

The history of the office of governor is largely one of long periods of domination by a single party, though different parties were predominant in different eras. Federalists were rare among Kentuckians during the period of the First Party System, and Democratic Republicans won every gubernatorial election in the state until 1828. The Second Party System began when the Democratic-Republicans split into Jacksonian Democrats (the predecessor of the modern Democratic Party) and National Republicans (later to become Whigs). Beginning with the election of Thomas Metcalfe in 1828, the Whigs dominated the governorship until 1851, with John Breathitt being the only Democrat elected during that period. With a Cook Partisan Voting Index of R+15, Kentucky is the most Republican-leaning state in the nation with a Democratic governor.

With the collapse of the Whig Party in the 1850s, Democrats took control of the governorship for the duration of the Third Party System, with Charles S. Morehead of the Know Nothing Party being the only exception. The election of Republican William O'Connell Bradley in 1895 began the only period of true two-party competition for the governorship; from Bradley's election through 1931, five Republicans and six Democrats held the office of governor of Kentucky. Since 1931, only four Republicans have served as governor of Kentucky, and no Republican governor has ever been re-elected; the most recent past governor, Matt Bevin, lost re-election.

== Powers and responsibilities ==
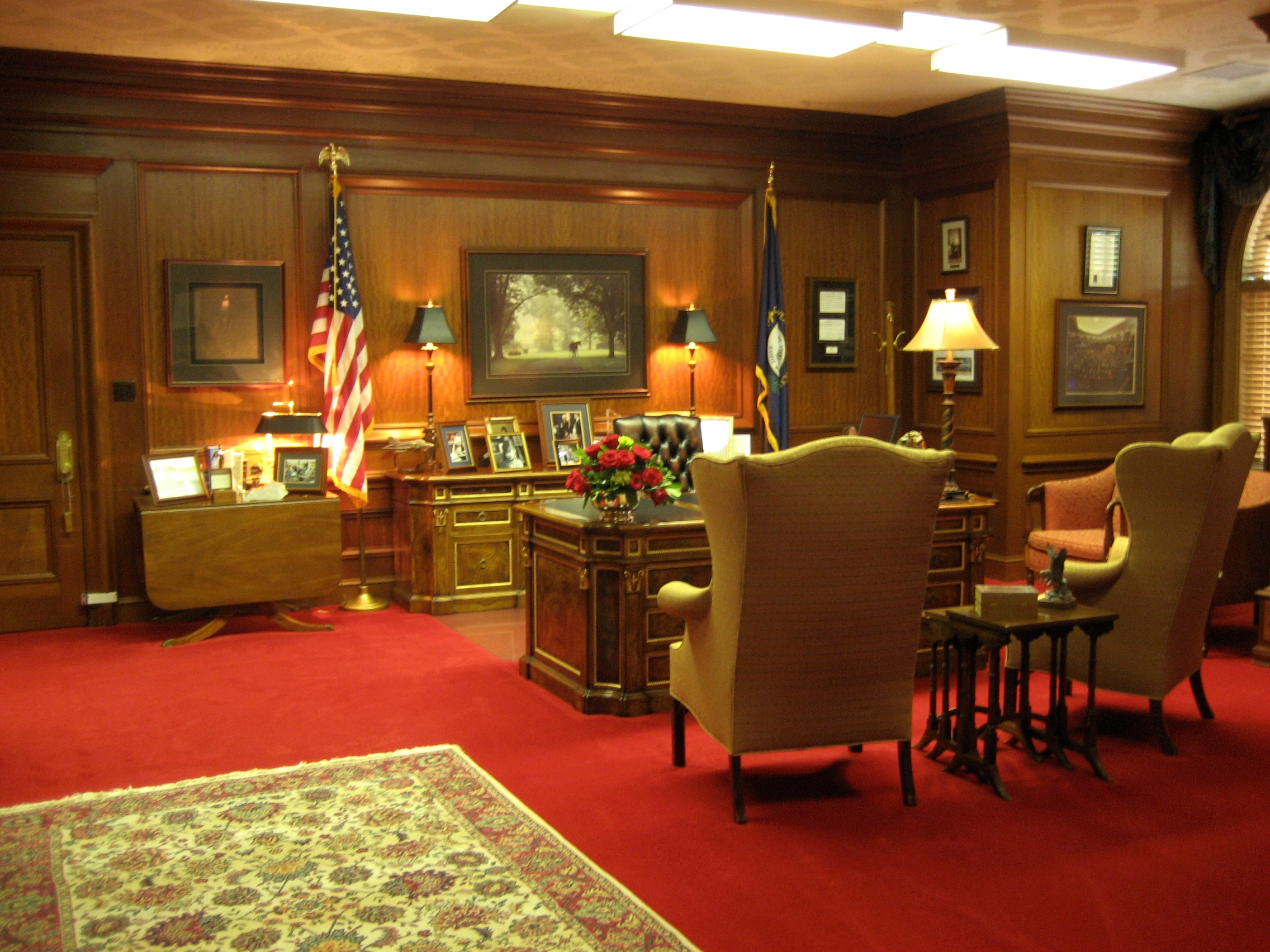
The governor's office

In all four Kentucky constitutions, the first power enumerated to the governor is to serve as commander-in-chief of the state's militia and military forces. In 1799, a stipulation was added that the governor would not personally lead troops on the battlefield unless advised to do so by a resolution of the General Assembly. Such a case occurred in 1813 when Governor Isaac Shelby, a veteran of the Revolutionary War, was asked to lead a band of Kentucky troops to aid William Henry Harrison at the Battle of the Thames. For his service, Shelby received the Thanks of Congress and the Congressional Gold Medal.

Among the other powers and responsibilities of the governor that appear in all four constitutions are the power to enforce all laws, the power to fill vacancies in elected offices until the next meeting of the General Assembly, and the power to remit fines and grant pardons. The power to pardon is not applicable to cases of impeachment, and in cases of treason, a gubernatorial pardon is only effective until the end of the next session of the General Assembly, which can grant a full pardon for treason. The 1891 constitution further required that, with each application for a pardon, the governor file "a statement of the reasons for his decision thereon, which ... shall always be open to public inspection." This requirement was first proposed by a delegate to the 1850 constitutional convention, but it was rejected at that time. Historically, power in Kentucky's executive has been split amongst a variety of elected positions—including Lieutenant Governor, Attorney General, Auditor of Public Accounts, Treasurer, and several commissioners—but in the late 20th century, political power has centralized in the office of Governor.

=== Convening and adjourning the legislature ===
The power of the governor to adjourn the General Assembly for a period of up to four months if the two houses cannot agree on a time to adjourn appears in all four constitutions. The governor is also empowered to convene the General Assembly "on extraordinary occasions". Since the 1799 constitution, the governor has been permitted to call the legislature into session somewhere other than the state capital if the capital had, since the last legislative session, "become dangerous from an enemy or from contagious diseases." This was an important provision in the early days of the Commonwealth, when epidemics like smallpox posed a danger to the populace. One notable example of an attempt to employ this power was in 1900 when Republican governor William S. Taylor attempted to adjourn the legislature and re-convene it in heavily Republican London, Kentucky following the shooting of William Goebel. Taylor claimed a state of insurrection existed in the capital, but defiant Democrats refused to heed the call to adjourn or to convene in London.

The 1891 constitution added a provision that the governor must specify the reason for any specially called legislative session, and that no other business could be considered during the session. There is, however, no constitutional requirement that the legislature conduct any business during the called session. In 2007, Republican governor Ernie Fletcher called the Assembly into session to consider a long list of items. The Democratically controlled House of Representatives maintained that none of the items were urgent enough that they could not wait until the regular session convened; they claimed that Fletcher was calling the session only to boost his sagging poll numbers before the upcoming election in which he faced a challenge from Democrat Steve Beshear. The House convened on the day appointed and adjourned an hour later without transacting any business.

=== Veto ===
Unlike the U.S. President, the governor does not have the option of a pocket veto. If the governor does not make a decision to sign or veto a bill, it automatically becomes law after 10 days. In the event that the legislature adjourns to prevent the return of a bill by veto, the bill becomes law three days after the commencement of the next legislative session unless the governor explicitly vetoes it. (With the federal pocket veto, the bill is considered vetoed after ten days if the legislature adjourns.)

The 1799 constitution contained, for the first time, the power of the governor to veto legislation; this power was substantially similar to, and probably based upon, that found in the 1792 New Hampshire Constitution and the 1798 Georgia Constitution. The 1891 constitution empowered the governor with a line-item veto, but its use was forbidden on constitutional amendments and laws related to the classification of property for tax purposes. The governor's veto can be overridden by roll-call majority votes of both houses of the legislature.

=== Budget ===
Although setting the state budget is a legislative function in many states, Kentucky governors are required by statute to present a proposed biennial budget to the General Assembly for approval shortly after the beginning of its even-year sessions. The governor's budget has often been approved with few changes, but since the Republicans took control of the state senate for the first time in 1999, approval has become a much more contentious process. The General Assembly failed to pass a budget before the end of its session in both 2002 and 2004. In both cases, the state operated under an executive spending plan drafted by the governor until the legislature could re-convene and pass a budget. In 2005 the Kentucky Supreme Court ruled that the governor had no authority to expend funds without legislative approval, and that if legislators failed to pass a budget in the future, only expenditures explicitly authorized in the state constitution could be made.

=== Administration and appointments ===
Although the Kentucky constitution designates the governor as the head of the executive branch of state government, it does not specify the means of carrying out that role. Empowered to nominate all constitutional officers by the state's first constitution, that power of the office of the governor has been reduced in subsequent constitutions, as more of those offices became elective. Because the governor is not explicitly authorized by the constitution to conduct many of the functions necessary to administer the state government, the officeholder has had to rely on empowering legislation enacted by the General Assembly. With this in mind, Kentucky historian Thomas D. Clark wrote in 2004 that extensive executive powers had been granted through the creation of a large number of commissions that reported to the governor:

During the past century and a half, and especially in the later 20th century, it would have been impossible for state government to operate efficiently without a broadening of executive powers. Through the years the General Assembly has created a myriad of commissions and turned them over to the governor to exercise administrative oversight. ... All of these commissions extended the influence of the governor into every phase of human life in the commonwealth, well beyond the limitations of executive power envisioned by delegates to the constitutional convention in 1891.

By 1934, the executive branch consisted of sixty-nine boards, commissions, and agencies in addition to the constitutional officers, although the members of these commissions were often the constitutional officers themselves. Governor Ruby Laffoon proposed the Administrative Reorganization Act of 1934 to organize these boards and commissions into seventeen executive departments and seven independent agencies. The General Assembly passed this legislation, giving the executive branch some semblance of structure for the first time.

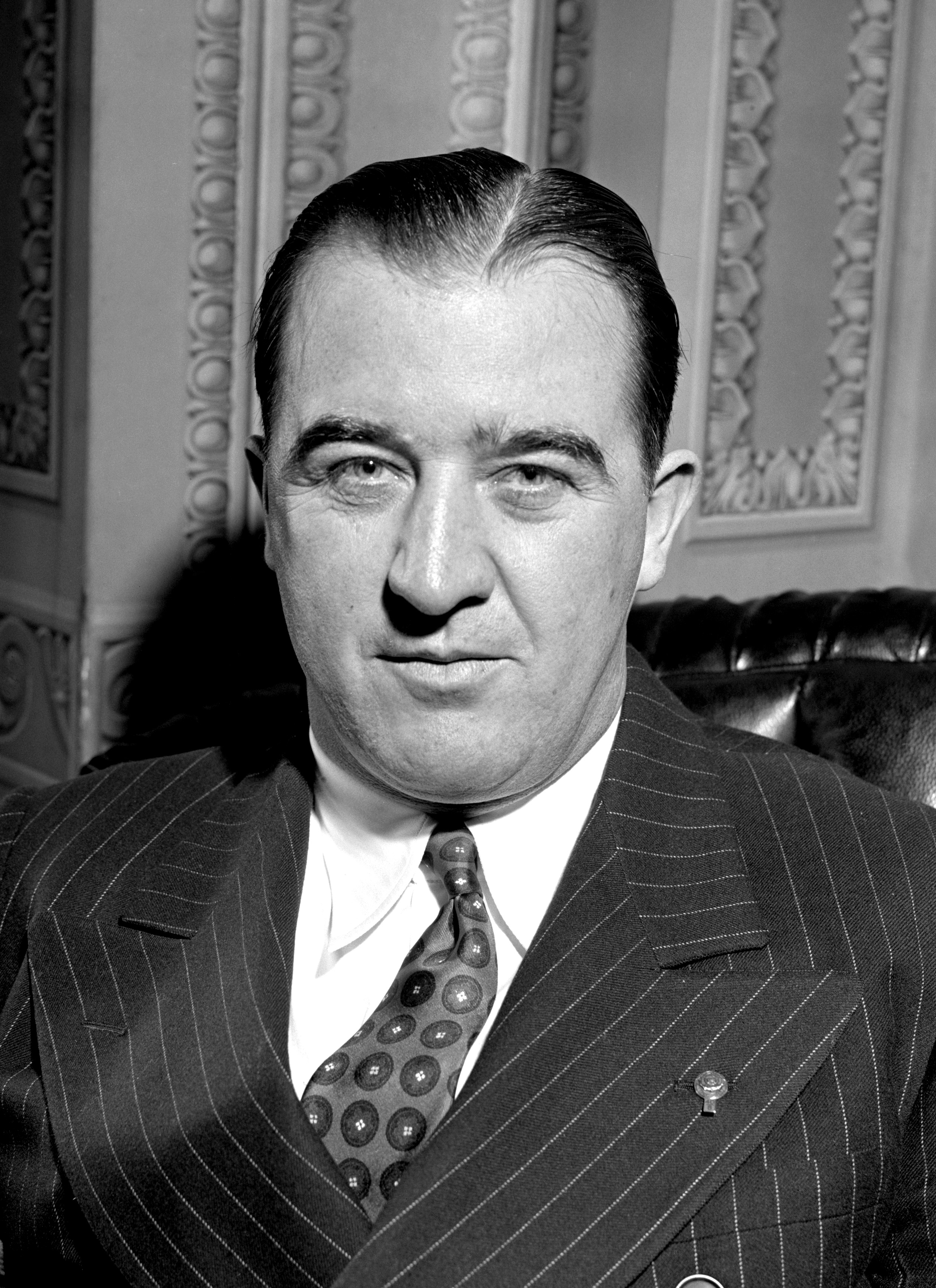
Happy Chandler created greater efficiency in state government under the Reorganization Act of 1936.

Laffoon's successor, Happy Chandler, called a special legislative session in 1936 seeking passage of another reorganization act. This act abolished several commissions and organized those remaining into ten statutory departments: Finance, Revenue, Highways, Health, Welfare, Industrial Relations, Business Regulation, Conservation, Libraries and Archives, and Mines and Minerals. The Act also created the Executive Cabinet, consisting of the constitutional officers and the heads of each of the ten statutory departments. The efficiencies created by Chandler's reorganization allowed him to pay off more than three-quarters of the state's $28.5 million debt. Besides effecting the reorganization of the executive branch, the Reorganization Act of 1936 also explicitly empowered the governor to appoint executive department heads and establish, combine, or divide departments as necessary. Later statutes gave the governor the power to appoint advisory committees on reorganization, appoint deputy heads of divisions, transfer employees and change their responsibilities within the executive branch, and establish general rules of conduct for executive branch members.

In the 35 years between the time of Chandler's reorganization and the election of Wendell H. Ford as governor in 1971, the executive branch had again become unwieldy. 60 departments and 210 boards reported directly to the governor by 1972, and duplication of services between departments had created inefficiencies. On January 1, 1973, a plan that Ford had issued in late 1972 took effect, consolidating the departments reporting to him into six program cabinets: Consumer Protection and Regulation, Development, Education and the Arts, Human Resources, Safety and Justice, and Transportation. Ford continued merging departments and reorganizing the executive branch throughout 1973 to the extent that, by the end of the year, there were only three program cabinets (Development, Education and the Arts, and Consumer Protection and Regulation) and four additional departments (Human Resources, Justice, Natural Resources and Environmental Protection, and Transportation).

By 2002, the executive branch had again grown to fourteen cabinets, but had no additional departments. Shortly after his election in 2003, Governor Ernie Fletcher undertook the last major reorganization of the executive branch to date, reducing the number of cabinets to nine—Justice and Public Safety, Education and Workforce Development, Environmental and Public Protection, Transportation, Economic Development, Health and Family Services, Finance and Administration, Tourism, Arts and Heritage, and Personnel.

Because the governor controls so many appointments to commissions—approximately 2,000 according to a 1992 estimate—the office has been historically considered one of the most powerful state executive positions in the United States. Additionally, the governor is given wide discretion in awarding state contracts, further augmenting his influence. In the second half of the 20th century, attempts were made to curb the use of the governor's appointment power for political patronage. During his second term in office, Happy Chandler issued an executive order creating a merit system that forbade the hiring or firing of state employees for political reasons; his successor, Bert Combs, pushed a new merit system through the legislature, protecting it from abolition by executive order. Despite the presence of the merit system, many governors have been criticized for abusing their appointment power. In 2005, Ernie Fletcher and several members of his administration were indicted for violating the merit system in their hiring practices; the charges were later dropped as part of an agreement with the prosecutor, Attorney General Greg Stumbo.

=== Unofficial powers ===
In The Kentucky Encyclopedia, Eastern Kentucky University professor Paul Blanchard writes that "Many observers consider the governor's informal powers—those derived from tradition, custom, and precedent—as important as the formal powers." Frequently the leaders of their political parties at the state level, Kentucky governors usually control the party's delegations to state and national party conventions. Though given few powers with regard to the legislature, Kentucky governors can exercise a great deal of influence over the General Assembly, often hand-selecting the leadership of both chambers. A move toward a more independent legislature began in the last quarter of the 20th century, particularly during the administration of Governor John Y. Brown Jr. from 1979 to 1983. Brown was much less engaged in legislative affairs than his predecessors; he did not seek to influence the selection of the legislature's leadership, and he left on vacation during one of the two legislative sessions of his term. The trend toward a coequal legislature continued under the administrations of Brown's two immediate successors, Martha Layne Collins and Wallace Wilkinson, neither of whom was considered a strong executive.

The governor is also the most visible state officer and is the center of political attention in the Commonwealth. The official host of the state when dignitaries visit, the governor frequently delivers addresses at various dedications and ceremonies, and appears on national television with the winner of the annual Kentucky Derby. The state constitution requires the governor to address the legislature periodically regarding the state of the Commonwealth. This address, traditionally given annually, is often targeted directly at the state's citizens as much as, or more so than, the legislature. The governor can use the address to extol the accomplishments of his or her term and lay out a specific plan for the upcoming legislative session; the contents of the address often shape the agenda of the session. The state's media outlets devote significant coverage to the governor's actions, and many strong governors have used the media to win support for their agendas and criticize political enemies.

== Qualifications and term ==
Candidates for the office of governor of Kentucky must be at least thirty years of age and have resided in the state for at least six years preceding the general election. The residency requirement was increased from two years to six years in the constitution of 1799 and all subsequent constitutions. The 1792 constitution—the state's first—also included an exception for candidates who had been absent from the state "on the public business of the United States or of this State." The age requirement was raised from thirty years to thirty-five years in the 1799 constitution and was returned to thirty years in the 1891 constitution.

A prohibition against any person concurrently holding the office of governor and a federal office appears in the first three state constitutions, but is absent in the state's current charter. Additionally, the 1799 constitution barred a "minister of any religious society" from holding the office. This language was possibly aimed at the sitting governor, James Garrard, who was an ordained Baptist minister and had frequently clashed with the legislature. The prohibition against ministers holding the office remained in the 1850 constitution, but was removed from the 1891 constitution.

In the 1891 constitution, a section was included that forbade anyone from holding any state office—including the office of governor—who had "either directly or indirectly, give[n], accept[ed] or knowingly carr[ied] a challenge to any person or persons to fight in single combat, with a citizen of this State, with a deadly weapon, either in or out of the State". This provision reflected the prevalence of duelling in the South at the time. The gubernatorial oath of office states:

I do solemnly swear that I will support the Constitution of the United States and the Constitution of this Commonwealth, and be faithful and true to the Commonwealth of Kentucky so long as I continue to be a citizen thereof, and that I will faithfully execute, to the best of my ability, the office of Governor according to law; and I do further solemnly swear that since the adoption of the present Constitution, I, being a citizen of this state, have not fought a duel with deadly weapons within this state, nor out of it, nor have I sent or accepted a challenge to fight a duel with deadly weapons, nor have I acted as second in carrying a challenge, nor aided or assisted any person thus offending, so help me God."

The governor's term has been for four years in all four state constitutions. The governor was not term-limited in the 1792 constitution, but in the 1799 constitution, the governor was made ineligible for re-election for seven years following the expiration of his term. The provision did not apply to then-sitting governor James Garrard, who was re-elected in 1799. In the 1850 constitution, the period of ineligibility following the expiration of the governor's term was shortened to four years, and it remained so in the 1891 constitution. In 1953, Governor Lawrence Wetherby lamented the challenges presented by the term limit coupled with biennial legislative sessions:

A Kentucky governor is elected under our constitution for four years without legal opportunity, regardless of how acceptable his program has been, to put it before the public for approval or rejection. In practical application he must successfully run the legislative gauntlet during the first hurried ninety days he is in office if he is to adopt a program and have an administration worthy of history's harsh pen. The remaining general assembly two years hence is invariably plagued with vicissitudes common to 'lame duck' tenures.

The idea of removing the gubernatorial term limit was first proposed in the 1850 constitutional convention, but was vigorously opposed by some of the state's best known statesmen of the day, including Archibald Dixon, Garrett Davis, Benjamin Hardin, and Charles A. Wickliffe. Not until 1992 was an amendment to the state constitution passed to help ameliorate the situation by making the governor eligible to succeed himself one time before becoming ineligible for four years. Succession amendments had been proposed and defeated during the administrations of John Y. Brown Jr. and Wallace Wilkinson, but then-Governor Brereton Jones was able to see it passed because, unlike Brown and Wilkinson, he was willing to exempt the present incumbents, including himself, from the succession provision. Paul E. Patton, with victories in the elections of 1995 and 1999, was the first governor to be elected to consecutive terms since the 1992 amendment. Another constitutional amendment, passed in November 2000, called for a 30-day legislative session to be held in odd-numbered years between the longer 60-day sessions held in even-numbered years.

== Election ==
In the 1792 constitution, the governor and state senators were chosen by electors, in a manner similar to the operation of the United States Electoral College. In the 1795 gubernatorial election, Benjamin Logan received 21 electoral votes, James Garrard received 17, Thomas Todd received 14, and John Brown received 1. The constitution did not specify whether election required a plurality or a majority of the electoral votes cast; in the absence of any instruction, the electors held a runoff vote, wherein most of Todd's electors voted for Garrard, giving him a majority. The secretary of state certified Garrard's election, though Attorney General John Breckinridge questioned the legality of the second vote and Logan formally protested it. Ultimately, Breckinridge determined that he was not empowered by the state constitution to intervene, and Logan gave up the challenge. The 1799 constitution changed the method of selecting the governor to direct election by majority vote and prescribed that, in the event of a tie vote, the governor would be chosen by lot in the Kentucky General Assembly. This provision has remained since 1799.

After the development of the party system, it became commonplace for political parties to choose their nominees for the office of governor via a nominating convention. Thomas Metcalfe was the first gubernatorial candidate chosen by a nominating convention; he was nominated by the National Republican Party at their convention in December 1827. Governor Ruby Laffoon, elected in 1931, was the last governor of Kentucky nominated by a convention. Laffoon's lieutenant governor, Happy Chandler, pushed the legislature to mandate party primaries, which they did in 1935. Party primaries remain required by law today. In 1992, the state constitution was amended to require candidates for governor and lieutenant governor to be nominated and elected as a ticket.

Kentucky is one of only five U.S. states to hold gubernatorial elections in odd-numbered years—commonly called an off-year election. Louisiana, Mississippi, Virginia, and New Jersey also hold off-year gubernatorial elections. The general election for governor and lieutenant governor is held on the first Tuesday after the first Monday in November. The governor and lieutenant governor are inaugurated on the fifth Tuesday after their election. This was changed from the fourth Tuesday after the election by the 1850 constitution.

== Succession ==
Under Kentucky's first constitution (1792), the Speaker of the Kentucky Senate became acting governor upon the death, resignation, or removal of the sitting governor from office, until a new election could be held. The 1799 constitution created the office of lieutenant governor, who acted as Speaker of the Senate, but was not otherwise considered a member of that body. The lieutenant governor was to become governor in the event of the sitting governor's death, resignation, or removal from office and was to act in a gubernatorial capacity any time the governor was out of the state. Whenever the lieutenant governor became the new governor, the Senate was to elect one of its members to act as Speaker; that individual then became next in the line of gubernatorial succession. A provision of the 1850 constitution added that, if the governor's term had more than two years remaining at the time of his death, resignation, or removal from office, a special election would be called to fill the office; the lieutenant governor would become the new governor and serve in the interim.

In the 1891 constitution, the chain of succession was extended. It mandated that, if the Senate was not in session and therefore did not have an elected Speaker, the secretary of state, or in the event of his inability to qualify, the attorney general, would become acting governor in the event of the death, resignation, or removal from office of the sitting governor and lieutenant governor. The secretary of state or attorney general would then be required to call the Senate into session to elect a Speaker, who would subsequently become governor. A 1992 amendment to the state constitution removed the provision under which the lieutenant governor became acting governor when the sitting governor was out of the state. It also relieved the lieutenant governor of his duties in the Senate and created the office of President of the Kentucky Senate, chosen from among the state senators, who presides over the Senate. The amendment also modified the chain of succession again—it is now as follows:

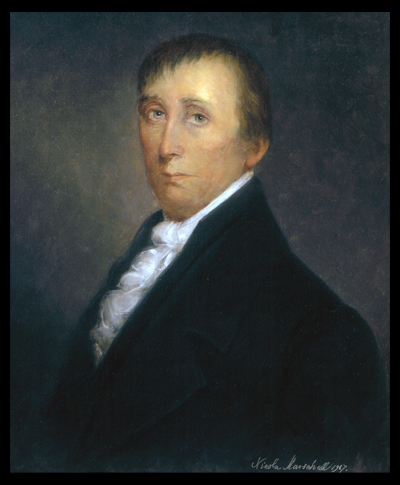
George Madison's death in 1813 occasioned the first instance of gubernatorial succession in Kentucky.

1. Governor (Andy Beshear)
2. Lieutenant Governor (Jacqueline Coleman)
3. President of the Senate (if the Senate is in session) (Robert Stivers)
4. Attorney General (if the Senate is not in session) (Russell Coleman)
5. State Auditor (if the Senate is not in session and the Attorney General fails to qualify) (Allison Ball)

If the office devolves upon the attorney general or state auditor, that individual is required to call the Senate into session to elect a president, who would subsequently become governor.

The first instance of gubernatorial succession in Kentucky's history occurred upon the death of Governor George Madison in 1816. Madison was extremely popular as a twice-wounded war hero. He died of tuberculosis just three weeks into his term. His lieutenant governor, Gabriel Slaughter, ascended to the governorship and immediately made two very unpopular appointments. These moves engendered much animosity toward Slaughter, and a movement began in the House of Representatives to hold a new election for governor. Leaders of the movement, including a young John C. Breckinridge, claimed that Slaughter was only the "acting governor" until a new governor was elected. The call for a new election failed in the House in 1815, but was approved by the House in 1817 only to fail in the Senate. Slaughter served out the rest of Madison's term and in so doing, established the precedent that the lieutenant governor would be the permanent successor to the governor upon the latter's death, resignation, or removal from office.

Besides Madison, four other governors have died while in office—John Breathitt, James Clark, John L. Helm, and William Goebel. All died of natural causes except Goebel, who is the only governor of any U.S. state to have been assassinated. Goebel lost the contentious 1899 gubernatorial election to William S. Taylor, but challenged the results. While the General Assembly was considering the challenge, Goebel was shot. Days later, the General Assembly decided in favor of Goebel, ousting Taylor from office and making Goebel governor. Goebel was sworn in on his sick bed and died two days later. His lieutenant governor, J. C. W. Beckham, succeeded him.

7 men have resigned the office of governor before the end of their terms—John J. Crittenden, Beriah Magoffin, John W. Stevenson, Augustus O. Stanley, Happy Chandler, Earle C. Clements, and Wendell H. Ford. 6 resigned to accept a higher office: Crittenden was appointed Attorney General of the United States and the other 5 were elected to the U.S. Senate. Only Beriah Magoffin resigned under duress. A Confederate sympathizer during the Civil War, Magoffin's power was entirely checked by a hostile, pro-Union legislature. With the state's government in gridlock, Magoffin agreed to resign in exchange for being able to name his successor. Lieutenant Governor Linn Boyd had died in office, and the Speaker of the Senate, John F. Fisk, was not acceptable to Magoffin as a successor. Fisk resigned as Speaker, and the Senate elected Magoffin's choice, James Fisher Robinson as Speaker. Magoffin then resigned, Robinson was elevated to governor, and Fisk was re-elected as Speaker of the Senate.

All elected officials in Kentucky, including the governor, are subject to impeachment for "any misdemeanors in office". The articles of impeachment must be issued by the House of Representatives and the trial is conducted by the Senate. If convicted, the governor is subject to removal from office and may be prohibited from holding elected office in the state thereafter. Impeached governors may also be subject to trial in the criminal or civil court system. No governor of Kentucky has been impeached.

== Compensation and residence ==
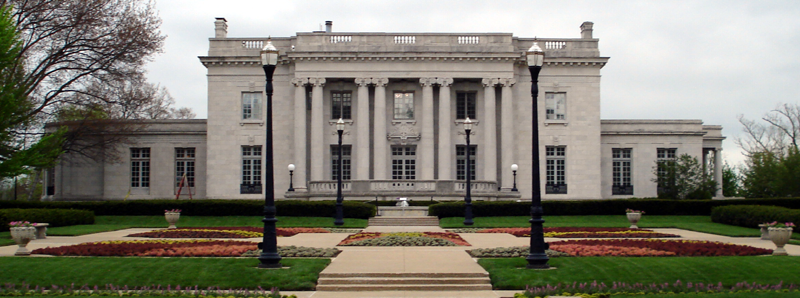
The Governor's Mansion is the official residence of the governor of Kentucky.

Each iteration of the Kentucky Constitution has provided that the governor receive a salary. Under the first three constitutions, the governor's salary could not be increased or reduced while he was in office; this provision was extended to all public officials in the present constitution. The governor's salary is set by law, and is equal to $60,000 times the increase in the consumer price index between January 1, 1984, and the beginning of the current calendar year. In 2014, the governor's salary was $186,730.

The Kentucky Governor's Mansion is the official residence of the governor of Kentucky. The present Governor's Mansion, constructed in 1914 and listed on the National Register of Historic Places in 1972, is located at 704 Capitol Avenue in the state capital of Frankfort. It is the second building to serve as the official residence of the governor of Kentucky. The Kentucky Revised Statutes provide that "[t]he Governor shall have the use of the mansion and the furniture therein and premises, free of rent, but the purchase of furniture for the mansion shall be upon the recommendation of the secretary of the Finance and Administration Cabinet".

The state's first governor's mansion was constructed during the gubernatorial tenure of James Garrard. According to tradition, future governors Thomas Metcalfe (a stonemason) and Robert P. Letcher (who worked at his father's brickyard) participated in the construction of the first governor's mansion. After the construction of the present governor's mansion, the old governor's mansion became the official residence of the lieutenant governor. Lieutenant governor Steve Henry vacated the mansion in 2002 so it could be renovated; following the renovation, it became a state guest house and official entertainment space for the governor. For many years, the mansion was the oldest official residence still in use in the United States. Located at 420 High Street in Frankfort, it was listed on the National Register of Historic Places in 1971.

== History of the office ==
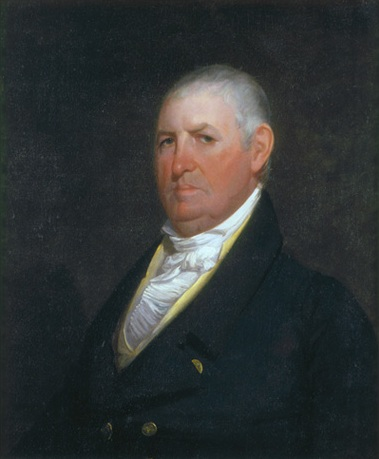
Isaac Shelby, the first and fifth governor of Kentucky

Political parties had developed in the United States before Kentucky became a state. Because most early Kentuckians were Virginians, they naturally allied with the Democratic-Republicans, the party of Thomas Jefferson and James Madison; the latter was a cousin of George Madison, the state's sixth governor. Political victories were few and far between for Federalists in Kentucky, and none of Kentucky's governors were members of the Federalist Party. Military service was the most important consideration for voters in Kentucky's early gubernatorial elections.

The Federalist Party had died out nationally by 1820, but new party divisions were soon to form in Kentucky. The Panic of 1819 left many Kentuckians deeply in debt and without a means of repaying their creditors. Two factions grew up around the issue of debt relief. Those who favored laws favorable to debtors were dubbed the "Relief Party" and those who favored laws protecting creditors were called the "Anti-Relief Party". While not formal political parties—members of both factions still considered themselves Democratic-Republicans—these factions defined the political dialogue of the 1820s in Kentucky. The debt relief issue began under Gabriel Slaughter, who identified with the Anti-Relief Party, but Slaughter's two immediate successors, John Adair and Joseph Desha, were members of the Relief Party. The struggle between the two parties culminated in the Old Court – New Court controversy, an attempt by the pro-relief legislature to abolish the Court of Appeals because the court overturned some debt relief measures as unconstitutional. The controversy ended with the restoration of the Old Court over Desha's veto in late 1826.

Although many Old Court supporters—typically the state's wealthy aristocracy—gravitated to the National Republican Party (later to be called Whigs) that formed in the 1820s, it is inaccurate to assume the Anti-Relief Party as a whole became National Republicans and the Relief Party became Democrats. The primary factor in determining which party Kentuckians aligned with was their faith in Whig Party founder and native son, Henry Clay. From the election of Thomas Metcalfe in 1828 to the expiration of John L. Helm's term in 1851, only one Democrat held the office of governor: John Breathitt, who died a year and a half into his term and was succeeded in office by his lieutenant governor, James Turner Morehead, a National Republican.

Following the collapse of the Whig Party in the early 1850s, many former Whigs joined the Know Nothing, or American Party, and Charles S. Morehead was elected governor from that party in 1855. Sectarian tensions gripped the state in the lead-up to the Civil War, and while the majority of Kentuckians favored the preservation of the Union above all else, a self-constituted group of Confederate sympathizers met at Russellville and formed a Confederate government for the state. While this provisional government never displaced the elected government in Frankfort, two men served as Confederate governors of Kentucky.

From the close of the Civil War until 1895, Kentuckians elected a series of Bourbon Democrats with Confederate sympathies as governor, including two men—James B. McCreary and Simon Bolivar Buckner—who had served in the Confederate States Army. The Democratic dominance was broken by William O'Connell Bradley, who was elected the state's first Republican governor in 1895. Bradley's election marked the beginning of thirty years of true, two-party competition for the governorship in the state.

== Timeline ==
Timeline of Kentucky governors

== See also ==
- 2023 Kentucky gubernatorial election – most recent gubernatorial election
