= Millersburg, Kentucky =

- City
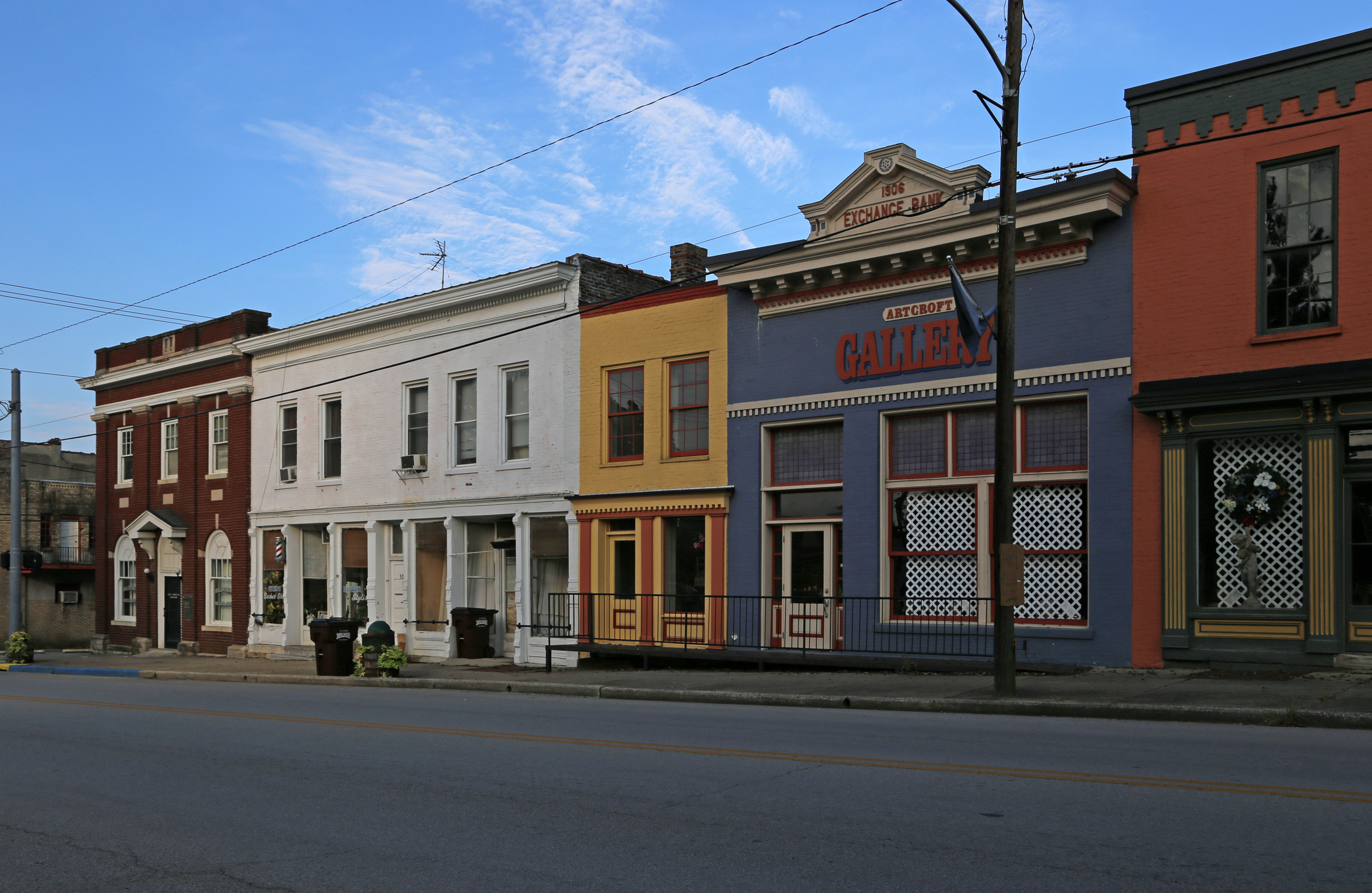
- Motto(s): "History, Hospitality, Opportunity"
- Location of Millersburg in Bourbon County, Kentucky.
- Coordinates: 38°18′15″N 84°08′42″W
- Country: United States
- State: Kentucky
- County: Bourbon
- Established: 1817
- Incorporated: 1874
- Reincorporated: 1893

Area
  - Total: 0.41 sq mi (1.06 km^{2})
  - Land: 0.41 sq mi (1.06 km^{2})
  - Water: 0 sq mi (0.00 km^{2})
- Elevation: 827 ft (252 m)

Population (2020)
  - Total: 747
  - Density: 1,823.3/sq mi (703.99/km^{2})
- Time zone: UTC-5 (Eastern (EST))
  - Summer (DST): UTC-4 (EDT)
- ZIP code: 40348
- Area code: 859
- FIPS code: 21-52302
- GNIS feature ID: 2404264
- Website: www.millersburgky.com

Millersburg is a home rule-class city in Bourbon County, Kentucky, United States. As of the 2020 census, Millersburg had a population of 747. It is part of the Lexington–Fayette Metropolitan Statistical Area.

== History ==
Millersburg was founded in 1817, and was named for John Miller. The post office was referred to as "Millersburgh" until 1889.

Millersburg Military Institute operated from 1893 to 2014.

== Geography ==
Millersburg is located in northeastern Bourbon County reaching to the Nicholas County border. U.S. Route 68 (Main Street) passes through the center of Millersburg.

According to the United States Census Bureau, Millersburg has a total area of 0.42 square miles (1.1 km^{2}), all land.

== Demographics ==
Historical population
Census	Pop.	Note	%±
1800	92		—
1810	238		158.7%
1830	470		—
1850	214		—
1860	556		159.8%
1870	675		21.4%
1880	858		27.1%
1890	850		−0.9%
1900	862		1.4%
1910	799		−7.3%
1920	1,117		39.8%
1930	770		−31.1%
1940	850		10.4%
1950	828		−2.6%
1960	913		10.3%
1970	788		−13.7%
1980	987		25.3%
1990	937		−5.1%
2000	842		−10.1%
2010	792		−5.9%
2020	747		−5.7%
U.S. Decennial Census

As of the 2000 census, there were 842 people, 356 households, and 248 families residing in the city. The population density was 2,432.5 inhabitants per square mile (939.2/km^{2}). There were 390 housing units at an average density of 1,126.7 per square mile (435.0/km^{2}). The racial makeup of the city was 94.66% White, 3.44% African American, 0.83% Native American, 0.59% from other races, and 0.48% from two or more races. Hispanic or Latino of any race were 1.19% of the population.

There were 356 households, out of which 29.5% had children under the age of 18 living with them, 50.8% were married couples living together, 14.6% had a female householder with no husband present, and 30.3% were non-families. 26.7% of all households were made up of individuals, and 11.8% had someone living alone who was 65 years of age or older. The average household size was 2.37 and the average family size was 2.84.

In the city, the population was spread out, with 24.0% under the age of 18, 8.4% from 18 to 24, 27.0% from 25 to 44, 24.9% from 45 to 64, and 15.7% who were 65 years of age or older. The median age was 38 years. For every 100 females, there were 91.8 males. For every 100 females age 18 and over, there were 92.8 males.

The median income for a household in the city was $25,500, and the median income for a family was $32,692. Males had a median income of $29,861 versus $18,333 for females. The per capita income for the city was $13,906. About 12.4% of families and 15.7% of the population were below the poverty line, including 23.0% of those under the age of 18 and 11.6% of those age 65 or over.

== Notable people ==
- Blanton Collier, American football coach born in Millersburg
- Jim Kelly, martial artist of the 1970s, born in Millersburg. He co-starred with Bruce Lee in the film Enter the Dragon.
- Mae Street Kidd (1909–1999), State Representative 1968–1984, representing Louisville's 41st state legislative district; born in Millersburg
- David McDonald, judge, born in Millersburg
- Alma Bridwell White, founder of the Pillar of Fire Church and Ku Klux Klan advocate

== See also ==
- List of cities in Kentucky
