= Thomas Metcalfe (Kentucky politician) =

American politician

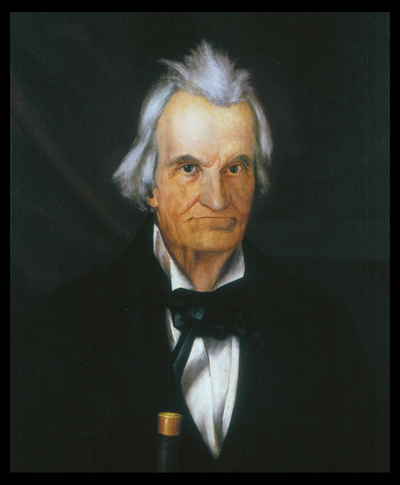

10th Governor of Kentucky
- In office August 26, 1828 – September 4, 1832
- Lieutenant: John Breathitt
- Preceded by: Joseph Desha
- Succeeded by: John Breathitt

Member of the U. S. House of Representatives from Kentucky's 2nd district and 4th district
- In office March 4, 1819 – June 1, 1828
- Preceded by: Joseph Desha; Samuel H. Woodson
- Succeeded by: Robert P. Letcher; John Chambers

United States Senator from Kentucky
- In office June 23, 1848 – March 3, 1849
- Preceded by: John J. Crittenden
- Succeeded by: Henry Clay

Member of the Kentucky House of Representatives
- In office 1812–1816

Personal details
- Born: March 20, 1780 Fauquier County, Virginia, US
- Died: August 18, 1855 (aged 75) Nicholas County, Kentucky, US
- Party: National Republican; Whig
- Spouse: Nancy Mason
- Profession: Soldier, Stonemason

Military service
- Branch/service: Kentucky militia
- Rank: Captain
- Battles/wars: War of 1812

Thomas Metcalfe (March 20, 1780 – August 18, 1855), also known as Thomas Metcalf or as "Stonehammer", was an American politician who was a U.S. representative, senator, and the tenth governor of Kentucky. He was the first gubernatorial candidate in the state's history to be chosen by a nominating convention rather than a caucus. He was also the first governor of Kentucky who was not a member of the Democratic-Republican Party.

At age 16, Metcalfe was apprenticed to his older brother and became a stonemason. He helped construct the Green County courthouse, known as the oldest courthouse in Kentucky. Later, political opponents would mock his trade, giving him the nickname "Old Stone Hammer." His political career began with four terms in the Kentucky House of Representatives. His service was interrupted by the War of 1812, in which he commanded a company in the defense of Fort Meigs. At the age of thirty-eight, he was elected to the U.S. House of Representatives. He held his seat in the House for five terms, then resigned to run for governor. In an election decided by 709 votes, Metcalfe defeated William T. Barry in the gubernatorial election of 1828. Metcalfe's predecessor, Joseph Desha was so stunned by his party's loss that he threatened not to vacate the governor's mansion. Ultimately, however, he respected the will of the people, and allowed an orderly transition.

Metcalfe's primary concern as governor was the issue of internal improvements. Among his proposed projects were a road connecting Shelbyville to Louisville and a canal on the Falls of the Ohio. When President Andrew Jackson vetoed funds to construct a turnpike connecting Maysville and Lexington, Metcalfe built it anyway, paying for it entirely with state funds. Following his term as governor, he served in the state senate, and completed the unfinished term of John J. Crittenden in the U.S. Senate in 1848. After this, he retired to "Forest Retreat", his estate in Nicholas County, where he died of cholera in 1855. Metcalfe County, Kentucky, was named in his honor.

== Early life ==
Thomas Metcalfe was born on March 20, 1780, to John Metcalfe and his third wife, Sarah "Sally" Dent (Chinn) Metcalfe in Fauquier County, Virginia. His father served as a captain in the Revolutionary War. In 1784, the Metcalfe family settled near Russell's Cave in Fayette County, Virginia (now Kentucky). Some years later, they would move to a farm in Nicholas County.

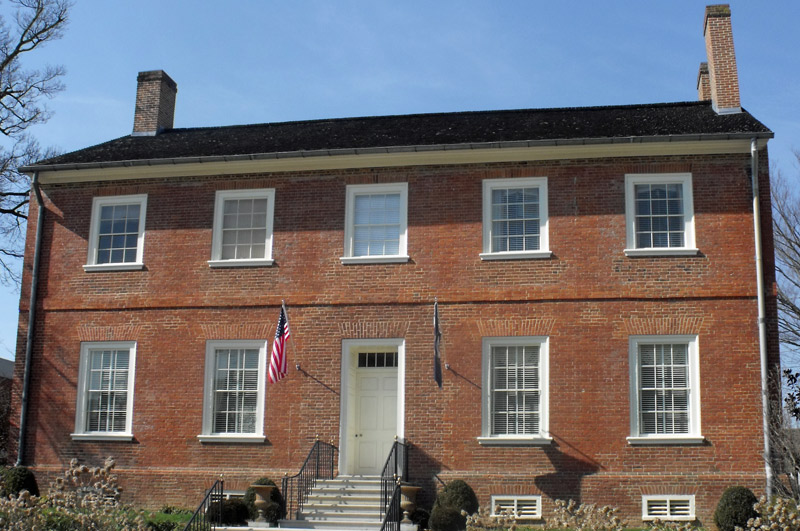
Metcalfe helped build Kentucky's first governor's mansion.

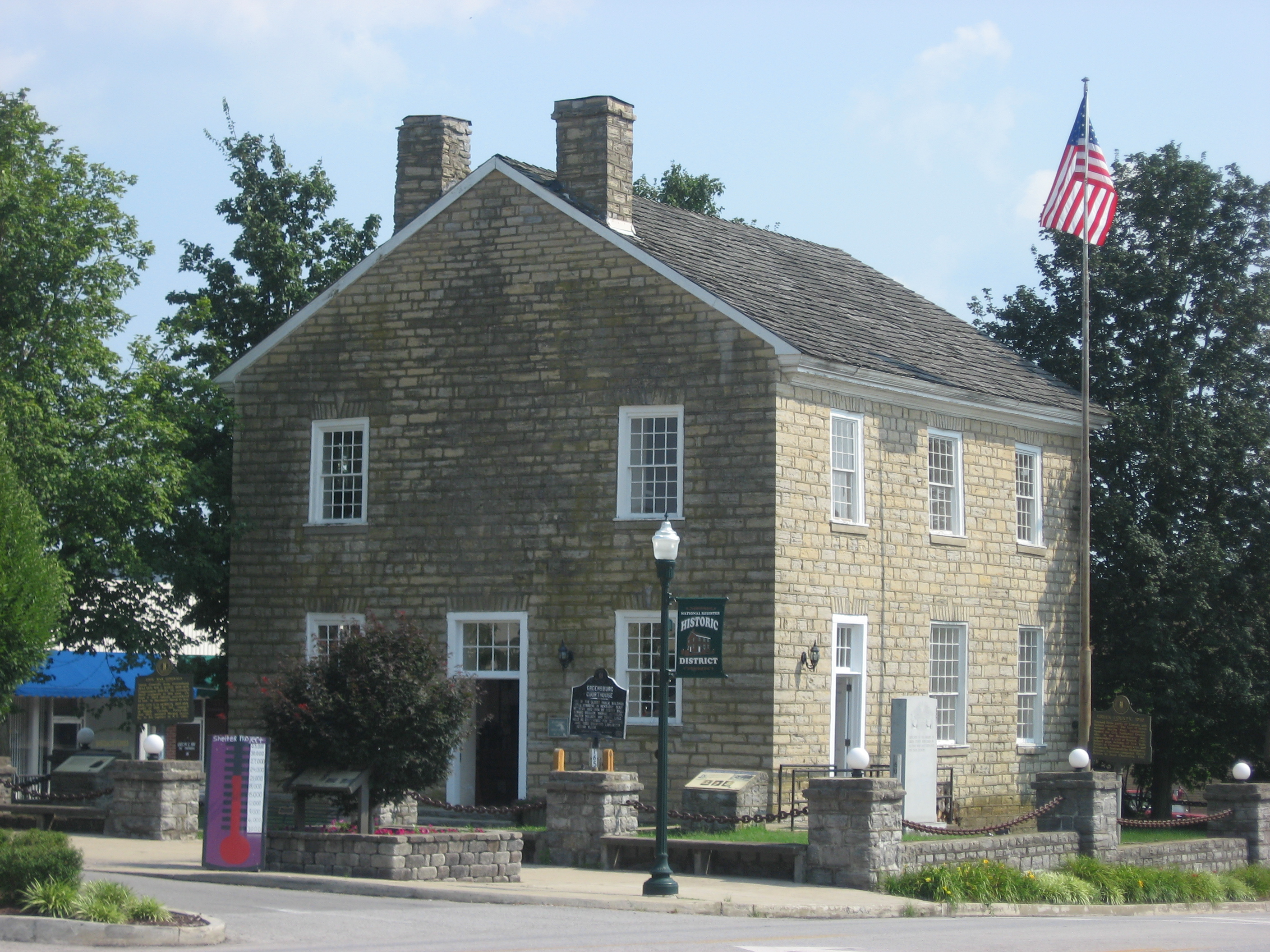
Metcalfe helped build Ky Green County Courthouse in use from 1803 to 1931

Metcalfe received only a rudimentary education, and at age sixteen, he was apprenticed to his brother and learned the craft of stonemasonry. Three years later, their father died, leaving the brothers to provide for their mother and younger siblings. Metcalfe became one of the most prominent stonemasons and building contractors during the settlement period of Kentucky. A number of his stone houses survive and are listed on the National Register of Historic Places, including his first home in Robertson County. Other structures built by the Metcalfe brothers are the state's first governor's mansion and the Green County courthouse, known as the oldest courthouse in Kentucky, and the Presbyterian church at West Union in far southern Ohio.

On October 2, 1801, Metcalfe enlisted as a lieutenant in the 29th Regiment of the Kentucky Militia. He was promoted to captain on October 12, 1802. About 1806, Metcalfe married Nancy Mason of Fairfax, Virginia. The couple had four children. Between 1817 and 1820, Metcalfe built a house for his family in Nicholas County. The estate was dubbed "Forest Retreat" by statesman Henry Clay who, on his first visit to the newly constructed house, told Metcalfe, "Tom, you have here a veritable Forest Retreat."

== Political career ==
Metcalfe's political career began in 1812 when he was elected to represent Nicholas County in the Kentucky House of Representatives. His service was interrupted by the War of 1812. In 1813, he raised a company of volunteers and commanded them at the Battle of Fort Meigs. While he was away at war, the voters of his district re-elected him to the Kentucky House; only thirteen votes were cast against him. He continued to serve in the Kentucky House until 1816.

=== In the House of Representatives ===
At the age of thirty-eight, Metcalfe was elected to the Sixteenth Congress, defeating Joshua Desha. During his tenure in the House, which lasted five terms, he was the chairman of the Committee on Indian Affairs and the Committee on Militia. He opposed the Second Bank of the United States, but favored extension of credit to purchasers of public land. In 1821, he proposed granting preemption rights to squatters. A slaveowner himself, he opposed restrictions on slavery in Missouri and the Louisiana Purchase.

In James Monroe's annual address to the legislature in December 1822, he called on Congress to report on how to best deal with the Seminoles that inhabited the recently acquired territory of Florida. As chair of the Committee on Indian Affairs, Metcalfe delivered the report on February 21, 1823. His committee found that, under the terms of the Adams-Onís Treaty that transferred control of Florida to the United States from Spain, the Seminoles were to be accorded the same privileges as U.S. citizens. Accordingly, the committee recommended that each Seminole family be given a land grant. They hoped that this would help break the tribal loyalties of the Seminoles and expedite their amalgamation into white society. The committee's report was largely ignored.

In 1826, Metcalfe served on a House committee that investigated allegations that Vice-president John C. Calhoun had improperly benefited from a contract he awarded while serving as Secretary of War in 1822. While Calhoun was cleared of any wrongdoing, his friend, South Carolina Representative George McDuffie, began an exchange of correspondence with Metcalfe regarding the proceedings. The correspondence became heated, and McDuffie challenged Metcalfe to a duel. As the recipient of the challenge, Metcalfe had the right to choose the terms of the engagement. He chose rifles as the weapon at a distance of 90 feet. McDuffie insisted that wounds from a previous duel had left him incapable of handling a rifle, and proposed pistols as an alternative. Metcalfe replied that he had never handled a pistol in his life. Unable to come to an agreement on the conditions of the duel, both sides eventually dropped the matter entirely.

=== Governor of Kentucky ===
Metcalfe resigned his seat in the House on June 1, 1828, in order to run for the governorship of Kentucky. He was chosen as the candidate of the National Republican Party at their nominating convention and was the first gubernatorial candidate in the state to be chosen using this method. He defeated William T. Barry by a margin of 709 votes, but his running mate, Joseph R. Underwood, was badly defeated by the Democratic-Republican nominee, John Breathitt. Metcalfe's election in 1828 marked the first time the governorship had been won by a candidate who was not a Democratic-Republican. However, only one Democratic-Republican would hold the office between Metcalfe's term and the election of Lazarus W. Powell in 1851.

Joseph Desha, the outgoing governor, refused to believe that his party had lost the election. He disliked Metcalfe not only due to his party affiliation, but also because of his occupation as a stonemason, which he believed was too low a calling for a governor. Metcalfe's opponents made slights on the quality of his stone work and his views on the Old Court-New Court controversy. When told about these charges, Metcalfe remarked "They may say what they like about my views, but the first man that dares to attack my character, I will cleave his skull with my stone hammer, as I would cleave a rock." As word of this remark spread, Metcalfe was given the nickname "Old Stone Hammer." Despite his threats to remain in the governor's mansion until the legislature convened, Desha respected the will of the people, and left the residence on September 2, 1828.

Metcalfe opposed the spoils system and the doctrine of nullification. He favored protective tariffs and federal aid for internal improvements. He oversaw the establishment of a road connecting Shelbyville to Louisville. When President Andrew Jackson vetoed federal aid for a turnpike connecting Maysville and Lexington, Metcalfe continued constructing it with state funds. (The road is now a portion of U.S. Route 68.) Metcalfe's term also saw the commissioning of the state's first railroad and the beginning of plans for a canal at the Falls of the Ohio. At the governor's recommendation, the state legislature approved additional aid for education, and the creation of district schools.

== Later life and death ==
Following his term as governor, Metcalfe represented Nicholas and Bracken Counties in the Kentucky Senate from 1834 to 1838. In 1836, he served as a Whig presidential elector, and he presided over the Kentucky Whig Convention in Harrodsburg on August 26, 1839. From 1840 to 1849, he served as president of the state board of internal improvements. Finally, he was appointed and subsequently elected as a Whig to the United States Senate to fill the vacancy caused by the resignation of John J. Crittenden. He served from June 23, 1848, to March 3, 1849. During his short tenure, he denounced secession, and asserted that Kentucky would remain part of the Union.

After his term in the Senate Metcalfe engaged in agricultural pursuits near Carlisle, Kentucky. He died of cholera in his home on August 18, 1855. He was interred in the family burial ground at Forest Retreat. Metcalfe County, Kentucky, was formed in 1860 and named in his honor. "Forest Retreat" was listed on the National Register of Historic Places on October 2, 1973.

== See also ==
- Category:Thomas Metcalfe buildings

Party political offices
First	National Republican nominee for Governor of Kentucky; 1828	Succeeded by Richard Aylett Buckner
U.S. House of Representatives
Preceded by Joseph Desha	United States Representative from Kentucky's 4th District; 1819–1823	Succeeded by Robert P. Letcher
Preceded by Samuel H. Woodson	United States Representative from Kentucky's 2nd District; 1823–1828	Succeeded by John Chambers
Political offices
Preceded by Joseph Desha	Governor of Kentucky; 1828–1832	Succeeded by John Breathitt
U.S. Senate
Preceded by John J. Crittenden	U.S. senator (Class 3) from Kentucky; 1848–1849; Served alongside: Joseph R. Underwood	Succeeded by Henry Clay
