= 1926 United States Senate elections =

- November 2, 1926 (Note: There were also special elections in June, September, and November 1926.)
- Class 3

32 of the 96 seats in the United States Senate 49 seats needed for a majority
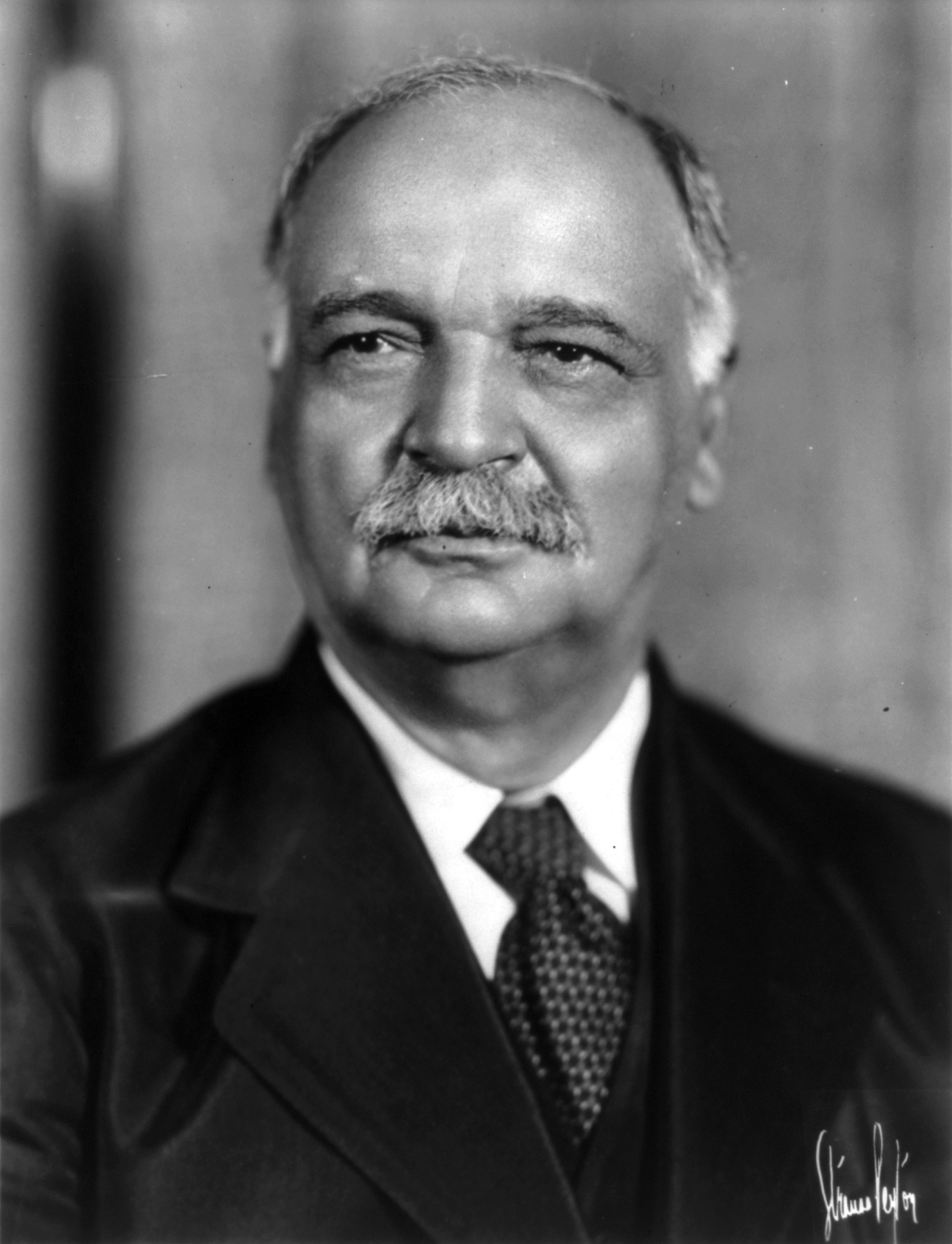

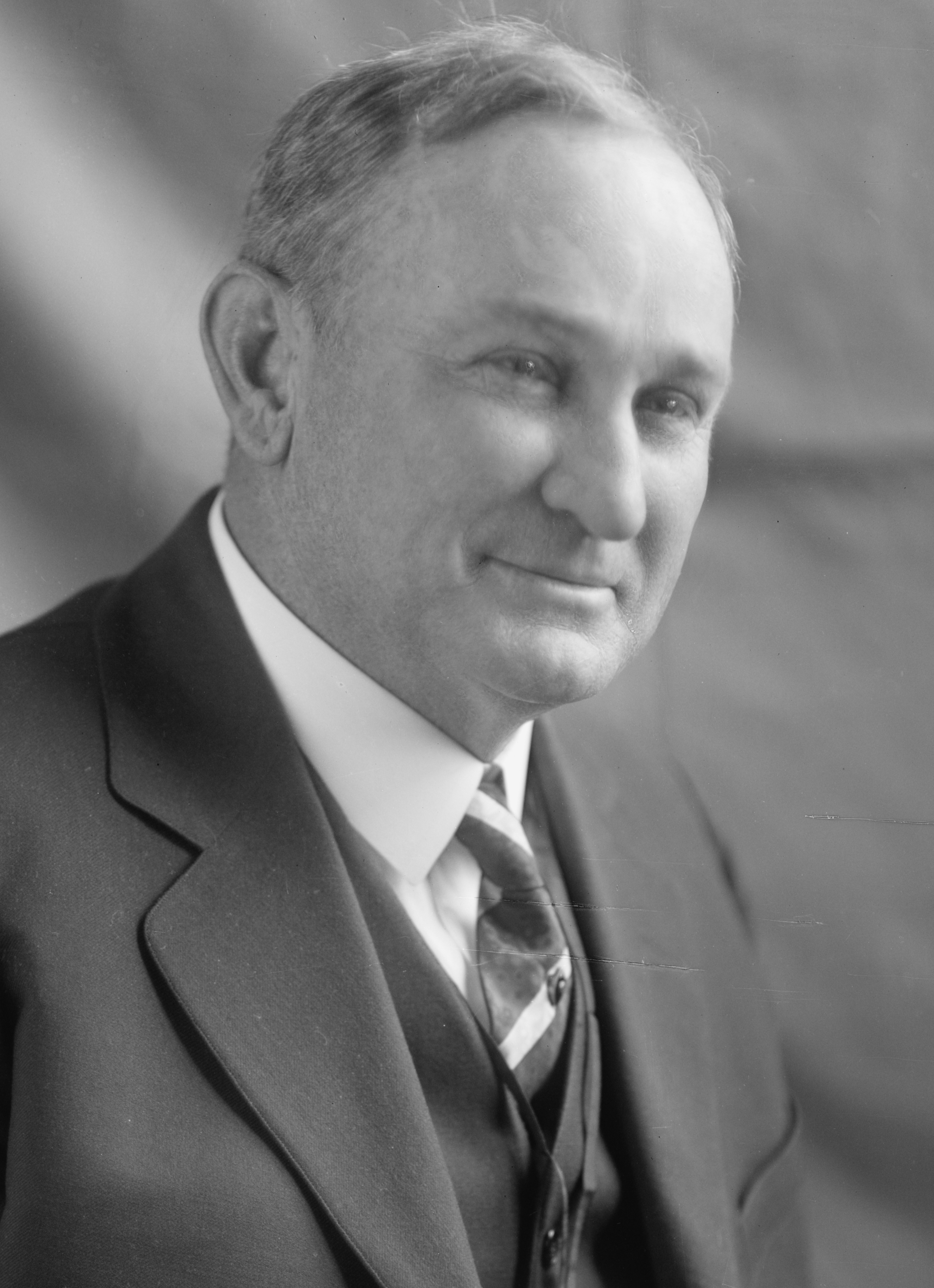
	Majority party	Minority party
Leader	Charles Curtis	Joseph Robinson
Party	Republican	Democratic
Leader since	November 9, 1924	December 3, 1923
Leader's seat	Kansas	Arkansas
Seats before	56	39
Seats after	49	46
Seat change	▼7	▲7
Seats up	28	7
Seats won	21	14
	Third party
Party	Farmer–Labor
Seats before	1
Seats after	1
Seat change	Steady
Seats up	0
Seats won	0
- Results of the elections: Democratic gain Democratic hold Republican hold No election
Majority Leader before election
Charles Curtis
Republican
Elected Majority Leader
Charles Curtis
Republican

The 1926 United States Senate elections were elections for the United States Senate that occurred in the middle of Republican President Calvin Coolidge's second term. The 32 seats of Class 3 were contested in regular elections, and special elections were held to fill vacancies. The Republican majority was reduced by seven seats.

== Gains, losses, and holds ==
=== Retirements ===
One Republican and one Democrat retired instead of seeking re-election.

State	Senator	Replaced by
Alabama	Oscar Underwood	Hugo Black
Iowa	David W. Stewart	Smith W. Brookhart

=== Defeats ===
Ten Republicans sought re-election but lost in the primary or general election. One Republican sought election to finish the unexpired term but lost in the general election and one Republican sought election to finish the unexpired term and election to a full term but lost in both the special election and the regular election.

State	Senator	Replaced by
Arizona	Ralph H. Cameron	Carl Hayden
Colorado	Rice W. Means	Charles W. Waterman
Illinois	William B. McKinley	Frank L. Smith
Kentucky	Richard P. Ernst	Alben W. Barkley
Maryland	Ovington Weller	Millard Tydings
Massachusetts	William M. Butler	David I. Walsh
Missouri	George H. Williams	Harry B. Hawes
New York	James Wadsworth	Robert F. Wagner
Oklahoma	John W. Harreld	Elmer Thomas
Oregon	Robert N. Stanfield	Frederick Steiwer
Pennsylvania	George W. Pepper	William S. Vare
Wisconsin	Irvine Lenroot	John J. Blaine

=== Death ===
One Republican died on August 23, 1926, and his seat remained vacant until the election.

State	Senator	Replaced by
Maine	Bert M. Fernald	Arthur R. Gould

=== Post-election changes ===
State	Senator	Replaced by
New Mexico	Andrieus A. Jones	Bronson M. Cutting
Idaho	Frank R. Gooding	John Thomas
Ohio	Frank B. Willis	Cyrus Locher
Michigan	Woodbridge N. Ferris	Arthur H. Vandenberg

== Change in composition ==
=== Before the elections ===
At the beginning of 1926.

		D_{1}	D_{2}	D_{3}	D_{4}	D_{5}	D_{6}	D_{7}	D_{8}
D_{18}	D_{17}	D_{16}	D_{15}	D_{14}	D_{13}	D_{12}	D_{11}	D_{10}	D_{9}
D_{19}	D_{20}	D_{21}	D_{22}	D_{23}	D_{24}	D_{25}	D_{26}	D_{27}	D_{28}
D_{38} N.C. Ran	D_{37} La. Ran	D_{36} Ga. Ran	D_{35} Fla. Ran	D_{34} Ark. Ran	D_{33} Ala. Retired	D_{32}	D_{31}	D_{30}	D_{29}
D_{39} S.C. Ran	FL_{1}	R_{56} Wisc. Ran	R_{55} Wash. Ran	R_{54} Vt. Ran	R_{53} Utah; Ran	R_{52} S.D. Ran	R_{51} Pa. Ran	R_{50} Ore. Ran	R_{49} Okla. Ran
Majority →									R_{49} Okla. Ran
R_{39} Ky. Ran	R_{40} Maine (sp); Ran	R_{41} Md. Died	R_{42} Mass. (sp); Ran	R_{43} Mo. (reg) & Mo. (sp); Ran	R_{44} Nev. Ran	R_{45} N.H. Ran	R_{46} N.Y. Ran	R_{47} N.D. (sp); Ran N.D. Ran	R_{48} Ohio; Ran
R_{38} Kan. Ran	R_{37} Iowa (reg); Retired Iowa (sp); Ran	R_{36} Ind. (sp); Ran	R_{35} Ind. Ran	R_{34} Ill. Ran	R_{33} Idaho; Ran	R_{32} Conn. Ran	R_{31} Colo. Ran	R_{30} Calif. Ran	R_{29} Ariz. Ran
R_{19}	R_{20}	R_{21}	R_{22}	R_{23}	R_{24}	R_{25}	R_{26}	R_{27}	R_{28}
R_{18}	R_{17}	R_{16}	R_{15}	R_{14}	R_{13}	R_{12}	R_{11}	R_{10}	R_{9}
		R_{1}	R_{2}	R_{3}	R_{4}	R_{5}	R_{6}	R_{7}	R_{8}

=== Elections results ===
		D_{1}	D_{2}	D_{3}	D_{4}	D_{5}	D_{6}	D_{7}	D_{8}
D_{18}	D_{17}	D_{16}	D_{15}	D_{14}	D_{13}	D_{12}	D_{11}	D_{10}	D_{9}
D_{19}	D_{20}	D_{21}	D_{22}	D_{23}	D_{24}	D_{25}	D_{26}	D_{27}	D_{28}
D_{38} Ky. Gain	D_{37} Ga. Re-elected	D_{36} Fla. Re-elected	D_{35} Ark. Re-elected	D_{34} Ariz. Gain	D_{33} Ala. Hold	D_{32}	D_{31}	D_{30}	D_{29}
D_{39} La. Re-elected	D_{40} Md. Gain	D_{41} Mass. (sp); Gain (Note: Appointee defeated)	D_{42} Mo. (reg) & Mo. (sp); Gain	D_{43} N.Y. Gain	D_{44} N.C. Re-elected	D_{45} Okla. Gain	D_{46} S.C. Re-elected	FL_{1}	R_{49} Wisc. Hold
Majority →									R_{49} Wisc. Hold
R_{39} Nev. Re-elected	R_{40} N.H. Re-elected	R_{41} N.D. (sp); Elected (Note: Appointee elected) N.D. Re-elected	R_{42} Ohio; Re-elected	R_{43} Ore. Hold	R_{44} Pa. Hold (Note: Senate refused to qualify)	R_{45} S.D. Re-elected	R_{46} Utah; Re-elected	R_{47} Vt. Re-elected	R_{48} Wash. Re-elected
R_{38} Maine (sp); Hold	R_{37} Kan. Re-elected	R_{36} Iowa (reg); Hold Iowa (sp); Elected	R_{35} Ind. (sp); Elected	R_{34} Ind. Re-elected	R_{33} Ill. Hold	R_{32} Idaho; Re-elected	R_{31} Conn. Re-elected	R_{30} Colo. Hold	R_{29} Calif. Re-elected
R_{19}	R_{20}	R_{21}	R_{22}	R_{23}	R_{24}	R_{25}	R_{26}	R_{27}	R_{28}
R_{18}	R_{17}	R_{16}	R_{15}	R_{14}	R_{13}	R_{12}	R_{11}	R_{10}	R_{9}
		R_{1}	R_{2}	R_{3}	R_{4}	R_{5}	R_{6}	R_{7}	R_{8}

=== At the beginning of the next Congress ===
		D_{1}	D_{2}	D_{3}	D_{4}	D_{5}	D_{6}	D_{7}	D_{8}
D_{18}	D_{17}	D_{16}	D_{15}	D_{14}	D_{13}	D_{12}	D_{11}	D_{10}	D_{9}
D_{19}	D_{20}	D_{21}	D_{22}	D_{23}	D_{24}	D_{25}	D_{26}	D_{27}	D_{28}
D_{38}	D_{37}	D_{36}	D_{35}	D_{34}	D_{33}	D_{32}	D_{31}	D_{30}	D_{29}
D_{39}	D_{40}	D_{41}	D_{42}	D_{43}	D_{44}	D_{45}	D_{46}	D_{47} Challenged (Note: Democrat Daniel F. Steck successfully challenged the 1924 election of Republican Smith W. Brookhart and the Senate awarded Steck the seat on April 12, 1926.)	FL_{1}
Plurality ↑
R_{39}	R_{40}	R_{41}	R_{42}	R_{43}	R_{44}	R_{45}	R_{46}	V_{1} Ill. Hold	V_{2} Pa. Hold
R_{38}	R_{37}	R_{36}	R_{35}	R_{34}	R_{33}	R_{32}	R_{31}	R_{30}	R_{29}
R_{19}	R_{20}	R_{21}	R_{22}	R_{23}	R_{24}	R_{25}	R_{26}	R_{27}	R_{28}
R_{18}	R_{17}	R_{16}	R_{15}	R_{14}	R_{13}	R_{12}	R_{11}	R_{10}	R_{9}
		R_{1}	R_{2}	R_{3}	R_{4}	R_{5}	R_{6}	R_{7}	R_{8}

Key

D_{#}	Democratic
FL_{#}	Farmer–Labor
R_{#}	Republican

== Race summaries ==
=== Special elections during the 69th Congress ===
In these special elections, the winners were seated during 1926 or before March 4, 1927; ordered by election date.

State	Incumbent			Results	Candidates
State	Senator	Party	Electoral history	Results	Candidates
North Dakota (Class 3)	Gerald Nye	Republican	1926 (Appointed)	Interim appointee elected June 30, 1926. Winner was also elected to the next term, see below.	▌ ✓ Gerald Nye (Republican-NPL) 50.2%; ▌ L. B. Hanna (Republican) 37.5%; ▌ C. P. Stone (Independent Republican) 12.3%
Maine (Class 2)	Bert M. Fernald	Republican	1916 (special); 1918; 1924	Incumbent died August 23, 1926. New senator elected September 13, 1926. Republican hold.	▌ ✓ Arthur R. Gould (Republican) 71.8%; ▌Fulton J. Redman (Democratic) 28.2%
Iowa (Class 3)	David W. Stewart	Republican	1926 (Appointed)	Interim appointee elected November 2, 1926. Winner did not seek election to the next term, see below.	▌ ✓ David W. Stewart (Republican); Unopposed
Indiana (Class 1)	Arthur Raymond Robinson	Republican	1925 (Appointed)	Interim appointee elected November 2, 1926.	▌ ✓ Arthur Raymond Robinson (Republican) 50.6%; ▌Evans Woollen (Democratic) 48.4%; ▌Albert Stanley (Prohibition) 0.5%; ▌William O. Fogleson (Socialist) 0.5%
Massachusetts (Class 1)	William M. Butler	Republican	1924 (Appointed)	Interim appointee lost election. New senator elected November 2, 1926. Democratic gain.	▌ ✓ David I. Walsh (Democratic) 52.0%; ▌William M. Butler (Republican) 46.5%
Missouri (Class 3)	George H. Williams	Republican	1925 (Appointed)	Interim appointee lost election. New senator elected November 2, 1926. Democratic gain. Winner also elected to the next term, see below.	▌ ✓ Harry B. Hawes (Democratic) 52.1%; ▌George H. Williams (Republican) 47.9%

=== Elections leading to the 70th Congress ===
In these general elections, the winners were elected for the term beginning March 4, 1927; ordered by state.

All of the elections involved the Class 3 seats.

State	Incumbent			Results	Candidates
State	Senator	Party	Electoral history	Results	Candidates
Alabama	Oscar Underwood	Democratic	1914; 1920	Incumbent retired. New senator elected. Democratic hold.	▌ ✓ Hugo Black (Democratic) 80.9%; ▌E. H. Dryer (Republican) 19.1%
Arizona	Ralph H. Cameron	Republican	1920	Incumbent lost re-election. New senator elected. Democratic gain.	▌ ✓ Carl Hayden (Democratic) 58.3%; ▌Ralph H. Cameron (Republican) 41.7%
Arkansas	Thaddeus H. Caraway	Democratic	1920	Incumbent re-elected.	▌ ✓ Thaddeus H. Caraway (Democratic) 82.8%; ▌R. A. Jones (Republican) 17.2%
California	Samuel M. Shortridge	Republican	1920	Incumbent re-elected.	▌ ✓ Samuel M. Shortridge (Republican) 63.1%; ▌John B. Elliott (Democratic) 36.9%
Colorado	Rice W. Means	Republican	1924 (special)	Incumbent lost renomination. New senator elected. Republican hold.	▌ ✓ Charles W. Waterman (Republican) 50.3%; ▌William E. Sweet (Democratic) 46.4%
Connecticut	Hiram Bingham III	Republican	1924 (special)	Incumbent re-elected.	▌ ✓ Hiram Bingham III (Republican) 63.3%; ▌Rollin U. Tyler (Democratic) 35.6%
Florida	Duncan U. Fletcher	Democratic	1908; 1914; 1920	Incumbent re-elected.	▌ ✓ Duncan U. Fletcher (Democratic) 77.9%; ▌John M. Lindsay (Independent) 12.8%
Georgia	Walter F. George	Democratic	1922 (special)	Incumbent re-elected.	▌ ✓ Walter F. George (Democratic); Unopposed
Idaho	Frank R. Gooding	Republican	1920	Incumbent re-elected.	▌ ✓ Frank R. Gooding (Republican) 45.4%; ▌H. F. Samuels (Progressive) 29.6%; ▌John F. Nugent (Democratic) 25.0%
Illinois	William B. McKinley	Republican	1920	Incumbent lost renomination, then died. New senator elected. Winner appointed to finish term, but was not seated for either appointment or for next term. (Note: Frank L. Smith defeated William B. McKinley for the 1926 Republican nomination in Illinois and won the subsequent general election. McKinley died shortly before the end of his term, so Smith was appointed to replace him. When Smith presented his credentials to serve the remainder of McKinely's term, the Senate refused to seat him based on what it saw as an election rife with fraud and corruption. When Smith returned with his credentials for the term he was elected to, the Senate again refused to seat him for the same reasons. Smith and the Governor considered him to be the rightful senator, but he resigned February 9, 1928.); Republican hold, although the Senate did not consider the winner to be a senator.	▌ ✓ Frank L. Smith (Republican) 46.9%; ▌George E. Brennan (Democratic) 43.1%; ▌Hugh S. Magill (Independent) 8.7%
Indiana	James E. Watson	Republican	1916 (special); 1920	Incumbent re-elected.	▌ ✓ James E. Watson (Republican) 50.0%; ▌Albert Stump (Democratic) 48.9%; ▌William H. Harris (Prohibition) 0.5%; ▌Forrest Wallace (Socialist) 0.5%
Iowa	David W. Stewart	Republican	1926 (Appointed)	Interim appointee retired. New senator elected. Republican hold. Winner did not run to finish the term, see above.	▌ ✓ Smith W. Brookhart (Republican) 56.6%; ▌Claude R. Porter (Democratic) 43.4%
Kansas	Charles Curtis	Republican	1914; 1920	Incumbent re-elected.	▌ ✓ Charles Curtis (Republican), 63.6%; ▌Charles Stephens (Democratic) 34.7%; ▌M. L. Phillips (Socialist) 1.7%
Kentucky	Richard P. Ernst	Republican	1920	Incumbent lost re-election. New senator elected. Democratic gain.	▌ ✓ Alben W. Barkley (Democratic) 51.8%; ▌Richard P. Ernst (Republican) 48.2%
Louisiana	Edwin S. Broussard	Democratic	1920	Incumbent re-elected.	▌ ✓ Edwin S. Broussard (Democratic); Unopposed
Maryland	Ovington Weller	Republican	1920	Incumbent lost re-election. New senator elected. Democratic gain.	▌ ✓ Millard Tydings (Democratic) 57.5%; ▌Ovington Weller (Republican) 41.4%; ▌William A. Toole (Socialist) 1.1%
Missouri	George H. Williams	Republican	1925 (Appointed)	Incumbent appointee lost election. Winner also elected to finish the current term; see above. New senator elected. Democratic gain.	▌ ✓ Harry B. Hawes (Democratic) 51.3%; ▌George H. Williams (Republican) 47.7%
Nevada	Tasker Oddie	Republican	1920	Incumbent re-elected.	▌ ✓ Tasker Oddie (Republican), 55.8%; ▌Raymond T. Baker (Democratic) 42.5%
New Hampshire	George H. Moses	Republican	1918 (special); 1920	Incumbent re-elected.	▌ ✓ George H. Moses (Republican), 62.3%; ▌Robert C. Murchie (Democratic) 37.7%
New York	James Wadsworth	Republican	1914; 1920	Incumbent lost re-election. New senator elected. Democratic gain.	▌ ✓ Robert F. Wagner (Democratic) 46.5%; ▌James Wadsworth (Republican) 42.4%; ▌Franklin W. Cristman (Ind. Republican) 8.2%
North Carolina	Lee S. Overman	Democratic	1903; 1909; 1914; 1920	Incumbent re-elected.	▌ ✓ Lee S. Overman (Democratic), 60.5%; ▌Johnson Jay Hayes (Republican) 39.5%
North Dakota	Gerald Nye	Republican	1925 (Appointed); 1926 (special)	Incumbent re-elected.	▌ ✓ Gerald Nye (Republican), 69.6%; ▌Norris H. Nelson (Independent) 12.2%; ▌F. F. Burchard (Democratic) 8.7%; ▌C. P. Stone (Independent) 6.3%
Ohio	Frank B. Willis	Republican	1920	Incumbent re-elected.	▌ ✓ Frank B. Willis (Republican), 53.2%; ▌Atlee Pomerene (Democratic) 46.6%
Oklahoma	John W. Harreld	Republican	1920	Incumbent lost re-election. New senator elected. Democratic gain.	▌ ✓ Elmer Thomas (Democratic) 54.8%; ▌John W. Harreld (Republican) 44.7%
Oregon	Robert N. Stanfield	Republican	1920	Incumbent lost renomination, then ran as an independent but lost re-election. New senator elected. Republican hold.	▌ ✓ Frederick Steiwer (Republican) 39.8%; ▌Bert E. Haney (Democratic) 36.3%; ▌Robert N. Stanfield (Independent) 22.5%
Pennsylvania	George W. Pepper	Republican	1922 (Appointed); 1922 (special)	Incumbent lost renomination. New senator elected. Senate refused to qualify winner due to charges of corruption and fraud concerning the election. Republican hold, but the Senate would later unseat the winner and declare the seat vacant.	▌ ✓ William S. Vare (Republican) 54.6%; ▌William B. Wilson (Democratic) 43.1%
South Carolina	Ellison D. Smith	Democratic	1908; 1914; 1920	Incumbent re-elected.	▌ ✓ Ellison D. Smith (Democratic); Unopposed
South Dakota	Peter Norbeck	Republican	1920	Incumbent re-elected.	▌ ✓ Peter Norbeck (Republican), 59.5%; ▌C. J. Gunderson (Democratic) 33.3%; ▌Howard Platt (Independent) 7.2%
Utah	Reed Smoot	Republican	1903; 1909; 1914; 1920	Incumbent re-elected.	▌ ✓ Reed Smoot (Republican), 61.5%; ▌Ashby Snow (Democratic) 37.6%
Vermont	Porter H. Dale	Republican	1923 (special)	Incumbent re-elected.	▌ ✓ Porter H. Dale (Republican), 73.4%; ▌James E. Kennedy (Democratic) 26.5%
Washington	Wesley L. Jones	Republican	1909; 1914; 1920	Incumbent re-elected.	▌ ✓ Wesley L. Jones (Republican), 51.3%; ▌A. Scott Bullitt (Democratic) 46.5%
Wisconsin	Irvine Lenroot	Republican	1920	Incumbent lost renomination. New senator elected. Republican hold.	▌ ✓ John J. Blaine (Republican) 55.0%; ▌Charles D. Rosa (Independent) 20.3%; ▌Thomas M. Kearney (Democratic) 12.2%; ▌Leo Krzycki (Socialist) 5.7%

== Closest races ==
Twelve races had a margin of victory under 10%:

State	Party of winner	Margin
Indiana (regular)	Republican	1.1%
Indiana (special)	Republican	2.2%
Oregon	Republican	3.5% (Note: Oregon was the "tipping point" state.)
Missouri	Democratic (flip)	3.6%
Kentucky	Democratic (flip)	3.6%
Illinois	Republican	3.8%
Colorado	Republican	3.9%
New York	Democratic (flip)	4.1%
Missouri	Democratic (flip)	4.2%
Washington	Republican	4.8%
Massachusetts	Democratic (flip)	5.5%
Ohio	Republican	6.6%

== Alabama ==
1926 United States Senate election in Alabama
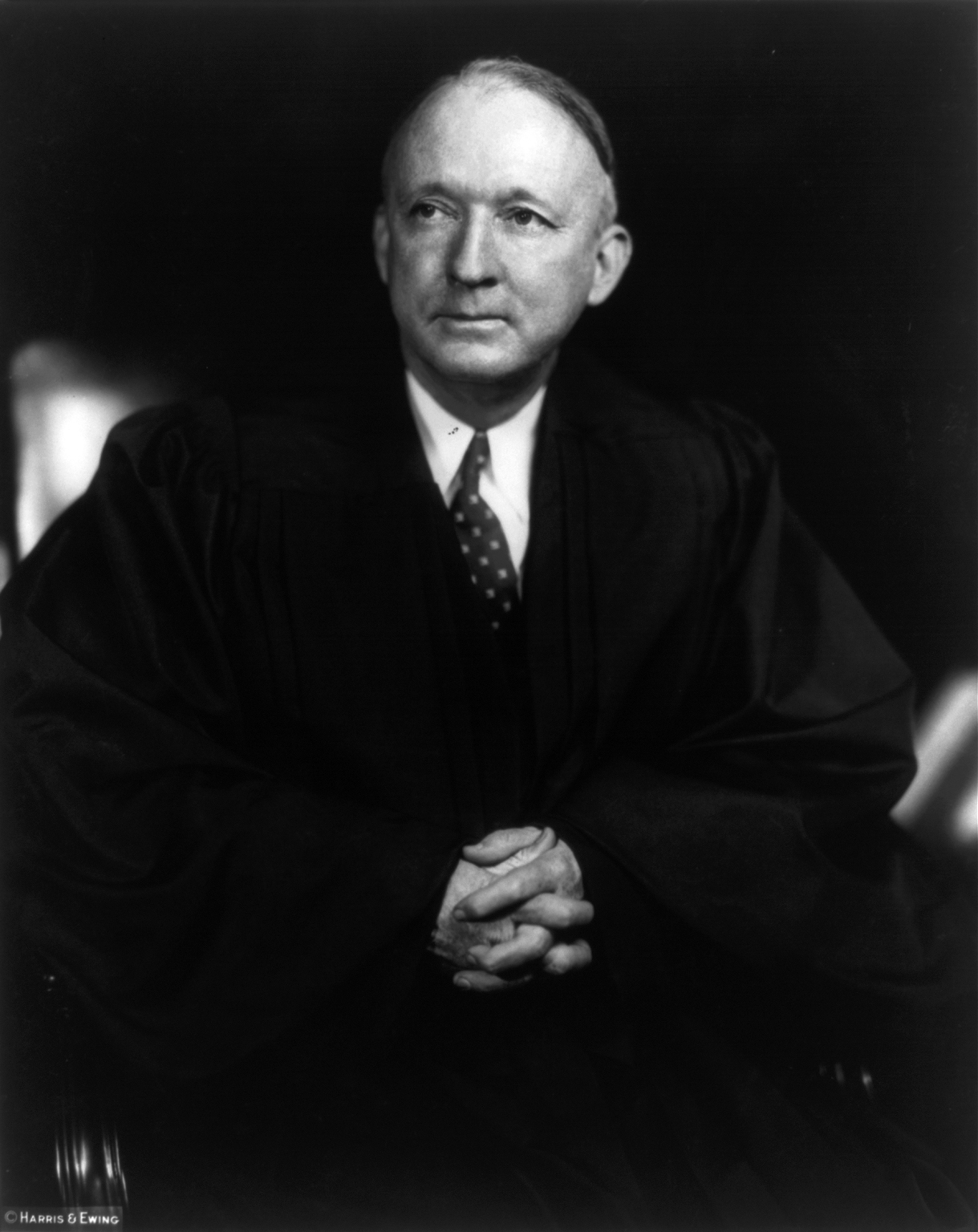

Nominee	Hugo Black	Edmund H. Dryer
Party	Democratic	Republican
Popular vote	91,801	21,712
Percentage	80.87%	19.13%
- County results Black: 50–60% 60–70% 70–80% 80–90% >90% Dryer: 50–60%
U.S. senator before election
Oscar Underwood
Democratic
Elected U.S. senator
Hugo Black
Democratic

Alabama election
Party	Candidate	Votes	%
Democratic	Hugo Black	91,801	80.87%
Republican	Edmund H. Dryer	21,712	19.13%
Majority		70,089	61.74%
Turnout		113,513	
Democratic hold			

== Arizona ==
1926 United States Senate election in Arizona
- November 3, 1926
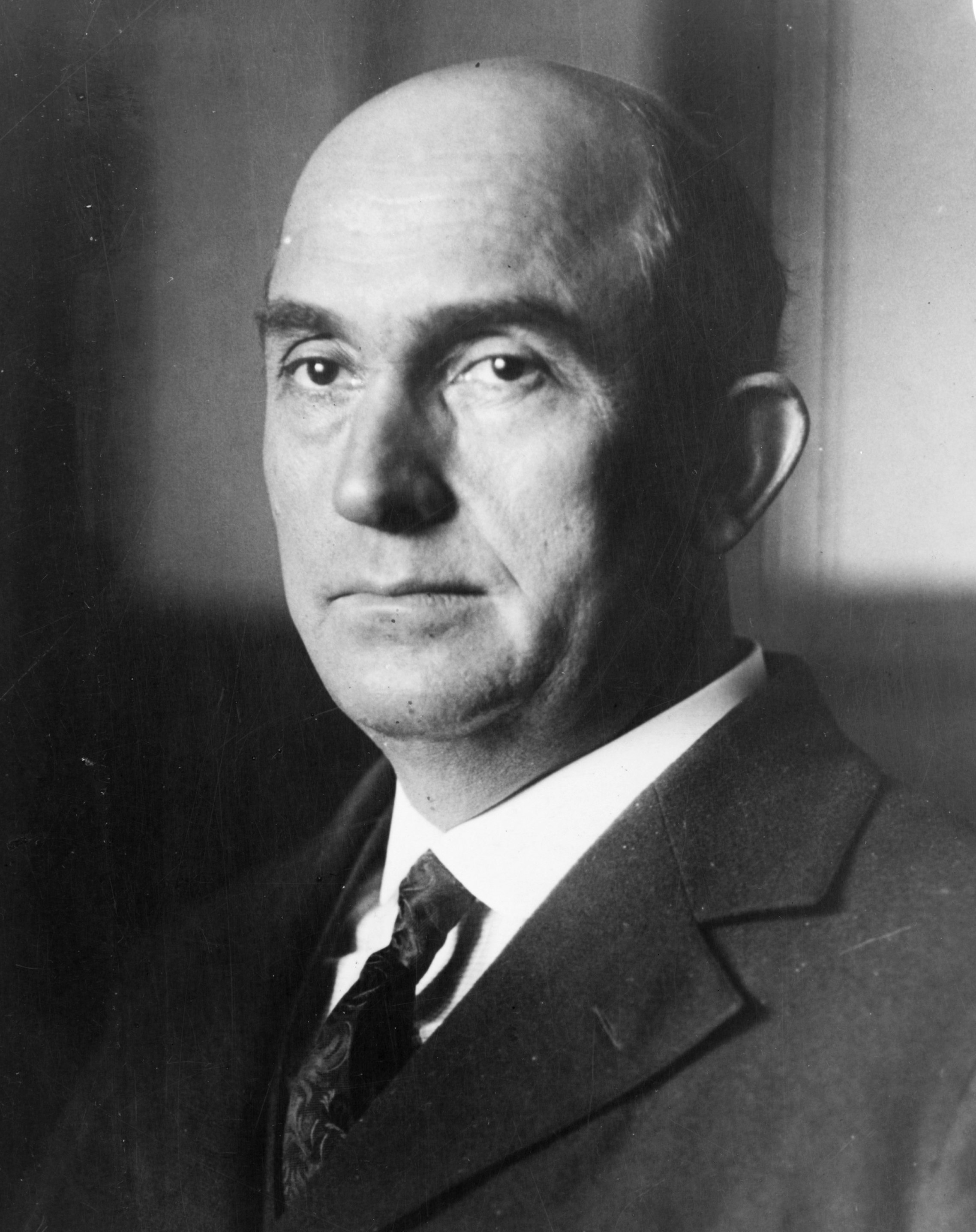

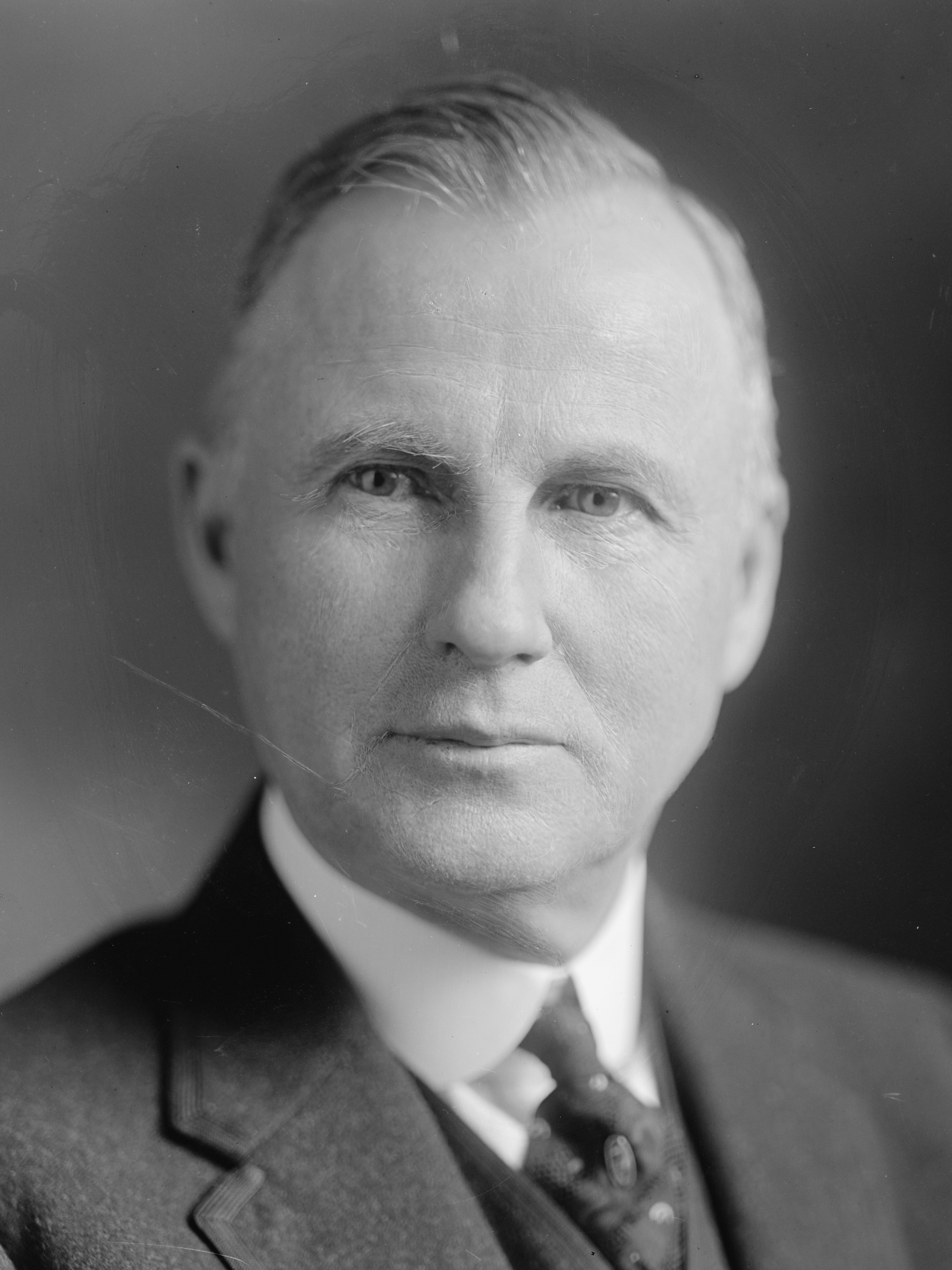
Nominee	Carl Hayden	Ralph H. Cameron
Party	Democratic	Republican
Popular vote	44,591	31,845
Percentage	58.34%	41.66%
- County results Hayden: 50–60% 60–70% 70–80% Cameron: 50–60%
U.S. senator before election
Ralph H. Cameron
Republican
Elected U.S. Senator
Carl Hayden
Democratic

Arizona election
Party	Candidate	Votes	%
Democratic	Carl Hayden	44,591 (Note: The House Clerk erroneously listed Hayden's vote total as 44,951 in their report.)	58.34%
Republican	Ralph H. Cameron (incumbent)	31,845	41.47%
Majority		12,746	16.68%
Turnout		76,436	
Democratic gain from Republican			

== Arkansas ==
1926 United States Senate election in Arkansas
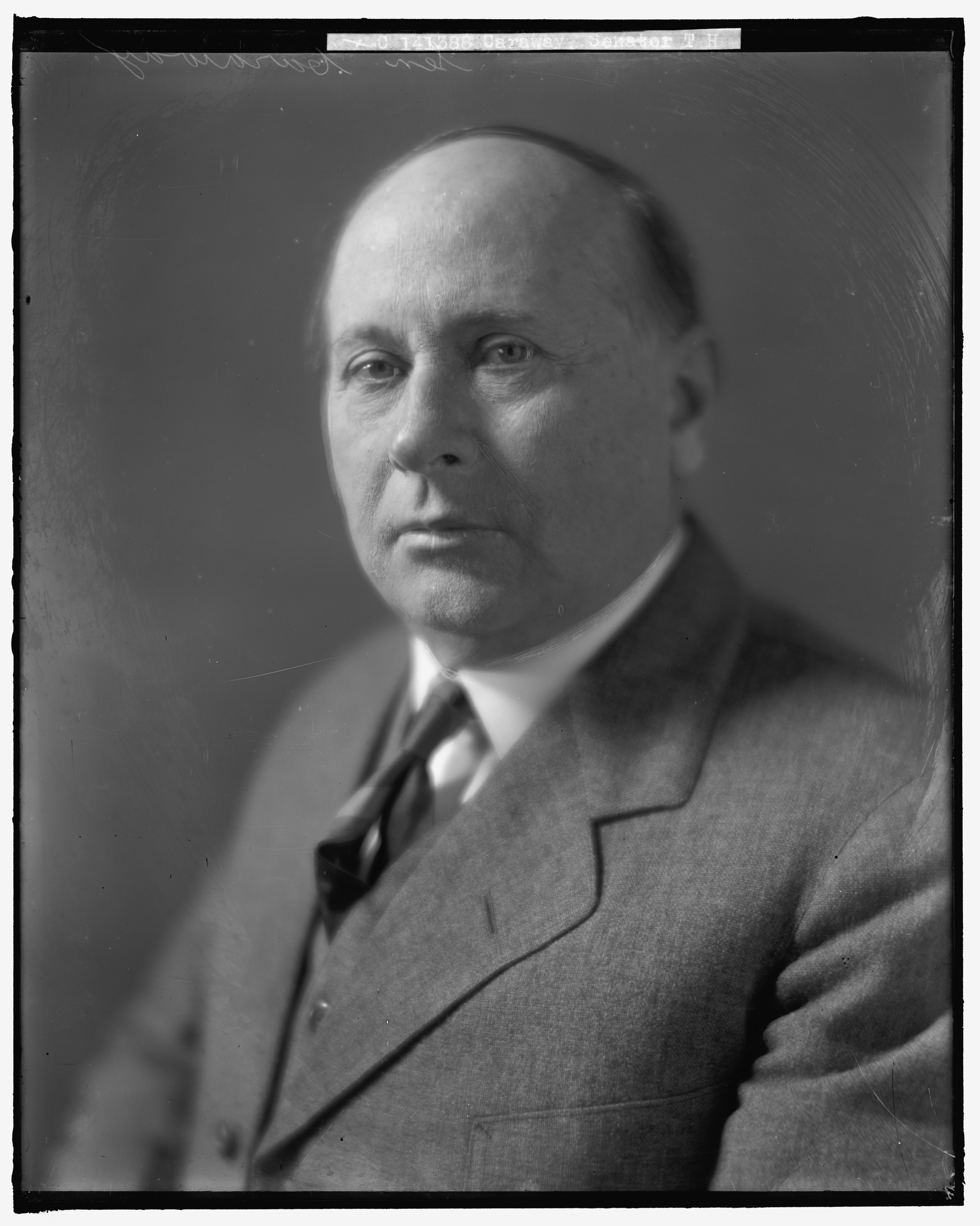

Nominee	Thaddeus H. Caraway	Robert A. Jones
Party	Democratic	Republican
Popular vote	28,166	5,048
Percentage	84.80%	15.20%
- County results Caraway: 50–60% 60–70% 70–80% 80–90% 90–100% Jones: 50–60% No Vote/Data
U.S. senator before election
Thaddeus H. Caraway
Democratic
Elected U.S. senator
Thaddeus H. Caraway
Democratic

Arkansas election
Party	Candidate	Votes	%
Democratic	Thaddeus H. Caraway (incumbent)	28,166	84.80%
Republican	Robert A. Jones	5,048	15.20%
Majority		23,118	69.60%
Turnout		33,214	
Democratic hold			

== California ==
1926 United States Senate election in California
- November 2, 1926
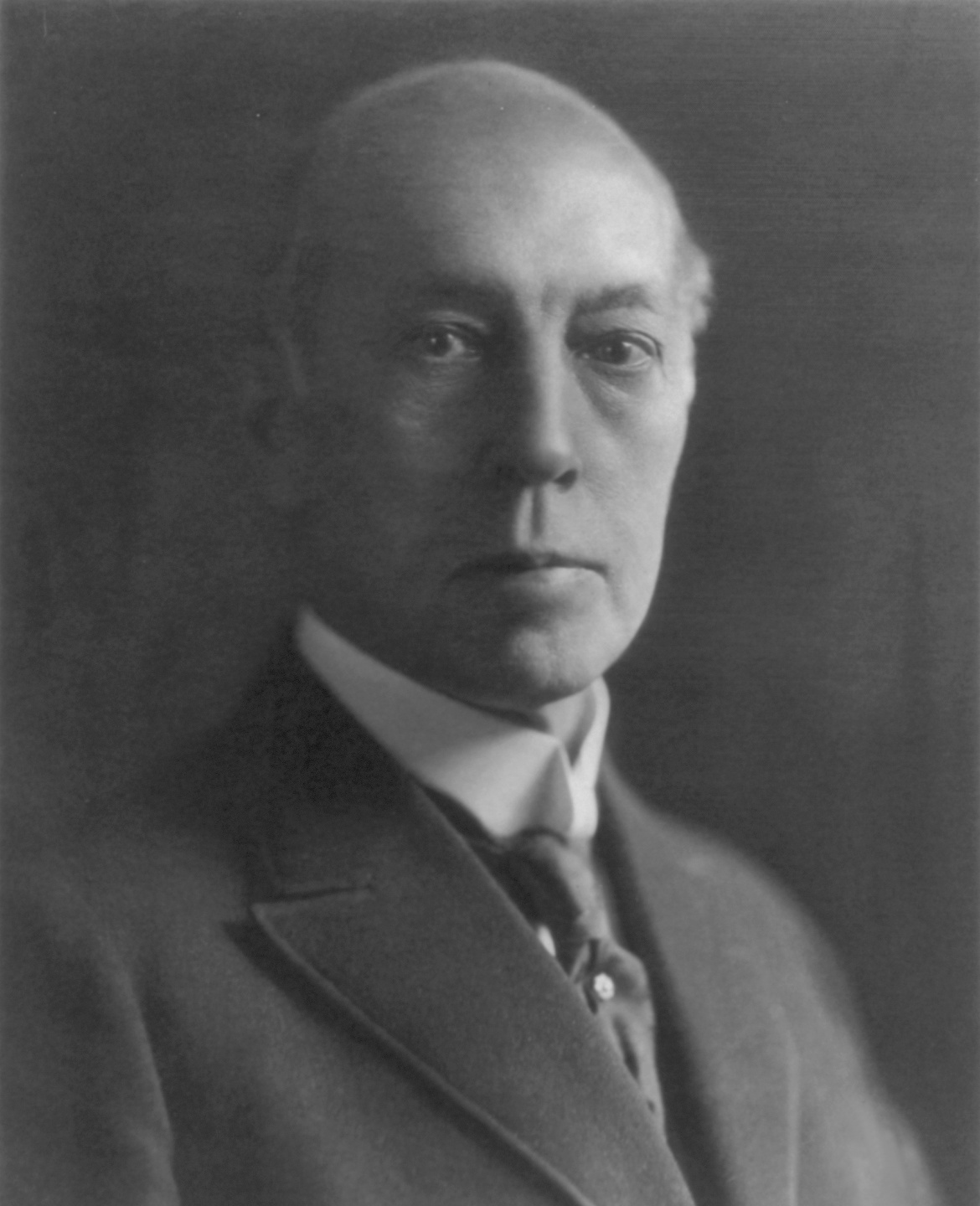

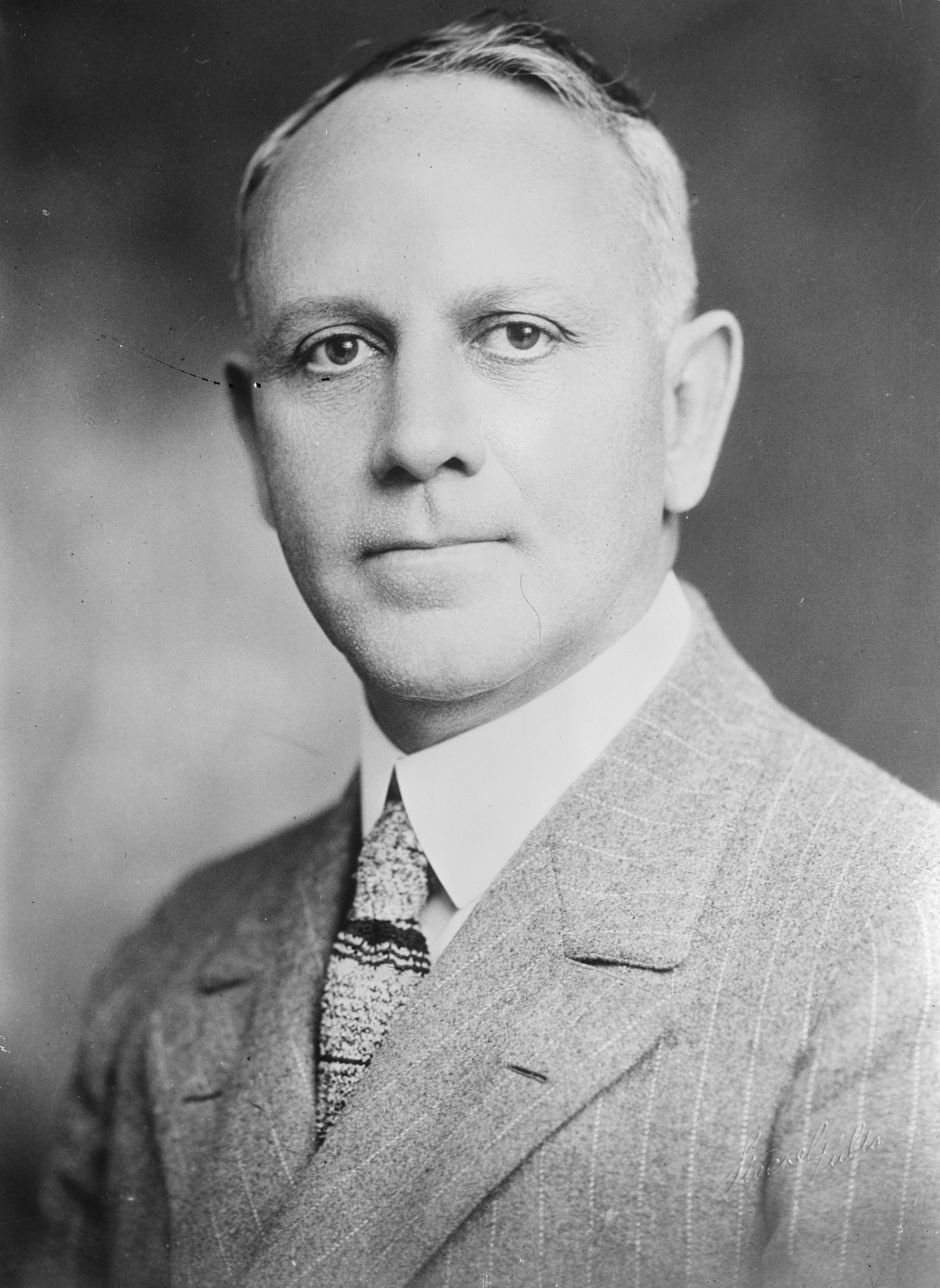
Nominee	Samuel Morgan Shortridge	John B. Elliott
Party	Republican	Democratic
Popular vote	670,128	391,599
Percentage	63.12%	36.88%
- County results Shortridge: 50–60% 60–70% 70–80% 80–90% >90%
U.S. senator before election
Samuel Morgan Shortridge
Republican
Elected U.S. Senator
Samuel Morgan Shortridge
Republican

California election
Party	Candidate	Votes	%
Republican	Samuel M. Shortridge (incumbent)	670,128	63.11%
Democratic	John B. Elliott	391,599	36.88%
None	Scattering	127	0.01%
Majority		278,529	26.23%
Turnout		1,061,854	
Republican hold			

== Colorado ==
1926 United States Senate election in Colorado
- November 2, 1926
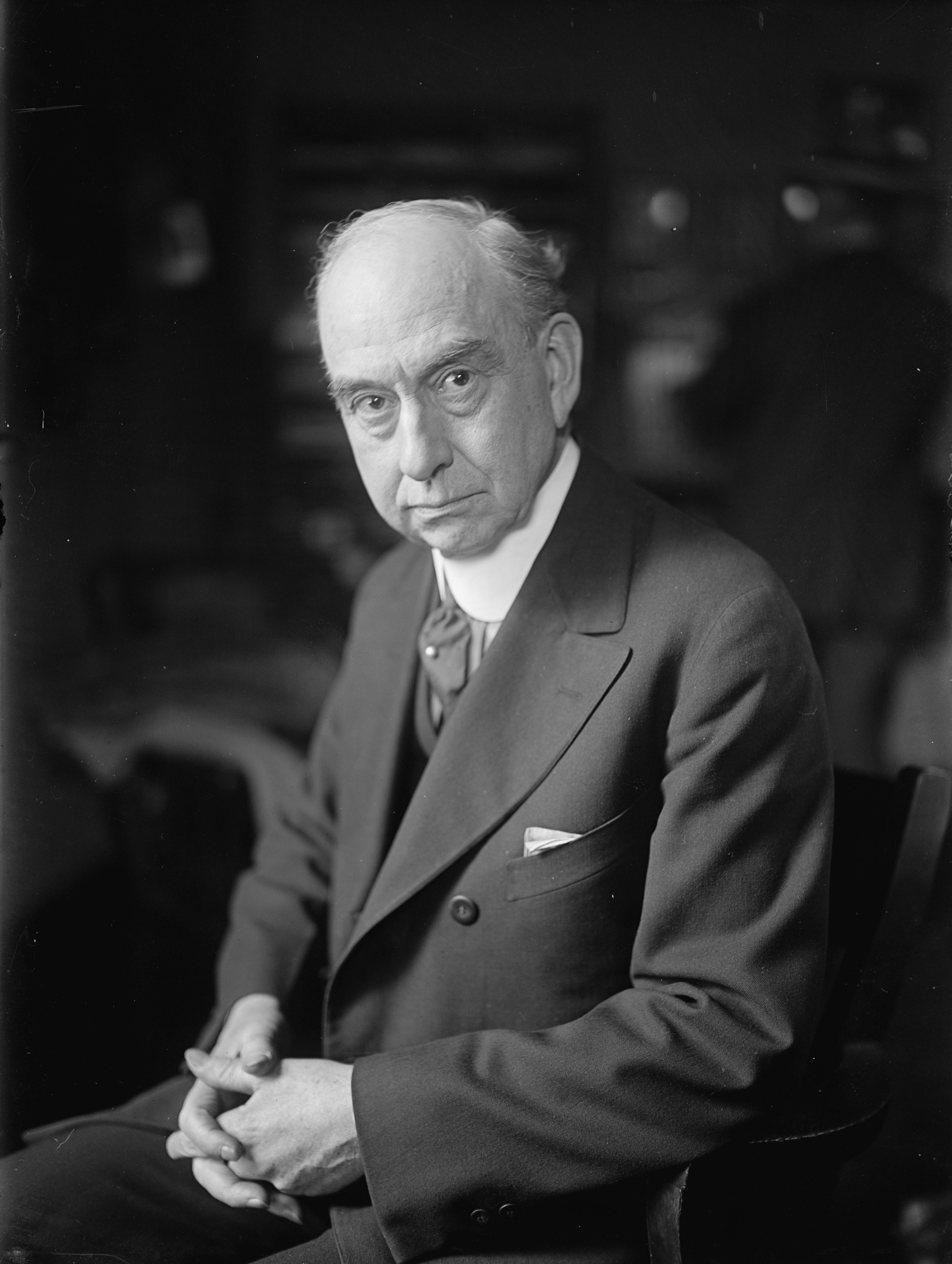

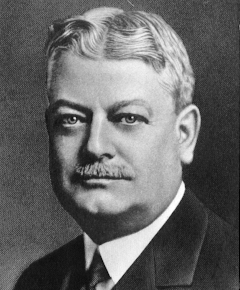
Nominee	Charles W. Waterman	William Ellery Sweet
Party	Republican	Democratic
Popular vote	149,585	138,113
Percentage	50.25%	46.39%
- Results by county Waterman: 40–50% 50–60% 60–70% Sweet: 40–50% 50–60% 60–70%
U.S. senator before election
Rice W. Means
Republican
Elected U.S. Senator
Charles W. Waterman
Republican

Colorado election
Party	Candidate	Votes	%
Republican	Charles W. Waterman	149,585	50.25%
Democratic	William E. Sweet	138,113	46.39%
Farmer–Labor	Morton Alexander	5,829	1.96%
Socialist	Frank H. Rice	2,218	0.75%
Peoples Constitutional Rights	James A. Ownbey	1,091	0.37%
Workers (Communist)	James A. Ayres	859	0.29%
Majority		11,472	3.86%
Turnout		297,695	
Republican hold			

== Connecticut ==
1926 United States Senate election in Connecticut
- November 2, 1926
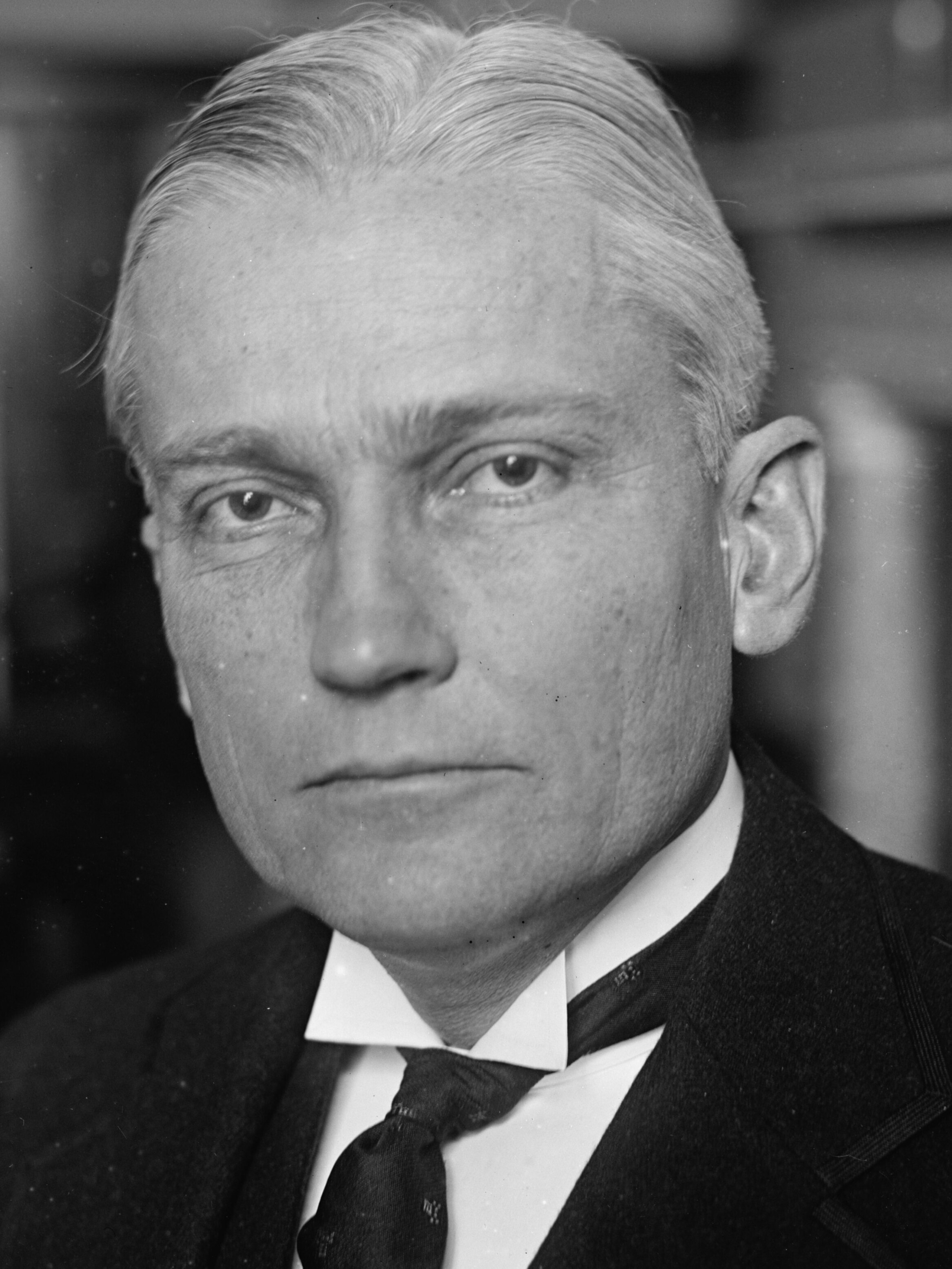

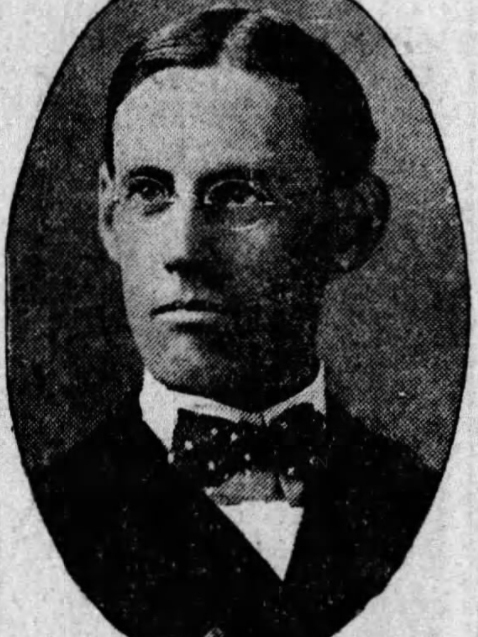
Nominee	Hiram Bingham III	Rollin Tyler
Party	Republican	Democratic
Popular vote	191,401	107,753
Percentage	63.31%	35.64%
- Bingham: 50–60% 60–70% 70–80% 80–90% 90–100% Tyler: 50–60% Tie: 50% No Data/Vote
U.S. senator before election
Hiram Bingham III
Republican
Elected U.S. Senator
Hiram Bingham III
Republican

Connecticut election
Party	Candidate	Votes	%
Republican	Hiram Bingham III (incumbent)	191,401	63.31%
Democratic	Rollin U. Tyler	107,753	35.64%
Independent	Rice	3,173	1.05%
Majority		83,648	27.67%
Turnout		302,327	
Republican hold			

== Florida ==
1926 United States Senate election in Florida
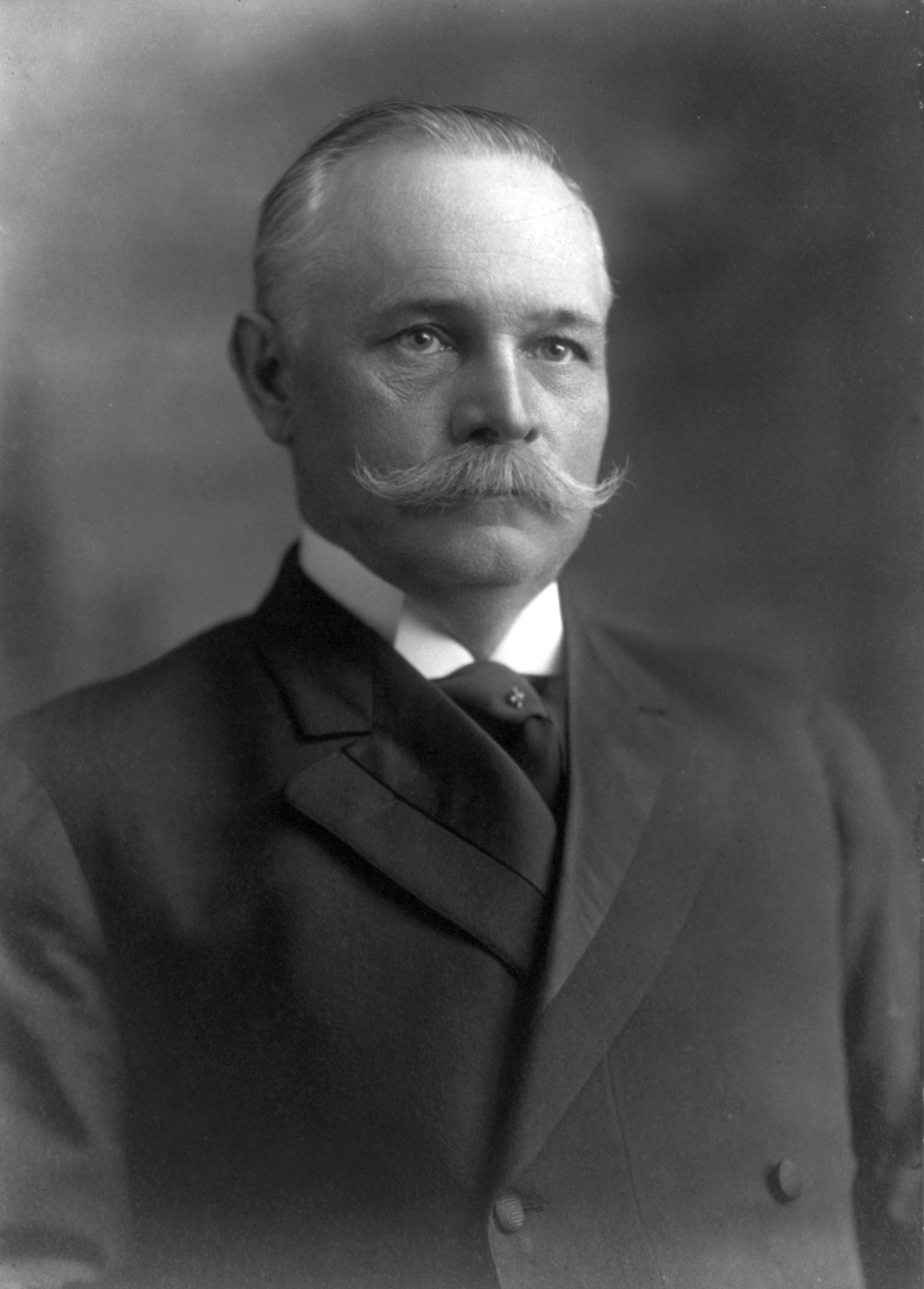

Nominee	Duncan U. Fletcher	John M. Lindsay	W. R. O’Neal
Party	Democratic	Republican	Republican
Popular vote	51,054	8,381	6,133
Percentage	77.86%	12.78%	9.35%
- County results Fletcher: 50–60% 60–70% 70–80% 80–90% 90–100% Lindsay: 40–50%
U.S. senator before election
Duncan U. Fletcher
Democratic
Elected U.S. senator
Duncan U. Fletcher
Democratic

Florida election
Party	Candidate	Votes	%
Democratic	Duncan U. Fletcher (incumbent)	51,054	77.86%
Republican	John M. Lindsay (delegate convention)	8,381	12.78%
Republican	W. R. O’Neal	6,133	9.35%
Majority		42,673	65.08%
Turnout		65,568	
Democratic hold			

== Georgia ==
1926 United States Senate election in Georgia
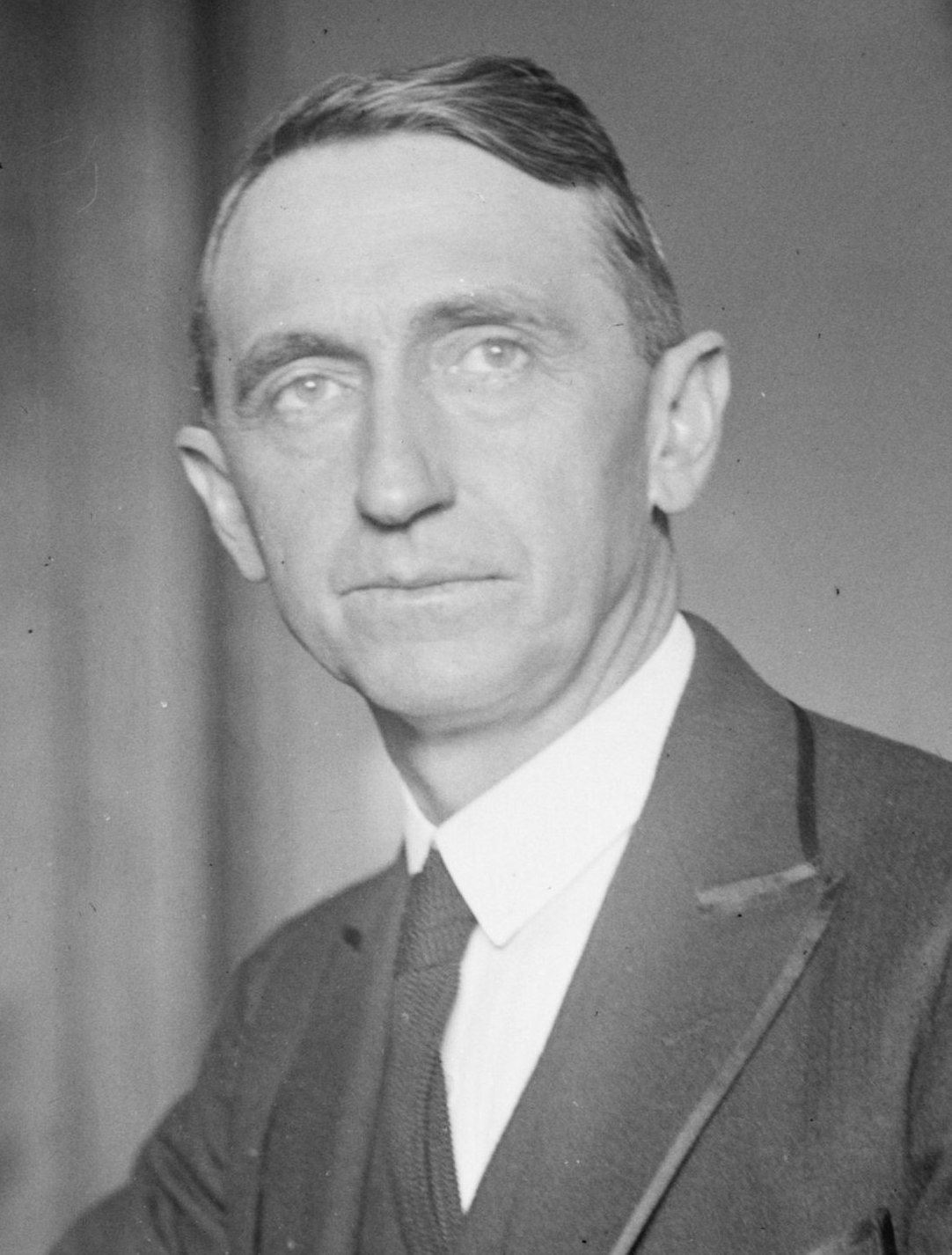

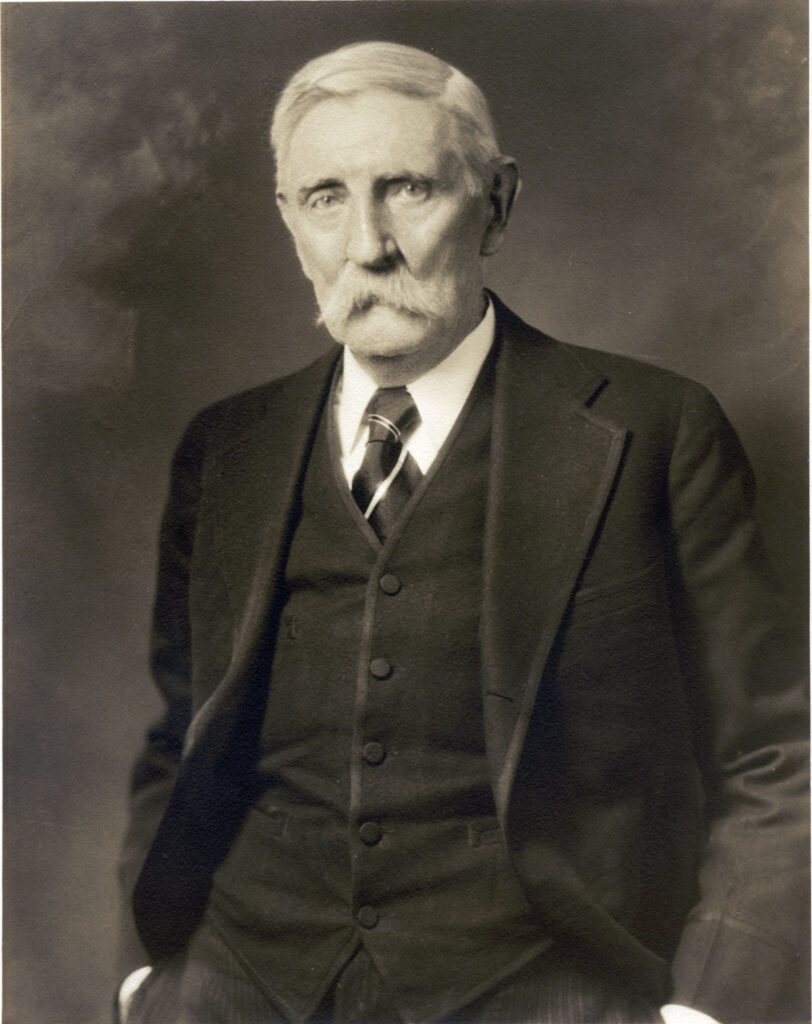
Nominee	Walter F. George	Richard Russell Sr.
Party	Democratic	Democratic
Electoral vote	382	32
Popular vote	128,179	61,911
Percentage	67.43%	32.57%
- County results George: 50–60% 60–70% 70–80% 80–90% >90% Russell: 50–60% 60–70% 70–80%
U.S. senator before election
Walter F. George
Democratic
Elected U.S. senator
Walter F. George
Democratic

Primary Election
Party	Candidate	Votes	%
Democratic	Walter F. George (incumbent)	128,179	67.43%
Democratic	Richard Russell Sr.	61,911	32.57%
Total votes		190,090	100.00%

General election
Party	Candidate	Votes	%
Democratic	Walter F. George (incumbent)	47,366	100.00%
Democratic hold			

== Idaho ==
1926 United States Senate election in Idaho
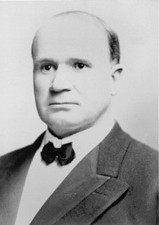

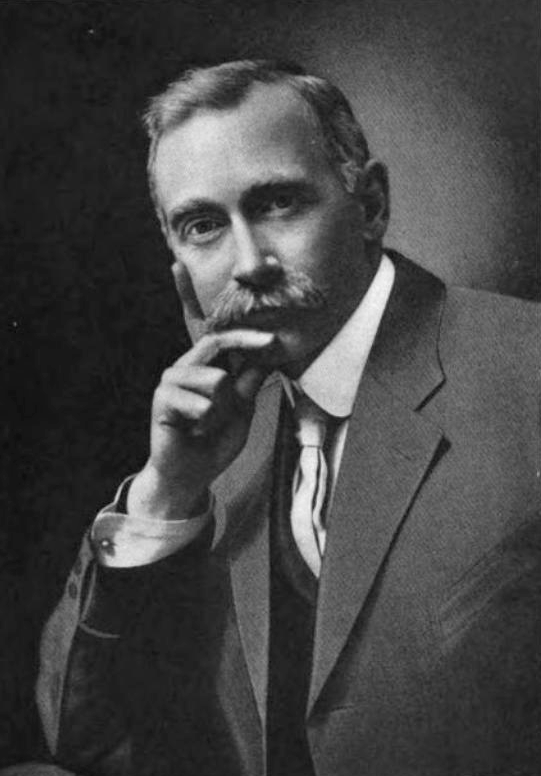

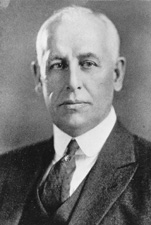
Nominee	Frank R. Gooding	H. F. Samuels	John F. Nugent
Party	Republican	Progressive Party (United States, 1924–34)	Democratic
Popular vote	56,847	37,047	31,285
Percentage	45.41%	29.60%	24.99%
- County results Gooding: 30–40% 40–50% 50–60% 60–70% 70–80% Samuels: 30–40% 40–50% Nugent: 30–40% 40–50% 50–60% Tie: 40–50%
U.S. senator before election
Frank R. Gooding
Republican
Elected U.S. senator
Frank R. Gooding
Republican

Idaho election
Party	Candidate	Votes	%
Republican	Frank R. Gooding (incumbent)	56,847	45.41%
Progressive Party (US, 1924)	H. F. Samuels	37,047	29.60%
Democratic	John F. Nugent	31,285	24.99%
Majority		19,800	15.81%
Turnout		125,179	
Republican hold			

== Illinois ==
1926 United States Senate election in Illinois
- November 2, 1926
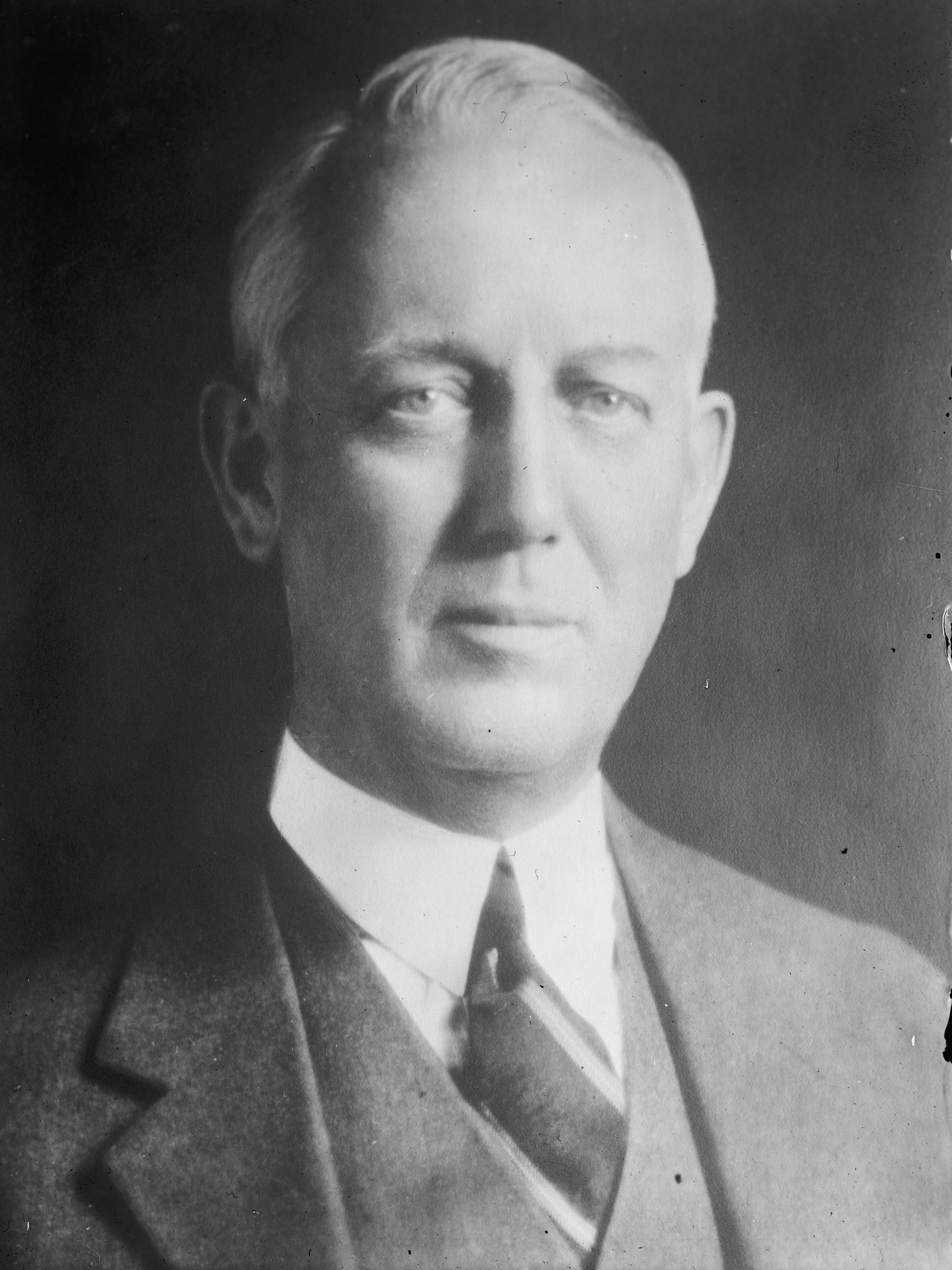

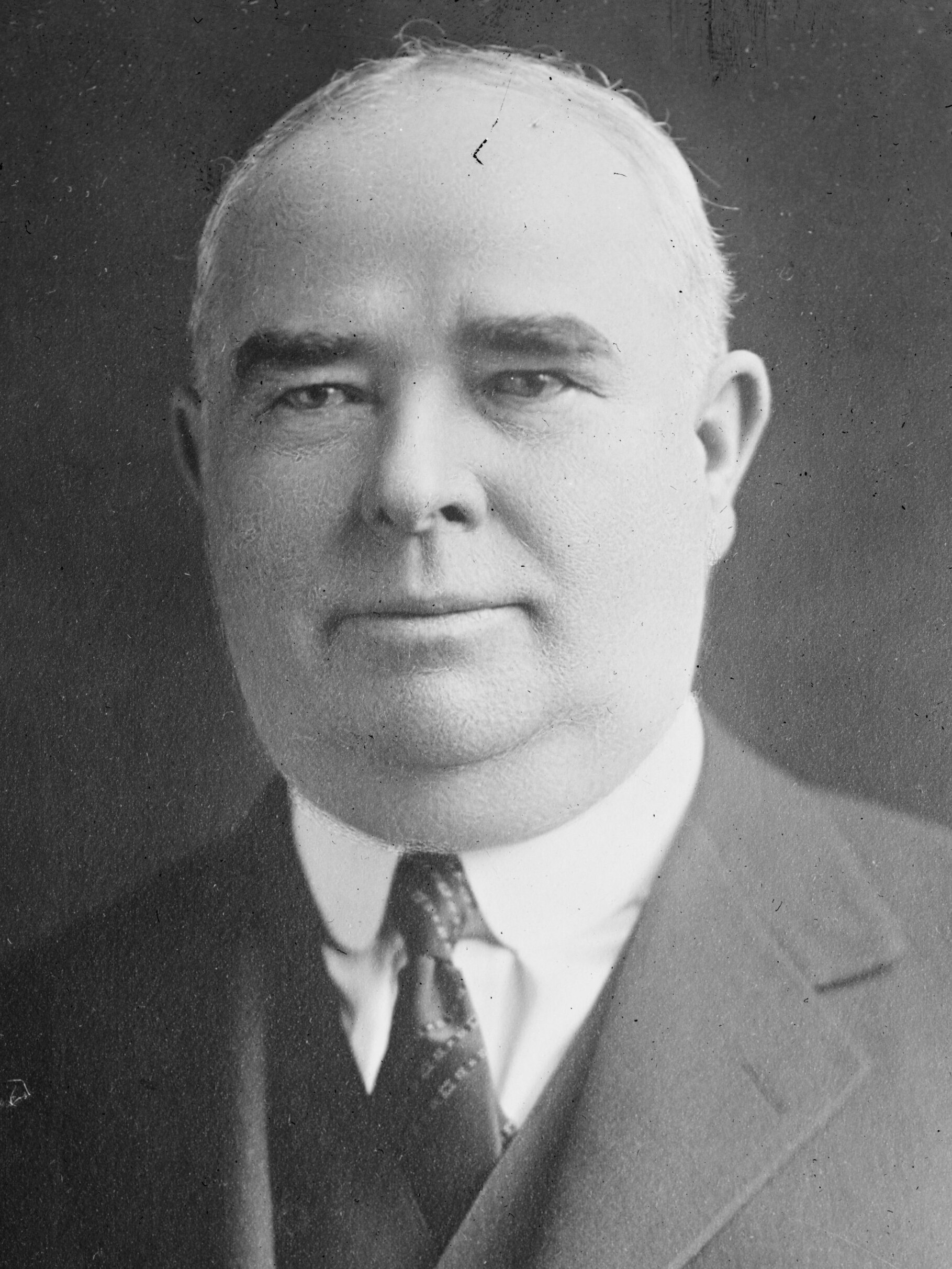

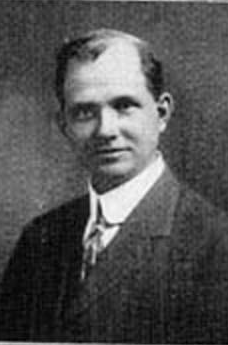
Nominee	Frank L. Smith	George E. Brennan	Hugh S. McGill
Party	Republican	Democratic	Independent
Popular vote	842,273	774,943	156,245
Percentage	46.86%	43.12%	8.69%
- Results by county Smith: 30–40% 40–50% 50–60% 60–70% 70–80% Brennan: 40–50% 50–60% 60–70%
U.S. senator before election
William B. McKinley
Republican
Elected U.S. senator
Frank L. Smith
Republican

Illinois election
Party	Candidate	Votes	%
Republican	Frank L. Smith	842,273	46.86%
Democratic	George E. Brennan	774,943	43.12%
Independent	Hugh S. Magill	156,245	8.69%
Progressive Party (US, 1924)	Parley P. Christensen	6,526	0.36%
Light Wines and Beer	Raymond T. O’Keefe	4,596	0.26%
Independent Democratic	James H. Kirby	4,203	0.23%
Socialist	John T. Whitlock	2,998	0.17%
Socialist Labor	G. A. Jenning	1,977	0.11%
Workers (Communist)	J. Louis Engdahl	1,309	0.07%
High Life	James A. Logan	1,161	0.06%
Independent	Samuel C. Irving	701	0.04%
Commonwealth Land	Morris Lynchenheim	427	0.02%
Majority		67,330	3.74%
Turnout		1,797,359	
Republican hold			

== Indiana ==
There were two elections in Indiana due to the October 14, 1925 death of Democrat Samuel M. Ralston.

=== Indiana (special) ===
1926 United States Senate special election in Indiana
- November 2, 1926
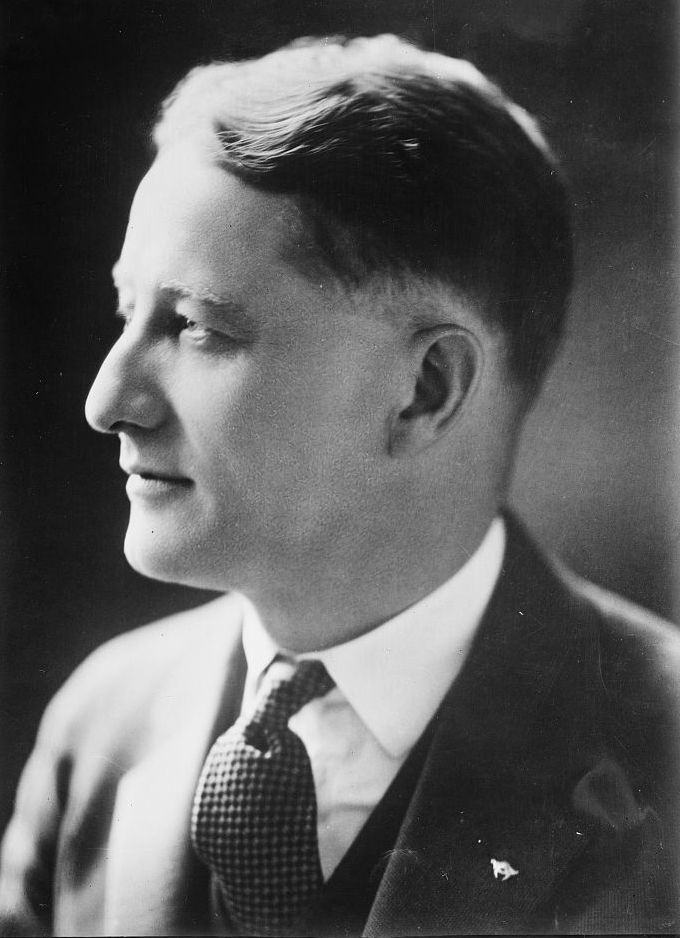

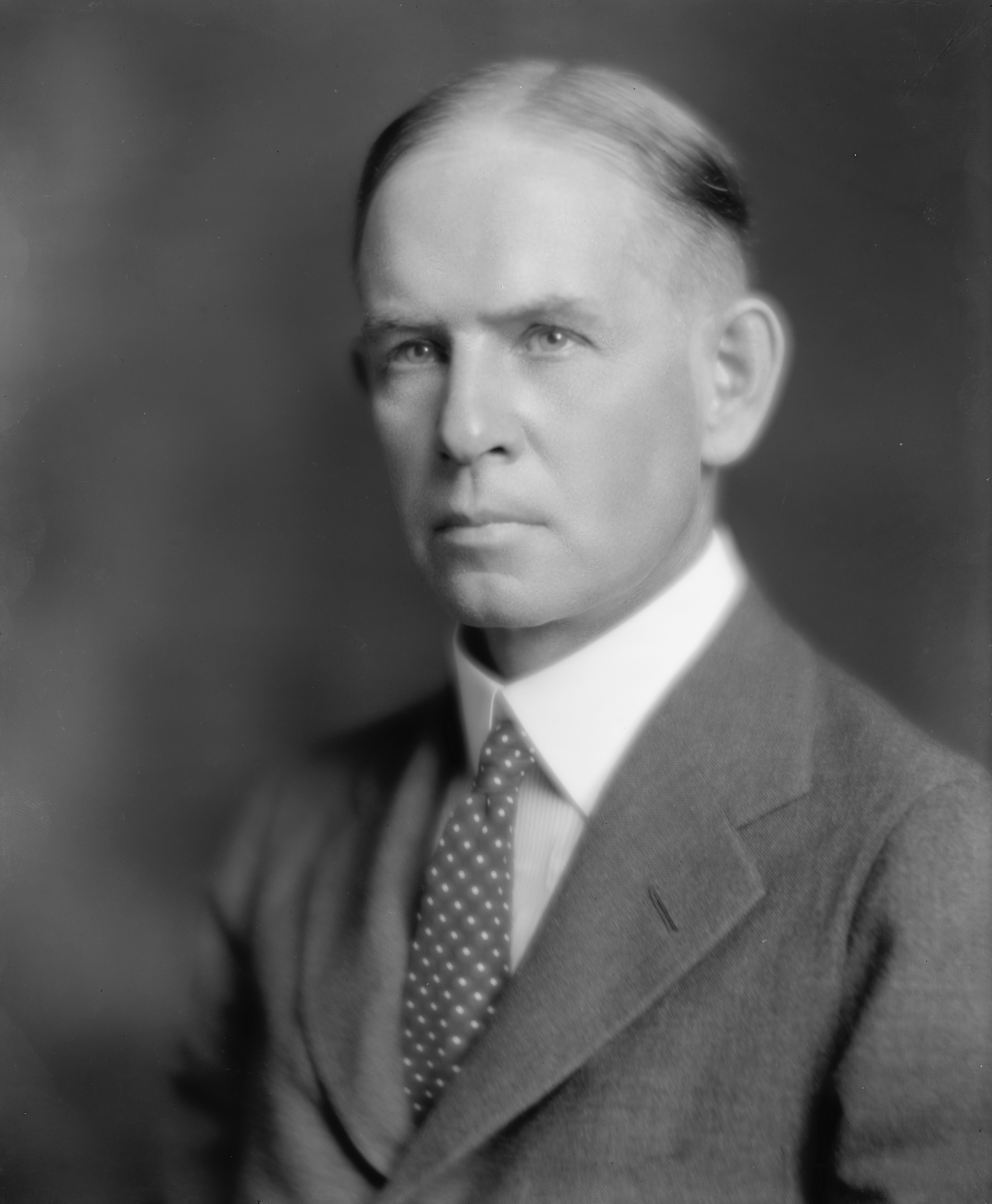
Nominee	Arthur Robinson	Evans Woollen
Party	Republican	Democratic
Popular vote	519,401	496,540
Percentage	50.62%	48.40%
- County results Robinson: 40–50% 50–60% 60–70% 70–80% Woollen: 40–50% 50–60% 60–70%
U.S. senator before election
Arthur Raymond Robinson
Republican
Elected U.S. Senator
Arthur Raymond Robinson
Republican

Republican Arthur Raymond Robinson was appointed to continue Ralston's term, pending the special election, which he then won.

Indiana special election
Party	Candidate	Votes	%
Republican	Arthur Raymond Robinson (incumbent)	519,401	50.62%
Democratic	Evans Woollen	496,540	48.40%
Prohibition	Albert Stanley	5,205	0.51%
Socialist	William O. Fogleson	4,864	0.47%
Majority		22,861	2.22%
Turnout		1,026,010	
Republican hold			

=== Indiana (regular) ===
1926 United States Senate election in Indiana
- November 2, 1926
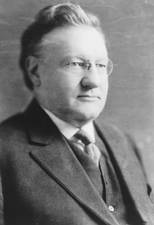

Nominee	James E. Watson	Albert Stump
Party	Republican	Democratic
Popular vote	522,837	511,454
Percentage	50.04%	48.95%
- County results Watson: 40–50% 50–60% 60–70% 70–80% Stump: 40–50% 50–60% 60–70%
U.S. senator before election
James E. Watson
Republican
Elected U.S. Senator
James E. Watson
Republican

Indiana general election
Party	Candidate	Votes	%
Republican	James E. Watson (incumbent)	522,837	50.04%
Democratic	Albert Stump	511,454	48.95%
Prohibition	William H. Harris	5,420	0.52%
Socialist	Forrest Wallace	5,106	0.49%
Majority		11,383	1.09%
Turnout		1,044,817	
Republican hold			

== Iowa ==
=== Iowa (special) ===
1926 United States Senate special election in Iowa
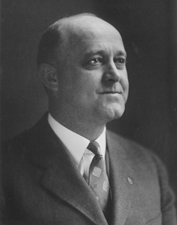
Nominee	David W. Stewart
Party	Republican
Popular vote	336,410
Percentage	100.00%
- County results Stewart: 90–100%
U.S. senator before election
David W. Stewart
Republican
Elected U.S. senator
David W. Stewart
Republican

Iowa special election
Party	Candidate	Votes	%
Republican	David W. Stewart (incumbent)	336,410	100.00%
Republican hold			

=== Iowa (regular) ===
1926 United States Senate election in Iowa
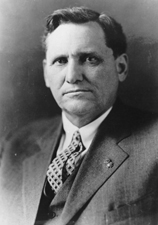

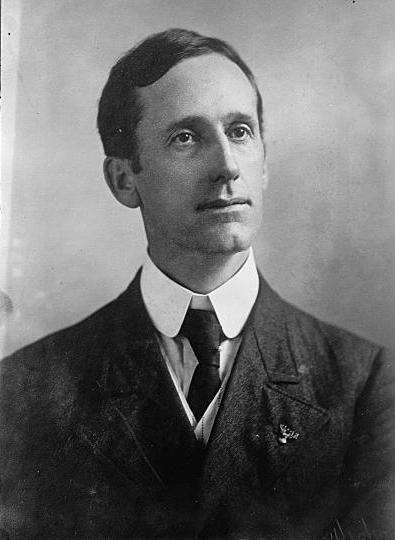
Nominee	Smith W. Brookhart	Claude R. Porter
Party	Republican	Democratic
Popular vote	323,409	247,869
Percentage	56.61%	43.39%
- County results Brookhart: 50–60% 60–70% 70–80% 80–90% Porter: 50–60% 60–70%
U.S. senator before election
David W. Stewart
Republican
Elected U.S. senator
Smith W. Brookhart
Republican

Iowa election
Party	Candidate	Votes	%
Republican	Smith W. Brookhart	323,409	56.61%
Democratic	Claude R. Porter	247,869	43.39%
Majority		75,540	13.22%
Turnout		571,278	
Republican hold			

== Kansas ==
1926 United States Senate election in Kansas

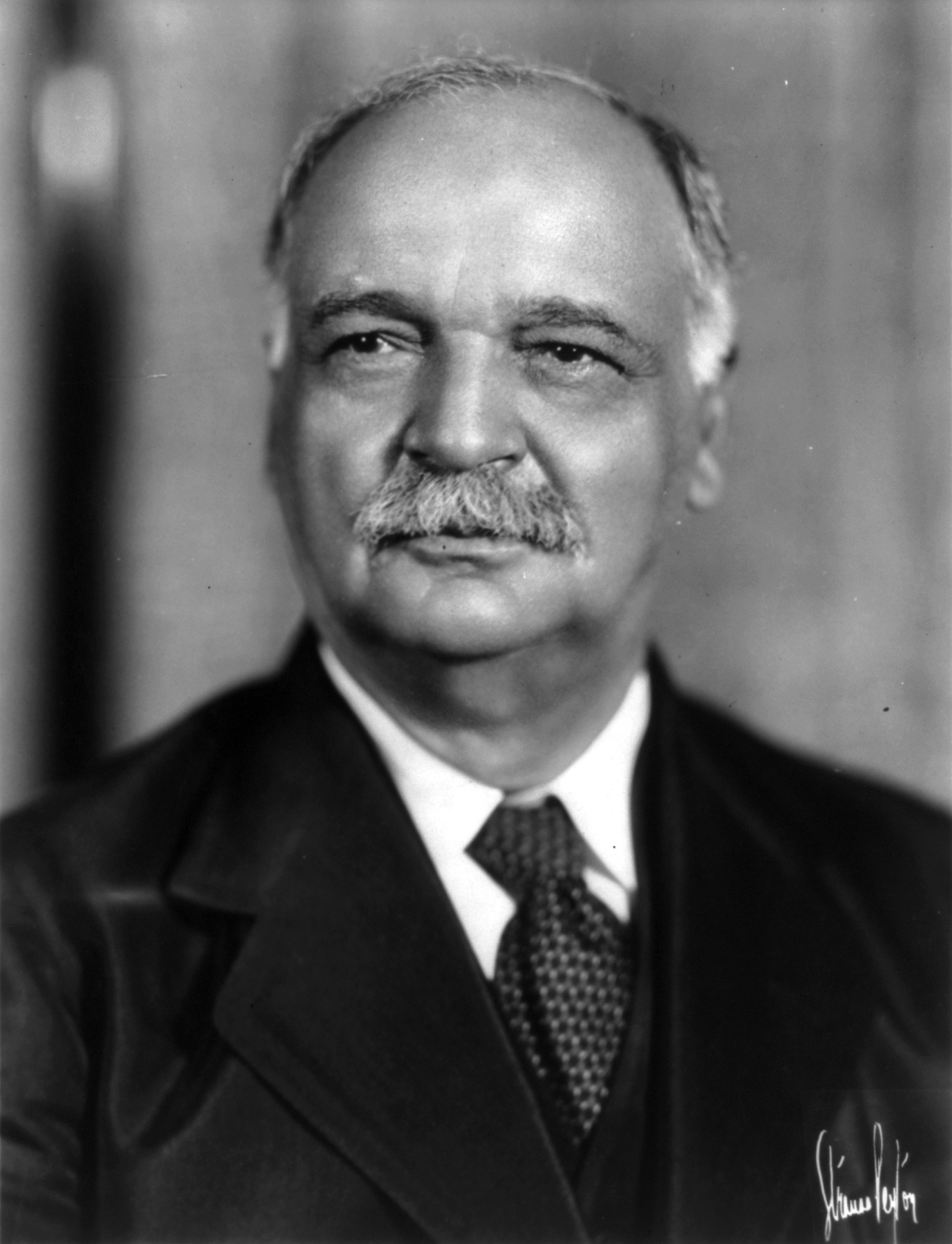

Nominee	Charles Curtis	Charles Stephens
Party	Republican	Democratic
Popular vote	308,222	168,446
Percentage	63.57%	34.74%
- County results Curtis: 50–60% 60–70% 70–80% Stephens: 40–50% 50–60%
U.S. senator before election
Charles Curtis
Republican
Elected U.S. senator
Charles Curtis
Republican

Kansas election
Party	Candidate	Votes	%
Republican	Charles Curtis (incumbent)	308,222	63.57%
Democratic	Charles Stephens	168,446	34.74%
Socialist	M. L. Phillips	8,208	1.69%
Majority		139,776	28.83%
Turnout		484,876	
Republican hold			

== Kentucky ==
1926 United States Senate election in Kentucky

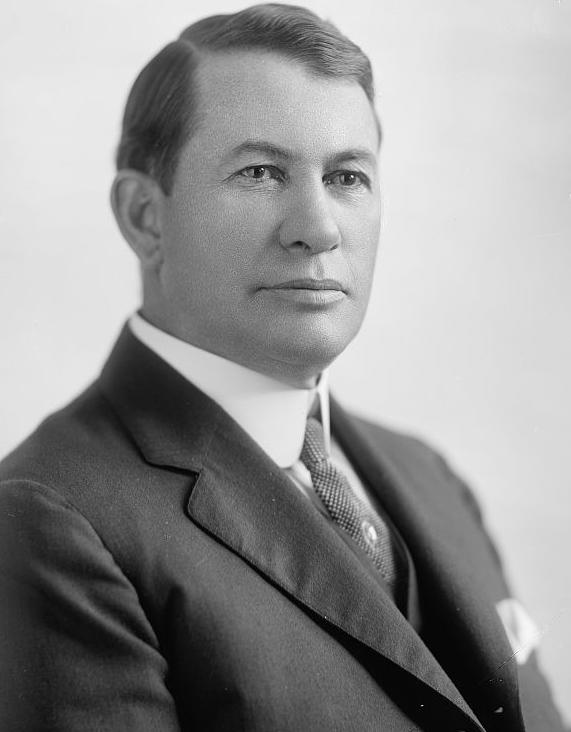

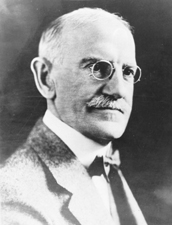
Nominee	Alben W. Barkley	Richard P. Ernst
Party	Democratic	Republican
Popular vote	286,997	266,657
Percentage	51.84%	48.16%
- County results Barkley: 50–60% 60–70% 70–80% 80–90% Ernst: 50–60% 60–70% 70–80% 80–90% >90%
U.S. senator before election
Richard P. Ernst
Republican
Elected U.S. senator
Alben W. Barkley
Democratic

Kentucky election
Party	Candidate	Votes	%
Democratic	Alben W. Barkley	286,997	51.84%
Republican	Richard P. Ernst (incumbent)	266,657	48.16%
Majority		20,340	3.68%
Turnout		553,654	
Democratic gain from Republican			

== Louisiana ==
1926 United States Senate election in Louisiana
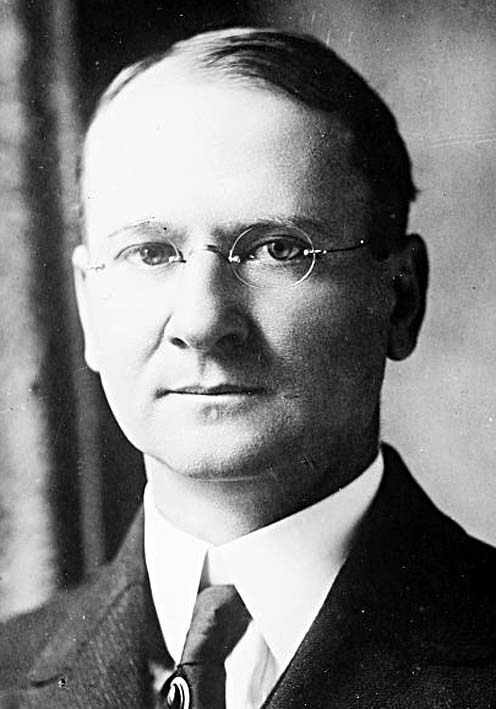
Nominee	Edwin S. Broussard
Party	Democratic
Popular vote	54,180
Percentage	100.0%
U.S. senator before election
Edwin S. Broussard
Democratic
Elected U.S. senator
Edwin S. Broussard
Democratic

Louisiana election
Party	Candidate	Votes	%
Democratic	Edwin S. Broussard (incumbent)	54,180	100.00%
Democratic hold			

== Maine (special) ==
1926 United States Senate Special election in Maine
- September 13, 1926
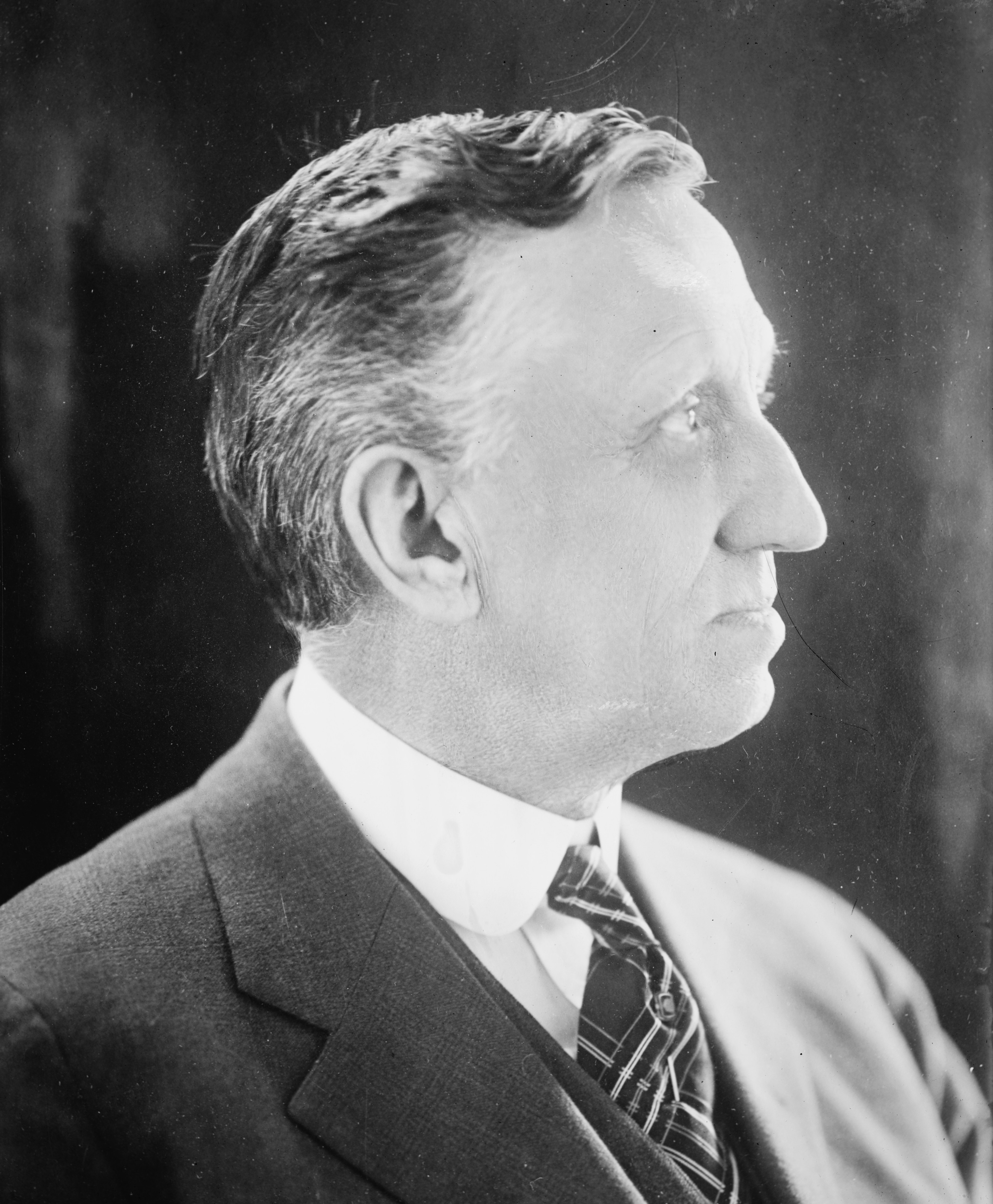

Nominee	Arthur R. Gould	Fulton J. Redman
Party	Republican	Democratic
Popular vote	79,498	31,225
Percentage	71.8%	28.2%
- County results Gould: 50–60% 60–70% 70–80% 90–100%
U.S. senator before election
Vacant
Elected U.S. senator
Arthur R. Gould
Republican

Maine special election
Party	Candidate	Votes	%
Republican	Arthur R. Gould	79,498	71.80%
Democratic	Fulton J. Redman	31,225	28.20%
Majority			43.60%
Turnout		110,723	
Republican hold			

== Maryland ==
1926 United States Senate election in Maryland
- November 2, 1926
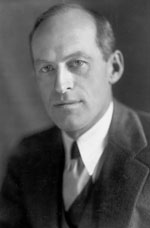

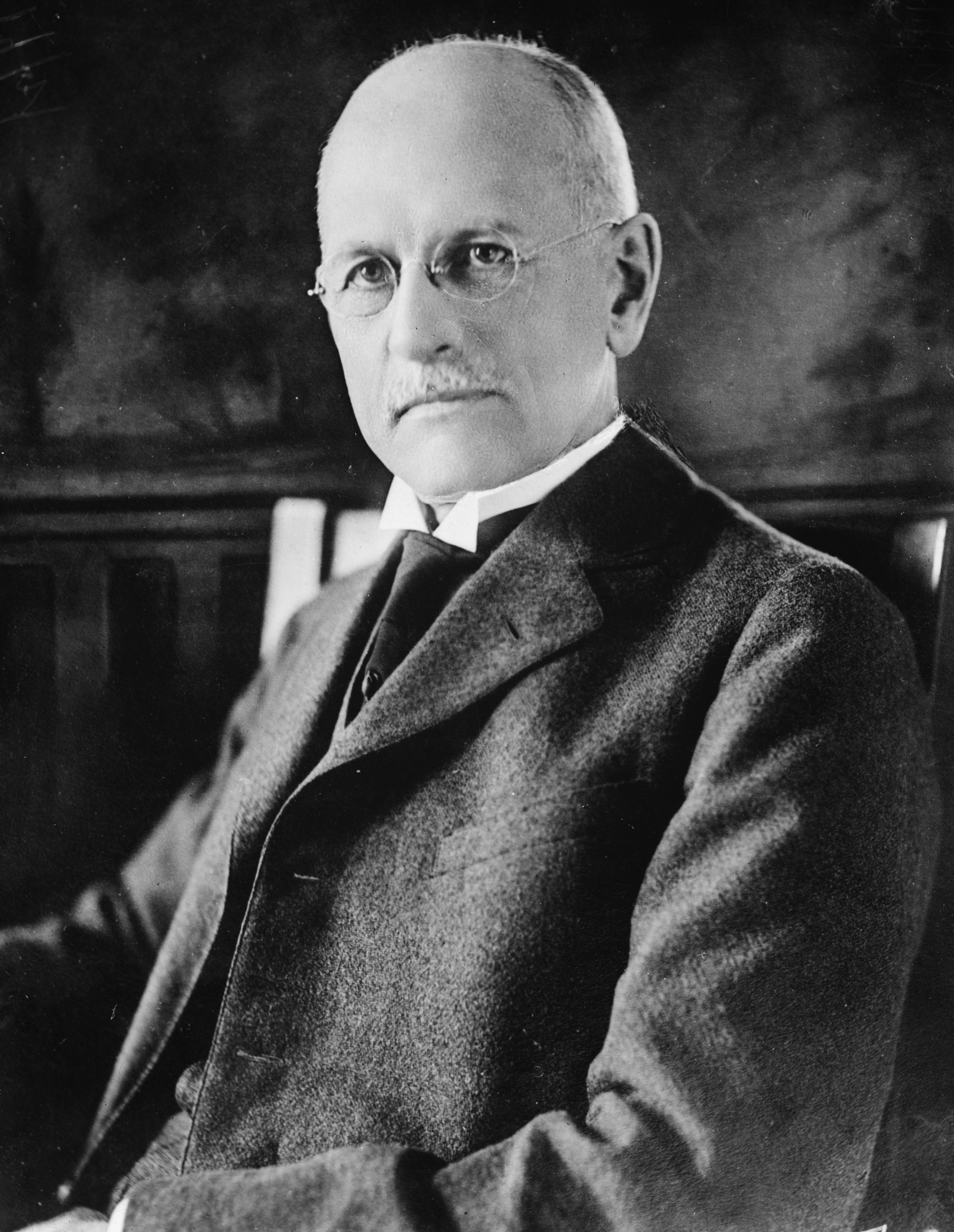
Nominee	Millard Tydings	Ovington Weller
Party	Democratic	Republican
Popular vote	195,410	140,695
Percentage	57.51%	41.41%
- County results Weller: 50–60% 60–70% Tydings: 50–60% 60–70% 70–80%
U.S. senator before election
Ovington Weller
Republican
Elected U.S. Senator
Millard Tydings
Democratic

Maryland election
Party	Candidate	Votes	%
Democratic	Millard Tydings	195,410	57.51%
Republican	Ovington Weller (incumbent)	140,695	41.41%
Socialist	William A. Toole	3,659	1.08%
Majority		54,715	16.10%
Turnout		339,764	
Democratic gain from Republican			

== Massachusetts (special) ==
1926 United States Senate special election in Massachusetts
- November 2, 1926
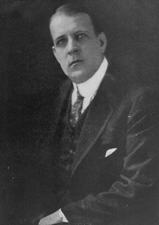

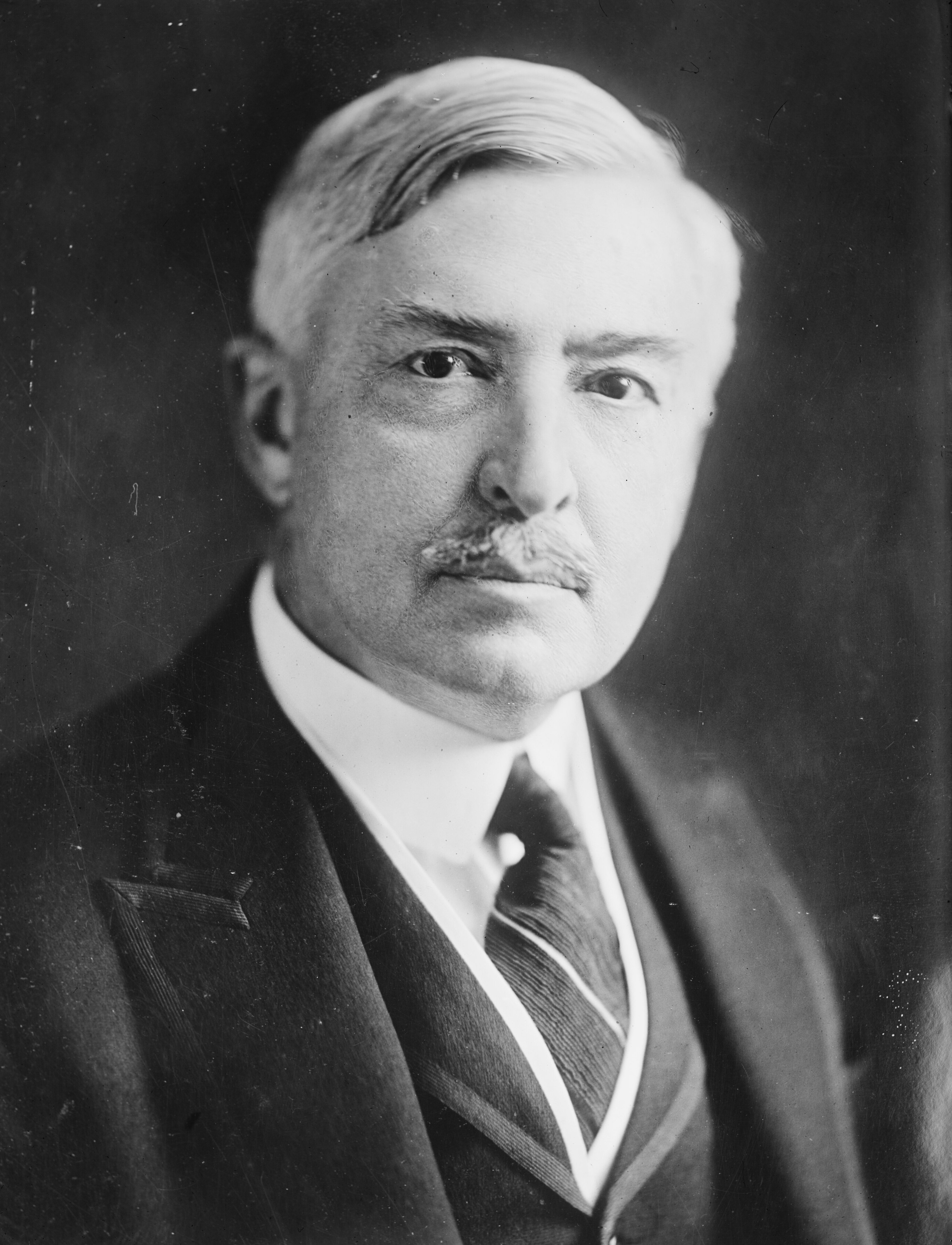
Nominee	David I. Walsh	William M. Butler
Party	Democratic	Republican
Popular vote	525,303	469,989
Percentage	52.01%	46.54%
- Walsh: 40–50% 50–60% 60–70% 70–80% 80–90% Butler: 40–50% 50–60% 60–70% 70–80% 80–90% >90%
U.S. senator before election
William M. Butler
Republican
Elected U.S. senator
David I. Walsh
Democratic

Massachusetts special election
Party	Candidate	Votes	%
Democratic	David I. Walsh	525,303	52.01%
Republican	William M. Butler (incumbent)	469,989	46.54%
Workers	John J. Ballam	5,167	0.51%
Modification Volstead Act	Washington Cook	4,766	0.47%
Socialist	Alfred Baker Lewis	4,730	0.47%
None	Scattering	11	0.00%
Majority		55,314	5.47%
Turnout		1,009,966	
Democratic gain from Republican			

== Missouri ==
There were two elections on the same day for the same seat, due to the May 16, 1925 death of Republican Selden P. Spencer.

Republican George H. Williams was appointed May 25, 1925, to continue the term, epending a special election. Williams ran in both the special election to finish the term and the regular election to the next term, but lost both races to Democrat Harry B. Hawes.

=== Missouri (special) ===
1926 United States Senate special election in Missouri
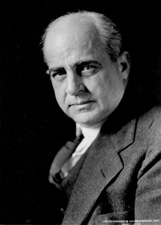

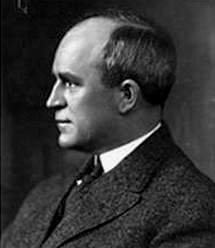
Nominee	Harry B. Hawes	George Howard Williams
Party	Democratic	Republican
Popular vote	514,389	473,068
Percentage	52.09%	47.91%
- County results Hawes: 50–60% 60–70% 70–80% 80–90% Williams: 50–60% 60–70% 70–80%
U.S. senator before election
George Howard Williams
Republican
Elected U.S. senator
Harry B. Hawes
Democratic

Missouri special election
Party	Candidate	Votes	%
Democratic	Harry B. Hawes	514,389	52.09%
Republican	George H. Williams (incumbent)	473,068	47.91%
Majority		41,321	4.18%
Turnout		987,457	
Democratic gain from Republican			

=== Missouri (regular) ===
1926 United States Senate election in Missouri
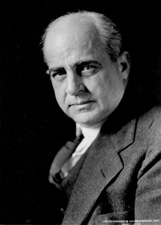

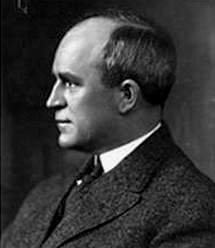
Nominee	Harry B. Hawes	George Howard Williams
Party	Democratic	Republican
Popular vote	506,015	470,654
Percentage	51.30%	47.71%
- County results Hawes: 40–50% 50–60% 60–70% 70–80% 80–90% Williams: 40–50% 50–60% 60–70% 70–80%
U.S. senator before election
George Howard Williams
Republican
Elected U.S. senator
Harry B. Hawes
Democratic

Missouri general election
Party	Candidate	Votes	%
Democratic	Harry B. Hawes	506,015	51.30%
Republican	George H. Williams (incumbent)	470,654	47.71%
Prohibition	Herman P. Faris	7,540	0.76%
Socialist	Robert D. Morrison	1,807	0.18%
Socialist Labor	William Wesley Cox	464	0.05%
Majority		35,361	3.29%
Turnout		986,480	
Democratic gain from Republican			

== Nevada ==
Nevada election
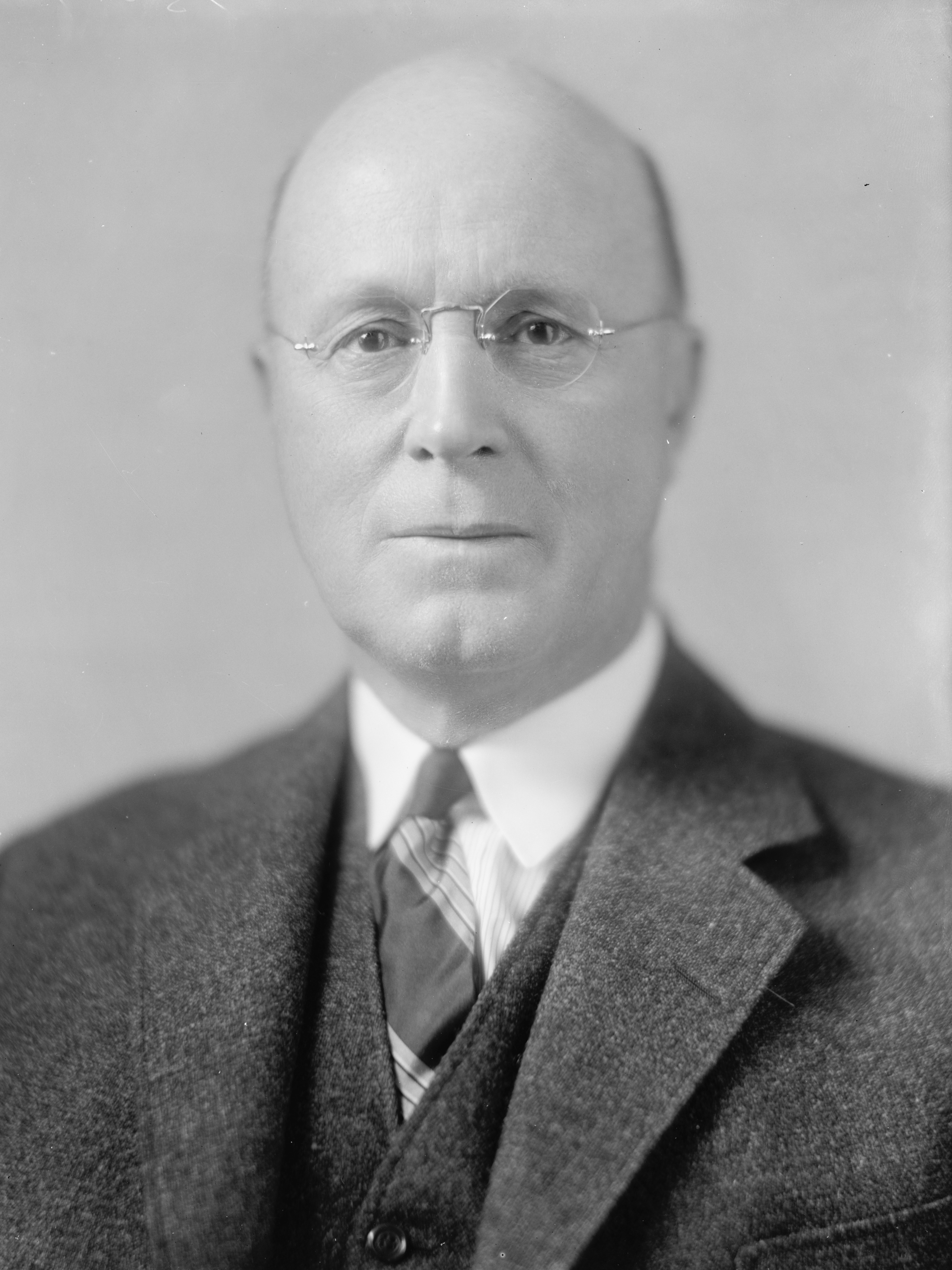

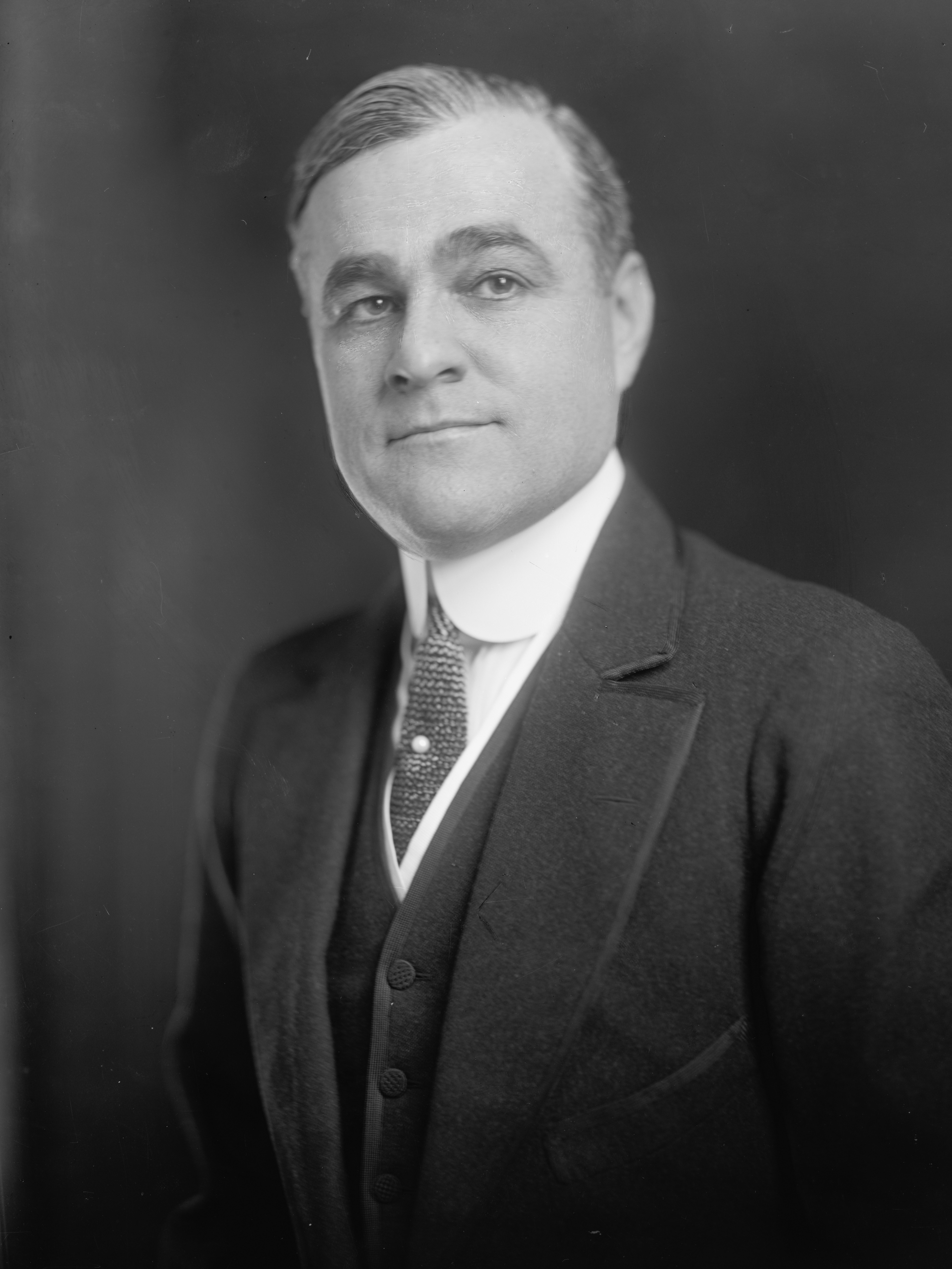
Nominee	Tasker Oddie	Raymond T. Baker
Party	Republican	Democratic
Popular vote	17,430	13,273
Percentage	55.8%	42.5%
- Results by county Oddie: 50–60% 60–70% 70–80% Baker: 50–60%
U.S. senator before election
Tasker Oddie
Republican
Elected U.S. senator
Tasker Oddie
Republican

Nevada election
Party	Candidate	Votes	%
Republican	Tasker Oddie (incumbent)	17,430	55.78%
Democratic	Raymond T. Baker	13,273	42.48%
Independent	George A. Bice	543	1.74%
Majority		4157	13.30%
Turnout		31,246	
Republican hold			

== New Hampshire ==
1926 United States Senate election in New Hampshire
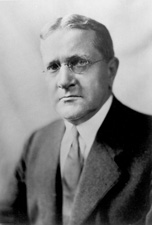

Nominee	George H. Moses	Robert C. Murchie
Party	Republican	Democratic
Popular vote	79,279	47,935
Percentage	62.3%	37.7%
- Moses: 50–60% 60–70% 70–80% 80–90% 90-100% Murchie: 50–60% 60–70% 70–80%
U.S. senator before election
George H. Moses
Republican
Elected U.S. senator
George H. Moses
Republican

New Hampshire election
Party	Candidate	Votes	%
Republican	George H. Moses (incumbent)	79,279	62.32%
Democratic	Robert C. Murchie	47,935	37.68%
Majority			24.64%
Turnout		127,214	
Republican hold			

== New York ==
1926 United States Senate election in New York
- November 2, 1926
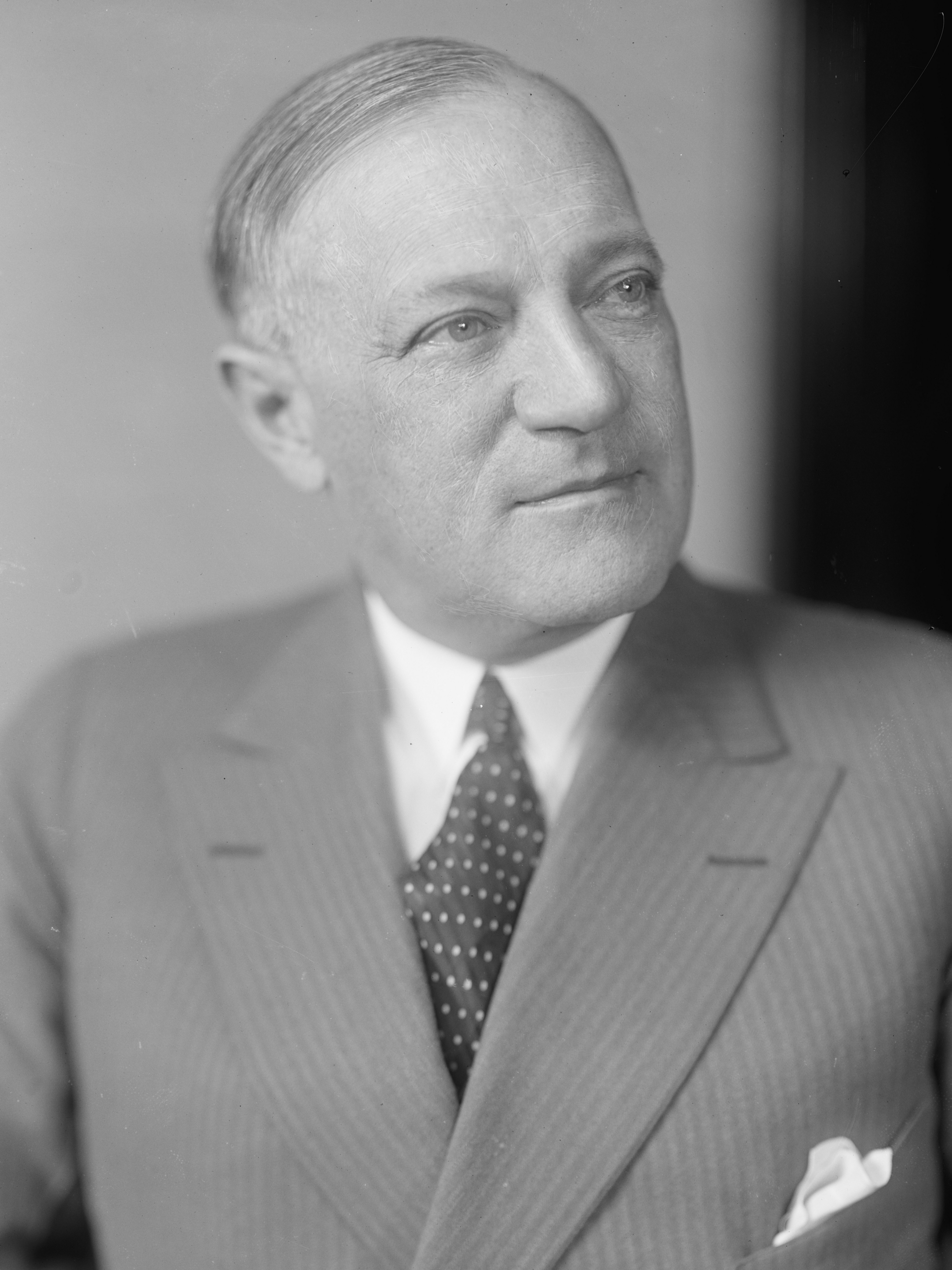

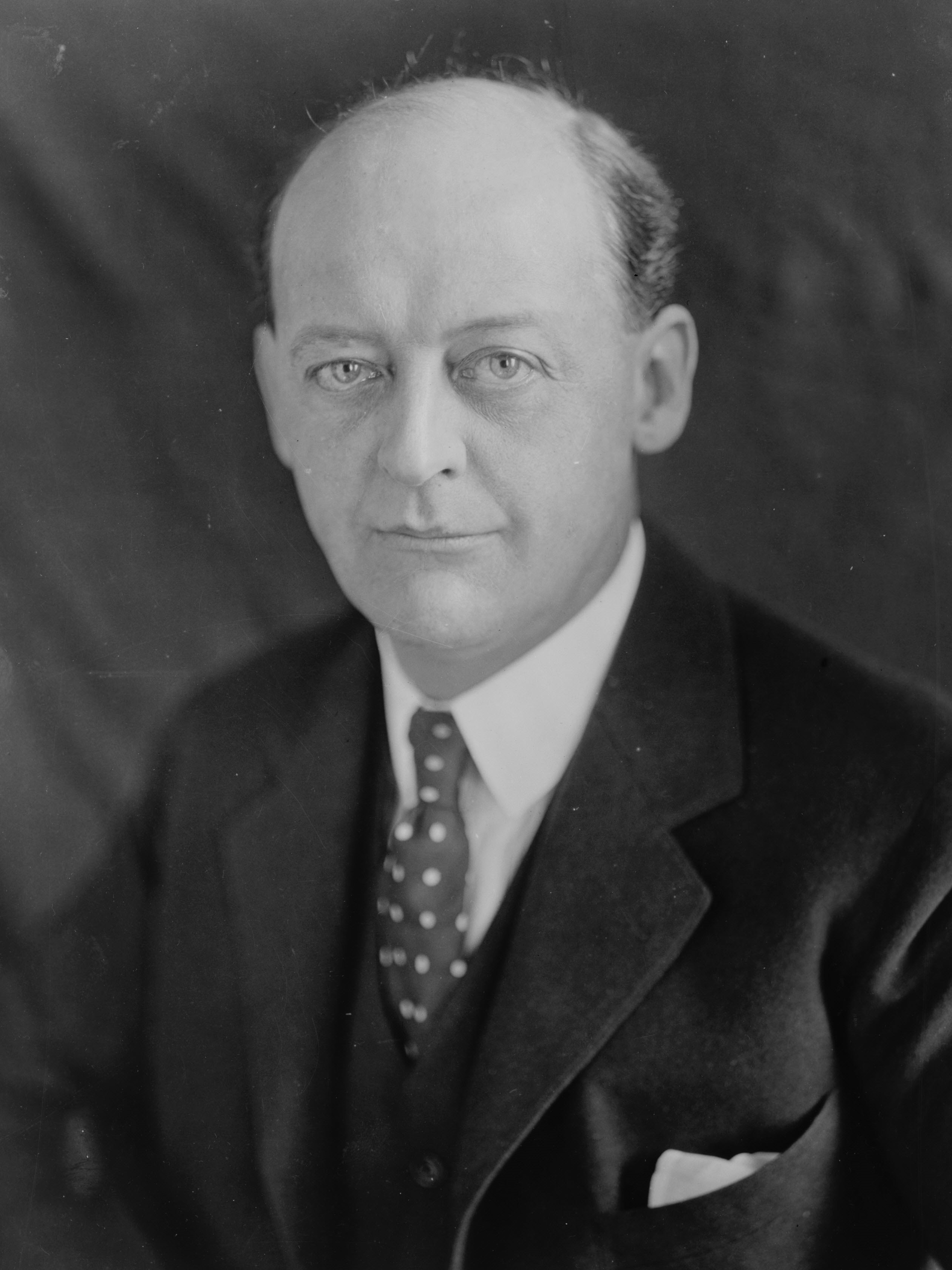

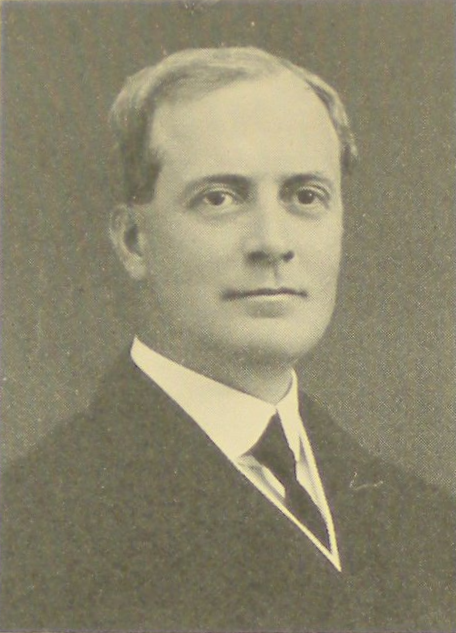
Nominee	Robert F. Wagner	James W. Wadsworth	Franklin W. Cristman
Party	Democratic	Republican	Independent Republican
Alliance			Prohibition
Popular vote	1,321,463	1,205,246	231,906
Percentage	46.48%	42.40%	8.16%
- County results Wagner: 50–60% 60–70% Wadsworth: 30–40% 40–50% 50–60% 60–70%
Senator before election
James W. Wadsworth
Republican
Elected Senator
Robert F. Wagner
Democratic

New York election
Party	Candidate	Votes	%
Democratic	Robert F. Wagner	1,321,463	46.48%
Republican	James W. Wadsworth Jr. (incumbent)	1,205,246	42.40%
Independent Republican	Franklin W. Cristman	231,906	8.16%
Socialist	Jessie W. Hughan	73,412	2.58%
Workers	William F. Dunne	6,444	0.23%
Socialist Labor	Joseph Brandon	4,342	0.15%
Majority		116,217	4.08%
Turnout		2,842,813	
Democratic gain from Republican			

== North Carolina ==
1926 United States Senate election in North Carolina
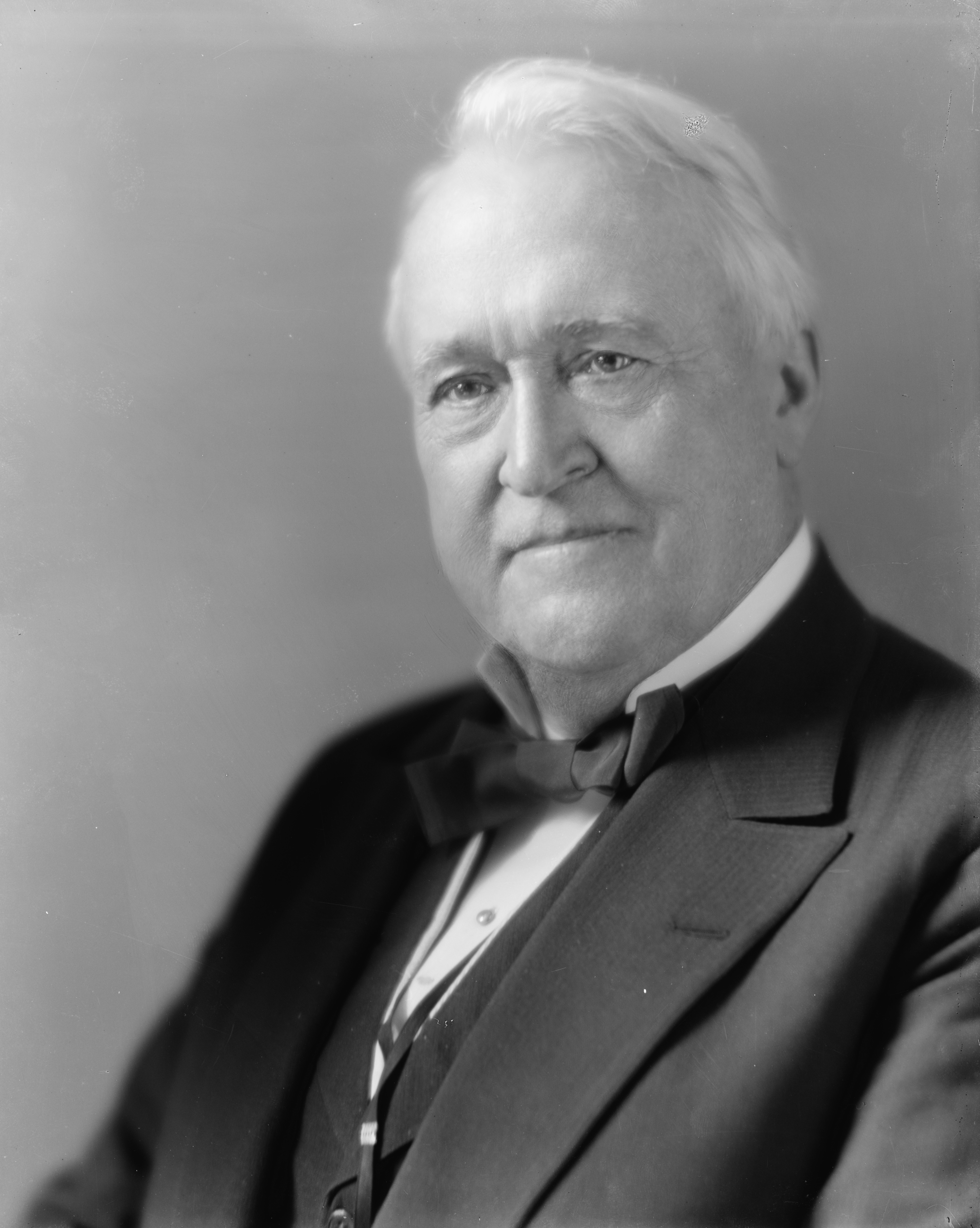

Nominee	Lee S. Overman	Johnson J. Hayes
Party	Democratic	Republican
Popular vote	218,934	142,891
Percentage	60.5%	39.5%
- County results Overman: 50–60% 60–70% 70–80% 80–90% 90–100% Hayes: 50–60% 60–70% 70–80%
U.S. senator before election
Lee S. Overman
Democratic
Elected U.S. senator
Lee S. Overman
Democratic

North Carolina election
Party	Candidate	Votes	%
Democratic	Lee Slater Overman (incumbent)	218,934	60.51%
Republican	Johnson J. Hayes	142,891	39.49%
Majority		76,043	21.02%
Turnout		361,825	
Democratic hold			

== North Dakota ==
There were two elections due to the June 22, 1925 death of one-term Republican Edwin F. Ladd. Republican Gerald Nye was appointed November 14, 1925, to continue the term, pending a special election. Nye later won the June 1926 special election to finish the term and the November 1926 general election to the next term.

=== North Dakota (special) ===
1926 United States Senate special election in North Dakota
- June 30, 1926
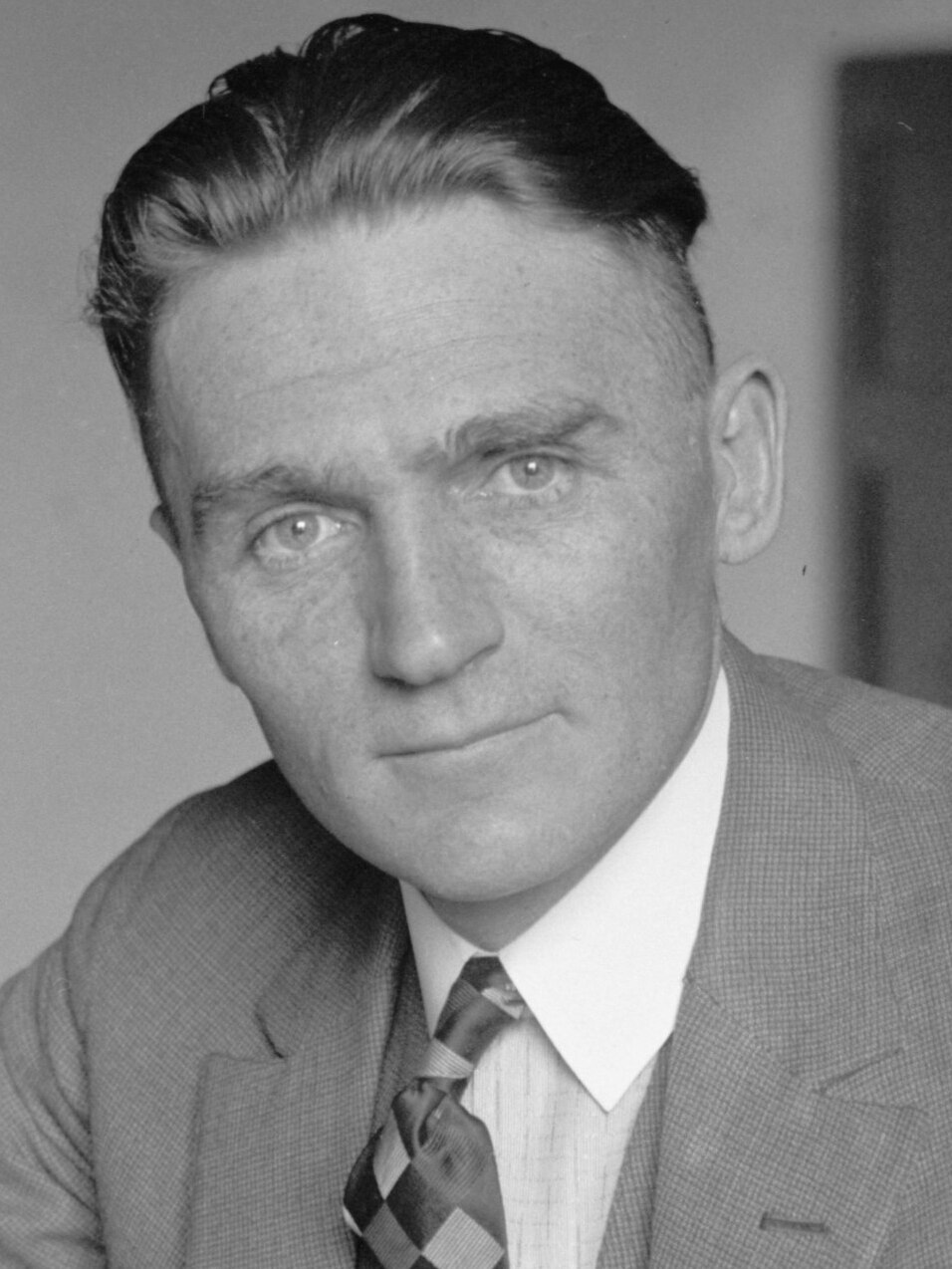

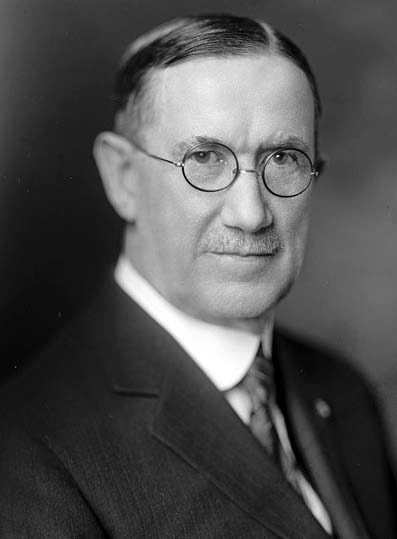

Nominee	Gerald Nye	L. B. Hanna	C. P. Stone
Party	Nonpartisan League	Republican	Independent Republican
Alliance		Democratic
Popular vote	79,709	59,499	19,586
Percentage	50.19%	37.46%	12.33%
- County results Nye: 40–50% 50–60% 60–70% 70–80% Hanna: 40–50% 50–60%
U.S. senator before election
Gerald Nye
Republican
Elected U.S. Senator
Gerald Nye
Republican

Nye was elected on the Nonpartisan League ticket, but served as a Republican.

North Dakota special election, June 30, 1926
Party	Candidate	Votes	%
Nonpartisan League	Gerald Nye (incumbent)	79,709	50.20%
Republican	Louis B. Hanna	59,499	37.47%
Independent Republican	C. P. Stone	19,586	12.33%
Majority		88,970	57.36%
Turnout			24.55%
Non-Partisan League hold			

=== North Dakota (regular) ===
1926 United States Senate election in North Dakota
- November 2, 1926
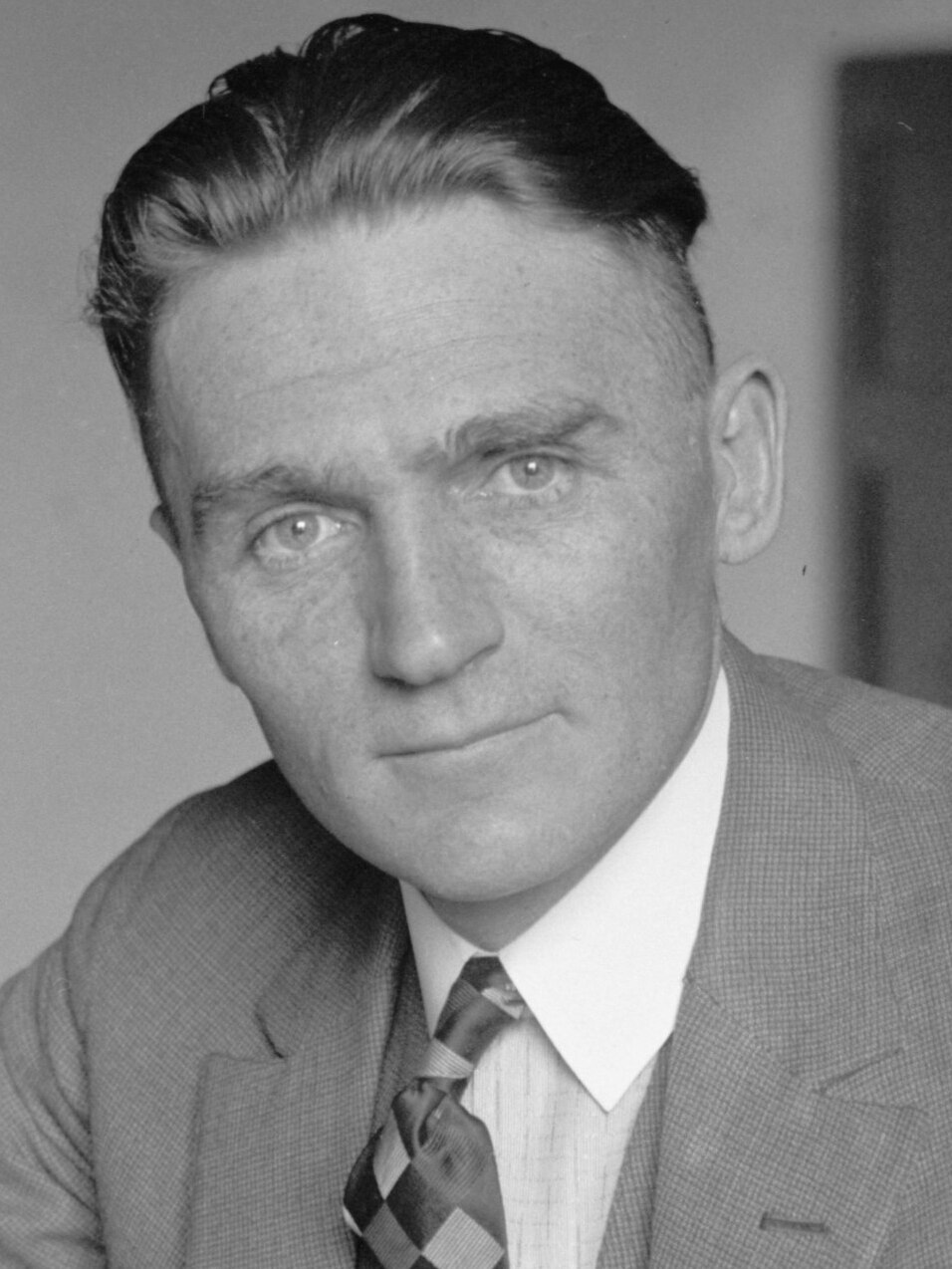

Nominee	Gerald Nye	Norris H. Nelson
Party	Republican	Independent Republican
Popular vote	107,921	18,951
Percentage	69.58%	12.22%
Nominee	F. F. Burchard	C. P. Stone
Party	Democratic	Independent Republican
Popular vote	13,519	9,738
Percentage	8.72%	6.28%
- County results Nye: 50–60% 60–70% 70–80% 80–90%
U.S. senator before election
Gerald Nye
Republican
Elected U.S. Senator
Gerald Nye
Republican

North Dakota regular election, November 2, 1926
Party	Candidate	Votes	%
Republican	Gerald Nye (incumbent)	107,921	69.58%
Independent	Norris H. Nelson	18,951	12.22%
Democratic	F. F. Burchard	13,519	8.72%
Independent	C. P. Stone	9,738	6.28%
Independent	William Lemke	4,977	3.21%
Majority		88,970	57.36%
Turnout		155,106	
Republican hold			

== Ohio ==
1926 United States Senate election in Ohio
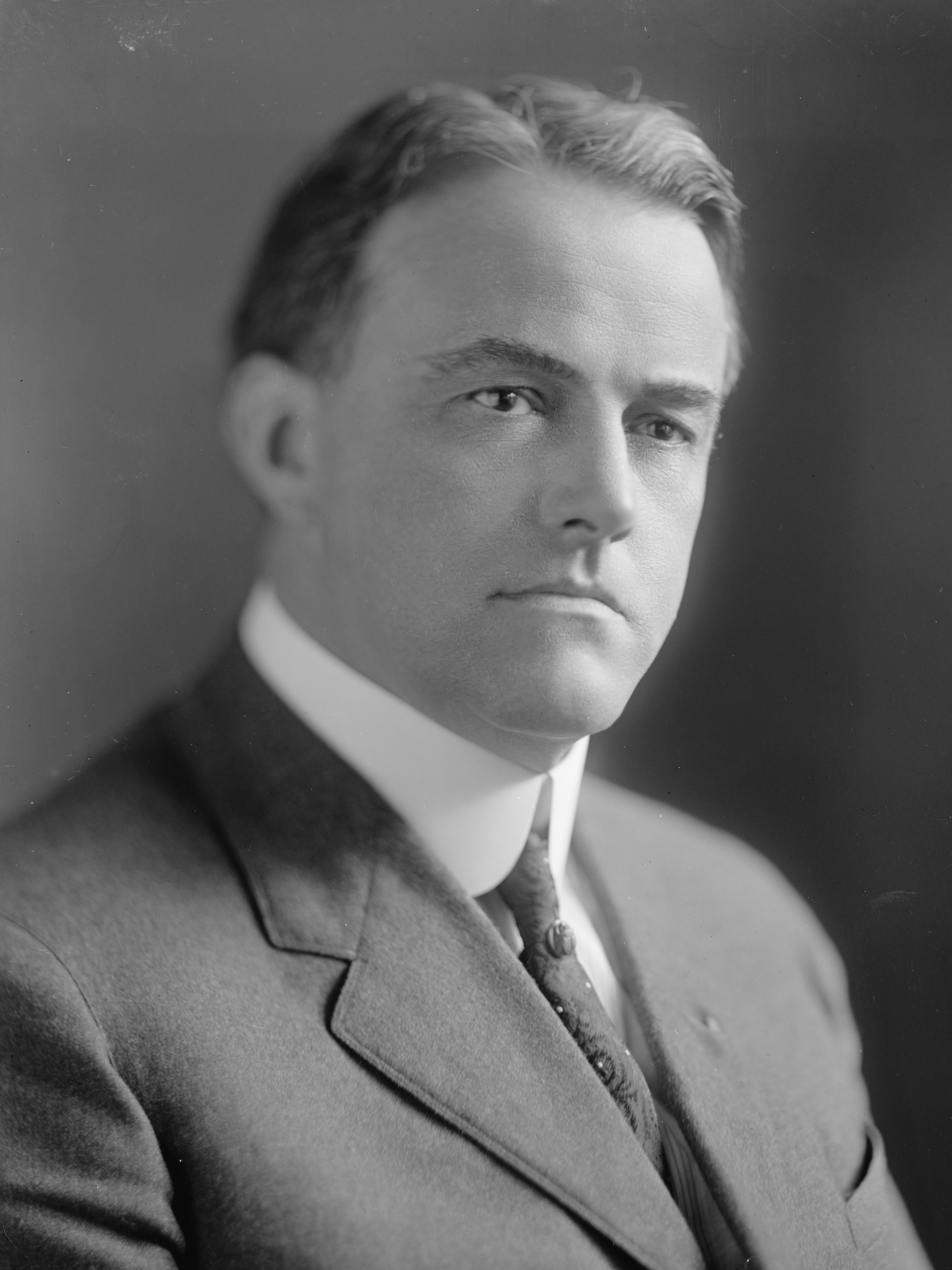

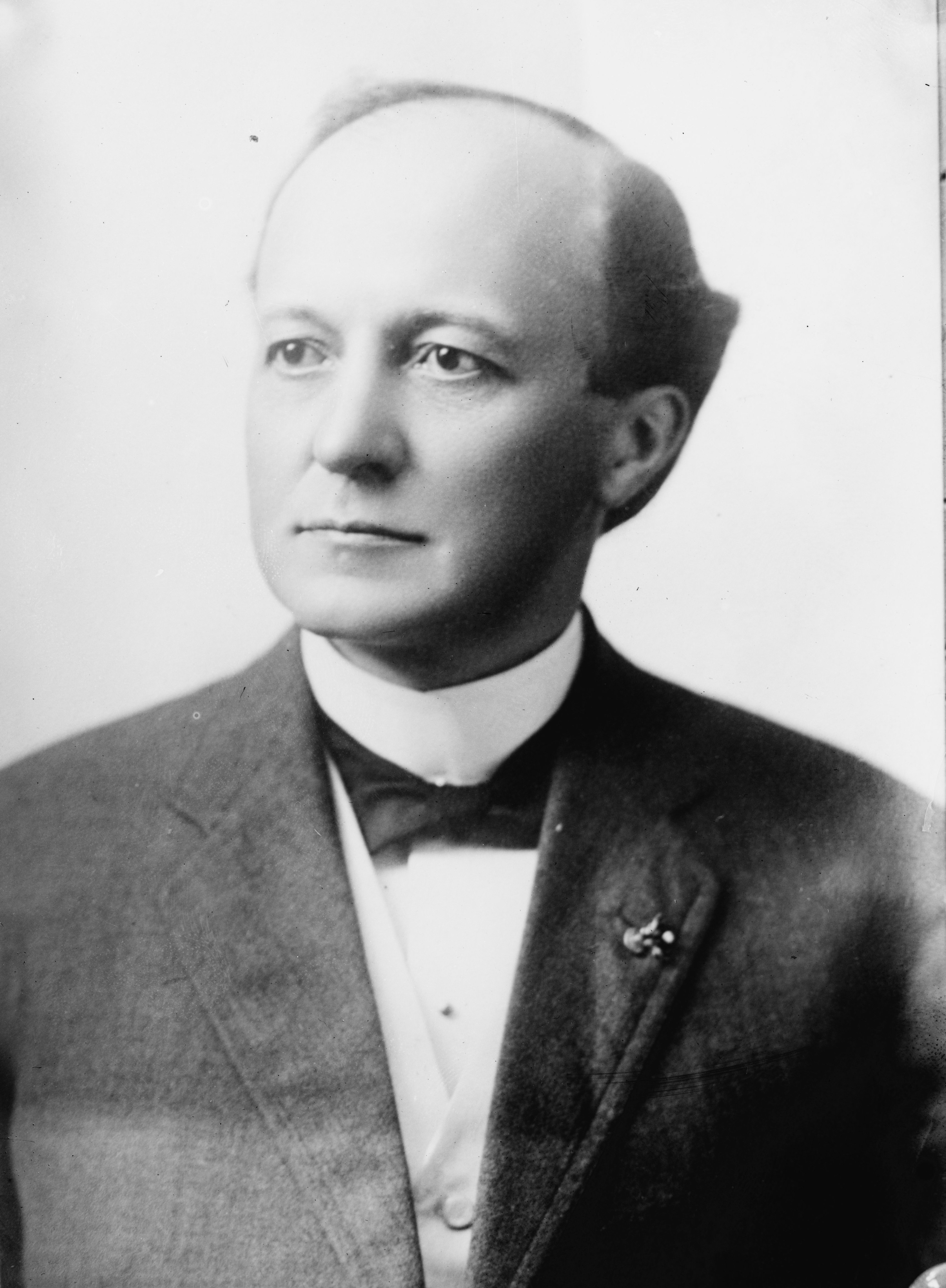
Nominee	Frank B. Willis	Atlee Pomerene
Party	Republican	Democratic
Popular vote	711,359	623,221
Percentage	53.2%	46.6%
- County results Willis: 40–50% 50–60% 60–70% 70–80% Pomerene: 50–60% 60–70%
U.S. senator before election
Frank B. Willis
Republican
Elected U.S. senator
Frank B. Willis
Republican

Ohio election
Party	Candidate	Votes	%
Republican	Frank B. Willis (incumbent)	711,359	53.19%
Democratic	Atlee Pomerene	623,221	46.60%
Socialist Labor	Goerke	2,846	0.21%
Majority		88,138	6.59%
Turnout		1,337,426	
Republican hold			

== Oklahoma ==
1926 United States Senate election in Oklahoma
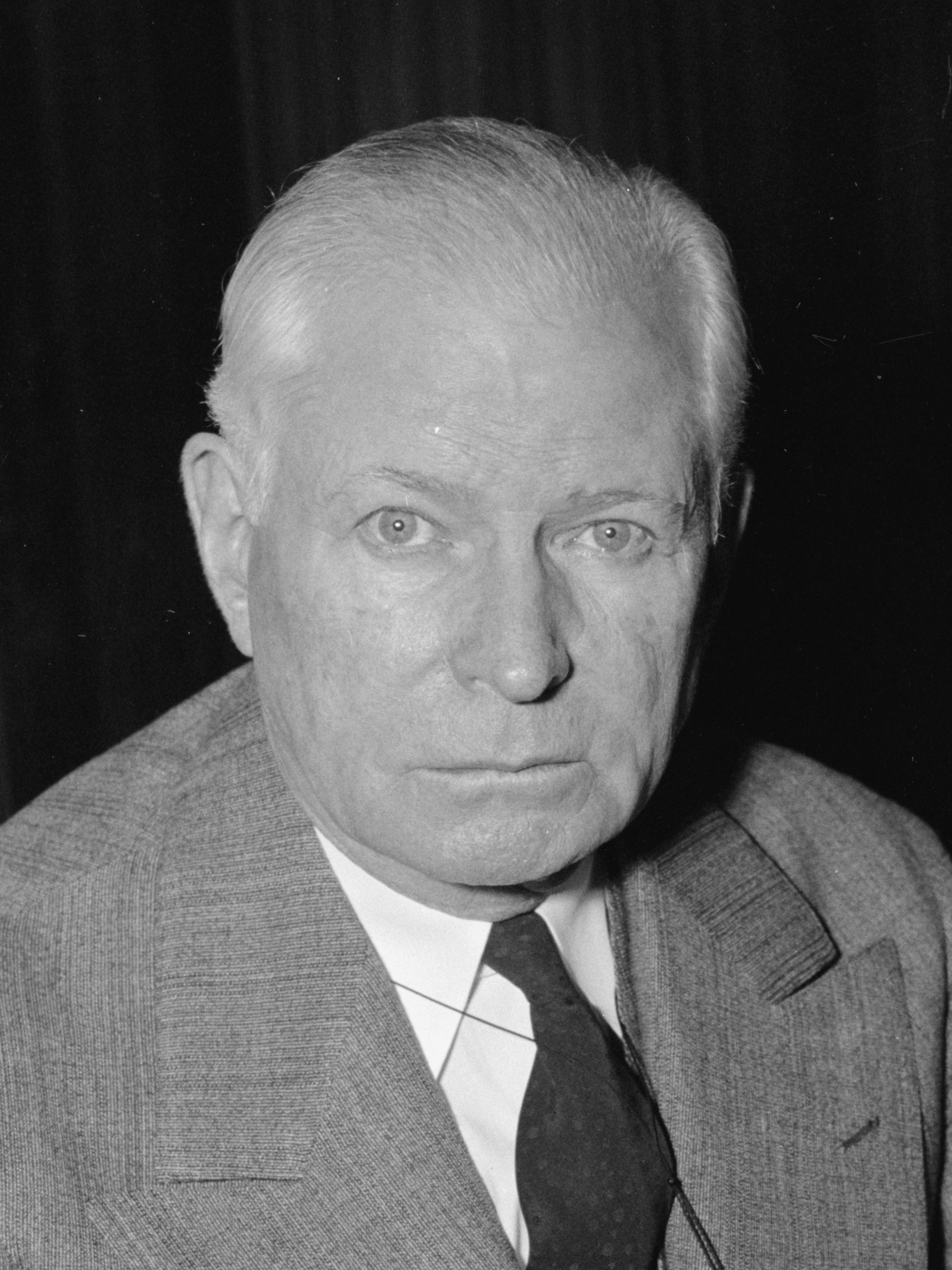

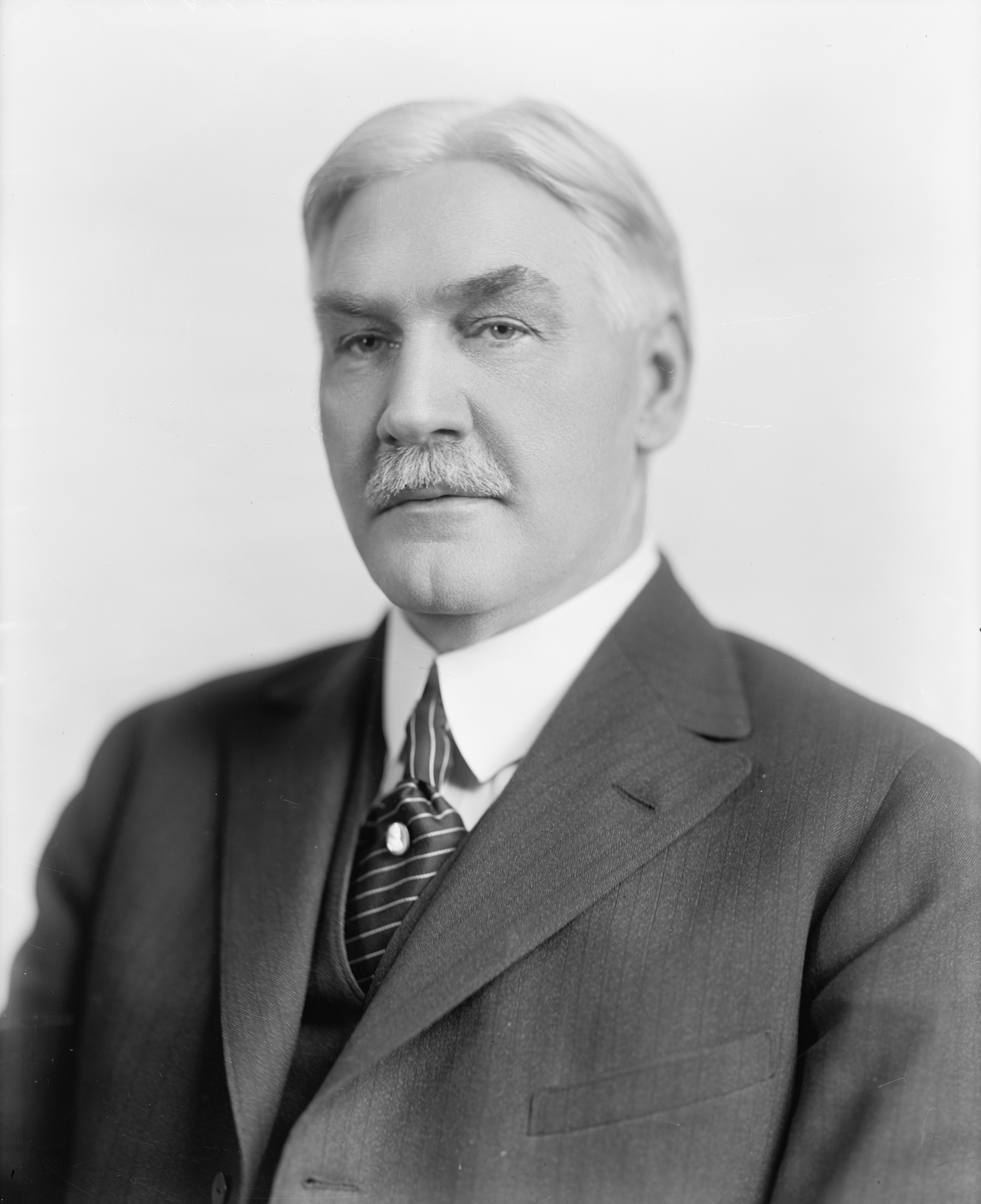
Nominee	Elmer Thomas	John W. Harreld
Party	Democratic	Republican
Popular vote	195,587	155,829
Percentage	55.4%	44.1%
- County results Thomas: 50–60% 60–70% 70–80% 80–90% Harreld: 40–50% 50–60% 60–70%
U.S. senator before election
John W. Harreld
Republican
Elected U.S. senator
Elmer Thomas
Democratic

Oklahoma election
Party	Candidate	Votes	%
Democratic	Elmer Thomas	195,587	55.35%
Republican	John W. Harreld (incumbent)	155,829	44.10%
Socialist	J. A. Hart	1,009	0.29%
Farmer–Labor	J. Edwin Spurr	781	0.22%
Independent	Thomas P. Hopley	143	0.04%
Majority		39,758	11.25%
Turnout		353,349	
Democratic gain from Republican			

== Oregon ==
1926 United States Senate election in Oregon
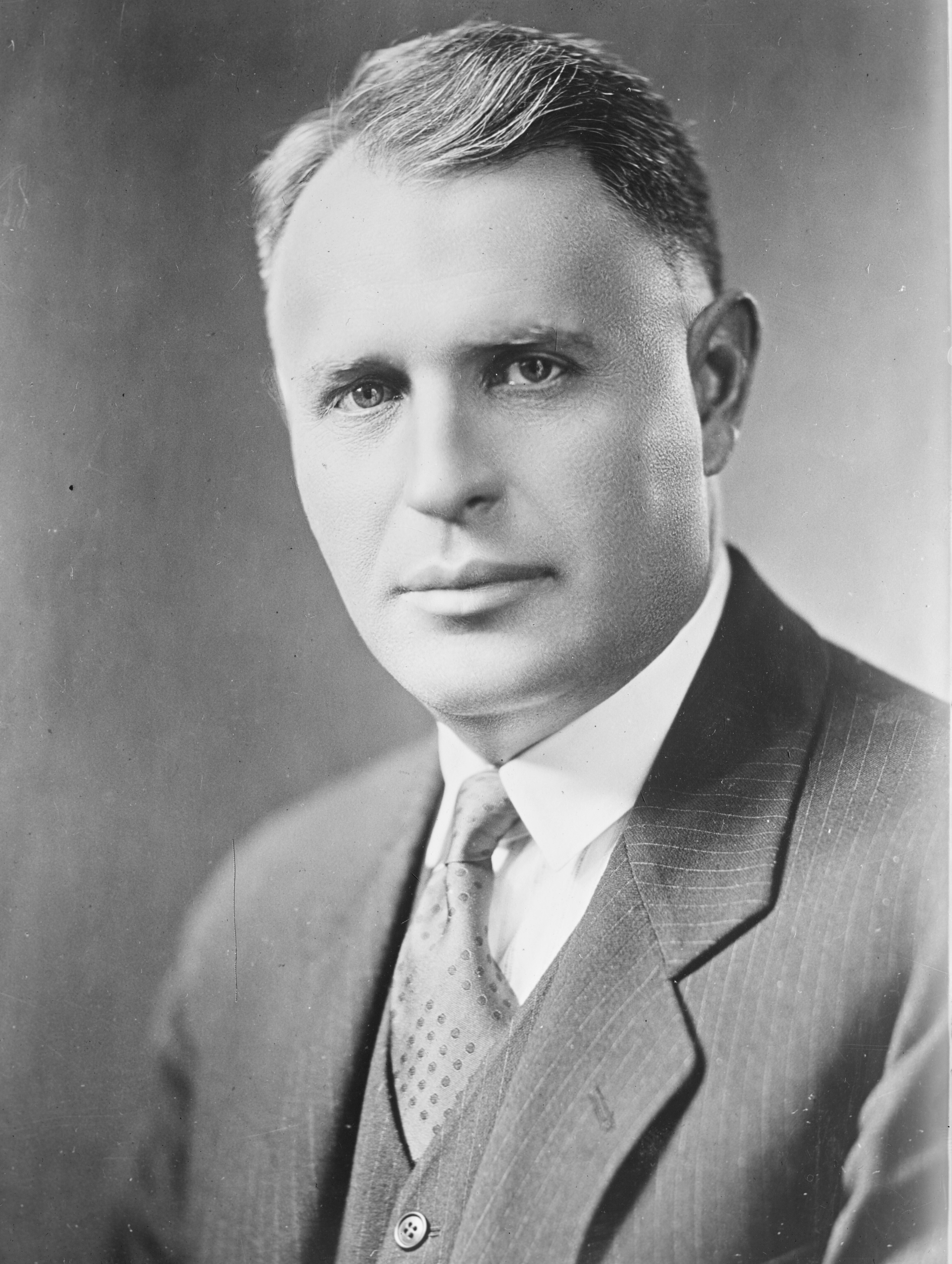

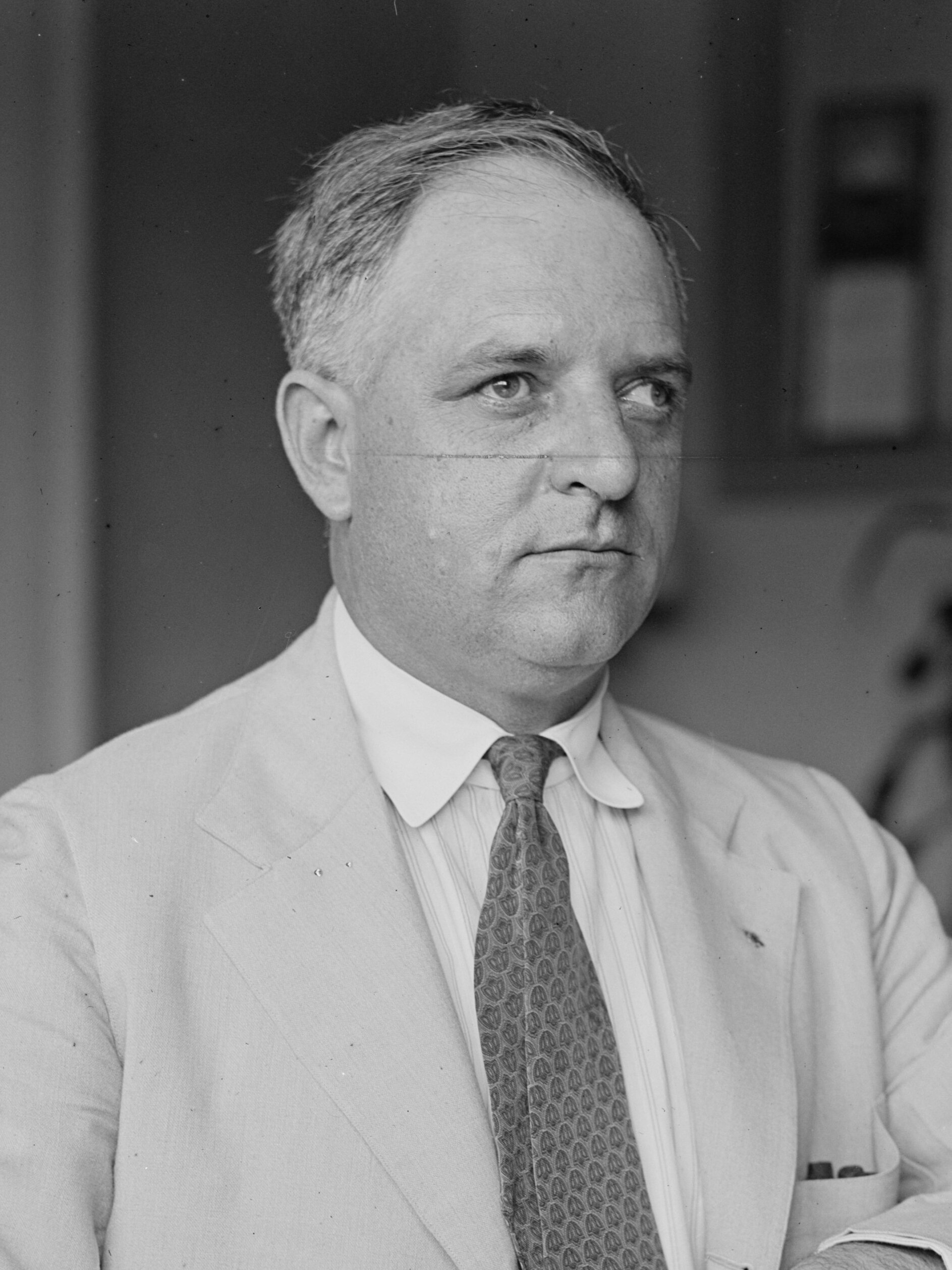

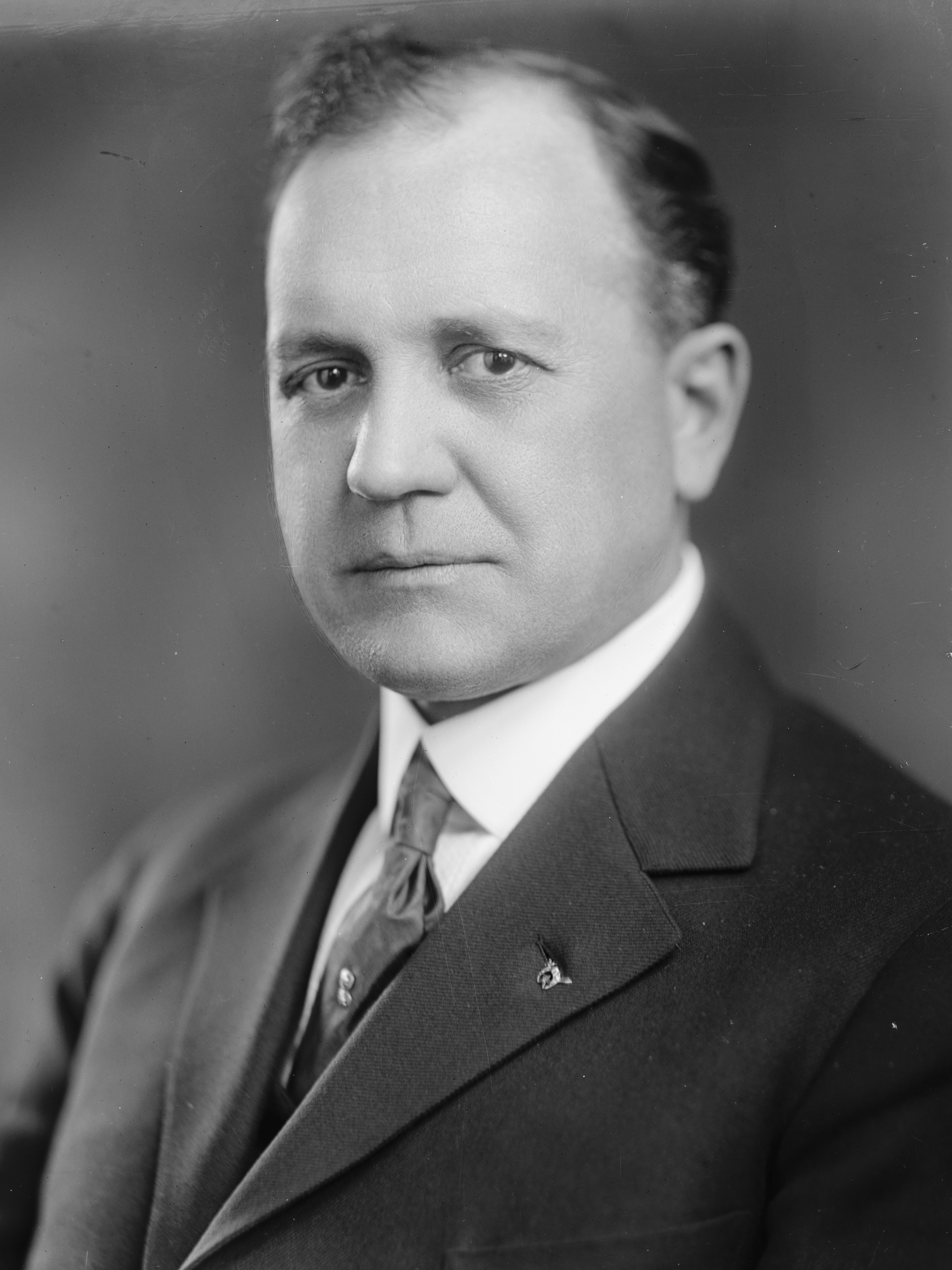
Nominee	Frederick Steiwer	Bert E. Haney	Robert N. Stanfield
Party	Republican	Democratic	Independent
Popular vote	89,007	81,301	50,246
Percentage	39.8%	36.3%	22.5%
- County results Steiwer: 30–40% 40–50% 50–60% Haney: 30–40% 40–50%
U.S. senator before election
Robert N. Stanfield
Republican
Elected U.S. senator
Frederick Steiwer
Republican

Oregon election
Party	Candidate	Votes	%
Republican	Frederick Steiwer	89,007	39.79%
Democratic	Bert E. Haney	81,301	36.34%
Independent	Robert N. Stanfield (incumbent)	50,246	22.46%
Independent	W. P. Adams	3,145	1.41%
Majority		7,706	3.45%
Turnout		223,699	
Republican gain from Independent			

== Pennsylvania ==
1926 United States Senate election in Pennsylvania
- November 2, 1926
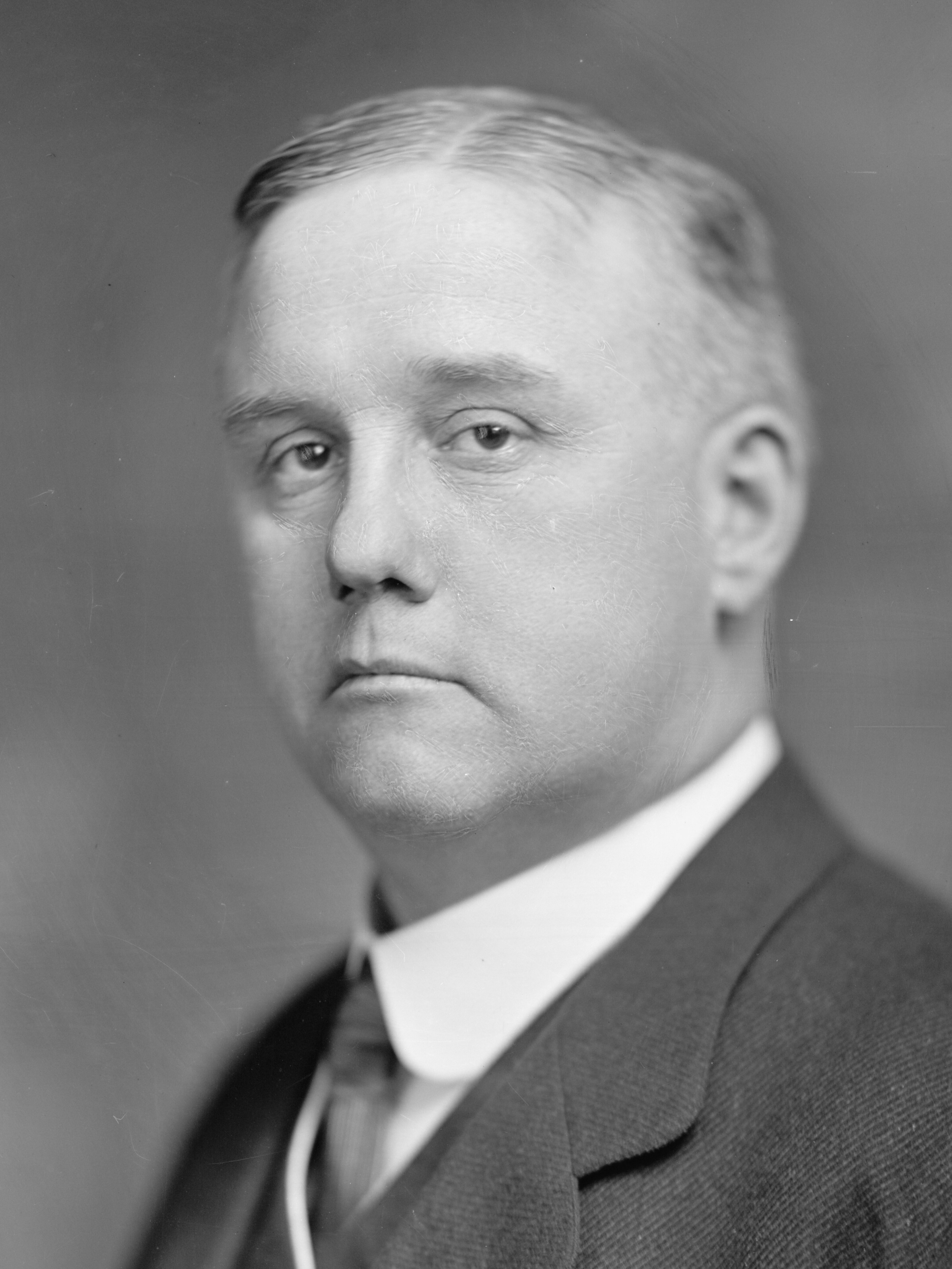

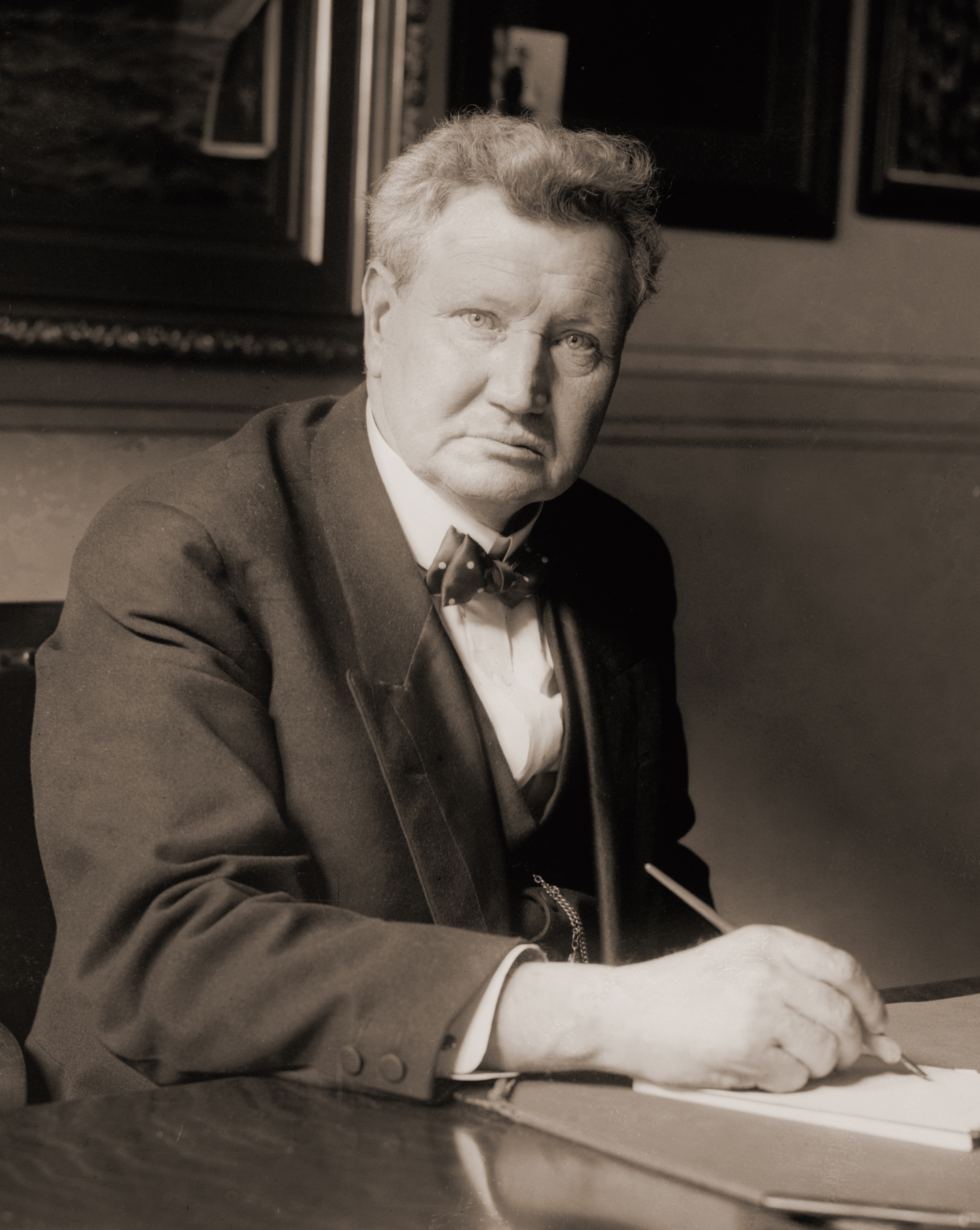
Nominee	William Scott Vare	William Bauchop Wilson
Party	Republican	Democratic
Popular vote	822,187	648,680
Percentage	54.64%	43.11%
- County results Vare: 40–50% 50–60% 60–70% 70–80% Wilson: 40–50% 50–60% 60–70% 70–80%
U.S. senator before election
George W. Pepper
Republican
Elected U.S. Senator
William Scott Vare (Note: Not seated)
Republican

General election results
Party	Candidate	Votes	%
Republican	William Scott Vare	882,187	54.64%
Democratic	William Bauchop Wilson	648,680	43.11%
Prohibition	Elisha Kent Kane	19,523	1.30%
Socialist	George W. Snyder	9,869	0.66%
Workers	A. J. Carey	3,094	0.21%
Commonwealth Land	Robert C. Macauly	1,053	0.07%
None	Scattering	290	0.02%
Majority		173,507	11.53%
Turnout		1,504,696	
Republican hold			

== South Carolina ==
1926 Democratic Senate primary in South Carolina
- August 31 and September 14, 1926
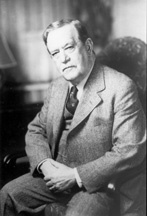

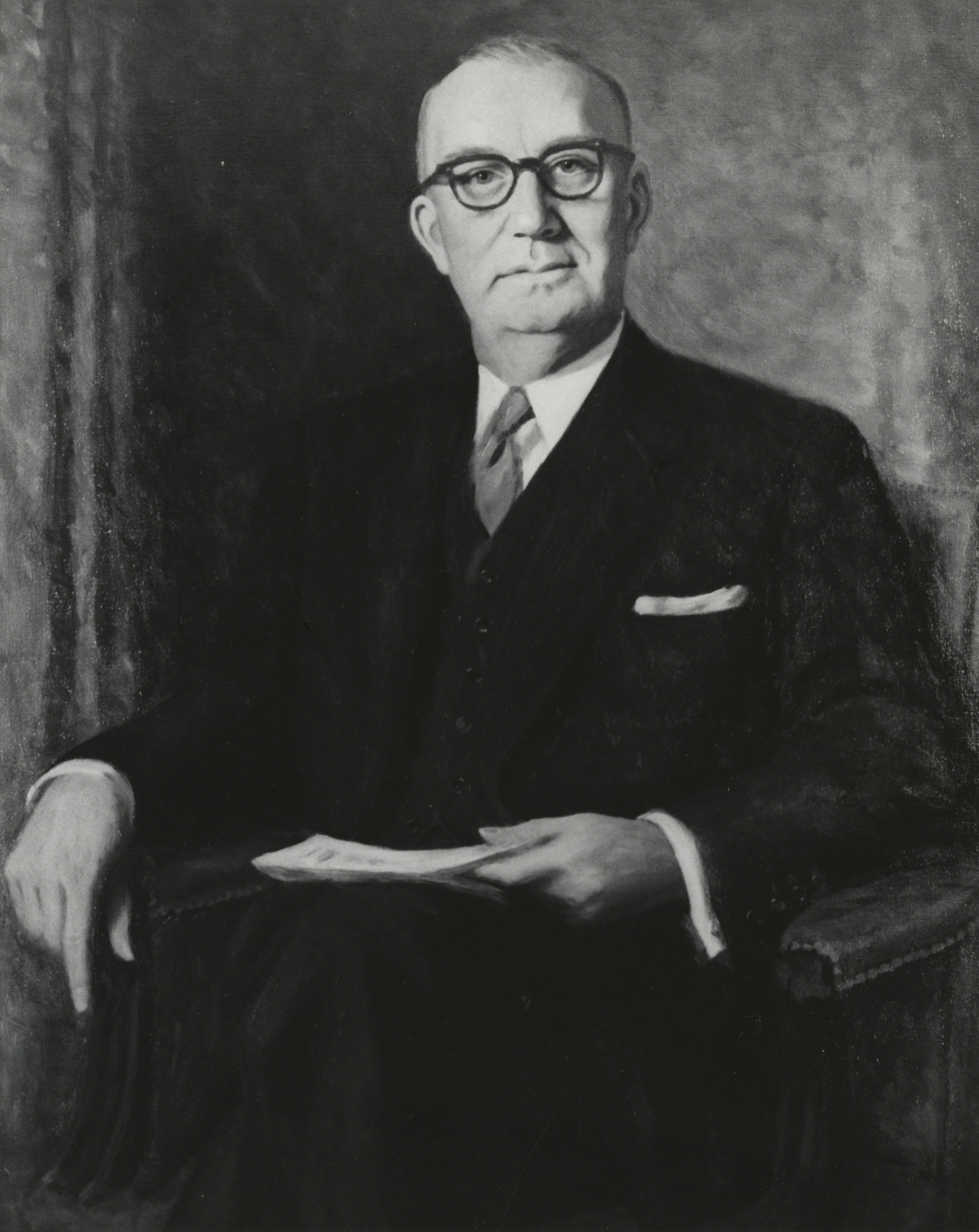
Nominee	Ellison D. Smith	Edgar Allan Brown
Party	Democratic	Democratic
Popular vote	72,015 primary 82,783 runoff	65,331 primary 77,559 runoff
Percentage	41.99% primary 51.62% runoff	38.10% primary 48.38% runoff
- Smith: 30–40% 40–50% 50–60% 60–70% 70–80% Brown: 30–40% 40–50% 50–60% 60–70% 70–80% Dial: 60–70%
U.S. senator before election
Ellison D. Smith
Democratic
Elected U.S. Senator
Ellison D. Smith
Democratic

South Carolina U.S. Senate Election, 1926
Party	Candidate	Votes	%
Democratic	Ellison D. Smith (incumbent)	14,560	100.00%
Democratic hold			

== South Dakota ==
1926 United States Senate election in South Dakota
- November 2, 1926
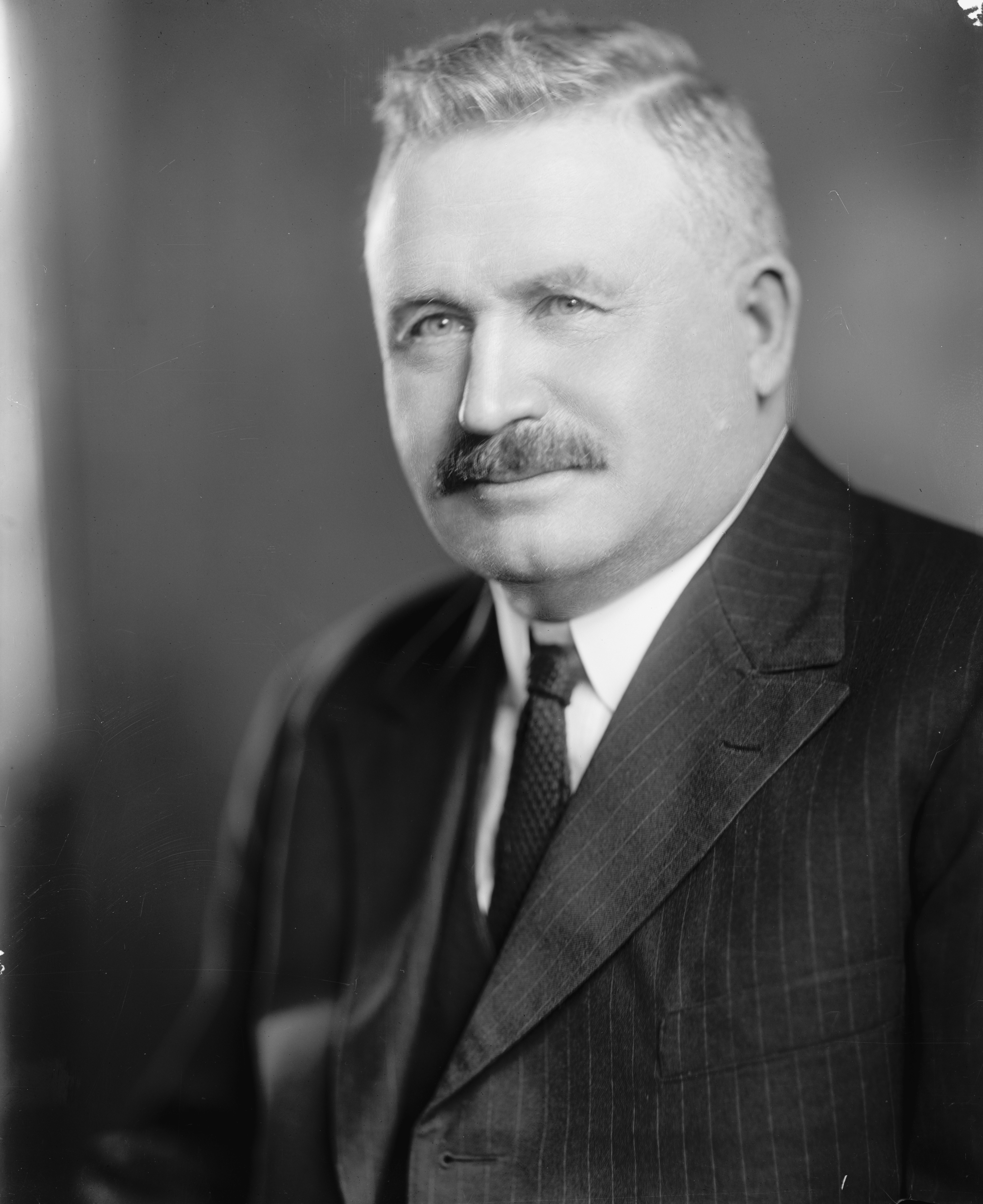

Nominee	Peter Norbeck	Charles J. Gunderson	Howard Platt
Party	Republican	Democratic	Farmer–Labor
Popular vote	105,756	59,128	12,797
Percentage	59.52%	33.28%	7.20%
- County results Norbeck: 40–50% 50–60% 60–70% 70–80% 80–90% Gunderson: 40–50% No Vote
U.S. senator before election
Peter Norbeck
Republican
Elected U.S. Senator
Peter Norbeck
Republican

South Dakota election
Party	Candidate	Votes	%
Republican	Peter Norbeck (incumbent)	105,619	59.57%
Democratic	C. J. Gunderson	59,094	33.33%
Farmer–Labor	Howard Platt	12,584	7.10%
Majority		46,525	26.24%
Turnout		177,297	
Republican hold			

== Utah ==
Utah election

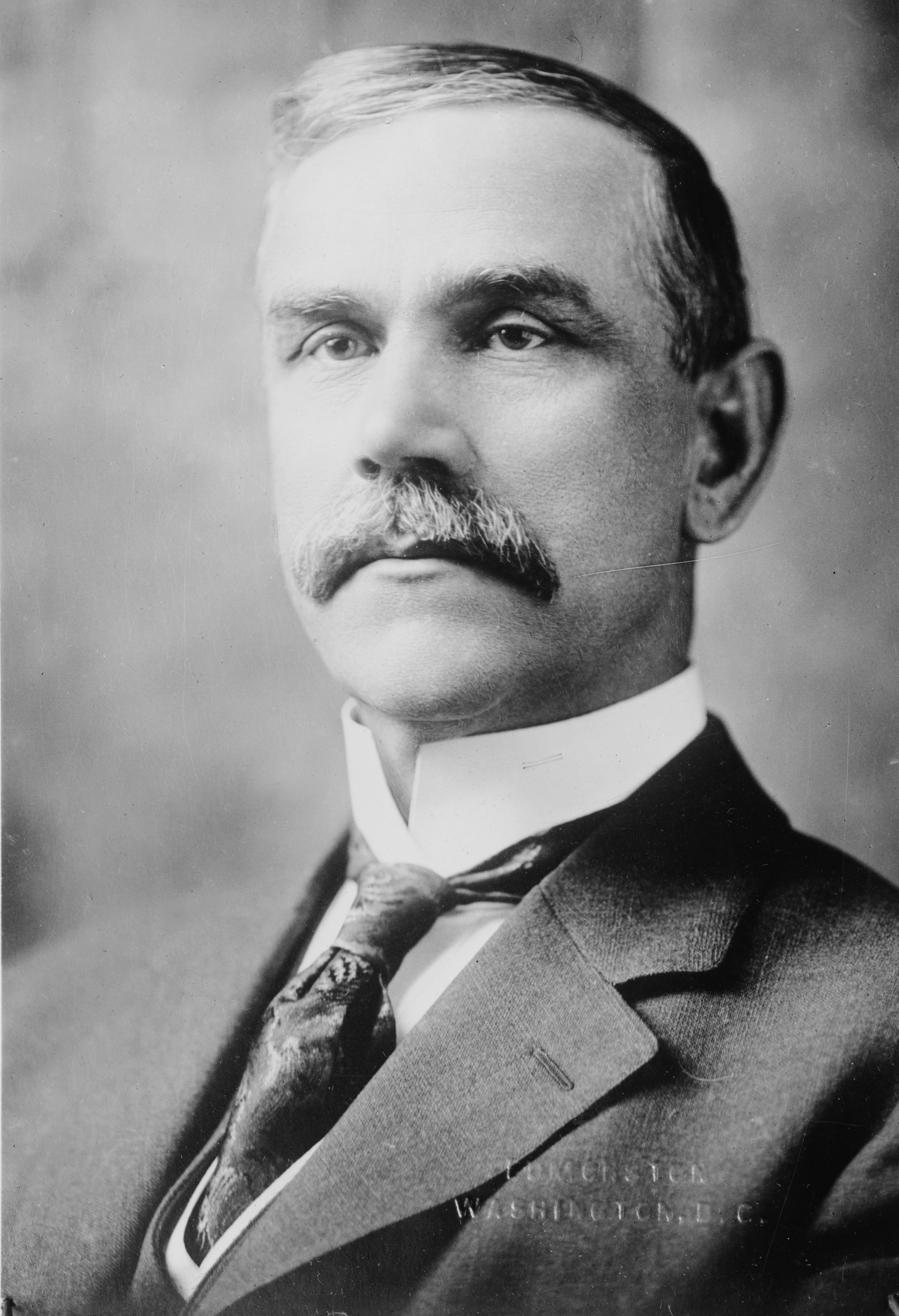

Nominee	Reed Smoot	Ashby Snow
Party	Republican	Democratic
Popular vote	88,101	53,809
Percentage	61.5%	37.6%
- County results Smoot: 50–60% 60–70% 70–80% 80–90% Snow: 50–60%
U.S. senator before election
Reed Smoot
Republican
Elected U.S. senator
Reed Smoot
Republican

Utah election
Party	Candidate	Votes	%
Republican	Reed Smoot (incumbent)	88,101	61.51%
Democratic	Ashby Snow	53,809	37.57%
Socialist	C. T. Stoney	1,310	0.91%
Majority		34,292	23.94%
Turnout		143,220	
Republican hold			

== Vermont ==
1926 United States Senate election in Vermont
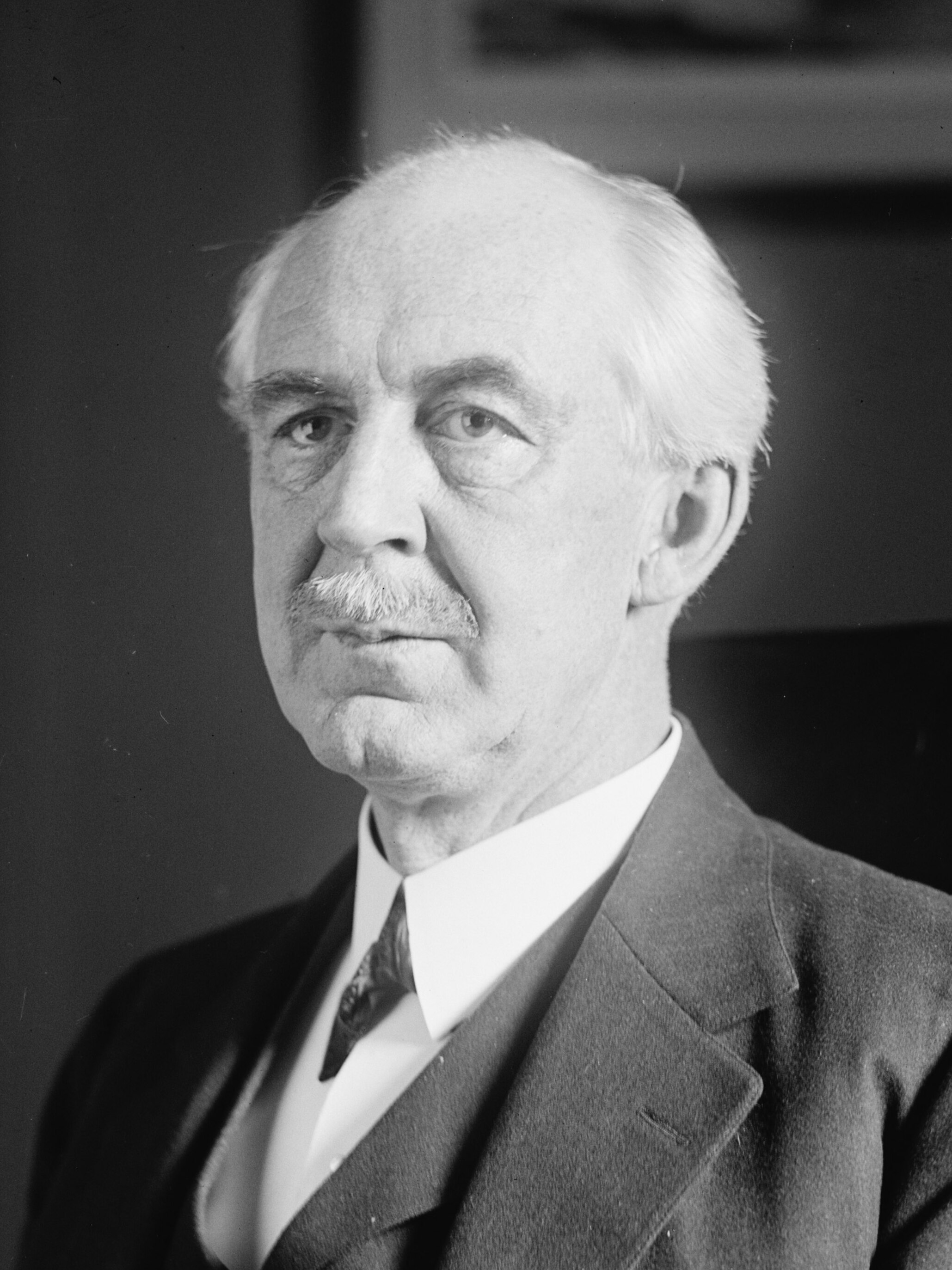

Nominee	Porter H. Dale	James E. Kennedy
Party	Republican	Democratic
Popular vote	52,286	18,890
Percentage	73.4%	26.5%
U.S. senator before election
Porter H. Dale
Republican
Elected U.S. senator
Porter H. Dale
Republican

1926 United States Senate election in Vermont
Party	Candidate	Votes	%
Republican	Porter H. Dale (incumbent)	52,286	73.41%
Democratic	James E. Kennedy	18,890	26.52%
None	Scattering	52	0.07%
Majority		33,396	46.89%
Total votes		71,228	100.00%
Republican hold			

== Washington ==
1926 United States Senate election in Washington
- November 2, 1926
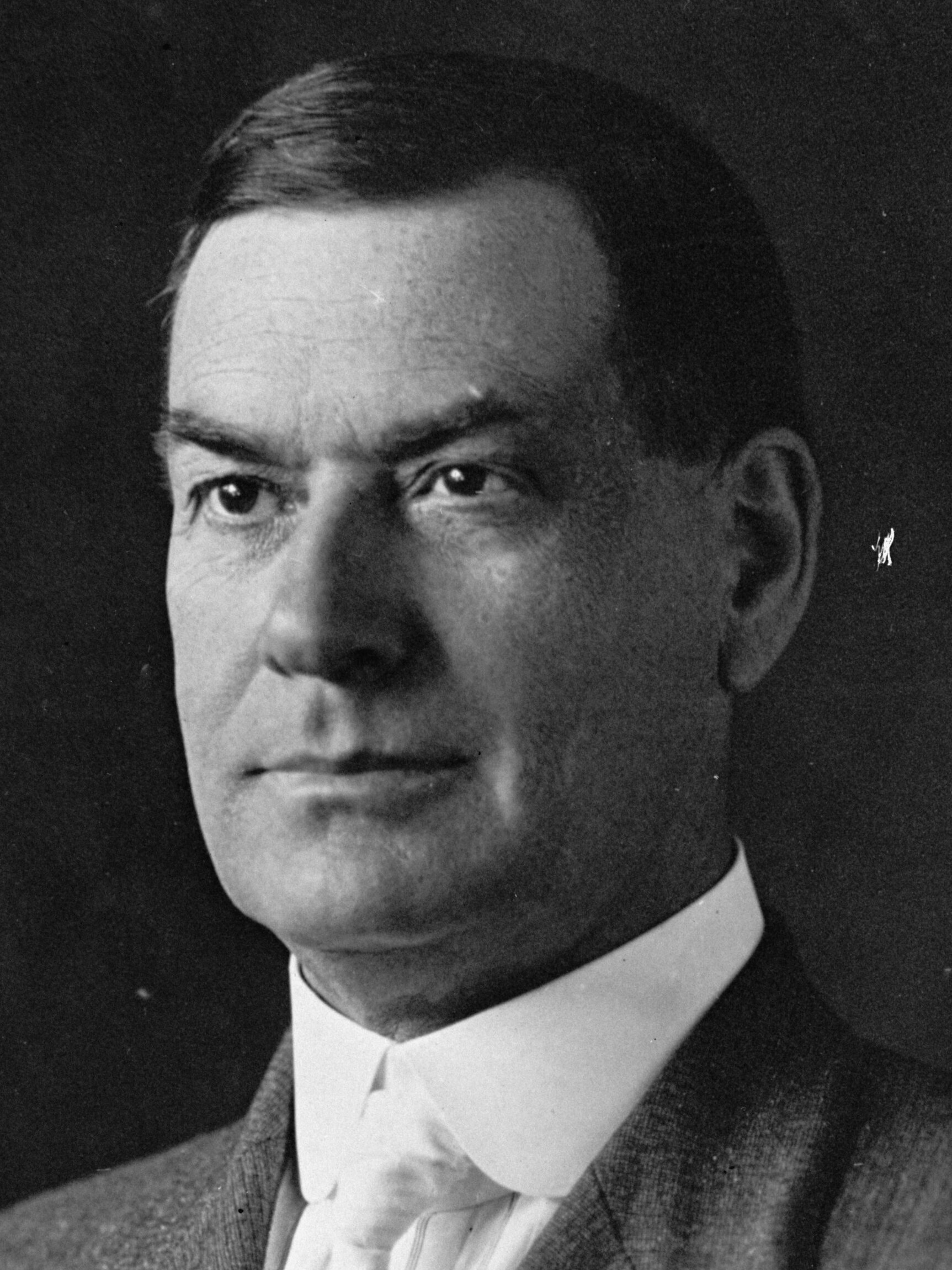

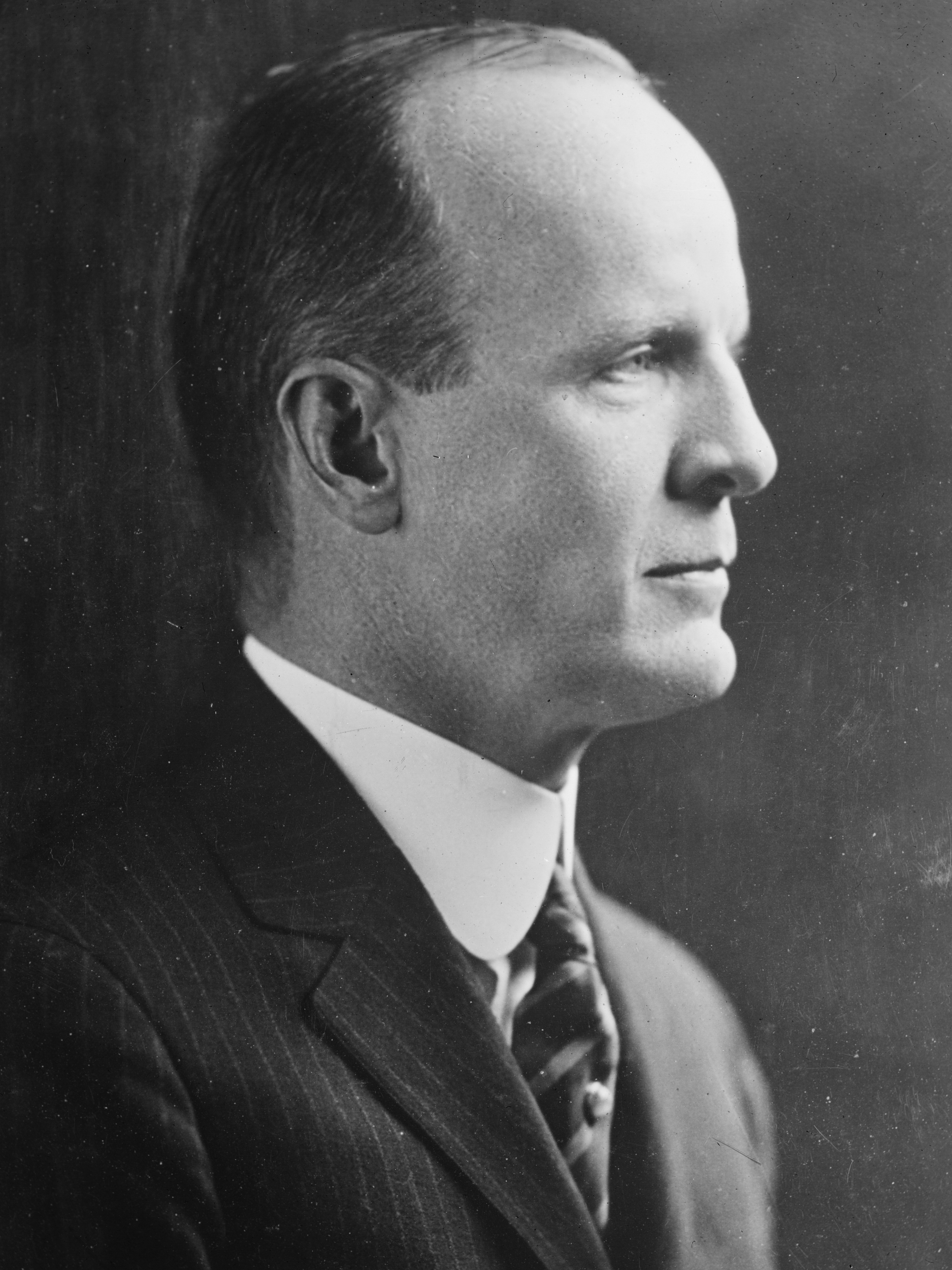
Nominee	Wesley L. Jones	A. Scott Bullitt
Party	Republican	Democratic
Popular vote	164,130	148,783
Percentage	51.31%	46.52%
- County results Jones: 40–50% 50–60% 60–70% 70–80% Bullitt: 50–60%
U.S. senator before election
Wesley Livsey Jones
Republican
Elected U.S. Senator
Wesley Livsey Jones
Republican

Washington election
Party	Candidate	Votes	%
Republican	Wesley Livsey Jones (incumbent)	164,130	51.31%
Democratic	A. Scott Bullitt	148,783	46.51%
Socialist Labor	David Burgess	3,513	1.10%
Farmer–Labor	J. L. Freeman	3,437	1.07%
Majority		15,347	4.80%
Turnout		319,863	
Republican hold			

== Wisconsin ==
Wisconsin election
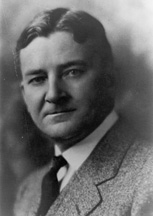

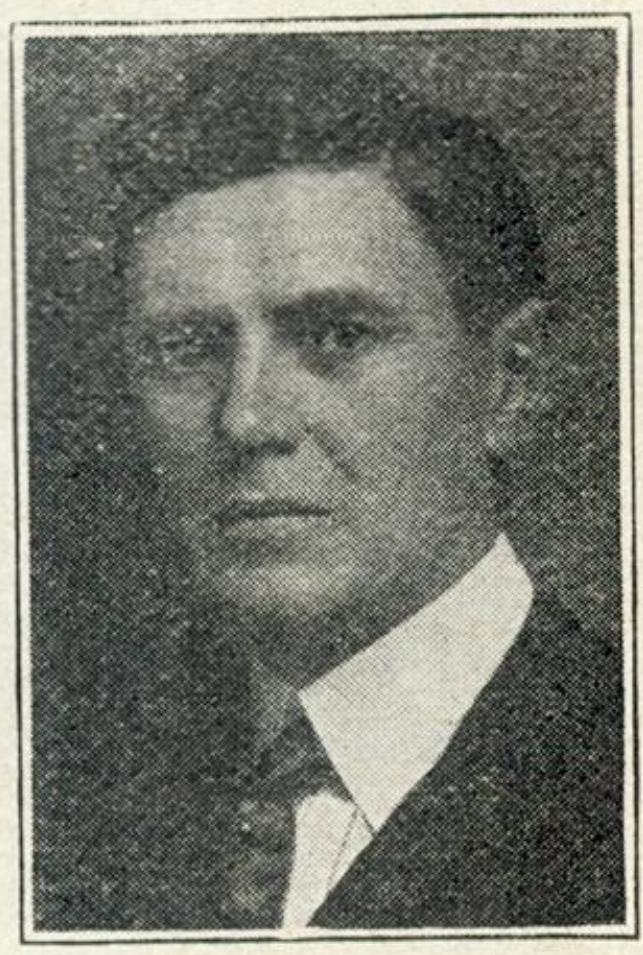

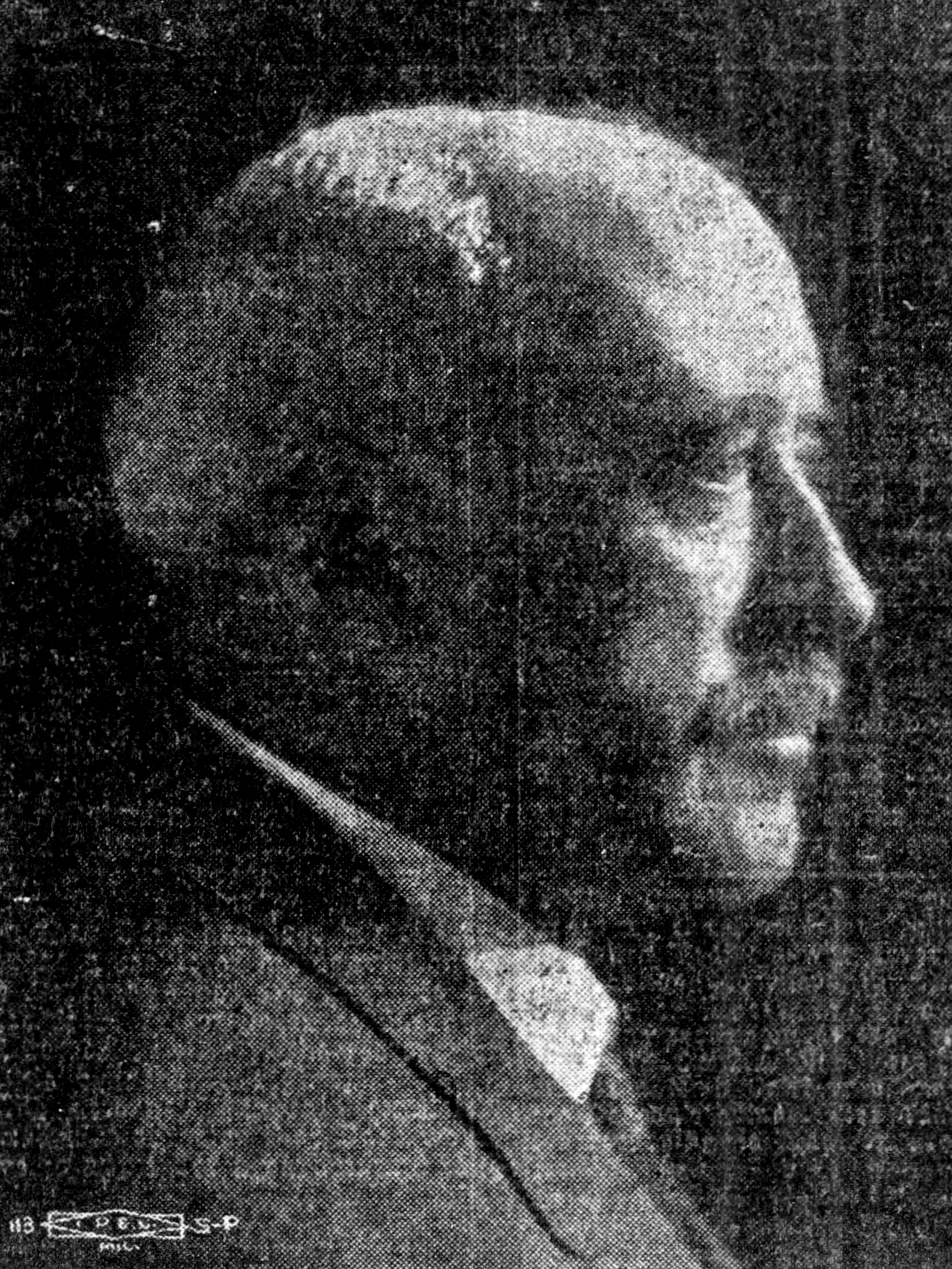

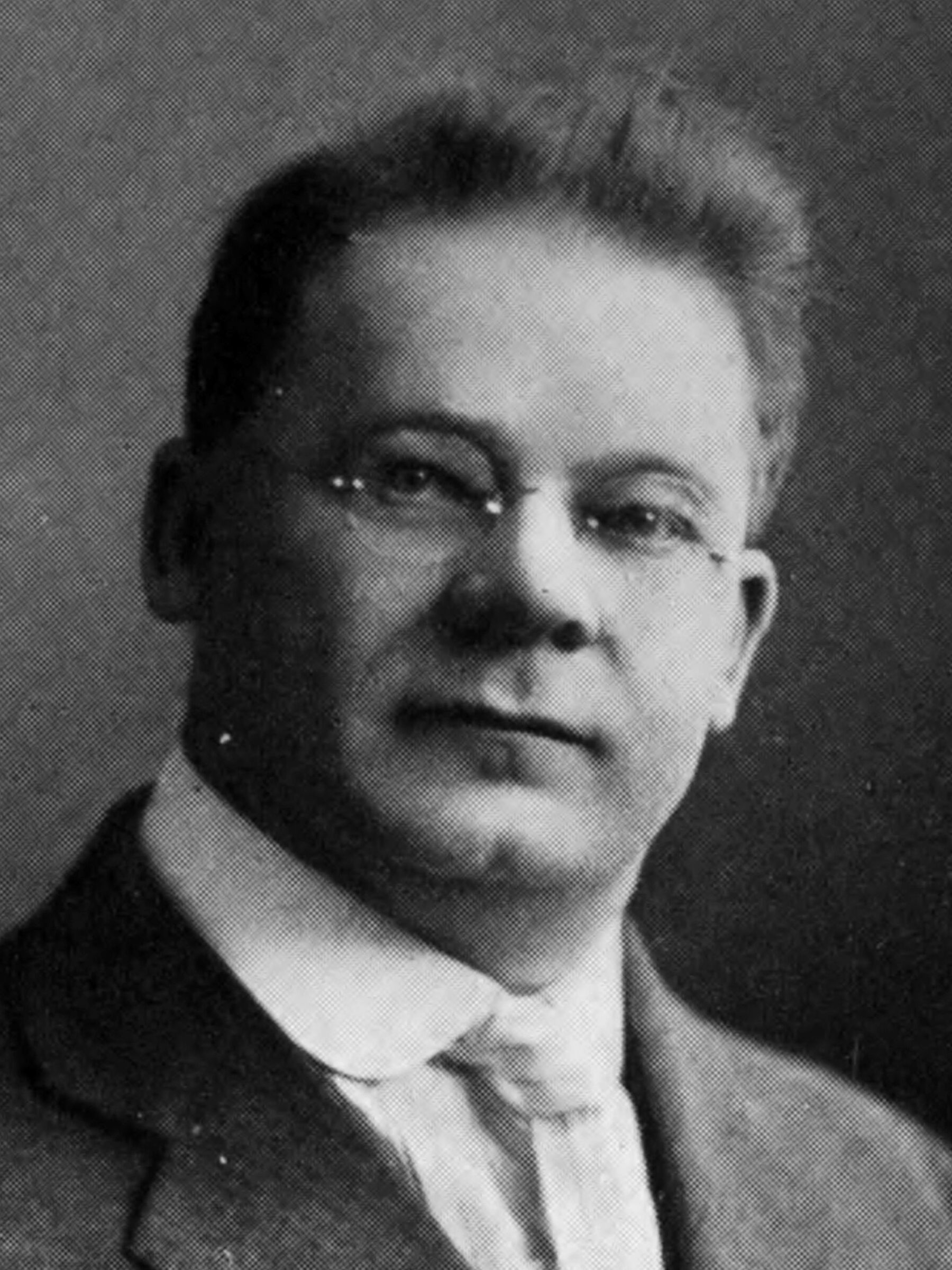
Nominee	John J. Blaine	Charles D. Rosa
Party	Republican	Independent Progressive
Popular vote	299,759	111,122
Percentage	54.9%	20.4%
Nominee	Thomas M. Kearney	Leo Krzycki
Party	Democratic	Socialist
Popular vote	66,672	31,317
Percentage	12.2%	5.7%
- County results Blaine: 40–50% 50–60% 60–70% 70–80% 80–90% Rosa: 40–50% 50–60%
U.S. senator before election
Irvine Lenroot
Republican
Elected U.S. senator
John J. Blaine
Republican

Wisconsin election
Party	Candidate	Votes	%
Republican	John J. Blaine	299,759	54.92%
Independent Progressive	Charles D. Rosa	111,122	20.36%
Democratic	Thomas M. Kearney	66,672	12.22%
Socialist	Leo Krzycki	31,317	5.74%
Independent	J. N. Tittemore	23,822	4.36%
Prohibition	Ella T. Sanford	9,885	1.81%
Independent	Richard Koeppel	3,061	0.56%
None	Scattering	130	0.02%
Majority		188,637	34.56%
Turnout		545,768	
Republican hold			

== See also ==
- 1926 United States elections
  - 1926 United States gubernatorial elections
  - 1926 United States House of Representatives elections
- 69th United States Congress
- 70th United States Congress
