= James Morrison Hawes =

Confederate brigadier general in the American Civil War

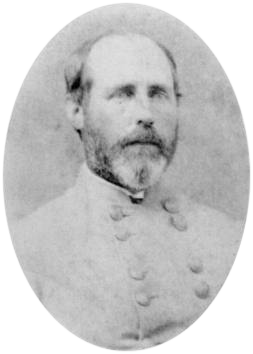
- Born: January 7, 1824; Lexington, Kentucky
- Died: November 22, 1889 (aged 65); Covington, Kentucky
- Burial place: Highland Cemetery, Fort Mitchell, Kentucky
- Relatives: Father, Richard Hawes; Uncle, Albert Gallatin Hawes
- Military career
- Allegiance: United States of America; Confederate States of America
- Branch: United States Army; Confederate States Army
- Service years: 1844–1861 (USA); 1861–1865 (CSA)
- Rank: Captain (USA); Brigadier General (CSA)
- Unit: 2nd U.S. Dragoons
- Commands: Chief of Cavalry, Western Department (CSA)
- Conflicts: Mexican–American War: Siege of Veracruz; Battle of Contreras; Battle of Churubusco; Battle of Molino del Rey; Utah Expedition; American Civil War: Battle of Shiloh; Battle of Vicksburg; Battle of Milliken's Bend; Battle of Young's Point
- Other work: Hardware merchant

James Morrison Hawes (January 7, 1824 – November 22, 1889) was a Confederate general during the American Civil War.

== Early life ==
James M. Hawes was born in Lexington, Kentucky, the son of Richard and Hettie Nicholas Hawes. The Hawes family was politically prominent. Hawes' father Richard Hawes, uncle Albert Gallatin Hawes, great-uncle Aylett Hawes, and cousin Aylett Hawes Buckner all served in the United States House of Representatives. James Hawes did not follow the family tradition, however, and enrolled at the United States Military Academy on July 1, 1841. He graduated four years later with the rank of second lieutenant of dragoons.

== U.S. military service ==
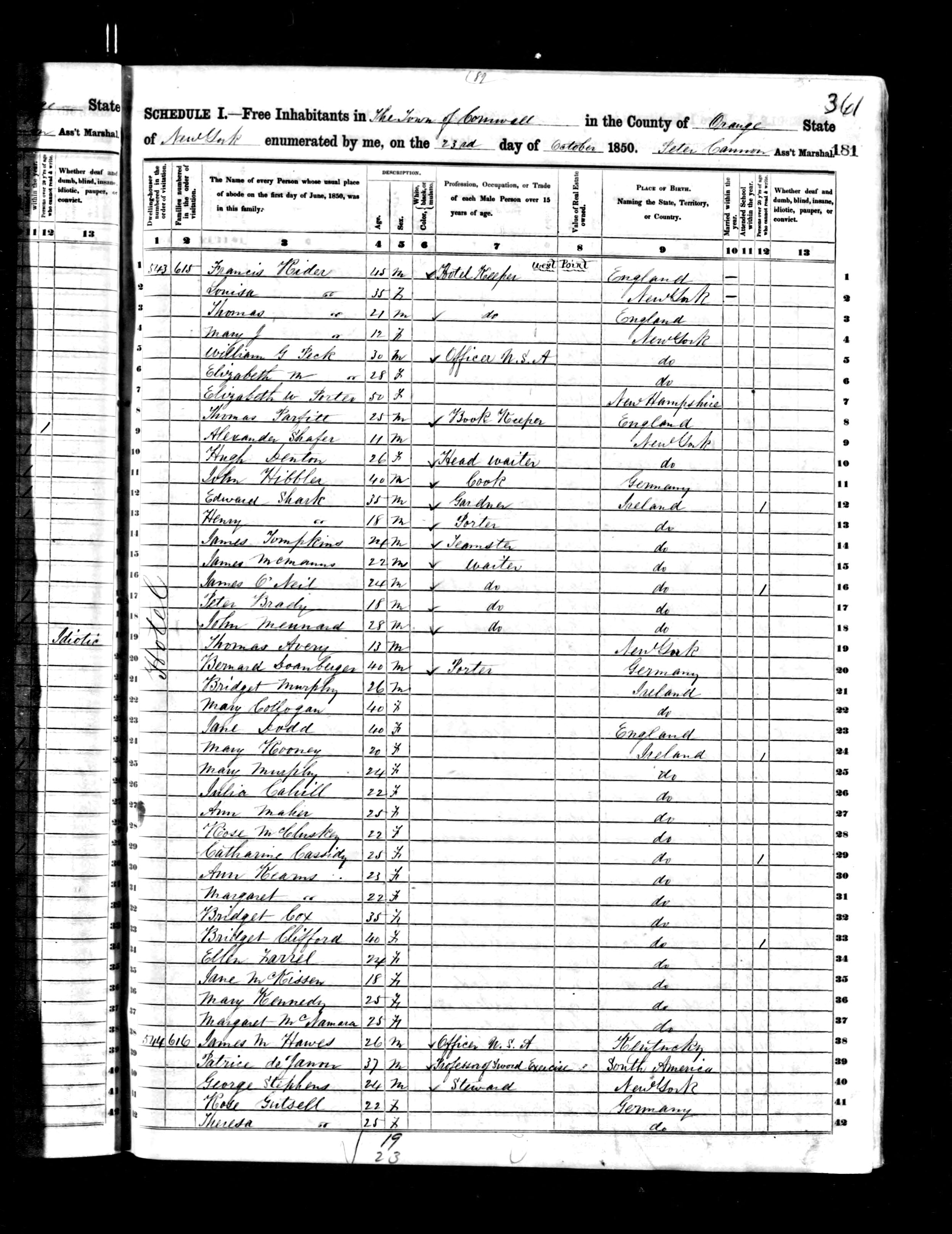
The 1850 census, prior to Hawes's resignation from the US Army; his profession reads "Officer, U.S.A."

Upon graduation, Hawes was assigned to assist with the occupation of Texas. When war broke out with Mexico, Hawes participated in the Siege of Veracruz, and the battles of Contreras, Churubusco, and Molino del Rey. His outstanding service earned him a brevet to the rank of first lieutenant.

Following his service in the U.S.-Mexican War, Hawes became an assistant instructor at the U.S. Military Academy. Among the subjects he taught were infantry tactics, cavalry tactics, and mathematics. In 1850, he studied advanced tactics at the Cavalry School of Saumur, France. On his return to the United States in 1852, Hawes was stationed on the Texas frontier, served in the Utah expedition in 1857 and 1858, and helped put down disturbances in "Bleeding Kansas".

On February 3, 1857, Hawes married Maria Southgate at Christ Church in Cincinnati, Ohio. The couple had 10 children.

== Confederate military service ==
With the outbreak of the Civil War in 1861, Hawes resigned his position in the U.S. Army to accept a commission as a captain in the 2nd Kentucky Cavalry. On June 16, 1861, Hawes was promoted to the rank of major, and ten days later was promoted to colonel. He later resigned this position to be commissioned a major in the regular Confederate Army.

Records show that Hawes participated in a charge on Charleston, West Virginia, on July 4, 1861, and helped defend a bridge on the Green River near Bowling Green on September 18, 1861.

On March 5, 1862, Hawes was promoted to brigadier general at the request of Albert Sidney Johnston. He became the cavalry commander of the Confederate Western Department.

Following the Battle of Shiloh, Hawes asked to be relieved of command and was assigned to a brigade under John C. Breckinridge. Kentucky's Confederate governor George W. Johnson was killed at the Battle of Shiloh, and the shadow government's legislative council chose Hawes' father Richard to succeed Johnson.

He was dispatched to Little Rock, Arkansas in October 1862 to serve as head of the cavalry brigade under Theophilus H. Holmes. Later, he served in the engagements at the Battle of Milliken's Bend and the Battle of Young's Point in June 1863 in Louisiana and then in Mobile, Alabama, aided the defense of Vicksburg, Mississippi, and finished his Confederate military service in Galveston, Texas.

== Later life and death ==
Following the Civil War, Hawes and his wife returned to their destroyed home in Paris, Kentucky. They relocated to Covington, Kentucky in 1866, where Hawes became a hardware merchant. He still resisted the family tradition of a political career, possibly because of improprieties committed by his brother, Smith Hawes, while he was city treasurer.

Later in life, Hawes became known for decorating Confederate graves on Confederate Memorial Day. Hawes died at his home on November 22, 1889. His cause of death was listed as age and cerebritis. In January 1925, the United Daughters of the Confederacy honored Hawes with a service cross medal, which his grandson accepted on his behalf.

== See also ==
- List of American Civil War generals (Confederate)
