= Hawes (surname) =

Hawes is an English surname. Notable people with the surname include:

== Arts and entertainment ==
- Hampton Hawes (1928–1977), African American jazz pianist
- James Hawes, the director and producer
- John Hawes (1876–1956), architect and priest
- Keeley Hawes (b. 1976), English actress
- Patrick Hawes (b. 1958), British composer
- Stanley Hawes (1905–1991), British documentary film producer and director
- William Hawes (1785–1846), English musician

== Authors ==
- Charles Boardman Hawes (1889–1923), American writer
- Gilbert Ray Hawes (1854–1923), American lawyer, academic, and writer
- James Hawes (b. 1960), British novelist
- Louise Hawes, American academic and author
- Mary Jane Holmes (1825–1907), American novelist
- Mary Virginia Hawes Terhune (1830–1922), wrote under the penname Marion Harland
- Peter Hawes (1947–2018), New Zealand playwright, novelist, and scriptwriter
- Stephen Hawes (c. 1474 – 1523), English poet during the Tudor period

== Military ==
- James Morrison Hawes (1824–1889), 19th century brigadier general in the Confederate States Army during the American Civil War
- Richard E. Hawes (1894–1968), 20th century United States naval officer

== Politicians ==
- Albert Gallatin Hawes, 19th-century U.S. representative from Kentucky
- Aylett Hawes, 19th-century American politician and planter from Virginia
- Aylett Hawes Buckner, 19th-century U.S. representative from Missouri
- Sir Benjamin Hawes, 19th-century British Whig politician, known in UK parliament as "Hawes the Soap-Boiler"
- Harry Bartow Hawes, 20th-century Democratic member of the U.S. House and the U.S. Senate from Missouri
- Richard Hawes, 19th-century United States representative from Kentucky and second Confederate governor of Kentucky
- William Hawes (1772 - after 1850), business owner and member of the Maine House of Representatives

== Sportspeople ==
- Ben Hawes (born 1980), English field hockey player
- Emma Jean Hawes (1912–1987), American bridge player
- Jackson Hawes (born 2000), American football player
- Matthew Hawes (born 1986), Canadian backstroke swimmer
- Spencer Hawes (born 1988), American basketball player
- Steven Sherburne Hawes (born 1950), American basketball player

== Other people ==
- Harriet Boyd Hawes (1871–1945), pioneering American archaeologist, nurse and relief worker
- Jason Hawes (b. 1971), co-founder of The Atlantic Paranormal Society (TAPS), based in Warwick, Rhode Island
- Rodney A. Hawes Jr. (b. 1939), American business executive and philanthropist.
