= Haws =

Haws is a surname. Notable people with the surname include:

- John Henry Hobart Haws (1809–1858), United States Representative from New York
- Kurt Haws (born 1969), former American football tight end
- Larry Haws (1940–2012), U.S. politician from Minnesota
- Tyler Haws (born 1991), American basketball player

== See also ==
- Haw (disambiguation)
- Hawes (disambiguation)
