= Confederate government of Kentucky =

Government of Kentucky in exile (1861–1865)

Commonwealth of Kentucky
- 1861–1865
- Flag Coat (Note: Seal of the provisional government of Kentucky, showing an arm holding the 13th star of the Confederacy. The motto voce populi is Latin for "by the voice of the people".)
- Motto: voce populi "by the voice of the people"
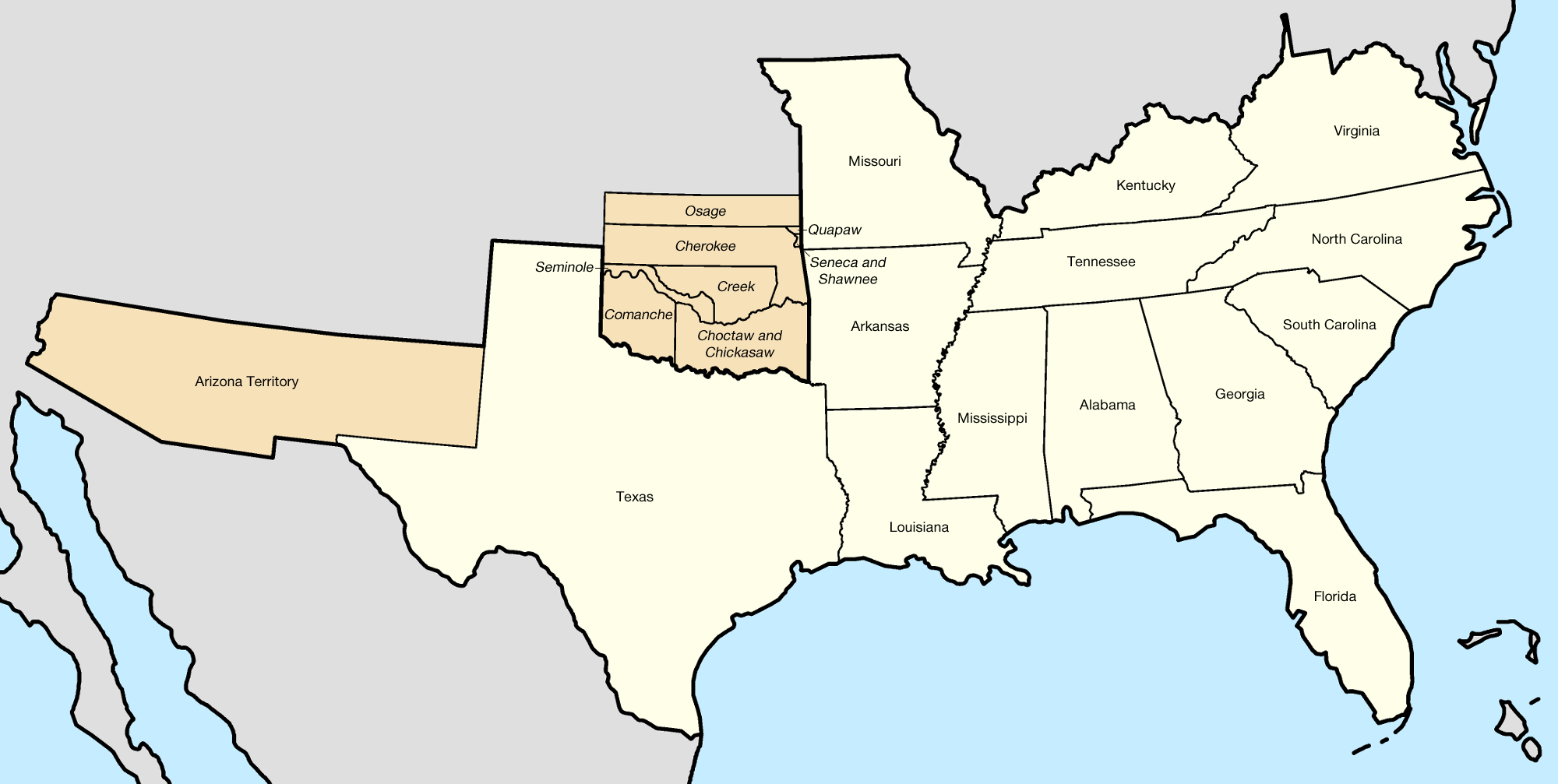
- Status: Confederate state
- Capital: Bowling Green, Kentucky (1861); Frankfort (1862)
- Government: Single-executive system Provisional government
- Governor
  - 1861–1862: George W. Johnson
  - 1862–1865: Richard Hawes
- History
  - Seccession: 28 November 1861
  - Joined Confederate: December 10, 1861
  - Battle of Barbourville: September 19, 1861
  - Confederate Heartland Offensive: August 14–October 10, 1862
  - Battle of Paducah: March 25, 1864
  - Battle of Cynthiana: June 11–12, 1864
  - Dissolution: 1865
- Currency: CSA dollar
- Today part of: Kentucky

The Confederate government of Kentucky was a government-in-exile established for the Commonwealth of Kentucky by a self-constituted group of Confederate sympathizers and delegates sent by Kentucky counties, during the American Civil War. The shadow government never replaced the elected government in Frankfort, in which the state legislature had strong Union sympathies while the governor was pro-Confederate. Neither was it able to gain the whole support of Kentucky's citizens; its jurisdiction extended only as far as Confederate battle lines in the Commonwealth, which at its greatest extent in 1861 and early 1862 encompassed over half the state. Nevertheless, the provisional government was recognized by the Confederate States of America, and Kentucky was admitted to the Confederacy on December 10, 1861. Kentucky, the final state admitted to the Confederacy, was represented by the 13th (central) star on the Confederate battle flag.

Bowling Green, Kentucky, was designated the Confederate capital of Kentucky at a convention in nearby Russellville. Due to the military situation in the state, the provisional government was exiled and traveled with the Army of Tennessee for most of its existence. For a short time in the autumn of 1862, the Confederate Army controlled Frankfort, the only time a Union capital was captured by Confederate forces. During this occupation, General Braxton Bragg attempted to install the provisional government as the permanent authority in the Commonwealth. However, Union General Don Carlos Buell ambushed the inauguration ceremony and drove the provisional government from the state for the final time. From that point forward, the government existed primarily on paper and was dissolved at the end of the war.

The provisional government elected two governors. George W. Johnson was elected at the Russellville Convention and served until his death at the Battle of Shiloh. Richard Hawes was elected to replace Johnson and served through the remainder of the war.

== Background ==
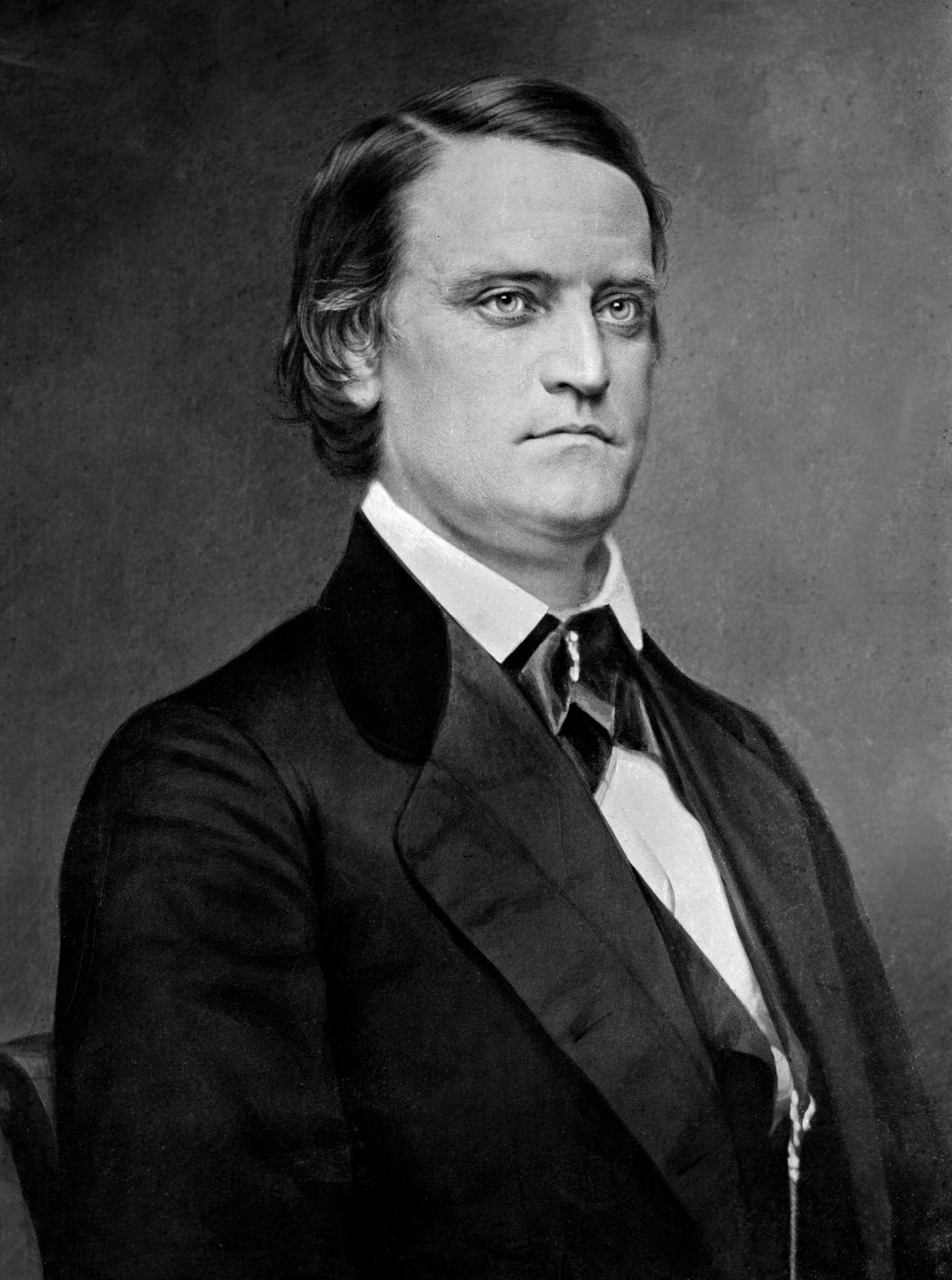
Kentucky senator and 1860 Presidential candidate John Breckinridge represented the states' rights position.

Kentucky's citizens were split regarding the issues central to the Civil War. The state had strong economic ties with Ohio River cities such as Pittsburgh and Cincinnati while at the same time sharing many cultural, social, and economic links with the South. Unionist traditions were strong throughout the Commonwealth's history, especially in the east. With economic ties to both the North and the South, Kentucky had little to gain and much to lose from a war between the states. Additionally, many slaveholders felt that the best protection for slavery was within the Union.

The presidential election of 1860 showed Kentucky's mixed sentiments when the state gave John Bell 45% of the popular vote, John C. Breckinridge 36%, Stephen Douglas 18%, and Abraham Lincoln less than 1%. Historian Allan Nevins interpreted the election results to mean that Kentuckians strongly opposed both secession and coercion against the secessionists. The majority coalition of Bell and Douglas supporters was seen as a solid moderate Unionist position that opposed precipitate action by extremists on either side.

The majority of Kentucky's citizens believed the state should be a mediator between the North and South. On December 9, 1860, Kentucky Governor Beriah Magoffin sent a letter to the other slave state governors, suggesting that they come to an agreement with the North that would include strict enforcement of the Fugitive Slave Act, a division of common territories at the 37th parallel, a guarantee of free use of the Mississippi River, and a Southern veto over slave legislation. Magoffin proposed a conference of slave states, followed by a conference of all the states to secure the concessions. Because of the escalating pace of events, neither conference was held.

Governor Magoffin called a special session of the Kentucky General Assembly on December 27, 1860, to ask the legislators for a convention to decide the Commonwealth's course in the sectional conflict. The Louisville Morning Courier on January 25, 1861, articulated the position that the secessionists faced in the legislature, "Too much time has already been wasted. The historic moment once past, never returns. For us and for Kentucky, the time to act is NOW OR NEVER." The Unionists, on the other hand, were unwilling to surrender the fate of the state to a convention that might "in a moment of excitement, adopt the extreme remedy of secession." The Unionist position carried after many of the states rights' legislators, opposing the idea of immediate secession, voted against the convention. The assembly did, however, send six delegates to a February 4 Peace Conference in Washington, D.C., and asked Congress to call a national convention to consider potential resolutions to the secession crisis, including the Crittenden Compromise, proposed by Kentuckian John J. Crittenden.

As a result of the firing on Fort Sumter, President Lincoln sent a telegram to Governor Magoffin requesting that the Commonwealth supply four regiments as its share of the overall request of 75,000 troops for the war. Magoffin, a Confederate sympathizer, replied, "President Lincoln, Washington, D.C. I will send not a man nor a dollar for the wicked purpose of subduing my sister Southern states. B. Magoffin." Both houses of the General Assembly met on May 7 and passed declarations of neutrality in the war, a position officially declared by Governor Magoffin on May 20.

In a special congressional election held June 20, Unionist candidates won nine of Kentucky's ten congressional seats. Confederate sympathizers won only the Jackson Purchase region, which was economically linked to Tennessee by the Cumberland and Tennessee Rivers. Believing defeat at the polls was certain, many Southern Rightists had boycotted the election; of the 125,000 votes cast, Unionists captured close to 90,000. Confederate sympathizers were dealt a further blow in the August 5 election for state legislators. This election resulted in veto-proof Unionist majorities of 75–25 in the House and 27–11 in the Senate. From then on, most of Magoffin's vetoes to protect southern interests were overridden in the General Assembly.

1861 Kentucky House of Representatives election Union Democratic Party (75) States' Rights Party (25)

Historian Wilson Porter Shortridge made the following analysis:

These elections demonstrated that a majority of the people of Kentucky were opposed to secession, but they could not be interpreted as an approval of the war policy of the Lincoln administration, as was quite generally done at the north at that time. Perhaps the best explanation at that time was that the people of Kentucky desired peace and thought that the election of the union candidates was the best way to get it.

With secession no longer considered a viable option, the pro-Confederate forces became the strongest supporters for neutrality. Unionists dismissed this as a front for a secessionist agenda. Unionists, on the other hand, struggled to find a way to move the large, moderate middle to a "definite and unqualified stand with the Washington government." The maneuvering between the two reached a decisive point on September 3 when Confederate forces were ordered from Tennessee to the Kentucky towns of Hickman and Columbus. Union forces responded by occupying Paducah.

On September 11, the legislature passed a resolution instructing Magoffin to order the Confederate forces (but not the Union forces) to leave the state. The Governor vetoed the resolution, but the General Assembly overrode his veto, and Magoffin gave the order. The next week, the assembly officially requested the assistance of the Union and asked the governor to call out the state militia to join the Federal forces. Magoffin also vetoed this request. Again the assembly overrode his veto and Magoffin acquiesced.

== Formation ==
A pro-Confederate peace meeting, with Breckinridge as a speaker, was scheduled for September 21. Unionists feared the meeting would lead to actual military resistance, and dispatched troops from Camp Dick Robinson to disband the meeting and arrest Breckinridge. Breckinridge, as well as many other state leaders identified with the secessionists, fled the state. These leaders eventually served as the nucleus for a group that would create a shadow government for Kentucky. In his October 8 "Address to the People of Kentucky," Breckinridge declared, "The United States no longer exists. The Union is dissolved."

On October 29, 1861, 63 delegates representing 34 counties met at Russellville to discuss the formation of a Confederate government for the Commonwealth. Despite its defeats at the polls, this group believed that the Unionist government in Frankfort did not represent the will of the majority of Kentucky's citizens. Trigg County's Henry Burnett was elected chairman of the proceedings. Scott County farmer George W. Johnson chaired the committee that wrote the convention's final report and introduced some of its key resolutions. The report called for a sovereignty convention to sever ties with the Federal government. Both Breckinridge and Johnson served on the Committee of Ten that arranged the convention.

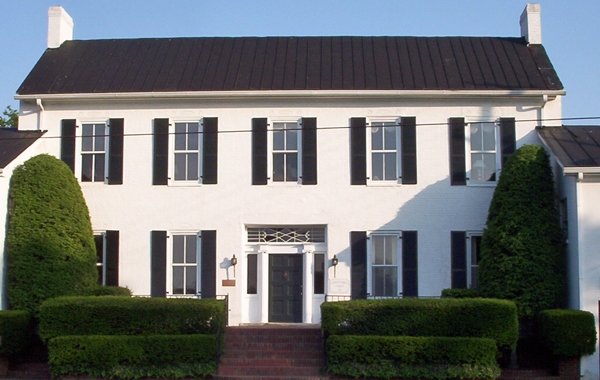
The William Forst House in Russellville

On November 18, 116 delegates from 68 counties met at the William Forst House in Russellville. Burnett was elected presiding officer. Fearing for the safety of the delegates, he first proposed postponing proceedings until January 8, 1862. Johnson convinced the majority of the delegates to continue. By the third day, the military situation was so tenuous that the entire convention had to be moved to a tower on the campus of Bethel Female College, a now-defunct institution in Hopkinsville.

The first item was ratification of an ordinance of secession, which proceeded in short order. Next, being unable to flesh out a complete constitution and system of laws, the delegates voted that "the Constitution and laws of Kentucky, not inconsistent with the acts of this Convention, and the establishment of this Government, and the laws which may be enacted by the Governor and Council, shall be the laws of this state." The delegates proposed a provisional government to consist of a legislative council of ten members (one from each Kentucky congressional district); a governor, who had the power to appoint judicial and other officials; a treasurer; and an auditor. The delegates designated Bowling Green (then under the control of Confederate general Albert Sidney Johnston) as the Confederate State capital, but had the foresight to provide for the government to meet anywhere deemed appropriate by the council and governor. The convention adopted a new state seal, an arm wearing mail with a star, extended from a circle of twelve other stars.

Officials of the Confederate government of Kentucky
Position	Officeholder
Governor	George W. Johnson
Lieutenant Governor	Horatio F. Simrall
Secretary of State	Robert McKee
Treasurer	Theodore Legrand Burnett
Auditor	Josiah Pillsbury

The convention unanimously elected Johnson as governor. Horatio F. Simrall was elected lieutenant governor, but soon fled to Mississippi to escape Federal authorities. Robert McKee, who had served as secretary of both conventions, was appointed secretary of state. Theodore Legrand Burnett was elected treasurer, but resigned on December 17 to accept a position in the Confederate Congress. He was replaced by Warren County native John Quincy Burnham. The position of auditor was first offered to former Congressman Richard Hawes, but Hawes declined to continue his military service under Humphrey Marshall. In his stead, the convention elected Josiah Pillsbury, also of Warren County. The legislative council elected Willis Benson Machen as its president.

On November 21, the day following the convention, Johnson wrote Confederate president Jefferson Davis to request Kentucky's admission to the Confederacy. Burnett, William Preston, and William E. Simms were chosen as the state's commissioners to the Confederacy. For reasons unexplained by the delegates, Dr. Luke P. Blackburn, a native Kentuckian living in Mississippi, was invited to accompany the commissioners to Richmond, Virginia. Though Davis had reservations about circumvention of the elected General Assembly in forming the Confederate government, he concluded that Johnson's request had merit, and on November 25, recommended Kentucky for admission to the Confederacy. Kentucky was admitted to the Confederacy on December 10, 1861.

== Activity ==
On November 26, 1861, Governor Johnson issued an address to the citizens of the Commonwealth blaming abolitionists for the breakup of the United States. He asserted his belief that the Union and Confederacy were forces of equal strength, and that the only solution to the war was a free trade agreement between the two sovereign nations. He further announced his willingness to resign as provisional governor if the Kentucky General Assembly would agree to cooperate with Governor Magoffin. Magoffin himself denounced the Russellville Convention and the provisional government, stressing the need to abide by the will of the majority of the Commonwealth's citizens.

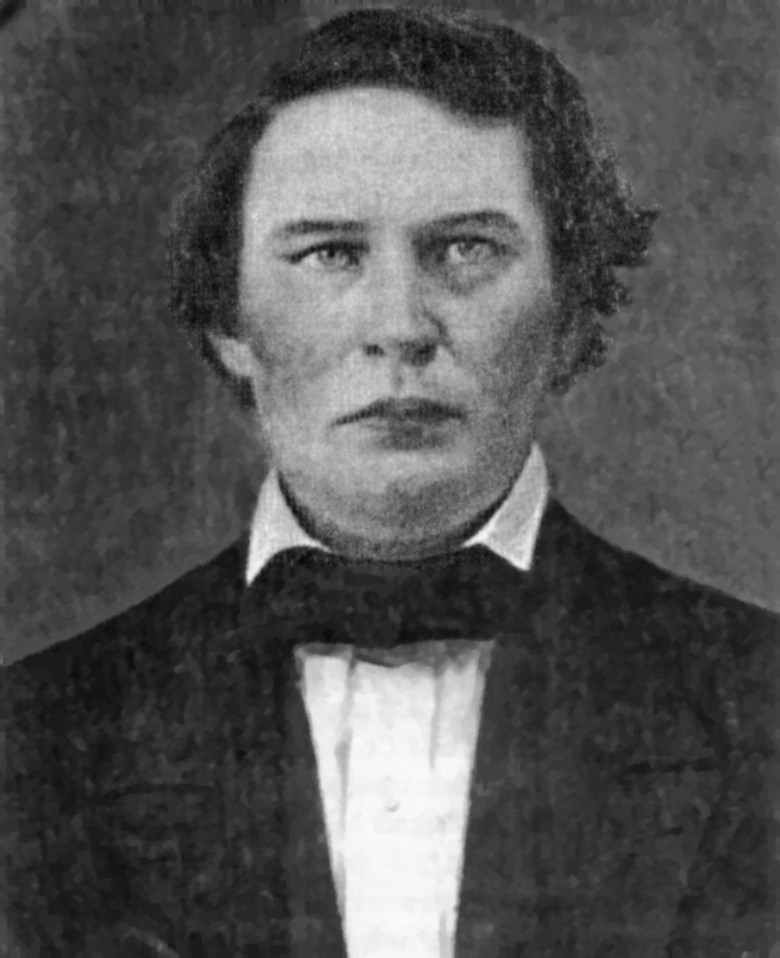
George W. Johnson, the first Confederate governor of Kentucky

During the winter of 1861, Johnson tried to assert the legitimacy of the fledgling government but its jurisdiction extended only as far as the area controlled by the Confederate Army which at its height was over half the state. Johnson came short of raising the 46,000 troops requested by the Confederate Congress. Efforts to levy taxes and to compel citizens to turn over their guns to the government were similarly unsuccessful. On January 3, 1862, Johnson requested a sum of $3 million ($97 million as of 2025) from the Confederate Congress to meet the provisional government's operating expenses. The Congress instead approved a sum of $2 million, the expenditure of which required approval of Secretary of War Judah P. Benjamin and President Davis. Much of the provisional government's operating capital was probably provided by Kentucky congressman Eli Metcalfe Bruce, who made a fortune from varied economic activities throughout the war.

The council met on December 14 to appoint representatives to the Confederacy's unicameral provisional congress. Those appointed would serve for only two months, as the provisional congress was replaced with a permanent bicameral legislature on February 17, 1862. Kentucky was entitled to two senators and 12 representatives in the permanent Confederate Congress. The usual day for general elections being passed, Governor Johnson and the legislative council set election day for Confederate Kentucky on January 22. Voters were allowed to vote in whichever county they occupied on election day, and could cast a general ballot for all positions. In an election that saw military votes outnumber civilian ones, only four of the provisional legislators were elected to seats in the Confederate House of Representatives. One provisional legislator, Henry Burnett, was elected to the Confederate Senate.

The provisional government took other minor actions during the winter of 1861. An act was passed to rename Wayne County to Zollicoffer County in honor of Felix Zollicoffer, who died at the Battle of Mill Springs. Local officials were appointed in areas controlled by Confederate forces, including many justices of the peace. When the Confederate government eventually disbanded, the legality of marriages performed by these justices was questioned, but eventually upheld.

=== Withdrawal from Kentucky and death of Governor Johnson ===
Following Ulysses S. Grant's victory at the Battle of Fort Henry, General Johnston withdrew from Bowling Green into Tennessee on February 7, 1862. A week later, Governor Johnson and the provisional government followed. On March 12, the New Orleans Picayune reported that "the capital of Kentucky [is] now being located in a Sibley tent."

Governor Johnson, despite his presumptive official position, his age (50), and a crippled arm, volunteered to serve under Breckinridge and Colonel Robert P. Trabue at the Battle of Shiloh. On April 7, Johnson was severely wounded in the thigh and abdomen, and lay on the battlefield until the following day. Johnson was recognized and helped by acquaintance and fellow Freemason, Alexander McDowell McCook, a Union general. However, Johnson died aboard the Union hospital ship Hannibal, and his body was shipped back to his native Georgetown, Kentucky, packed in salt.

=== Richard Hawes as governor ===
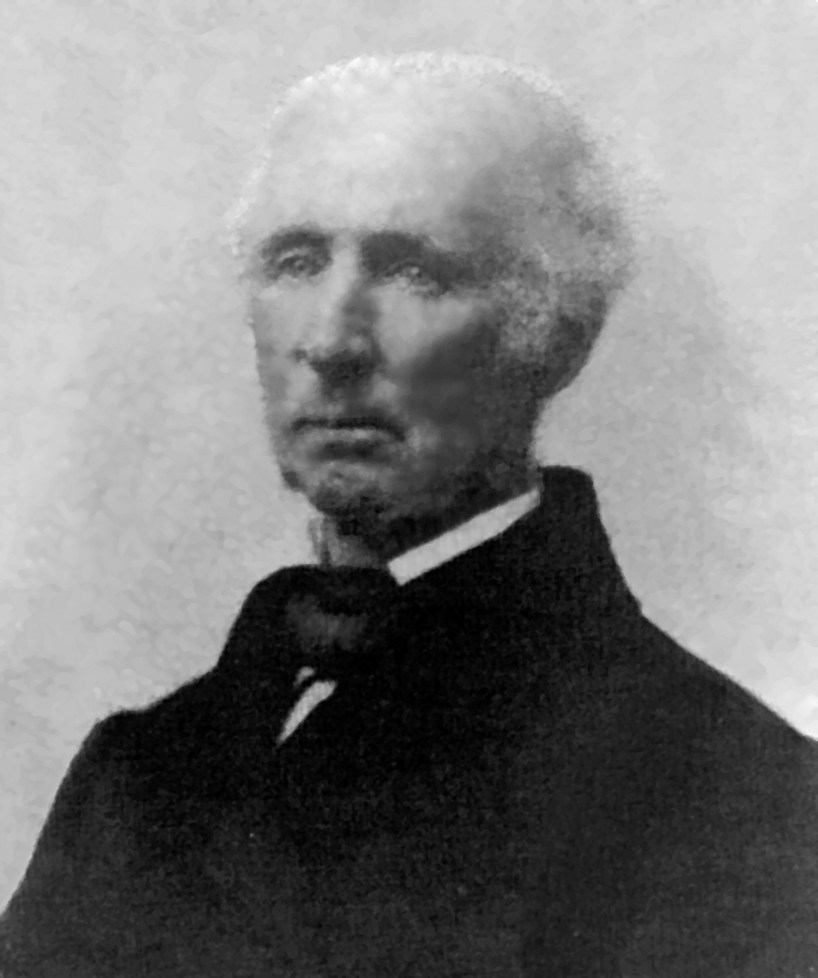
Richard Hawes, the second Confederate governor of Kentucky

Prior to abandoning Bowling Green, Governor Johnson requested that Richard Hawes come to the city and help with the administration of the government, but Hawes was delayed due to a bout with typhoid fever. Following Johnson's death, the provisional government elected Hawes, who was still recovering from his illness, as governor. Following his recovery, Hawes joined the government in Corinth, Mississippi, and took the oath of office on May 31.

During the summer of 1862, word began to spread through the Army of Tennessee that Generals Bragg and Edmund Kirby Smith were planning an invasion of Kentucky. The legislative council voted to endorse the invasion plan, and on August 27, Governor Hawes was dispatched to Richmond to favorably recommend it to President Davis. Davis was non-committal, but Bragg and Smith proceeded, nonetheless.

On August 30, Smith commanded one of the most complete Confederate victories of the war against an inexperienced Union force at the Battle of Richmond. Bragg also won a decisive victory at the September 13 Battle of Munfordville, but the delay there cost him the larger prize of Louisville, which Don Carlos Buell moved to occupy on September 25. Having lost Louisville, Bragg spread his troops into defensive postures in the central Kentucky cities of Bardstown, Shelbyville and Danville and waited for something to happen, a move that historian Kenneth W. Noe called a "stupendously illogical decision".

Meanwhile, the leaders of Kentucky's Confederate government had remained in Chattanooga, Tennessee, awaiting Governor Hawes' return. They finally departed on September 18, and caught up with Bragg and Smith in Lexington, Kentucky on October 2. Bragg had been disappointed with the number of soldiers volunteering for Confederate service in Kentucky; wagon loads of weapons that had been shipped to the Commonwealth to arm the expected enlistees remained unissued. Desiring to enforce the Confederate Conscription Act to boost recruitment, Bragg decided to install the provisional government in the recently captured state capital of Frankfort. On October 4, 1862, Hawes was inaugurated as governor by the Confederate legislative council. In the celebratory atmosphere of the inauguration ceremony, however, the Confederate forces let their guard down, and were ambushed and forced to retreat by Buell's artillery.

== Decline and dissolution ==
Following the Battle of Perryville, the provisional government left Kentucky for the final time. Displaced from their home state, members of the legislative council dispersed to places where they could make a living or be supported by relatives until Governor Hawes called them into session. Scant records show that on December 30, 1862, Hawes summoned the council, auditor, and treasurer to his location at Athens, Tennessee for a meeting on January 15, 1863. Hawes himself unsuccessfully lobbied President Davis to remove Hawes' former superior, Humphrey Marshall, from command. On March 4, Hawes told Davis by letter that "our cause is steadily on the increase" and assured him that another foray into the Commonwealth would produce better results than the first had.

The government's financial woes also continued. Hawes was embarrassed to admit that neither he nor anyone else seemed to know what became of approximately $45,000 that had been sent from Columbus to Memphis, Tennessee during the Confederate occupation of Kentucky. Another major blow was Davis' 1864 decision not to allow Hawes to spend $1 million that had been secretly appropriated in August 1861 to help Kentucky maintain its neutrality. Davis reasoned that the money could not be spent for its intended purpose, since Kentucky had already been admitted to the Confederacy.

Late in the war, the provisional government existed mostly on paper. However, in the summer of 1864, Colonel R. A. Alston of the Ninth Tennessee Cavalry requested Governor Hawes' assistance in investigating crimes allegedly committed by Brigadier General John Hunt Morgan during his latest raid into Kentucky. Hawes never had to act on the request, however, as Morgan was suspended from command on August 10 and killed by Union troops on September 4, 1864.

There is no documentation detailing exactly when Kentucky's provisional government ceased operation. It is assumed to have dissolved upon the conclusion of the Civil War.

== See also ==
- Border states (Civil War) – Slave states that did not secede from the Union during the American Civil War
- Confederate government of Missouri – One of two rival state governments in Missouri
- Confederate government of West Virginia – Richmond's support in West Virginia
- Kentucky in the American Civil War
- Restored Government of Virginia – One of two rival state governments in Virginia
- Upland South – Geographic region in the Southern US
- Western Theater of the American Civil War – American Civil War area of operations

== Bibliography ==
- Kent Masterson Brown, ed. (2000). The Civil War in Kentucky: Battle for the Bluegrass. Mason City, Iowa: Savas Publishing Company. ISBN 1-882810-47-3.
- Encyclopedia Americana. Vol. 4 (1969 ed.). Americana Corporation. 1969. ISBN 0-7172-0100-7.
- Lowell H. Harrison, ed. (2004). Kentucky's Governors. Lexington, Kentucky: The University Press of Kentucky. ISBN 0-8131-2326-7.
- Harrison, Lowell H. (1975). The Civil War in Kentucky. Lexington, Kentucky: The University Press of Kentucky. ISBN 0-8131-0209-X.
- Harrison, Lowell Hayes (Winter 1981). "George W. Johnson and Richard Hawes: The Governors of Confederate Kentucky". The Register of the Kentucky Historical Society. 79 (1): 3–39.
- Heck, Frank H. (August 1955). "John C. Breckinridge in the Crisis of 1860–1861". The Journal of Southern History. 21 (3). Southern Historical Association: 316–346. doi:10.2307/2954954. JSTOR 2954954.
- Kleber, John E., ed. (1992). The Kentucky Encyclopedia. Associate editors: Thomas D. Clark, Lowell H. Harrison, and James C. Klotter. Lexington, Kentucky: The University Press of Kentucky. ISBN 0-8131-1772-0.
- Klotter, James C.; Harrison, Lowell; Ramage, James; Roland, Charles; Taylor, Richard; Bush, Bryan S; Fugate, Tom; Hibbs, Dixie; Matthews, Lisa; Moody, Robert C.; Myers, Marshall; Sanders, Stuart; McBride, Stephen (2005). Rose, Jerlene (ed.). Kentucky's Civil War 1861–1865. Clay City, Kentucky: Back Home In Kentucky, Inc. ISBN 0-9769231-1-4.
- Nevins, Allan (1971) [1959]. The War for the Union: The Improvised War 1861–1862. Konecky and Konecky. ISBN 978-1-56852-296-8.
- Noe, Kenneth W. (2001). Perryville: This Grand Havoc of Battle. Lexington, Kentucky: University Press of Kentucky. ISBN 978-0-8131-2209-0.
- Powell, Robert A. (1976). Kentucky Governors. Frankfort, Kentucky: Kentucky Images. OCLC 2690774.
- Shortridge, William Porter (March 1923). "Kentucky Neutrality in 1861". The Mississippi Valley Historical Review. 9 (4). Organization of American Historians: 283–301. doi:10.2307/1886256. JSTOR 1886256.

Preceded by Missouri	List of C.S. states by date of admission to the Confederacy; Admitted on December 10, 1861 (13th)	Last
