= Hawes (disambiguation) =

Hawes is a small market town in the Richmondshire district of North Yorkshire, England.

Hawes may also refer to:

== Places ==
- Hawes County, New South Wales, Australia
- Hawes Township, Michigan, USA
- Hawes Junction, the former name of Garsdale railway station in Cumbria, England
- Hawes railway station, former railway station that served the town of Hawes in North Yorkshire, England
- Ben Hawes Golf Course and Park, park located just outside Owensboro, Kentucky, USA

== Other uses ==
- Hawes (surname)
- Southworth & Hawes, a 19th-century photographic firm in Boston
- USS Hawes (FFG-53), an American ship
- Hawes Radio Tower was on the former Hawes Airfield at Hinkley, California, USA
- Hayes
- Hawnes
