= John Dawson (Virginia politician) =

American lawyer and politician (1762–1814)

Member of the U.S. House of Representatives from Virginia's 11th district
- In office March 4, 1813 – March 31, 1814
- Preceded by: John Roane
- Succeeded by: Philip P. Barbour

Member of the U.S. House of Representatives from Virginia's 10th district
- In office March 4, 1803 – March 3, 1813
- Preceded by: Edwin Gray
- Succeeded by: Aylett Hawes

Member of the U.S. House of Representatives from Virginia's 15th district
- In office March 4, 1797 – March 4, 1803
- Preceded by: James Madison, Jr.
- Succeeded by: John Randolph

Delegate from Virginia to the Congress of the Confederation
- In office 1788–1789

Member of the Virginia House of Delegates from the Culpeper district
- In office 1786–1789

Personal details
- Born: 1762 Virginia Colony, British America
- Died: March 31, 1814 (aged 51–52) Washington, D.C., U.S.
- Resting place: Congressional Cemetery
- Party: Democratic-Republican
- Education: Harvard College
- Profession: Lawyer, planter, military officer, politician

John Dawson (1762 – March 31, 1814) was a Virginian lawyer, soldier and politician who served in the War of 1812 and a term in the Continental Congress as well as seven terms in the U.S. House of Representatives from 1797 until his death in office in 1814.

== Early life and education ==
Born in the Colony of Virginia, Dawson graduated from Harvard University in 1782, studied law and was admitted to the bar.

== Career ==
Known for his stylish attire and red hair, "Beau" Dawson was a correspondent of James Madison. His stepfather, Judge Joseph Jones, raised James Monroe following the death of Monroe’s father.

=== Virginia offices ===
Dawson served in the Virginia House of Delegates from 1786 to 1789 and was also elected a delegate of the Continental Congress in 1788.

A delegate to the Virginia Convention in 1788, Dawson opposed ratification, aligning himself with Monroe, Patrick Henry and George Mason, although that convention as a whole ratified the United States Constitution. The following year Dawson was selected to Virginia's privy council and served in that executive branch capacity for several years.

=== Congress ===
In 1796, Dawson was elected to the United States House of Representatives as a Democratic-Republican and served from 1797 to his death in 1814.

In 1801 President John Adams selected Dawson to transmit dispatches to the Government of France, and Dawson thus averted war with the one-time ally. Dawson became chairman of the Committee on the District of Columbia from 1813 to 1814, as well as served as an aide to Generals Jacob Brown and future President Andrew Jackson during the War of 1812.

== Death ==
Dawson died in Washington, D.C., on March 31, 1814.

== See also ==
- List of members of the United States Congress who died in office (1790–1899)

U.S. House of Representatives
Preceded by James Madison, Jr.	Member of the U.S. House of Representatives from Virginia's 15th congressional district March 4, 1797 – March 4, 1803 (obsolete district)	Succeeded by John Randolph
Preceded by Edwin Gray	Member of the U.S. House of Representatives from Virginia's 10th congressional district March 4, 1803 – March 4, 1813	Succeeded by Aylett Hawes
Preceded by John Roane	Member of the U.S. House of Representatives from Virginia's 11th congressional district March 4, 1813 – March 31, 1814	Succeeded by Philip P. Barbour
