= Hemp in the United States =

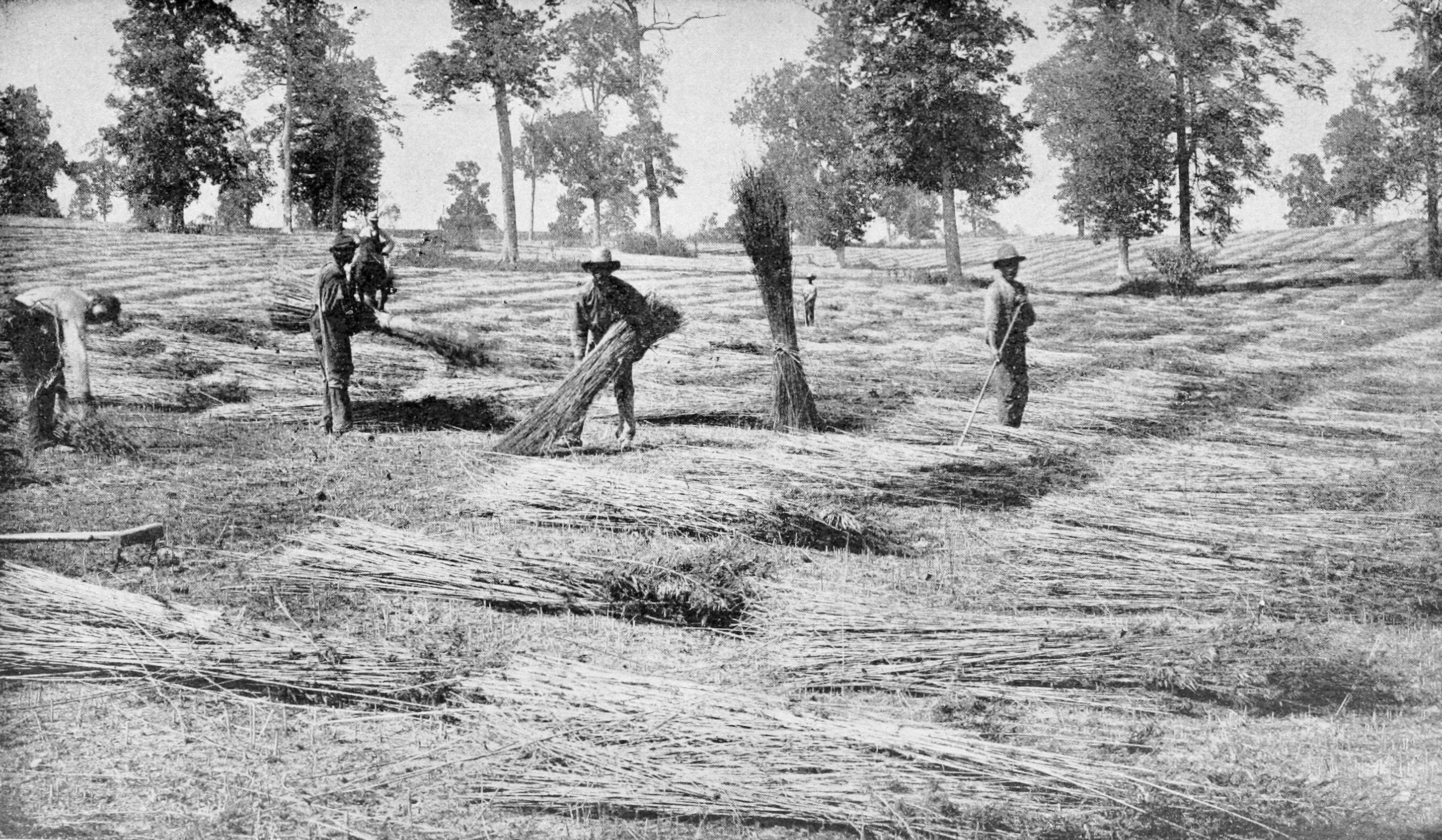
Spreading harvested hemp in Kentucky, 1898

Hemp is a legal crop in the United States. It was legal in the 18th and 19th centuries, then production was effectively banned in the mid-20th century, and it returned as a legal crop in the 21st century. By 2019, the United States had become the world's third largest producer of hemp, behind China and Canada.

== War on drugs ==
Federal policies, tightened by the Controlled Substances Act of 1970, virtually banned the production of industrial hemp during the war on drugs. According to an industry group, "the 1970 Act abolished the taxation approach [of the 1937 Marijuana Tax Act] and effectively made all cannabis cultivation illegal". The Drug Enforcement Administration (DEA) refused to issue permits for legal hemp cultivation (Note: A legal scholar wrote in 1999, "By law, industrial hemp is classified as a Schedule I controlled substance because of its distant relationship to the much higher tetrahydrocannabinol (THC)-containing plant, marijuana. Anyone wishing to grow, cultivate, or manufacture a Schedule I controlled substance must obtain licensing permission from the D.E.A. ... [I]ndustrial hemp cannot be legally grown in the United States because the D.E.A. refuses to grant farmers and entrepreneurs the required permit, Number 225, which would allow the licensee to "manufacture" a "controlled substance." The D.E.A. has never granted these permits.") and held that, since industrial hemp is from the same species plant as prohibited cannabis (despite its being of lower THC yield), both were prohibited under the Controlled Substances Act. In the words of a 2015 PBS NewsHour segment on hemp, "[t]o the federal government, hemp is just as illegal as marijuana", and according to Newsweek, "all cannabis sativa—whether grown to ease chronic pain, get stoned or make rope—is a schedule I controlled substance".

== 21st century legalization ==
The 2018 Farm Bill directed USDA to establish a national regulatory framework for hemp production in the United States.

The 2018 Farm Bill changed federal policy regarding hemp, including the removal of hemp from the Controlled Substances Act and the consideration of hemp as an agricultural product. The bill legalized hemp under certain restrictions and defined hemp as the plant species Cannabis sativa L. with a delta-9 tetrahydrocannabinol (THC) concentration of not more than 0.3 percent on a dry weight basis. Previously, the 2014 Farm Bill provided a definition for hemp and allowed for state departments of agriculture or universities to grow and produce hemp as part of research or pilot programs.

The U.S. Department of Agriculture (USDA) oversees hemp cultivation as the responsible federal regulatory agency. In October 2019, the USDA issued an interim final rule outlining a federal program for growing hemp. The USDA was set to issue a final rule after the 2020 crop season. The rule reemphasizes an earlier USDA ruling that interstate transportation is legal, even if the shipment travels through a state that does not allow the growing of hemp.

USDA published a final rule on January 19, 2021, that provides regulations for the production of hemp in the United States and is effective on March 22, 2021. The final rule builds on the interim final rule published October 31, 2019, that established the U.S. Domestic Hemp Production Program. The final rule incorporates modifications based on public comments and lessons learned during the 2020 growing season.

Key provisions of the final rule include:

- Negligent violation – producers must dispose of plants that exceed the acceptable hemp THC level. However, if the plant tests at or below the negligent threshold stated in the rule, producer will not have committed a negligent violation. The final rule raises the negligence threshold from .5 percent to 1 percent and limits the maximum number of negligent violations that a producer can receive in a growing season (calendar year) to one.
- Disposal and remediation of non-compliant plants – the final rule allows for alternative disposal methods for non-compliant plants that do not require using a DEA reverse distributor or law enforcement and expands the disposal and remediation measures available to producers. AMS will provide acceptable remediation techniques in a separate guidance document.
- Testing using DEA-registered laboratories – there are insufficient DEA-registered laboratories to test all the anticipated hemp that will be produced in 2020 and possibly 2021. DEA has agreed to extend the enforcement flexibility allowing non-DEA registered labs to test hemp until January 1, 2022, and is processing lab registration applications quickly to get more labs testing hemp DEA-registered.
- Timing of sample collection – the IFR stated a 15-day window to collect samples before harvest. The FR extends this requirement to 30 days before harvest.
- Sampling method – stakeholders requested that samples may be taken from a greater part of the plant or the entire plant. They also requested sampling from a smaller number of plants. The FR allow states and tribes to adopt a performance-based approach to sampling in their plans. The plan must be submitted to USDA for approval. It may take into consideration state seed certification programs, history of producer compliance and other factors determined by the State or Tribe.
- Extent of tribal regulatory authority over the territory of the Indian Tribe – the IFR did not specifically address whether a tribe with an approved USDA plan could exercise primary regulatory authority over the production of hemp across all its territory or only lands over which it has inherent jurisdiction. The final rule provides that a tribe may exercise jurisdiction and therefore regulatory authority over the production of hemp throughout its territory regardless of the extent of its inherent regulatory authority.

USDA published a final rule on January 19, 2021, that provides regulations for the production of hemp in the United States and is effective on March 22, 2021. The final rule builds on the interim final rule published October 31, 2019, that established the U.S. Domestic Hemp Production Program. The final rule incorporates modifications based on public comments and lessons learned during the 2020 growing season.
