= Richard Hawes =

United States Representative; Second Confederate governor of Kentucky

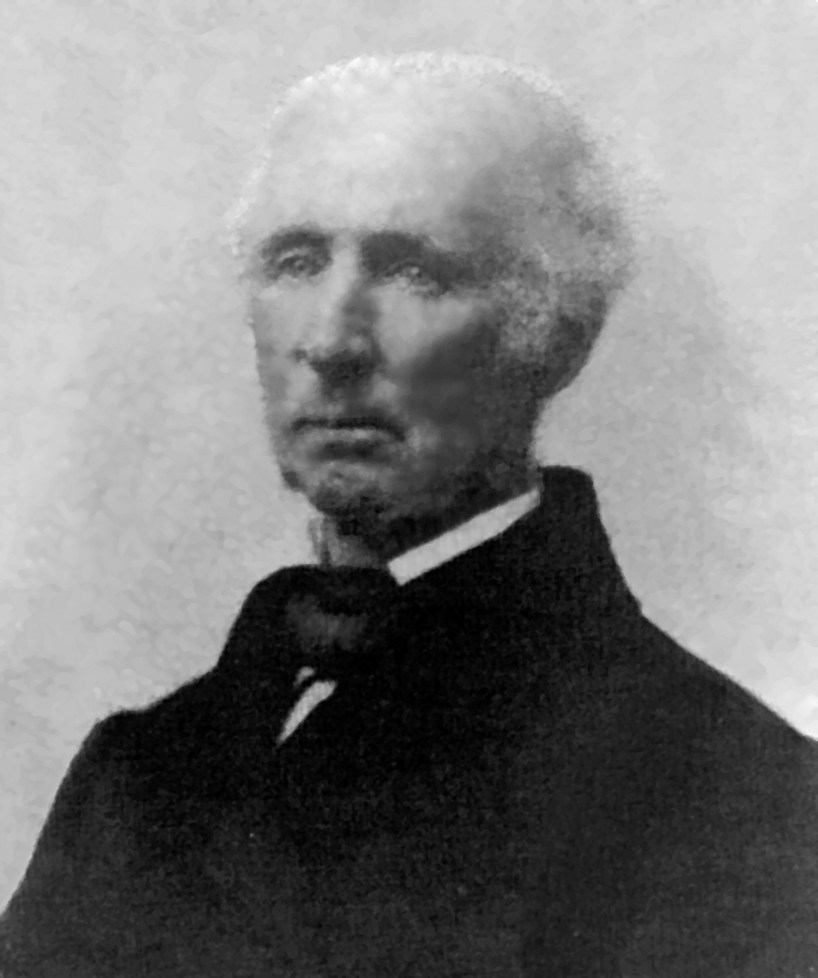

2nd Confederate Governor of Kentucky
- In office May 31, 1862 – April 9, 1865 Serving with Thomas E. Bramlette (as Union Governor)
- Preceded by: George W. Johnson
- Succeeded by: Abolished (Thomas E. Bramlette as Governor)

Member of the U.S. House of Representatives from Kentucky's 10th district
- In office March 4, 1837 – March 3, 1841
- Preceded by: Chilton Allan
- Succeeded by: Thomas Francis Marshall

Personal details
- Born: February 6, 1797 Caroline County, Virginia, U.S.
- Died: May 25, 1877 (aged 80) Paris, Kentucky, U.S.
- Party: Whig; Democratic
- Spouse: Hetty Morrison Nicholas
- Relations: Albert Gallatin Hawes (brother); Aylett Hawes (uncle); Aylett Hawes Buckner (cousin)
- Education: Transylvania University
- Profession: Politician; lawyer

Richard Hawes Jr. (February 6, 1797 – May 25, 1877) was a United States representative from Kentucky and the second Confederate governor of Kentucky. He was part of the politically influential Hawes family. His brother, uncle, and cousin also served as U.S. Representatives, and his grandson Harry B. Hawes was a member of the United States Senate. He was a slaveholder.

Hawes began his political career as an ardent Whig and was a close friend of the party's founder, Henry Clay. When the party declined and dissolved in the 1850s, Hawes became a Democrat, and his relationship with Clay cooled.

At the outbreak of the Civil War, Hawes was a supporter of Kentucky's doctrine of armed neutrality. When the Commonwealth's neutrality was breached in September 1861, Hawes fled to Virginia and enlisted as a brigade commissary under Confederate general Humphrey Marshall. When Kentucky's Confederate government was formed in Russellville, Hawes was offered the position of state auditor, but declined. Months later, he was selected to be Confederate governor of the Commonwealth following George W. Johnson's death at the Battle of Shiloh.

Hawes and the Confederate government traveled with Braxton Bragg's Army of Tennessee, and when Bragg invaded Kentucky in October 1862, he captured Frankfort and held an inauguration ceremony for Hawes. The ceremony was interrupted, however, by forces under Union general Don Carlos Buell, and the Confederates were driven from the Commonwealth following the Battle of Perryville. Hawes relocated to Virginia, where he conducted a Confederate government in exile for Kentucky and continued to lobby President Jefferson Davis to attempt another invasion of the state.

At the end of the war, the Confederate government of Kentucky in exile ceased to exist, and Hawes returned to his home in Paris, Kentucky. He swore an oath of allegiance to the Union, and was allowed to return to his law practice. He was elected county judge of Bourbon County, a post he held until his death in 1877.

== Early life ==
Richard Hawes was born on February 6, 1797, near Bowling Green, Caroline County, Virginia. He was one of eleven children born to Richard and Clara^{[a]} Walker Hawes. The Haweses were a political family; Richard's brother, Albert Gallatin Hawes, uncle, Aylett Hawes, and cousin, Aylett Hawes Buckner, all served in the U.S. House of Representatives. In 1810, the family moved to Kentucky, settling in Fayette County, near Lexington. Part of Hawes's early education was obtained through the Jessamine County school conducted by Samuel Wilson.

On November 13, 1818, Hawes married Hetty Morrison Nicholas of Lexington. He pursued classical studies at Transylvania University, then studied law under Robert C. Wickliffe. Hawes and Wickliffe became law partners upon the former's admission to the bar in 1818. Due to overcrowding of the bar in Lexington, Hawes moved to Winchester in 1824. While there, he became part owner of a rope and bagging factory with Benjamin H. Buckner.

=== Political career ===
Hawes began his political career in 1828 when he was elected as a Whig to represent Clark County, Kentucky, in the Kentucky House of Representatives. As a member of the state militia, Hawes saw limited service in the Black Hawk War in 1832, and returned to his position in the Kentucky House in 1834. He was an unsuccessful candidate for U.S. Representative in 1834, but was elected to represent Henry Clay's "Ashland District" three years later, serving from March 4, 1837, to March 3, 1841. He then moved to Paris, Kentucky in 1843 and continued the practice of law.

Hawes was once close friends with Clay, though the friendship between them cooled when Hawes supported Zachary Taylor instead of Clay for president in 1848. When the Whig Party dissolved in the 1850s, Hawes became a Democrat, supporting presidential candidates James Buchanan in 1856 and John C. Breckinridge in 1860.

Though alarmed by the election of Abraham Lincoln in the election of 1860, Hawes was an opponent of secession, supporting instead the idea of armed neutrality. In May 1861, Hawes, Breckinridge, and Kentucky governor Beriah Magoffin represented the pro-slavery viewpoint at a convention to decide Kentucky's course in the Civil War. He attended another such convention in September 1861. Neither convention produced a conclusive decision.

A July 1861 address to the people of Bourbon County, authored by Hawes and other like-minded Democrats, blamed Republicans for starting the Civil War, denounced the coercion of states to remain in the Union, and warned that the Lincoln administration would fight to end slavery. The address called for an end to the war, recognition of the Confederate States of America as a sovereign nation, and equitable distribution of the national debt and federal property.

=== Military service ===
When Kentucky's neutrality was breached in September 1861, Hawes fled to Virginia to escape imprisonment by Federal authorities. While there, he enlisted as a brigade commissary under Confederate general Humphrey Marshall and was given the rank of major. Though his ability to obtain supplies for Marshall's brigade was commendable given the difficult conditions, his age (64) and lack of military experience lessened his value to Marshall's unit, and his predilection for jumping the chain of command and communicating directly with Confederate Secretary of War Judah P. Benjamin put him at odds with Marshall personally.

In November 1861, the self-appointed members of the Confederate state sovereignty convention in Russellville, Kentucky appointed Hawes state auditor of the Commonwealth's Confederate government, but he declined in order to continue his military service. However, he wrote President Davis on January 25, 1862, to inform him that he was traveling to Bowling Green, Kentucky, at Confederate Governor George W. Johnson's request in order to assist Johnson in administering the state government. He resigned his military commission two days later, but his departure for Bowling Green was delayed when he was stricken with typhoid fever.

== Confederate Governor of Kentucky ==
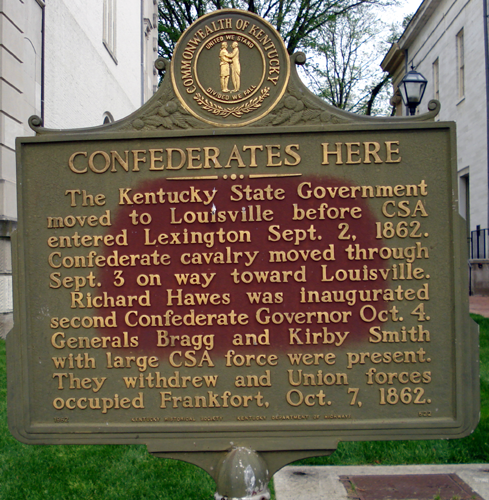
A historical marker in Frankfort, Kentucky, documents Hawes's inauguration as Confederate governor

Governor Johnson was killed while participating in the Battle of Shiloh. Following the resolutions of the Russellville Convention, the provisional Confederate government's ten legislative councillors selected Hawes to succeed Johnson as governor. (Under these provisions, the councillors could not select one of their own.) He joined the leaderless and nomadic shadow government, which had been traveling with the Army of Tennessee, in Corinth, Mississippi, and took the oath of office on May 31. The army's leader, General Braxton Bragg, had been considering an invasion of Kentucky. On August 27, Hawes was dispatched to Richmond, Virginia, to favorably recommend this action to President Jefferson Davis, but Davis was non-committal. Bragg and Edmund Kirby Smith proceeded with the invasion nonetheless, while the leaders of Kentucky's Confederate government remained in Chattanooga, Tennessee, awaiting Hawes's return. They departed on September 18, and caught up with Bragg and Smith in Lexington, Kentucky on October 2.

Bragg, desiring to enforce the Confederate Conscription Act in the Commonwealth, decided to install the provisional government in the recently captured state capital of Frankfort. The ceremony took place on October 4, 1862. Humphrey Marshall gave the opening remarks, then General Bragg introduced Governor Hawes. Hawes delivered a lengthy inaugural address in which he declared, "It is now a truth and a fact that the late Union cannot be restored." He promised to call a convention to provide for a permanent government as soon as such a convention was feasible, and denounced the Union's goal of freeing the slaves. In the celebratory atmosphere of the inauguration ceremony, however, the Confederate forces let their guard down, and were ambushed and forced to retreat by Union general Don Carlos Buell. Hawes later denied ever taking the oath of office, and became a vocal critic of Bragg.

Displaced from their home state, the legislative council dispersed to places where they could make a living or be supported by relatives until Governor Hawes called them into session. Scant records show that, on December 30, 1862, Hawes summoned the council, auditor, and treasurer to his location at Athens, Tennessee, for a meeting on January 15, 1863. Hawes unsuccessfully lobbied President Davis to remove Hawes's former superior, Humphrey Marshall, from command. On March 4, he told Davis by letter that "our cause is steadily on the increase" and assured him that another foray into the Commonwealth would produce better results than the first had.

The government's financial woes also continued. Hawes was embarrassed to admit that neither he nor anyone else seemed to know what became of approximately $45,000 that had been sent from Columbus to Memphis, Tennessee, during the Confederate occupation of Kentucky. Another major blow was Davis's decision not to allow Hawes to spend $1 million that had been secretly appropriated in August 1861 to help Kentucky maintain its neutrality. Davis reasoned that the money could not be spent for its intended purpose, since Kentucky was now a part of the Confederacy.

By 1864, Hawes had joined his sister at the small Virginia settlement of Nelly's Ford. His wife and daughter joined him there. This location was only 100 miles (160 km) from Richmond, allowing Hawes to travel easily to the Confederate capital for audiences with President Davis. Records show that as late as September 16, 1864, Hawes still maintained hope for another military advance into Kentucky. In the summer of 1864, Colonel R. A. Alston of the Ninth Tennessee Cavalry requested Governor Hawes's assistance in investigating crimes allegedly committed by General John Hunt Morgan during his unauthorized raid into Kentucky. Hawes never had to act on the request, however, as Morgan was suspended from command on August 10 and killed by Union troops on September 4, 1864.

== Later life and death ==
Hawes remained at Nelly's Ford until May 1865. Finally satisfied that it was safe to return to Kentucky, Hawes arrived in Paris to find his home had been burned by Union troops. Four of Hawes's sons served in the Confederate Army, including brigadier general James Morrison Hawes; only three sons returned home from the war.^{[b]} On September 18, 1865, Hawes took an oath of allegiance to the United States, and was allowed to return to his previous career as a lawyer.

In 1866, he was elected county judge of Bourbon County. His most notable ruling in this capacity was to nullify the apprenticeship contracts of the Freedmen's Bureau in Kentucky. Hawes based this decision on the fact that the Bureau's powers extended only to states that had been part of the rebellion, which Kentucky had not. Hawes was also chosen master commissioner of the circuit court in 1866. In 1871, Hawes was mentioned as a possible candidate for governor of Kentucky. In 1876, he helped frame his party's response to the disputed Hayes–Tilden presidential election. Hawes died in Paris, Kentucky, on May 25, 1877, and was interred in Paris Cemetery.

== See also ==
- Confederate government of Kentucky – Government of Kentucky in exile (1861–1865)
- History of Kentucky
- Kentucky in the American Civil War

== Notes ==
- ^[a]The Kentucky Encyclopedia lists the name as "Clary"
- ^[b]There is some discrepancy regarding the number of children born to Richard and Hetty Hawes. Harrison claims that the couple had two children, while Neace and Harned mention four sons. The 1850 census showed six Hawes children living in the household: four sons and two daughters. This did not include James Morrison Hawes, who was already an instructor at the United States Military Academy by 1850.
