= Aylett Hawes =

American politician (1768–1833)

Member of the Virginia House of Delegates from the Culpeper district
- In office December 1, 1802 – December 3, 1806 Serving with John Roberts (Culpeper)
- Preceded by: Moses Green
- Succeeded by: George F. Strother

Member of the U.S. House of Representatives from Virginia's 9th district
- In office March 4, 1811 – March 3, 1813
- Preceded by: John Love
- Succeeded by: John Hungerford

Member of the U.S. House of Representatives from Virginia's 10th district
- In office March 4, 1813 – March 3, 1817
- Preceded by: John Dawson (U.S. politician)
- Succeeded by: George F. Strother

Personal details
- Born: April 21, 1768 Culpeper County, Virginia Colony, British America
- Died: August 31, 1833 (aged 65) Rappahannock County, Virginia, U.S.
- Party: Democratic-Republican
- Education: University of Edinburgh, Scotland
- Profession: Doctor, planter, politician

Aylett Hawes (April 21, 1768 – August 31, 1833) was a nineteenth-century medical doctor, politician, planter and slaveholder from Virginia.

== Early life and education ==
Born in Culpeper County in the Colony of Virginia, Hawes received a private classical education. He then studied medicine and finished his education in Edinburgh, Scotland.

== Career ==
Upon returning to Virginia, Hawes practiced medicine as well as bought several plantations in Culpeper County and what became Rappahannock County, Virginia, which he farmed using enslaved labor. He owned 25 slaves in Culpeper County in 1810. A decade later, Hawes owned 49 slaves. In the last census before his death, he owned 70 slaves.

Culpeper County voters elected Hawes as one of their two representatives in the Virginia House of Delegates. He won re-election several times, serving from 1802 to 1806, all alongside John Roberts.

In 1810, voters in what was then Virginia's 9th congressional district elected Hawes, who ran as a Democratic-Republican to the United States House of Representatives. However, the 1810 census necessitated redistricting, so in his re-election campaign, Hawes ran in Virginia's 10th congressional district, whose incumbent John Dawson was moved into Virginia's 11th congressional district, much as Hawes was moved from the 9th. Hawes won re-election twice before resigning to resume his medical practice and plantations in Culpeper and Rappahannock Counties. He was succeeded by fellow Democratic Republican George F. Strother, who had succeeded him in the Virginia House of Delegates about a decade earlier.

== Death and legacy ==
Hawes died on his farm in Rappahannock County, Virginia, on August 31, 1833, and was interred on another plantation, in Sperryville, Virginia. He was the uncle of Richard Hawes, Albert Gallatin Hawes and Aylett Hawes Buckner.

U.S. House of Representatives
| Preceded by John Love | Member of the U.S. House of Representatives from Virginia's 9th congressional district March 4, 1811 – March 4, 1813 | Succeeded by John Hungerford |
| Preceded by John Dawson | Member of the U.S. House of Representatives from Virginia's 10th congressional district March 4, 1813 – March 4, 1817 | Succeeded by George Strother |
