= Albert Gallatin Hawes =

American politician

Albert Gallatin Hawes (April 1, 1804 – March 14, 1849) was a U.S. representative from Kentucky, brother of Richard Hawes, nephew of Aylett Hawes, granduncle of Harry Bartow Hawes, and cousin of Aylett Hawes Buckner.

Born near Bowling Green, Caroline County, Virginia, Hawes moved to Kentucky in 1810 with his parents, who settled in Fayette County near Lexington. He pursued classical studies at Transylvania University, Lexington, Kentucky. He moved to Hancock County and settled near Hawesville. He engaged in agricultural pursuits and was a slaveholder.

Hawes was elected as a Jacksonian to the Twenty-second, Twenty-third, and Twenty-fourth Congresses (March 4, 1831 – March 3, 1837). He served as chairman of the Committee on Expenditures in the Post Office Department (Twenty-second through Twenty-fourth Congresses).

After his term in Congress, Hawes resumed agricultural pursuits. He moved to Daviess County and settled near Yelvington, Kentucky and continued agricultural pursuits. He died near Yelvington, March 14, 1849. He was interred in the Hawes family burial ground on the Owensboro and Yelvington Road.

== Sources ==
- United States Congress. "Albert Gallatin Hawes (id: H000360)". Biographical Directory of the United States Congress.
- Allen, William B. (1872). A History of Kentucky: Embracing Gleanings, Reminiscences, Antiquities, Natural Curiosities, Statistics, and Biographical Sketches of Pioneers, Soldiers, Jurists, Lawyers, Statesmen, Divines, Mechanics, Farmers, Merchants, and Other Leading Men, of All Occupations and Pursuits. Bradley & Gilbert. pp. 282.

U.S. House of Representatives
Preceded by Thomas Chilton	Member of the U.S. House of Representatives from Kentucky's 11th congressional district 1831–1833 (obsolete district)	Succeeded by Amos Davis
Preceded by Thomas A. Marshall	Member of the U.S. House of Representatives from Kentucky's 2nd congressional district 1833–1837	Succeeded by Edward Rumsey
