= George W. Johnson (Kentucky politician) =

American politician (1811–1862)

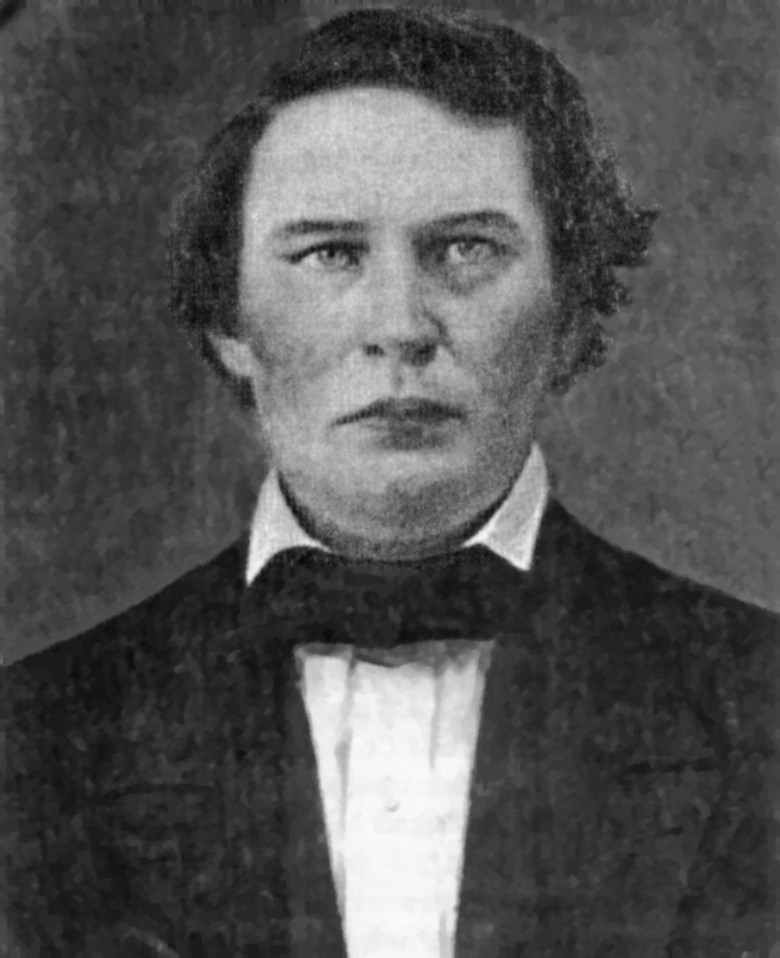

1st Confederate Governor of Kentucky
- In office November 20, 1861 – April 8, 1862
- Lieutenant: Horatio F. Simrall
- Preceded by: Office established
- Succeeded by: Richard Hawes

Member of the Kentucky House of Representatives from Scott County
- In office 1838–1840

Personal details
- Born: George Washington Johnson; May 27, 1811 Scott County, Kentucky, U.S.
- Died: April 8, 1862 (aged 50) Shiloh, Tennessee, C.S.
- Resting place: Georgetown Cemetery, Georgetown, Kentucky, U.S.
- Party: Democratic
- Spouse: Ann Eliza Viley (1833–1862)
- Children: 10
- Education: Transylvania University
- Committees: Committee of Sixty

Military service
- Allegiance: Confederate States
- Branch: Army
- Years of service: 1862
- Rank: Private
- Unit: 4th Kentucky Infantry Regiment
- Battles: American Civil War: Battle of Shiloh (DOW)

George Washington Johnson (May 27, 1811 – April 8, 1862) was the first Confederate governor of Kentucky. A lawyer-turned-farmer from Scott County, Kentucky, Johnson, a supporter of slavery who owned 26 slaves, favored secession as a means of preventing the Civil War, believing the Union and Confederacy would be forces of equal strength, each too wary to attack the other. As political sentiment in the Commonwealth took a decidedly Union turn following the elections of 1861, Johnson was instrumental in organizing a sovereignty convention in Russellville, Kentucky, with the intent of "severing forever our connection with the Federal Government." The convention created a Confederate shadow government for the Commonwealth, and Johnson was elected its governor. This government never controlled the entire state though it controlled about half the state early in the war, Kentucky remained in the Union after 1862 throughout the rest of the war.

Despite his meager political experience—having previously served only three years in the Kentucky House of Representatives—Johnson labored vehemently to ensure the success of the shadow government. Kentucky was admitted to the Confederacy on December 10, 1861, but the shadow government's influence in the Commonwealth extended only as far as the Confederate Army advanced. When Albert Sidney Johnston abandoned the Confederate capital of Bowling Green, Johnson and the other government officials accompanied him. Despite his advanced age and a crippled arm, Johnson volunteered for military service in General Johnston's army. Johnson was wounded at the Battle of Shiloh and died April 8, 1862. He was succeeded by Richard Hawes, the second and last governor of Confederate Kentucky.

== Early life and education ==
Johnson was born on May 27, 1811, near Georgetown in Scott County, Kentucky, the son of major William and Betsy Payne Johnson. Major Johnson died soon after the close of the War of 1812, in which he was a participant, and George Johnson was reared in the home of his stepfather, John Allen. Johnson received three degrees from Transylvania University: an A.B. in 1829, an LL.B. in 1832, and an M.A. in 1833. On August 20, 1833, he married Ann Eliza Viley, daughter of Captain Willa and Lydia Smith Viley. The couple had ten children, seven of whom lived to adulthood.

Johnson briefly practiced law in Georgetown, but decided he preferred farming. He owned a 300-acre (1.2 km^{2}) farm near Georgetown, as well as a 1,000-acre (4.0 km^{2}) plantation in Arkansas. In 1838, Johnson was elected as a Democrat to the Kentucky House of Representatives. He was offered the nominations for lieutenant governor and U.S. Congressman, but declined them both. In August 1845, Johnson headed the Committee of Sixty that seized abolitionist Cassius M. Clay's printing press and shipped it to Cincinnati, Ohio.

== American Civil War ==
Although he supported John C. Breckinridge for president in 1860, he did not feel that Abraham Lincoln's election justified secession, since Republicans controlled neither Congress nor the Supreme Court. As the Confederate States of America were formed, however, Johnson began to lose hope for Kentucky as a part of the Union. Instead, he began to advocate that Kentucky join the Confederacy, believing that the Union and Confederate nations would be too evenly matched to consider war and would negotiate a free trade agreement that would benefit both.

In 1861, Johnson traveled to Richmond, Virginia, to ask Jefferson Davis to respect Kentucky's neutrality in the Civil War. Following a near sweep of Kentucky's state and federal elections by Union sympathizers, William "Bull" Nelson established Camp Dick Robinson, a Union recruiting camp, in Garrard County. Southern sympathizers saw this as a breach of the Commonwealth's neutrality, and called a State Rights Convention on September 10, 1861. Johnson was among the delegates from seventy Kentucky counties who attended the convention. The delegates elected Richard Hawes as chair, called for a restoration of Kentucky's neutrality in the war, and condemned the Federal government for its "invasion." This last-minute effort to prevent Kentucky from aiding the Union was unsuccessful, and Johnson, a known Southern sympathizer, fled to Virginia with Breckinridge and others to avoid potential arrest by Union forces. From Virginia, Johnson traveled through Tennessee to Bowling Green where, despite his age (49) and a crippled arm, he volunteered as an aid to General Simon B. Buckner.

=== Russellville Convention ===
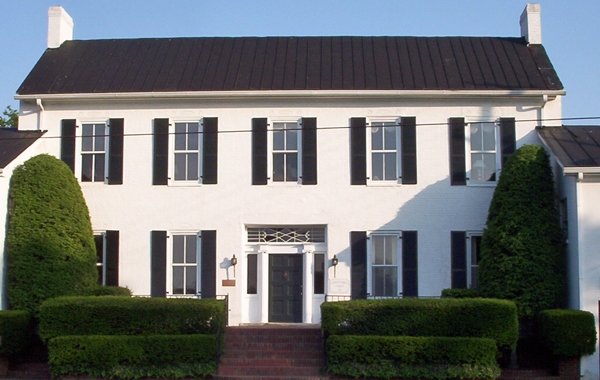
The Clark House in Russellville, Kentucky

On October 29, 1861, a group of Kentuckians—Johnson among them—met at Russellville, Kentucky, to discuss the formation of a Confederate government for the Commonwealth, believing the Unionist government in Frankfort did not represent the will of the majority of Kentucky's citizens. Johnson chaired the committee that authored the convention's final report, and personally introduced some of its key resolutions. The report called for a sovereignty convention to sever ties with the Federal government. Johnson, Breckinridge, and Humphrey Marshall were among the notable members of the Committee of Ten that made arrangements for the convention.

On November 18, 1861, 116 delegates representing 68 Kentucky counties convened at the Clark House in Russellville. Over the next three days, a shadow government was established with Bowling Green as its temporary capital. Johnson was unanimously chosen as governor of the new Confederate state.

=== Governor of Kentucky ===
On November 21, 1861, Johnson wrote Confederate president Jefferson Davis to request Kentucky's admission to the Confederacy. Though Davis had some reservation about the circumvention of the elected General Assembly in forming the Confederate government, he concluded that Johnson's request had merit. Kentucky was admitted to the Confederacy on December 10, 1861.

During the winter of 1861, Johnson tried unsuccessfully to assert the legitimacy of the fledgling government. Its jurisdiction extended only as far as the area controlled by the Confederate Army. Johnson came woefully short of raising the 46,000 troops requested by the Confederate Congress in Richmond. Efforts to levy taxes and to compel citizens to turn over their guns to the government were similarly unsuccessful. On January 3, 1862, Johnson requested a sum of $3 million from the Confederate Congress to meet the provisional government's operating expenses. The Congress instead approved a sum of $2 million, the expenditure of which required approval of Secretary of War Judah P. Benjamin and President Davis.

During his labors to sustain the provisional government, Johnson's lack of hearing from his family weighed heavily upon him. The only family member with whom he had contact was his son Madison ("Matty"), who had joined John Hunt Morgan's cavalry. Johnson admired and respected Morgan, and was pleased that his son had chosen to serve under him. In 1862, he requested by letter that his wife send their fifteen-year-old son Junius to serve in the Confederate Army. Despite Johnson's protestations that he would ensure his son's safety, his wife refused this request.

It was Johnson's practice to avoid interference with military decisions, however he supported Morgan's request for two light artillery pieces that became hallmarks of his command. By contrast, he consistently opposed the command of General Lloyd Tilghman, trying repeatedly but unsuccessfully to have him removed. It is unclear how much military influence Johnson wielded in his position as governor, though he enjoyed a cordial relationship with most of the Confederate generals.

=== Battle of Shiloh ===
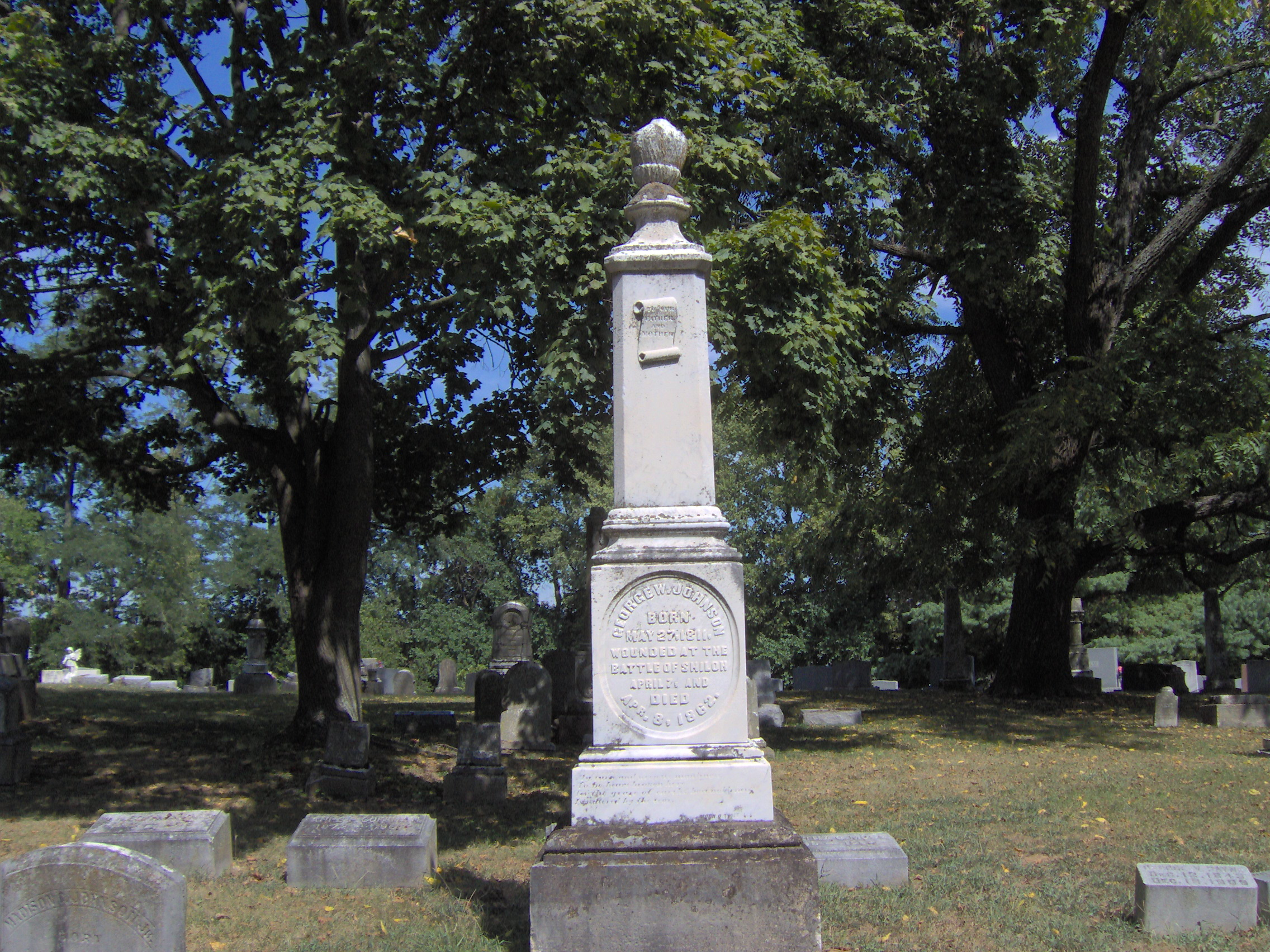
Johnson's gravestone in Georgetown Cemetery in Georgetown, Kentucky.

When General Albert Sidney Johnston was forced to withdraw his troops from Bowling Green in February 1862, the Confederate state government moved with his army to Tennessee. On April 6, 1862, General Johnston attacked the Union army at Shiloh, Tennessee. During this battle, Johnson served as a volunteer aide to General Breckinridge and Colonel Robert P. Trabue. After his horse was killed out from under him, Johnson fought on foot with Company E of the Fourth Kentucky Infantry Regiment, and insisted on being sworn in as a private. He declared "I will take a good night's rest and be ready for the fight tomorrow."

The next day, Johnson was seriously wounded in the right thigh and abdomen. He lay wounded on the battlefield until the next morning, when he was recognized by Union General Alexander McDowell McCook. Johnson and McCook had both attended the 1860 Democratic National Convention and were both Freemasons. Johnson was taken aboard the Union hospital ship Hannibal, where despite the ministrations of several physicians, he died on April 8. Friends in the Union army, including General John M. Harlan, packed Johnson's body in salt and shipped it to Louisville, then on to Georgetown for burial.

== See also ==
- Shropshire House – Historic house in Kentucky, United States

== Bibliography ==
- Kent Masterson Brown, ed. (2000). The Civil War in Kentucky: Battle for the Bluegrass. Mason City, Iowa: Savas Publishing Company. ISBN 1-882810-47-3.
- Harrison, Lowell Hayes (Winter 1981). "George W. Johnson and Richard Hawes: The Governors of Confederate Kentucky". The Register of the Kentucky Historical Society. 79 (1): 3–39.
- Lowell H. Harrison, ed. (2004). Kentucky's Governors. Lexington, Kentucky: The University Press of Kentucky. ISBN 0-8131-2326-7.
- Kleber, John E., ed. (1992). The Kentucky Encyclopedia. Associate editors: Thomas D. Clark, Lowell H. Harrison, and James C. Klotter. Lexington, Kentucky: The University Press of Kentucky. ISBN 0-8131-1772-0.
- Klotter, James C.; Harrison, Lowell; Ramage, James; Roland, Charles; Taylor, Richard; Bush, Bryan S.; Fugate, Tom; Hibbs, Dixie; Matthews, Lisa; Moody, Robert C.; Myers, Marshall; Sanders, Stuart; McBride, Stephen (2005). Rose, Jerlene (ed.). Kentucky's Civil War 1861–1865. Clay City, Kentucky: Back Home In Kentucky, Inc. ISBN 0-9769231-1-4.
- William Henry Perrin, ed. (1882). History of Bourbon, Scott, Harrison and Nicholas Counties, Kentucky. Chicago, Illinois: O. L. Baskin & Co. ISBN 0-8063-0510-X. Archived from the original on July 25, 2011.
- Powell, Robert A. (1976). Kentucky Governors. Danville, Kentucky: Bluegrass Printing Company. OCLC 2690774.
