= Aylett H. Buckner =

American politician (1816–1894)

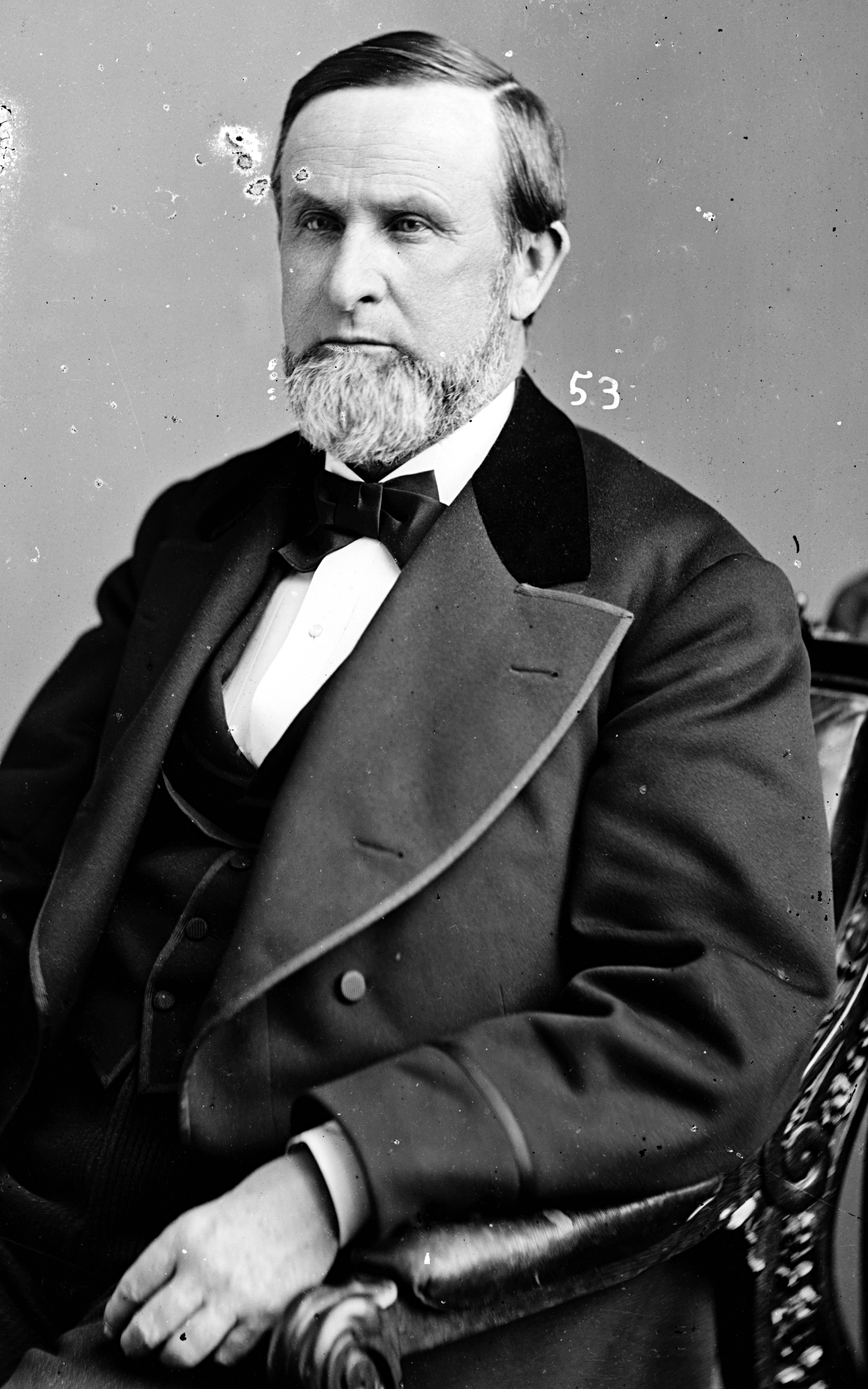

Member of the U.S. House of Representatives from Missouri
- In office March 4, 1873 – March 3, 1885
- Preceded by: District established (13th); Theron M. Rice (7th)
- Succeeded by: Robert W. Fyan (13th); John E. Hutton (7th)
- Constituency: 13th district (1873-83); 7th district (1883-85)

Personal details
- Born: Aylett Hawes Buckner; December 14, 1816 Fredericksburg, Virginia, U.S.
- Died: February 5, 1894 (aged 77) Mexico, Missouri, U.S.
- Resting place: Elmwood Cemetery
- Party: Democratic
- Relatives: Aylett Hawes (nephew); Richard Hawes (cousin); Albert Gallatin Hawes (cousin)
- Education: Georgetown College; University of Virginia
- Profession: Politician, lawyer

Aylett Hawes Buckner (December 14, 1816 – February 5, 1894) was a U.S. representative from Missouri, nephew of Aylett Hawes and cousin of Richard Hawes and Albert Gallatin Hawes.

Born in Fredericksburg, Virginia, Buckner attended Georgetown College, Washington, D.C., and the University of Virginia at Charlottesville. He engaged in teaching for several years. He moved to Palmyra, Missouri, in 1837. He served as deputy sheriff. He studied law. He was admitted to the bar in 1838 and commenced practice in Bowling Green, Missouri. He became editor of the Salt River Journal.

Buckner was elected clerk of the Pike County Court in 1841. He moved to St. Louis, Missouri, in 1850 and continued the practice of law. Attorney for the Bank of the State of Missouri in 1852. He was appointed commissioner of public works in 1854 and served until 1855. He returned to Pike County and settled on a farm near Bowling Green.

Buckner was elected judge of the third judicial circuit in 1857. He served as delegate to the convention held in Washington, D.C., in 1861 in an effort to devise means to prevent the impending war. He moved to St. Charles, Missouri, in 1862 and became interested in the manufacture of tobacco in St. Louis. He also engaged in mercantile pursuits. He moved to Mexico, Audrain County. He served as member of the Democratic central committee in 1868. He served as delegate to the Democratic National Convention in 1872.

Buckner was elected as a Democrat to the Forty-third and to the five succeeding Congresses (March 4, 1873 – March 3, 1885). He served as chairman of the Committee on District of Columbia (Forty-fourth Congress), Committee on Banking and Currency (Forty-fifth, Forty-sixth, and Forty-eighth Congresses). He had been a slaveholder. While many congressmen of that era held racist views, Buckner was a particularly strong advocate of the racial supremacy of whites. While enthusiastically advocating for restrictions on Chinese immigration, he also called for the removal of African Americans from the United States, asking "what reason can be assigned that we do not prepare to remove, not by forced expatriation or by any form of coercion, that portion of our population that, like the Chinese, are aliens to our race, whose blood does not mingle with that of the white race without corrupting it, and whose inferiority to the white race is an admitted fact?" While other congressmen were critical of granting rights to African Americans, even most southern members did not go so far as to advocate that millions of citizens be removed from the country.

He declined to be a candidate for reelection in 1884 and retired from public life. He died in Mexico, Missouri, February 5, 1894. He was interred in Elmwood Cemetery.

== Sources ==
- United States Congress. "Aylett H. Buckner (id: B001031)". Biographical Directory of the United States Congress.

U.S. House of Representatives
Preceded by District created	Member of the U.S. House of Representatives from Missouri's 13th congressional district 1873–1883	Succeeded by Robert W. Fyan
Preceded by Theron M. Rice	Member of the U.S. House of Representatives from Missouri's 7th congressional district 1883–1885	Succeeded by John E. Hutton
