= Kentucky Declaration of Neutrality =

Resolution passed by the Kentucky Legislature

Kentucky Declaration of Neutrality was a resolution passed by the Kentucky Legislature declaring the Commonwealth of Kentucky officially neutral in the American Civil War. It was enacted on May 16, 1861, following Governor Beriah Magoffin's refusal to send troops to aid the Union in invading the South the previous month. Magoffin had flatly refused President Abraham Lincoln's call for troops to fight seceded Southern states. The Legislature passed the resolution in an effort to prevent Kentucky from seceding and also to prevent Kentucky from becoming a battleground. Kentucky remained neutral until September 4, 1861, when Confederate Major General Leonidas Polk ordered Brigadier General Gideon Johnson Pillow to occupy Columbus. There were thirteen battles fought in Kentucky including Barbourville, Camp Wildcat, Ivy Mountain, Rowlett's Station, Middle Creek, Mill Springs, Richmond, Munfordville, Perryville, Somerset, Lebanon, Paducah, and Cynthiana. Although neutral, Kentucky was a key state during the Civil War. The battles that took place in Kentucky gave both the Union and the Confederacy distinct advantages and strongholds in the American Civil War.

== The Declaration ==
Kentucky House of Representatives - Committee on Federal Relations

Resolution of Neutrality, May 16, 1861

Considering the deplorable condition of the country and for which the State of Kentucky is in no way responsible, and looking to the best means of preserving the internal peace and securing the lives, liberty, and property of the citizens of the State; therefore,

Resolved, by the House of Representatives, that this State and the citizens thereof should take no part in the civil war now being waged, except as mediators and friends to the belligerent parties; and that Kentucky should, during the contest, occupy the position of strict neutrality.

Resolved, that the act of the governor in refusing to furnish troops or military force upon the call of the executive authority of the United States under existing circumstances is approved.

== Reasons for the Declaration ==
=== Governor Beriah Magoffin ===
As Governor of Kentucky in 1861, during the American Civil War, Beriah Magoffin had final say in Kentucky siding with either the Union or the Confederacy. In his position of power he was expected to put aside personal biases and make the decision best for Kentucky and its residents. Despite this however, Magoffin was a strong Confederate sympathizer, exemplified in his letter "What will Kentucky do, and what ought she do, now that Lincoln is elected president?" In the letter Governor Magoffin advocated to revise the fugitive slave law, stating free states should compensate slave owners should they refuse to surrender and return a slave to its owner. However, Magoffin was aware of the diverse social ideology regarding slavery among Kentucky's population. Unable to tell which side ruled the majority, Union sympathizers or Confederate sympathizers, Magoffin ruled it too much of a risk to Kentucky to pick a side in the war.

=== Geographic reasons ===
Kentucky's geographic location as a border southern state in the Upper South is cited as a large reason why the state decided to remain neutral during the American Civil War. Standing directly between the Union States and the Confederate States with Kentucky being in the Border South, Kentucky inhabitants were influenced greatly from both sides. Northern and Eastern Kentucky strongly sided with the Union, while Central/Southern and Western Kentucky agreed more with the Confederacy. Governor Beriah Magoffin knew that choosing a side in the war would upset a major portion state's population, regardless of with whom Kentucky sided. In effort to avoid rage-motivated riots and protests as well as mass emigration of Kentucky's population to other states, Magoffin decided remaining neutral was the best course of action.

=== Economic reasons ===
Kentucky's economy was like other states of the Upper South. While being a traditional southern plantation economy, it also depended greatly on trade from northern states. By the beginning of the American Civil War in 1861 an average of 1,000 shipments were delivered from Cincinnati each week. Siding with the Confederacy would quickly result in trade between Kentucky and northern states being cut off, severely effecting Kentucky's economic well-being. Trading with fellow southern states, however, was strongly opposed by Kentuckians as the South had a strict Anti-Tariff Policy. Despite this, slave labor still greatly benefited Kentucky's economy and ran the large scale tobacco plantations of the state. Despite Governor Beriah Magoffin working to take preventive action, Kentucky's economy still faced many damages after the American Civil War ended. Kentucky was forced to deal with the aftermath and pay for the damages of the thirteen battles that occurred within its borders during the American Civil War, putting the state under financial turmoil.

== Impact of the Declaration ==
The impact of this decision was seen throughout the remainder of the war. Kentucky's land was often occupied by camps and troops from both the Union and the Confederacy, with control constantly fluctuating between the two sides. Many of Kentucky's residents began to develop their own opinions about the decision of neutrality. Some were in favor of remaining neutral in the war, while others opposed it, pushing in favor of the Union as well as the Confederacy. Notably, many Confederate sympathizers strongly advocated for neutrality, fearing that if Kentucky did choose a side, it would choose the Union. President Abraham Lincoln called the state's position "conditional unionism", preferring that to Kentucky seceding.

Family homes were divided as a result of the decision, deriving the phrase "brother against brother". The state of Kentucky experienced a great deal of conflict within its own borders during the American Civil War. As the war raged on, Northern and Eastern Kentucky grew further from the ideology of slavery being a necessity in everyday life. Conversely, the residents from Western, Central, and Southern Kentucky strongly sided with the Confederacy as they relied heavily on slave labor for their plantation economy. In total, around 80,000-100,000 Kentuckians left to fight for Union Armies, including 20,000+ freed or escaped Kentucky slaves, while only 35,000-40,000 served as Confederate troops. This only furthered the divide amongst Kentucky residents, as soldiers from both sides began to return home toward the end of the Civil War. The effects of this divide can still be seen in Kentucky's current political climate, with two of the biggest cities—Louisville and Lexington—leaning strongly Democratic, while most other cities in the state leaning Republican.

== See also ==
- Kentucky in the Civil War
- History of Kentucky
