= 1926 United States Senate special election in Missouri =

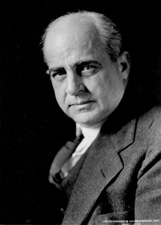

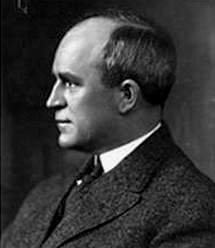
Nominee	Harry B. Hawes	George Howard Williams
Party	Democratic	Republican
Popular vote	514,389	473,068
Percentage	52.09%	47.91%
- County results Hawes: 50–60% 60–70% 70–80% 80–90% Williams: 50–60% 60–70% 70–80%
U.S. senator before election
George Howard Williams
Republican
Elected U.S. senator
Harry B. Hawes
Democratic

The 1926 United States Senate special election in Missouri took place on November 2, 1926 in Missouri. The Republican Senator elected in 1920, Selden P. Spencer, died on May 16, 1925. George Howard Williams was appointed to continue Spencer's term on May 25, and ran in this special election to complete the term. He was defeated by the Democratic nominee Harry B. Hawes, who won 52% of the vote. Hawes also defeated Williams in the regular election held the same day.

== Democratic primary ==
=== Candidates ===
- Harry B. Hawes, member of the House of Representatives for Missouri's 11th district
- Willis Meredith, attorney
- Robert I. Young, farmer

=== Results ===
Democratic primary August 3, 1926
Party	Candidate	Votes	%
Democratic	Harry B. Hawes	166,478	56.70
Democratic	Willis Meredith	94,388	32.15
Democratic	Robert I. Young	32,765	11.16
Total votes		293,622	100

== Republican primary ==
=== Candidates ===
- George Howard Williams, the incumbent Senator
- Blodgett Priest, attorney

=== Results ===
Republican primary August 3, 1926
Party	Candidate	Votes	%
Republican	George Howard Williams	213,176	75.72
Republican	Blodgett Priest	68,354	24.28
Total votes		281,530	100

== Results ==
1926 United States Senate special election in Missouri
Party	Candidate	Votes	%	±%
Democratic	Harry B. Hawes	514,389	52.09%	+7.62
Republican	George Howard Williams (Incumbent)	473,068	47.91%	−5.74
Majority		41,321	4.18%	
Turnout		987,457		
Democratic gain from Republican		Swing		
