= Harry B. Hawes =

American politician (1869–1947)

Harry Bartow Hawes
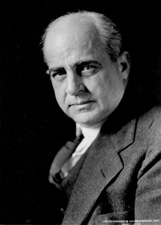

United States Senator from Missouri
- In office December 6, 1926 – February 3, 1933
- Preceded by: George H. Williams
- Succeeded by: Joel B. Clark

Member of the U.S. House of Representatives from Missouri's 11th district
- In office March 4, 1921 – October 15, 1926
- Preceded by: William L. Igoe
- Succeeded by: John J. Cochran

Member of the Missouri House of Representatives
- In office 1916–1917

Personal details
- Born: November 15, 1869 Covington, Kentucky, U.S.
- Died: July 31, 1947 (aged 77) Washington, D.C., U.S.
- Party: Democratic
- Education: Washington University in St. Louis

Harry Bartow Hawes (November 15, 1869 – July 31, 1947) was an American lawyer, conservationist, and politician who served as a Democratic member of the U.S. House and Senate from Missouri. Hawes is best known for the Hare–Hawes–Cutting Act, the first U.S. law granting independence to the Philippines, and for earlier work assisting the Republic of Hawaii become a U.S. territory.

== Early life ==
Harry B. Hawes was born in Covington, Kentucky, to Smith Nicholas and Susan Elizabeth (Simrall) Hawes. His grandfather was Richard Hawes, U.S. Congressman and second Confederate Governor of Kentucky. The Hawes family was active in politics dating back to America's earliest days. Besides Harry's grandfather, his grand-uncles Aylett Hawes and Albert Gallatin Hawes as well as cousin Aylett Hawes Buckner were well-known political figures of the 19th century. After receiving his basic education in Kentucky, Hawes moved to St. Louis, Missouri, in 1887. An old friend and Army comrade of his fathers soon found Hawes a position with the Third National Bank of St. Louis, where he worked while also pursuing higher education in his free time. He graduated from Washington University School of Law in 1896 and began a law practice under former Missouri Lieutenant Governor Charles P. Johnson, focusing mostly on corporate and international law. This led Hawes to become involved in the issue of American annexation of the Hawaiian Islands. He served as a delegate to the Trans-Mississippi Congress, a convention held in Salt Lake City, Utah, to discuss matters of statehood for existing U.S. territories and annexation of new lands. At the convention he became acquainted with Lorrin A. Thurston, one of the leaders of the overthrow of the Kingdom of Hawaii in 1893 and establishment of the Republic of Hawaii. A non-binding resolution in support of making Hawaii a U.S. territory was passed in no small part due to Hawes outspoken debate in favor. As a reward of sorts Thurston and the Republic of Hawaii offered Harry Hawes a diplomatic position and made him legal consul to guide their lobbying efforts, a position he held until Hawaii officially became a territory in 1898.

His Hawaiian goals achieved, Hawes returned to St. Louis, where on November 13, 1899, he married Eppes Osborne Robinson, whose own family's political pedigree traced back in Virginia to pre-Revolutionary War days. Hawes also formed a new law practice, Johnson, Houts, Marlatt, & Hawes, with three other young up and coming attorneys. The firm quickly became one of Missouri's most successful in that era. Around the same time, in 1898, Harry Hawes was appointed to the St. Louis Board of Police by an old friend, Missouri Governor Lon Vest Stephens. As chairman of the Police Board he received notoriety for his handling the St. Louis Streetcar Strike of 1900. Thousands of labor supporters rallied on behalf of the workers and considerable damage to property ensued over the spring and summer months, prompting a Federal judge to order Hawes and the Police Board to swear in a 2,500 man posse comitatus to help stop the unrest. In the period between May and September 1900, fourteen people were killed and two hundred wounded before the strike ended. Reappointed to the board again in 1901 by Governor Alexander M. Dockery, Hawes continued to serve in that position until 1904.

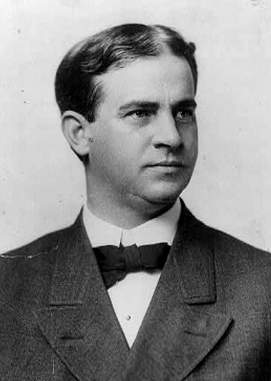
Hawes c. 1903

== Political and military service ==
Hawes entry into Missouri politics came in 1904, when he sought the Democratic nomination for governor. At the 1904 state Democratic convention Hawes was tapped as one of three candidates to possibly represent the party in the general election. Considering that the Democrats had held the governorship every term since 1873, it was likely that the convention winner would be the next Missouri Governor. However, it was not to be for Harry Hawes as he lost out to fellow Democrat and future Governor Joseph W. Folk by a wide margin.

Hawes' next foray into elective politics was more successful, as in 1916 was elected to the Missouri House of Representatives. While brief, his career in the House was eventful. Hawes authored bills that created the Missouri Highway Department and revised state traffic laws. He also served as chairman of the Good Roads committee and led the effort to pass a $60 million bond issue for creation of the states first highway system. Pertaining to river transportation and its importance to Missouri, Hawes was one of the chief organizers of the "Lakes to the Gulf Waterway Association", whose goal was creating a series of locks & dams along the Mississippi, Illinois and Missouri rivers that would enable easier shipment of grain and other goods.

Along with politics, military service was a long tradition in the Hawes family going back to the Revolutionary War. Harry's own father had been a Confederate Army Captain, badly wounded at the Battle of Shiloh. With America's entry into World War I in April, 1917 Hawes resigned from the Missouri House to serve in the military. Commissioned a Captain in the U.S. Army, Hawes served in the Psychological section of Military Intelligence. Working in France and Spain during the war, he was eventually assigned as military attaché to the U.S. Embassy in Madrid. Promoted to Major, Hawes was discharged in 1919.

Returning home to Missouri, Harry B. Hawes was elected to the Missouri's 11th congressional district, United States House of Representatives in the election of 1920, edging out Republican Bernard P. Bogy by a little over 2,000 votes. Alleged voting irregularities, including destroyed ballots, led Bogy to mount a legal challenge to the election outcome. Hawes counter claimed that Bogy was not a legal resident of the 11th Congressional district thus ineligible to serve. Several weeks of legal maneuvers followed before Hawes was again certified as the election victor. He would subsequently be reelected in 1922 and 1924, serving in the Sixty-seventh, Sixty-eighth, and Sixty-ninth Congresses. Hawes resigned before completing his third term in the House, stepping down on October 15, 1926. The following month he was elected to the Senate. Because Senator Selden P. Spencer had died in office, Hawes took his Senate seat three months early, on December 6, 1926, replacing interim appointee George H. Williams.

As Senator, Hawes worked for better flood control. This tied in with his earlier involvement with the Lakes to the Gulf Waterway Association when his "Missouri Plan" for levees along the Mississippi River was passed by Congress in 1929. An avid outdoorsman, he also supported efforts in wildlife conservation and was appointed to the Migratory Bird Conservation Commission in 1929. Senator Harry Hawes best-known achievement in Congress was the legislation that bears his name, the Hare–Hawes–Cutting Act. Created in conjunction with Representative Butler B. Hare of South Carolina and New Mexico Senator Bronson M. Cutting, the act aimed to grant the Philippine Islands full independence in graduated steps over a ten-year period. The legislation passed Congress in December 1932, but was vetoed by President Herbert Hoover. When Congress resumed work after the holiday break they overrode the veto on January 17, 1933. However one prerequisite of the act was ratification by the Philippine Senate, which failed to happen. The next year, 1934, a second effort very similar to the Hare-Hawes-Cutting act, the Tydings–McDuffie Act was finally agreed upon by the US and Philippine governments. By this time however Senator Hawes had become private citizen Harry Hawes. He did not seek reelection to the Senate in 1932, and resigned from his Senate seat on February 3, 1933.

== Later life ==
Hawes resumed his private practice, specializing mostly in international law, after leaving the U.S. Senate. In that capacity he served as legal counsel for the Philippine Commonwealth as they navigated a path to nationhood and the government in exile while the Philippines were occupied by the Japanese during World War II. Hawes was the author of two books; Philippine Uncertainty: An American Problem published in 1932, and Fish and Game: Now or Never in 1935. As his latter book title would suggest, Harry Hawes continued his wildlife activism after leaving Congress. Among his efforts was promoting the stocking of black bass in Missouri's streams and rivers. Harry B. Hawes died in Washington, D.C., on July 31, 1947. His cremated remains were returned to Missouri and the ashes scattered on the Current River near Doniphan, Missouri.

== Family ==
Hawes' parents and younger brother Richard Simrall Hawes moved to St. Louis not long after Harry did in 1887. His father was in failing health due to lingering wounds from his Civil War service, but worked for a time as manager of a wholesale lumber business before dying in 1889. Like his older brother before, a position with Third National Bank of St. Louis was secured for Richard S. Hawes and he would later become a prominent Missouri financier. Hawes married Elizabeth Eppes Osborne Robinson on November 13, 1899. They had two daughters, Eppes and Payton. Elizabeth Hawes had studied art early in life, and exhibited with the Society of Washington Artists prior to their marriage.

Party political offices
Preceded by Breckinridge Long	Democratic nominee for Senator from Missouri (Class 3); 1926	Succeeded by Bennett Champ Clark
U.S. House of Representatives
Preceded by William Leo Igoe	Member of the U.S. House of Representatives from Missouri's 11th congressional district 1921–1926	Succeeded by John J. Cochran
U.S. Senate
Preceded by George H. Williams	U.S. senator (Class 3) from Missouri; 1926–1933; Served alongside: James A. Reed, Roscoe C. Patterson	Succeeded by Bennett Champ Clark
