= 1926 United States Senate election in Missouri =

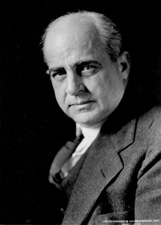

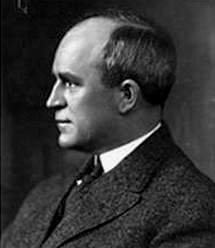
Nominee	Harry B. Hawes	George Howard Williams
Party	Democratic	Republican
Popular vote	506,015	470,654
Percentage	51.30%	47.71%
- County results Hawes: 40–50% 50–60% 60–70% 70–80% 80–90% Williams: 40–50% 50–60% 60–70% 70–80%
U.S. senator before election
George Howard Williams
Republican
Elected U.S. senator
Harry B. Hawes
Democratic

The 1926 United States Senate election in Missouri took place on November 2, 1926 in Missouri. The Republican Senator elected in 1920, Selden P. Spencer, died on May 16, 1925. George Howard Williams was appointed to continue Spencer's term on May 25, and ran for a full term in this election. He was defeated by the Democratic nominee Harry B. Hawes, who won 51% of the vote. Hawes also defeated Williams in the special election held the same day.

== Democratic primary ==
=== Candidates ===
- Ewing Cockrell, judge
- Harry B. Hawes, member of the House of Representatives for Missouri's 11th district
- Robert I. Young, farmer

=== Results ===
Democratic primary August 3, 1926
Party	Candidate	Votes	%
Democratic	Harry B. Hawes	162,921	54.48
Democratic	Ewing Cockrell	105,936	35.42
Democratic	Robert I. Young	30,195	10.10
Total votes		299,052	100

== Republican primary ==
=== Candidates ===
- George Howard Williams, the incumbent Senator
- Blodgett Priest, attorney
- David M. Proctor, State Senator for the 7th district

=== Results ===
Republican primary August 3, 1926
Party	Candidate	Votes	%
Republican	George Howard Williams (Incumbent)	147,436	52.30
Republican	David M. Proctor	87,074	30.89
Republican	Blodgett Priest	47,404	16.82
Total votes		281,914	100

== Other candidates ==
=== Prohibition ===
The Prohibition Party nominated Herman P. Faris.

=== Socialist ===
Socialist primary August 3, 1926
Party	Candidate	Votes	%
Socialist	Robert D. Morrison	72	100
Total votes		72	100

=== Socialist Labor ===
Socialist Labor primary August 3, 1926
Party	Candidate	Votes	%
Socialist Labor	William Wesley Cox	32	100
Total votes		32	100

== Results ==
1926 United States Senate election in Missouri
Party	Candidate	Votes	%	±%
Democratic	Harry B. Hawes	506,015	51.30%	+6.83
Republican	George Howard Williams (Incumbent)	470,654	47.71%	−5.94
Prohibition	Herman P. Faris	7,540	0.76%	+0.76
Socialist	Robert D. Morrison	1,807	0.18%	−1.33
Socialist Labor	William Wesley Cox	464	0.05%	−0.08
Majority		35,361	3.29%	
Turnout		986,480		
Democratic gain from Republican		Swing		
