= Xenophon P. Wilfley =

American politician (1871–1931)

Xenophon Pierce Wilfley
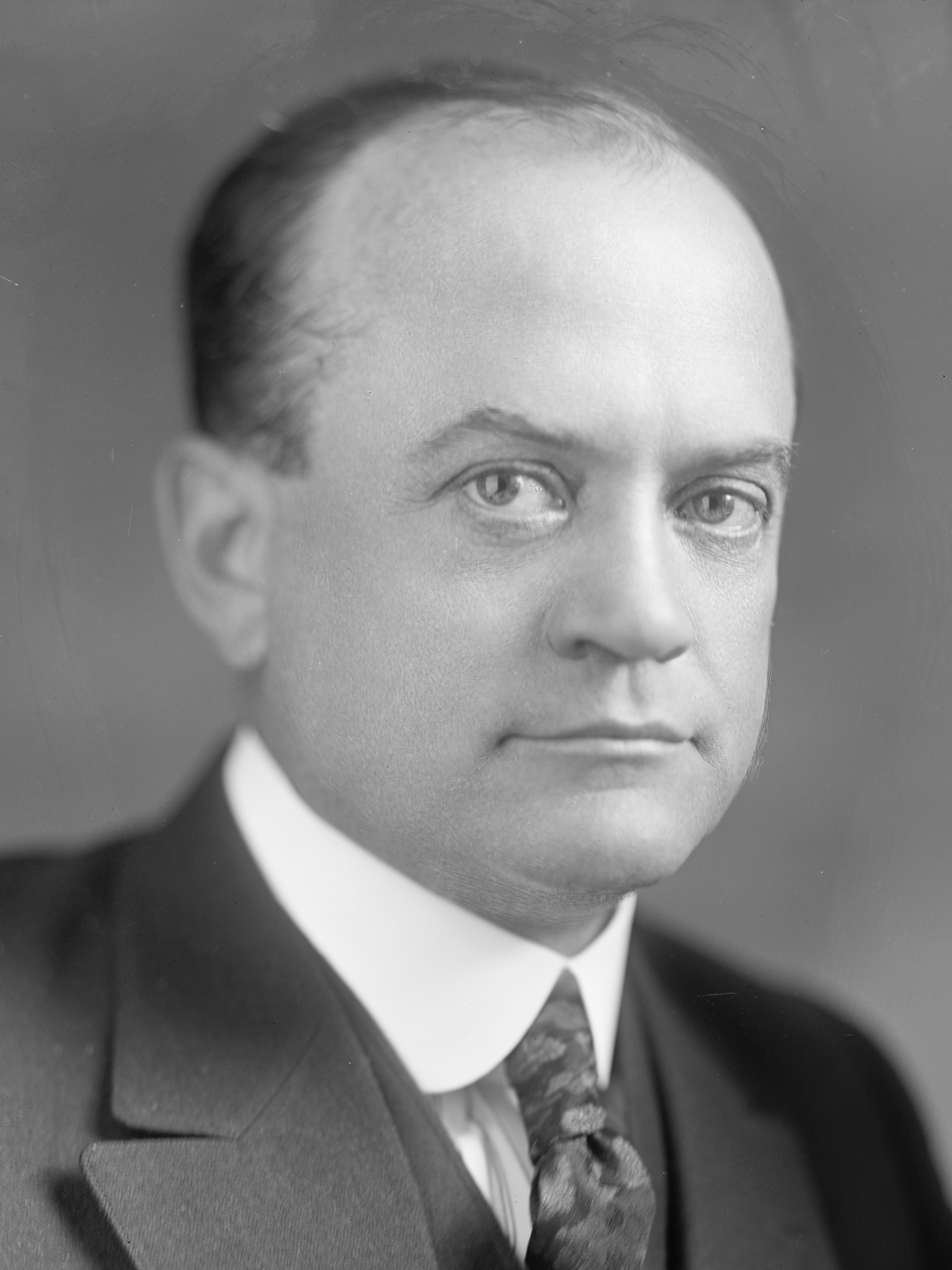
- Wilfley in 1905

United States Senator from Missouri
- In office April 30, 1918 – November 5, 1918
- Appointed by: Frederick D. Gardner
- Preceded by: William J. Stone
- Succeeded by: Selden P. Spencer

Personal details
- Born: March 18, 1871 Mexico, Missouri, U.S.
- Died: May 4, 1931 (aged 60) St. Louis, Missouri, U.S.
- Party: Democratic
- Relations: Lebbeus R. Wilfley (brother)
- Education: Washington University in St. Louis, Central Methodist University

Xenophon Pierce Wilfley (/ˈzɛnəfɒn ˈwɪlfli/; March 18, 1871 – May 4, 1931) was an American politician who represented the state of Missouri in the U.S. Senate for five months in 1918.

== Early life and education ==
Wilfley was born on March 18, 1871, near Mexico, Missouri, to James Franklin Wilfley. He attended local country schools in his youth. He graduated from Clarksburg College in 1891 and from Central Methodist College in Fayette, Missouri in 1894. He taught at Central Methodist College for one year and at Sedalia High School in Sedalia, Missouri for three years.

In 1899 he graduated from Washington University School of Law and began to practice law in St. Louis with his brother Lebbeus R. Wilfley. From 1917 to 1918 he was the chairman of the city's board of election commissioners.

== Political career ==
In 1918, Wilfley was appointed to the United States Senate by Governor Frederick D. Gardner as a Democrat to fill out the term of William J. Stone, who had died in office on April 14, 1918. Wilfley served from April 30 to November 5 and was the chairman of the Committee on Industrial Expositions. He unsuccessfully sought the Democratic nomination for the Senate seat but lost it to Joseph Folk, who in turn lost the general election to Republican Selden P. Spencer.

== Personal life and death ==
After leaving the Senate, Wilfley returned to St. Louis and resumed his legal practice, becoming president of the Missouri Bar Association in 1925. He was a Southern Methodist and a Freemason. He died in St. Louis in 1931 at the age of 60 and is buried in Oak Grove Cemetery.

Wilfley's brother, Lebbeus R. Wilfley, was Attorney General of the Philippines from 1901 to 1906 and Judge of the United States Court for China from 1906 to 1908.

In 1908, Wilfley married Rosamond Guthrie, who was also from Mexico, Missouri.

U.S. Senate
Preceded by William J. Stone	U.S. senator (Class 3) from Missouri; 1918; Served alongside: James A. Reed	Succeeded by Selden P. Spencer
