= Walter S. Dickey =

Newspaper publisher and politician (1862–1931)

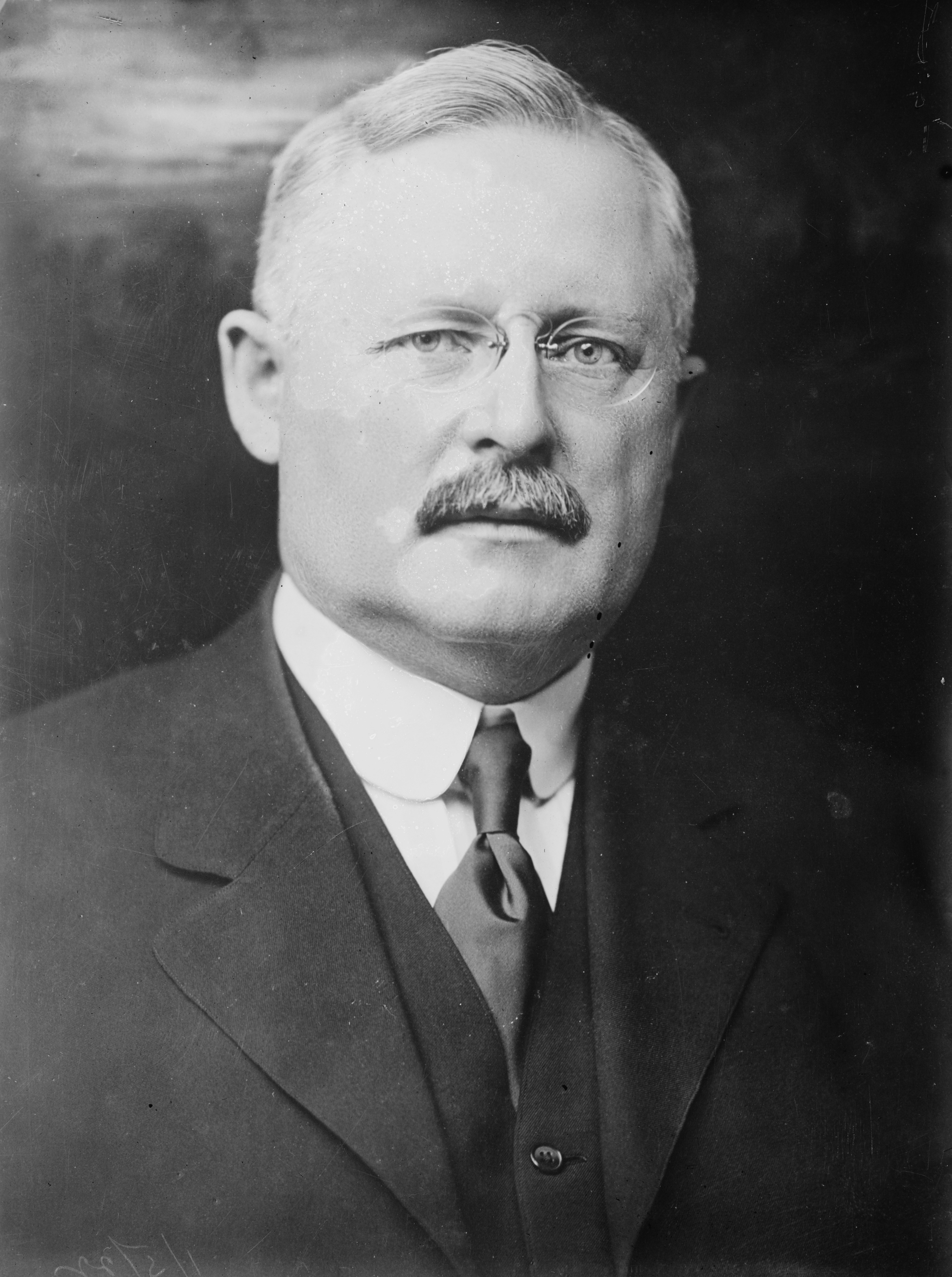
- Dickey c. 1915
- Born: Walter Simpson Dickey; June 26, 1862; Toronto, Canada West
- Died: January 22, 1931 (aged 68); Kansas City, Missouri, US
- Occupations: Newspaper Publisher; Politician; industrialist
- Political party: Republican

Walter Simpson Dickey (June 26, 1862 – January 22, 1931) was a Canadian-born newspaper publisher, politician, and industrialist in Kansas City, Missouri.

== Biography ==
Dickey was born in Toronto on June 26, 1862, the oldest of 11 children, and moved to Kansas City in 1885.

In 1889, he established the W.S. Dickey Clay Manufacturing Company which started out creating ceramic pipes made of "burnt clay" that were used to drain farmland via tile drainage. As municipalities developed underground sewage infrastructures, the company supplied clay pipes to serve that purpose. By 1915, the company was promoting its "tight as a jug" vitrified salt-glazed clay silos.

He was chairman of the Missouri Republican Party and helped engineer the victory of Herbert S. Hadley, the first Republican governor of Missouri since Reconstruction.

He owned the Kansas City Missouri River Navigation Company for river barges between Kansas City and St. Louis, Missouri until selling the entire fleet to the United States Army during World War I.

In 1916, he ran for United States Senate as a Republican, but was narrowly defeated by incumbent James A. Reed.

In the 1920s, he purchased the Kansas City Post and the Kansas City Journal, combining them into the Kansas City Journal-Post.

He died at his home in the Rockhill neighborhood of Kansas City, Missouri on January 22, 1931, aged 68. The next day, president Herbert Hoover gave a speech about his death.

Party political offices
First	Republican nominee for U.S. Senator from Missouri (Class 1); 1916	Succeeded by R. R. Brewster
