= 1922 United States Senate election in Missouri =

- November 7, 1922
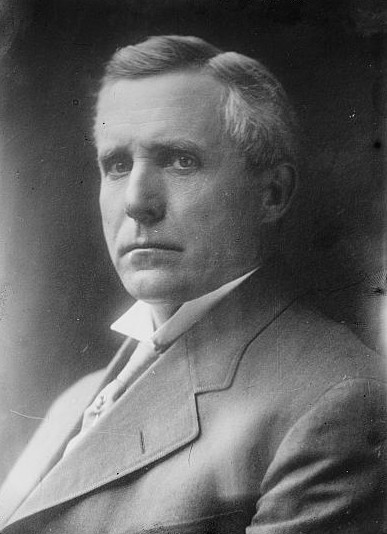

Nominee	James A. Reed	R.R. Brewster
Party	Democratic	Republican
Popular vote	506,264	462,009
Percentage	51.85%	47.32%
- County results Reed: 40–50% 50–60% 60–70% 70–80% Brewster: 40–50% 50–60% 60–70% 70–80%
U.S. senator before election
James A. Reed
Democratic
Elected U.S. Senator
James A. Reed
Democratic

The 1922 United States Senate election in Missouri was held on November 7, 1922. Incumbent Democratic U.S. Senator James A. Reed was re-elected to a third term over Republican R. R. Brewster.

== Democratic primary ==
=== Candidates ===
- Breckinridge Long, Third Assistant Secretary of State for Asian Affairs in the Woodrow Wilson administration and nominee for U.S. Senate in 1920
- James A. Reed, incumbent Senator since 1911
- Robert I. Young

=== Results ===
1922 Democratic U.S. Senate primary
Party	Candidate	Votes	%
Democratic	James A. Reed (incumbent)	195,955	49.49%
Democratic	Breckinridge Long	190,013	47.99%
Democratic	Robert I. Young	9,979	2.52%
Total votes		395,947	100.00%

== Republican primary ==
=== Candidates ===
- Jesse W. Barrett, Missouri Attorney General
- Sterling P. Bond, Democratic candidate for Senate in 1910
- R. R. Brewster
- John C. McKinley, former Lieutenant Governor of Missouri (1905–09)
- David M. Proctor, candidate for U.S. Senate in 1920
- John H. Parker
- William Sacks

=== Results ===
1922 Republican U.S. Senate primary
Party	Candidate	Votes	%
Republican	R. R. Brewster	89,528	33.44%
Republican	William Sacks	67,650	25.27%
Republican	Jesse W. Barrett	39,542	14.77%
Republican	John C. McKinley	32,124	12.00%
Republican	David M. Proctor	28,675	10.71%
Republican	John H. Parker	9,794	3.66%
Republican	Sterling P. Bond	422	0.16%
Total votes		267,735	100.00%

== General election ==
=== Results ===
1922 U.S. Senate election in Missouri
Party	Candidate	Votes	%	±%
Democratic	James A. Reed (incumbent)	506,264	51.85%	▲1.29
Republican	R. R. Brewster	462,009	47.32%	▼0.12
Socialist	William M. Brandt	7,119	0.73%	▼1.14
Socialist Labor	William Wesley Cox	970	0.10%	▼0.02
Total votes		976,362	100.00%	

== See also ==
- 1922 United States Senate elections
- List of United States senators from Missouri
