= Henry M. Beardsley =

American politician (1858–1938)

34th Mayor of Kansas City
- In office 1906–1907
- Preceded by: Jay H. Neff
- Succeeded by: Thomas T. Crittenden Jr.

Personal details
- Born: October 20, 1858 Mount Vernon, Ohio, US
- Died: April 19, 1938 (aged 79) Kansas City, Missouri, US
- Party: Republican
- Spouse: Marietta (Davis) Beardsley
- Children: Eleanor M.(b. 1884); George D.(b. 1887); Henry S.(b. 1895)
- Education: University of Illinois
- Occupation: Attorney; civic organizer; politician

Henry Mahan Beardsley (October 20, 1858 – April 19, 1938) was an attorney, civic leader, and the Mayor of Kansas City, Missouri from 1906 to 1907.

== Early life ==
Henry Beardsley was born on a farm near Mount Vernon, Ohio, one of six children of George Fitch and Martha (Mahan) Beardsley. In 1867 the Beardsley family moved to Champaign, Illinois, where Henry's father was a successful real estate broker and manufacturer. Henry attended the University of Illinois, where he earned degrees in Literature and Law in 1879 and 1880 with Phi Beta Kappa honors. After further study of law under Champaign attorney George W. Gere, Beardsley was admitted to the Illinois Bar in September 1882.

== Going to Kansas City ==
Henry Beardsley moved to Kansas City, Missouri, in October 1886 where he worked for Jarvis & Conklin Mortgage Trust Company briefly before establishing a law practice the following year with Alfred Gregory, an old friend from Illinois. Beardsley became involved with civic organizations soon after arriving in Kansas City including the local YMCA, which he became President of in 1892. He was a charter member of the Municipal Improvement Association, and elected President of the Kansas City Bar Association in 1895.

== Politics ==
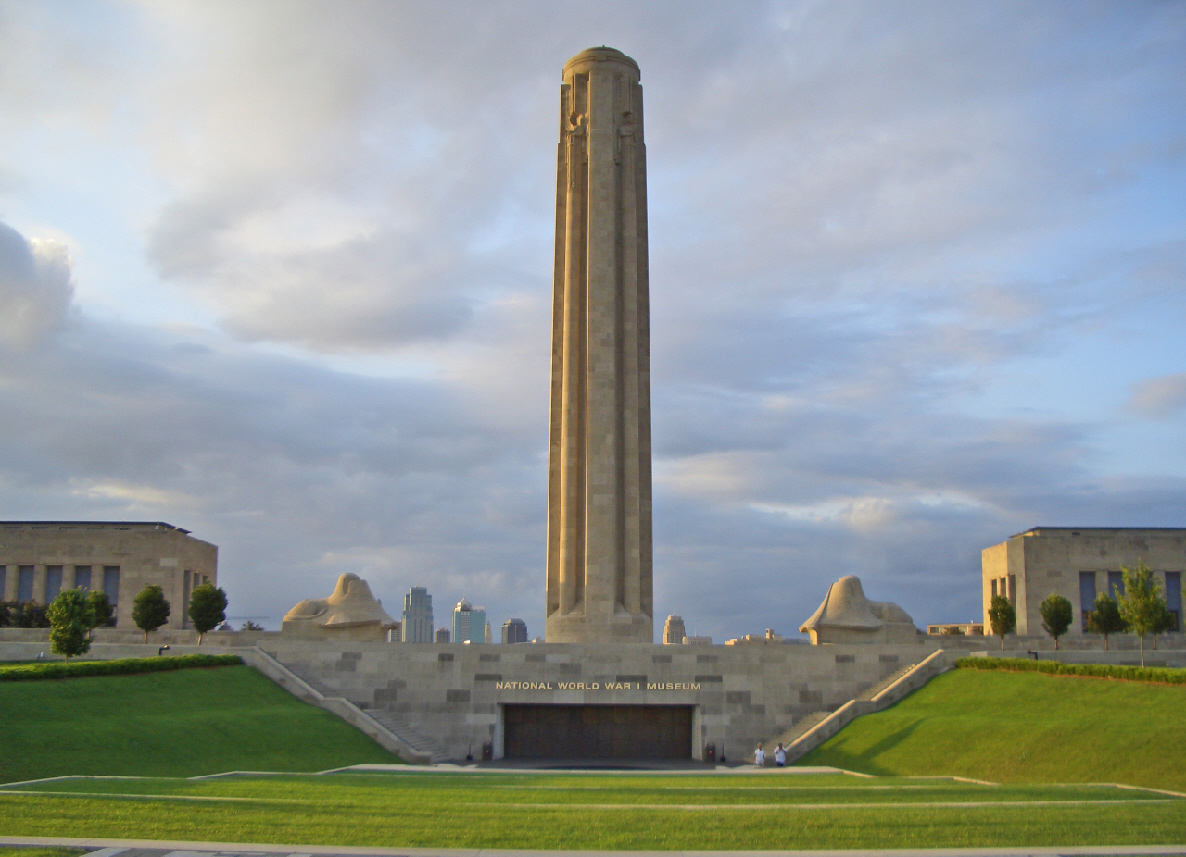
Henry Beardsley helped select the design of the Liberty Memorial.

In 1898 Henry Beardsley ran for and won the first of two terms on the Kansas City City Council. Reelected in 1902, he also served on the Board of Public Works where he lobbied for large improvements in the city's sewer and water systems. In 1900 Beardsley had become a charter member of the Kansas City chapter of the National Civic League as well. At first refusing calls from supporters to stand election for Mayor, in 1906 Beardsley gave in and won handily. As mayor he found some of his efforts stymied by the Pendergast political machine, however he was still able to bring a more businesslike approach to city hall. His biggest achievement perhaps is appointing a board to design a new city charter. The new charter was approved by voters in April 1908. However, in that same election Beardsley was denied a second term as mayor. Nonetheless he stayed involved as a civic leader in a variety of ways. Beardsley was a delegate to the Republican National Convention in 1908 and 1928. In 1910 he helped found the Kansas City chapter of the Society of the Friendless, a progressive organization promoting rehabilitation of prisoners while incarcerated. Speaking at an organizational meeting Beardsley said "Criminals ought to be on the credit instead of the debit side of the state's accounts. A small amount invested in reclaiming these men brings big returns to the state." Resuming his law practice after leaving the mayors office, Beardsley would often do pro bono work for those accused of crimes but could not afford an attorney. Perhaps the most visible legacy of Henry Beardsley in Kansas City is the Liberty Memorial. Beardsley chaired the committee that selected the designer of the memorial.

== Personal life ==
Henry M. Beardsley married his wife Marietta (Davis) in 1882. They were the parents of three children: Eleanor M. (born 1884), George D. (born 1887), and Henry S. (born 1895). In 1940 Henry S. Beardsley ran for 1st District United States Representative but was defeated. Henry Beardsley's grandson, Melville W. Beardsley, was an inventor and aeronautical engineer who contributed much to Hovercraft technology. On April 19, 1938, Henry Mahan Beardsley suffered a fatal heart attack in his Kansas City home.

Political offices
Preceded by Jay H. Neff	Mayor of Kansas City, Missouri; 1906–1907	Succeeded by Thomas T. Crittenden Jr.
