= James M. Jones =

American politician (1862–1928)

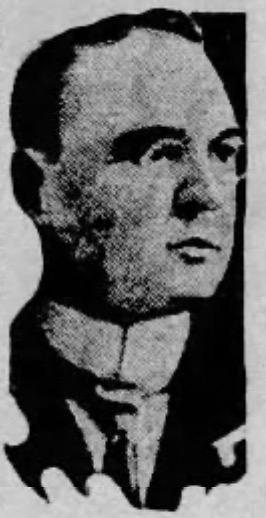

31st Mayor of Kansas City
- In office 1896–1900
- Preceded by: Webster Davis
- Succeeded by: James A. Reed

Personal details
- Born: James Monroe Jones; 1862 Prospect, New York, US
- Died: 1928 (aged 65–66)
- Party: Republican

James Monroe Jones (1862 – 1928) was an American politician. A Republican, he served as Mayor of Kansas City, Missouri from 1896 to 1900.

== Biography ==
Jones was born in Prospect, New York, and moved to Kansas City in 1885. He was a lawyer with offices at 15 West 9th Street and residence at 721 Harrison Street. Prior to being mayor, he was circuit court judge and had a residence at Independence and Park.

Political offices
Preceded by Webster Davis	Mayor of Kansas City, Missouri; 1896–1900	Succeeded by James A. Reed
