= 1918 United States Senate special election in Missouri =

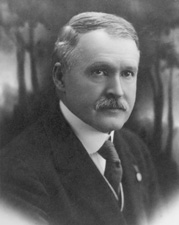

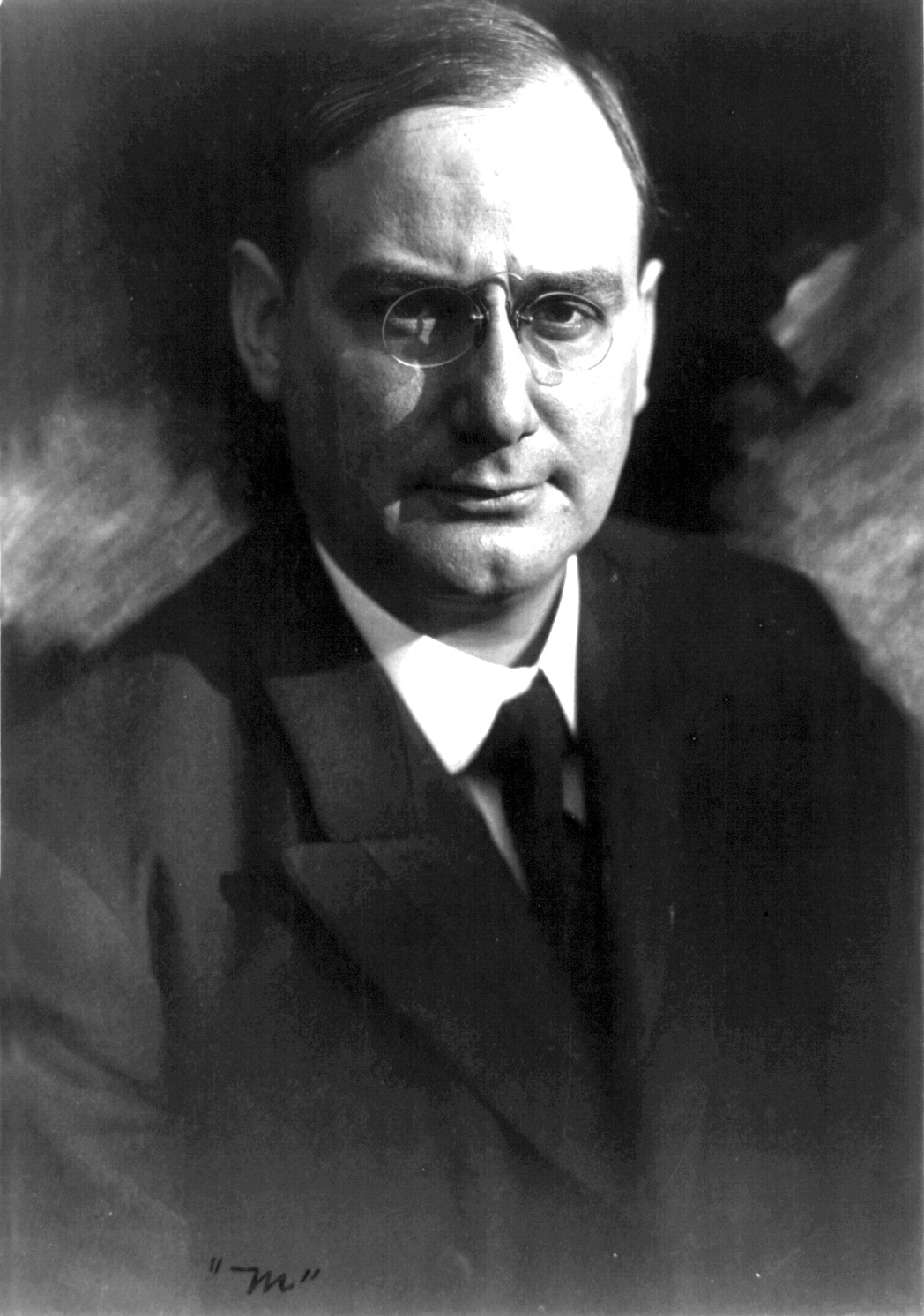
Nominee	Selden P. Spencer	Joseph W. Folk
Party	Republican	Democratic
Popular vote	302,680	267,397
Percentage	52.39%	46.29%
- County results Spencer: 40–50% 50–60% 60–70% 70–80% 80–90% Folk: 40–50% 50–60% 60–70% 70–80% 80–90%
U.S. senator before election
Xenophon P. Wilfley
Democratic
Elected U.S. senator
Selden P. Spencer
Republican

The 1918 United States Senate special election in Missouri took place on November 5, 1918, in Missouri. Democrat William J. Stone was elected to the full term in 1914, but died on April 14, 1918. Xenophon P. Wilfley was appointed to the vacant seat on April 30, 1918. He lost the Democratic primary election to Joseph W. Folk, who was defeated by Republican Selden P. Spencer in the general election.

== Democratic primary ==
=== Candidates ===
- Joseph W. Folk, former governor of Missouri
- Xenophon P. Wilfley, the incumbent Senator
- John C. Higdon, lawyer

=== Results ===
Democratic primary August 6, 1918
Party	Candidate	Votes	%
Democratic	Joseph W. Folk	107,690	55.06
Democratic	Xenophon P. Wilfley	80,009	40.90
Democratic	John C. Higdon	7,907	4.04
Total votes		195,606	100

== Republican primary ==
=== Candidates ===
- Selden P. Spencer, former circuit court judge and former state representative for the St. Louis City-5th district
- Jay L. Torrey, Rough Rider and former Speaker of the Wyoming House of Representatives

=== Results ===
Republican primary August 6, 1918
Party	Candidate	Votes	%
Republican	Selden P. Spencer	71,790	63.67
Republican	Jay L. Torrey	40,956	36.33
Total votes		112,746	100

== Other candidates ==
=== Socialist ===
Socialist primary August 6, 1918
Party	Candidate	Votes	%
Socialist	Caleb Lipscomb	1,414	100
Total votes		1,414	100

=== Socialist Labor ===
Socialist Labor primary August 6, 1918
Party	Candidate	Votes	%
Socialist Labor	William Wesley Cox	48	100
Total votes		48	100

== Results ==
1918 United States Senate election in Missouri
Party	Candidate	Votes	%	±%
Republican	Selden P. Spencer	302,680	52.39%	+10.81
Democratic	Joseph W. Folk	267,397	46.29%	−4.12
Socialist	Caleb Lipscomb	6,725	1.16%	−1.60
Socialist Labor	William Wesley Cox	904	0.16%	−0.04
Majority		35,283	6.10%	
Turnout		577,706		
Republican gain from Democratic		Swing		
