= 1916 United States Senate election in Missouri =

- November 7, 1916
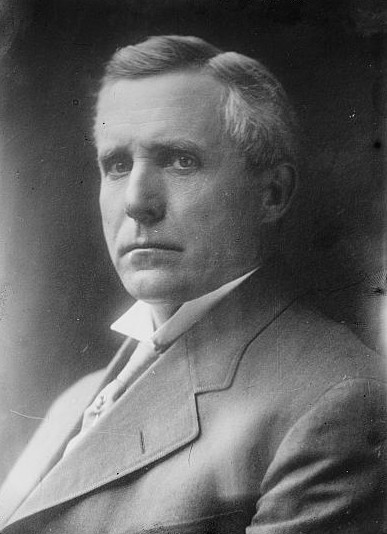

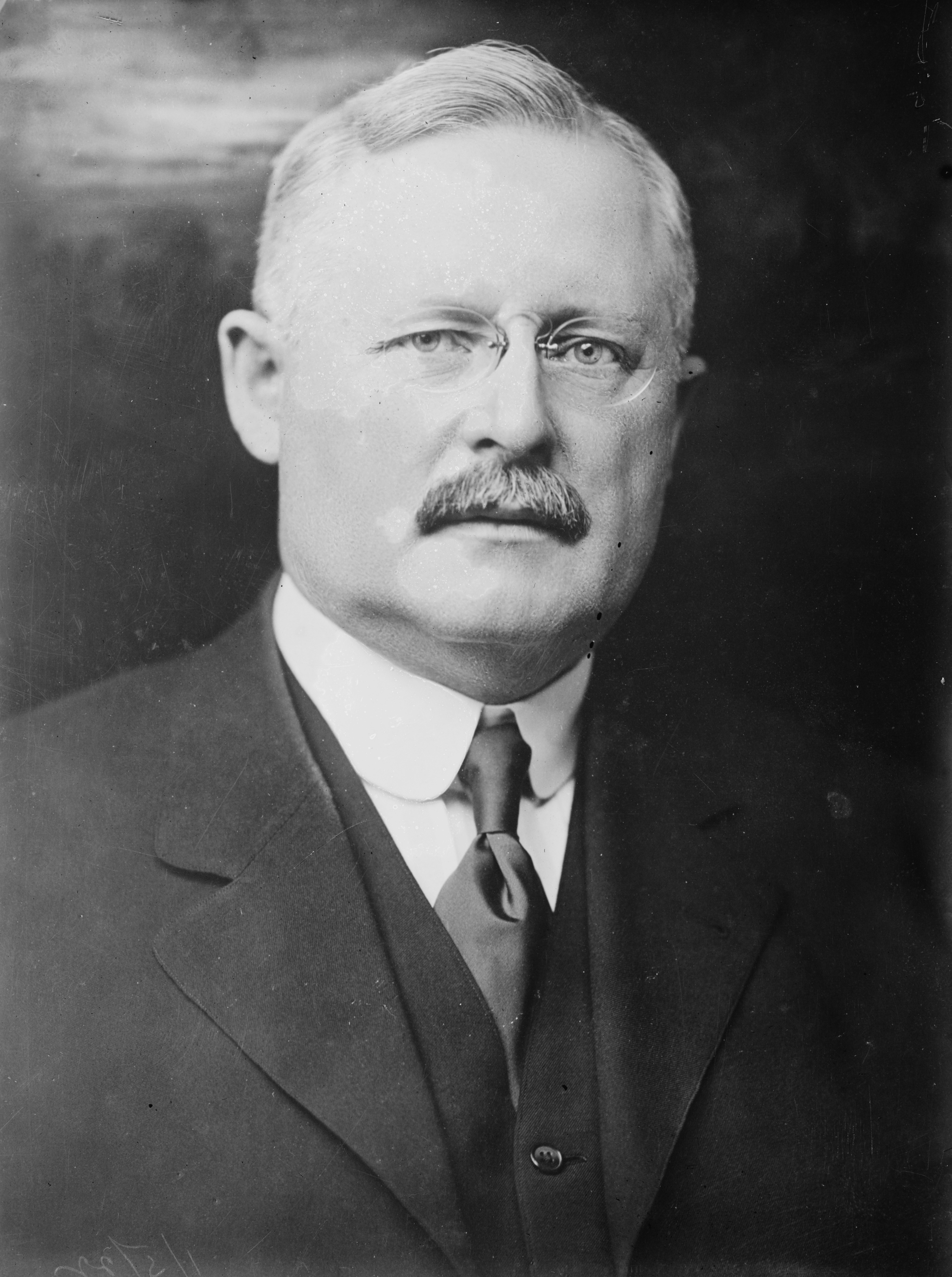
Nominee	James A. Reed	Walter S. Dickey
Party	Democratic	Republican
Popular vote	396,166	371,710
Percentage	50.56%	47.44%
- County results Reed: 40–50% 50–60% 60–70% 70–80% 80–90% Dickey: 40–50% 50–60% 60–70% 70–80% 80–90%
U.S. senator before election
James A. Reed
Democratic
Elected U.S. Senator
James A. Reed
Democratic

The 1916 United States Senate election in Missouri was held on November 7, 1916. Incumbent Democratic U.S. Senator James A. Reed was re-elected to a second term over Republican Walter S. Dickey.

== Democratic primary ==
=== Candidates ===
- Lawrence A. Martin
- James A. Reed, incumbent Senator since 1911

=== Results ===
1916 Democratic U.S. Senate primary
Party	Candidate	Votes	%
Democratic	James A. Reed (incumbent)	152,968	78.75%
Democratic	Lawrence A. Martin	41,287	21.25%
Total votes		194,255	100.00%

== Republican primary ==
=== Candidates ===
- Thomas J. Akins, nominee for U.S. Senate in 1914
- Walter S. Dickey, businessman and former chairman of the Missouri Republican Party
- Nathan Frank, former U.S. Representative from St. Louis

=== Results ===
1916 Republican U.S. Senate primary
Party	Candidate	Votes	%
Republican	Walter S. Dickey	97,130	51.30%
Republican	Thomas J. Akins	56,324	29.75%
Republican	Nathan Frank	35,901	18.96%
Total votes		189,355	100.00%

== General election ==
=== Results ===
1916 U.S. Senate election in Missouri
Party	Candidate	Votes	%
Democratic	James A. Reed (incumbent)	396,166	50.56%
Republican	Walter S. Dickey	371,710	47.44%
Socialist	Kate Richards O'Hare	14,654	1.87%
Socialist Labor	Joseph Scheidler	962	0.12%
Total votes		783,492	100.00%

== See also ==
- 1916 United States Senate elections
- List of United States senators from Missouri
