= Jay H. Neff =

American mayor (1854–1915)

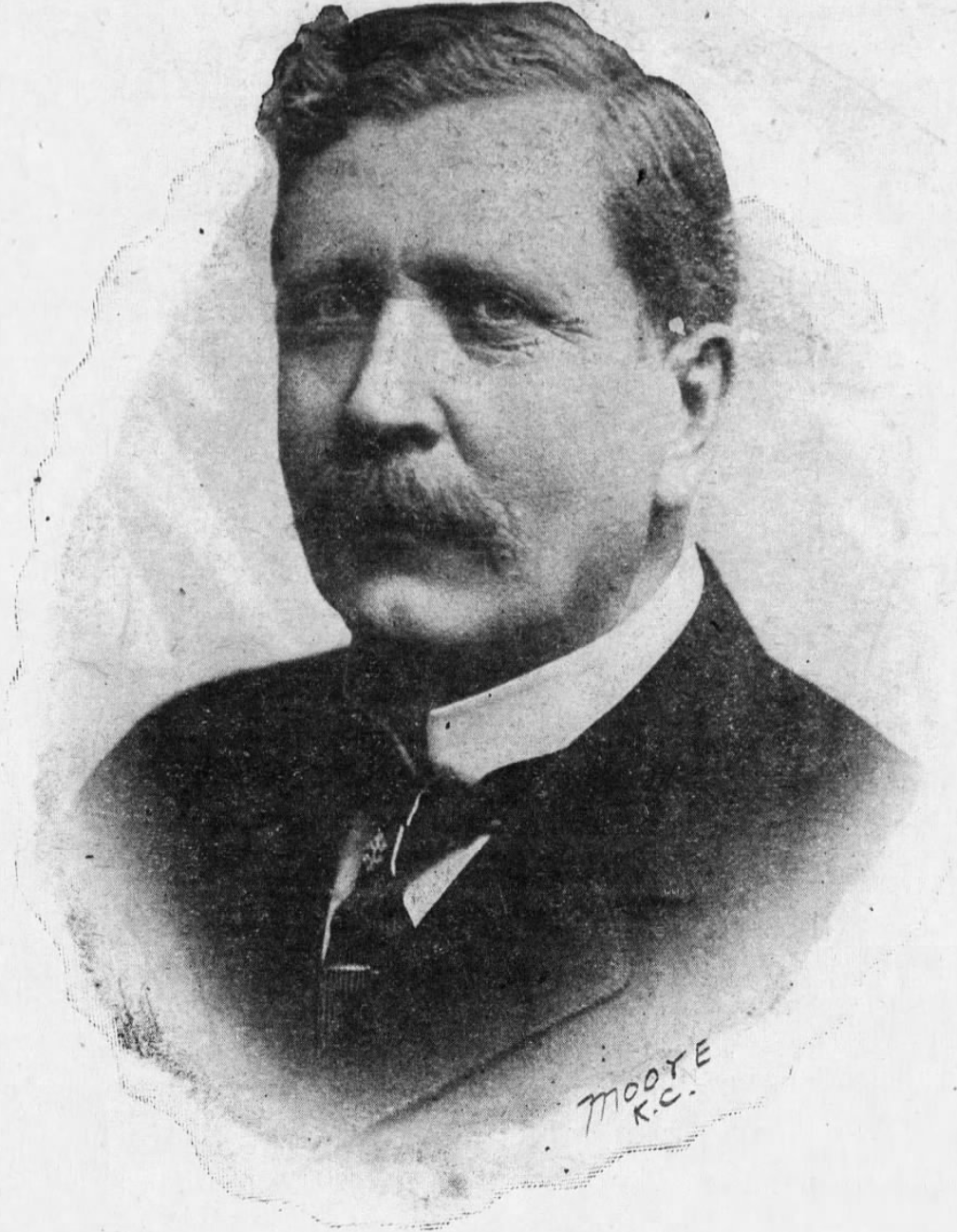

33rd Mayor of Kansas City
- In office 1904–1906
- Preceded by: James A. Reed
- Succeeded by: Henry M. Beardsley

Personal details
- Born: July 6, 1854; Hartford, Indiana, U.S.
- Died: August 14, 1915 (aged 61); Cody, Wyoming, U.S.
- Resting place: Forest Hill Calvary Cemetery; Kansas City, Missouri, U.S.
- Political party: Republican

Jay Holcomb Neff (July 6, 1854 – August 14, 1915) was a newspaper publisher and Mayor of Kansas City, Missouri from 1904 to 1906.

== Biography ==
Neff was born in Hartford, Indiana. He sold books to pay his way through Asbury College. He studied law and practiced in Peru, Indiana. He moved to Kansas City in 1881 where he started working the Kansas City Daily Price Current and eventually owned the publication which he renamed the Daily Drovers Telegram.

He bought similar publications in Omaha, Nebraska and St. Louis, Missouri.

In 1901 an editorial in the Kansas City Drovers Telegram entitled "Call It The American Royal" was to end up causing the Kansas City Livestock Show to change its name to the American Royal.

After his death his son Ward Andrew Neff bought the Chicago Daily Drovers Journal and all the publications were merged into the Kansas City Drovers. His son also donated money from the estate to move the University of Missouri School of Journalism from Switzler Hall to a new building which was named Neff Hall in honor of Jay Holcomb. At the time it was the biggest donation in University of Missouri history.

His residences were 1319 Washington Street, 520 Gladstone Boulevard and 1008 Valentine Road.

He died in Cody, Wyoming on August 14, 1915, and is buried in Forest Hill Calvary Cemetery in Kansas City.

Political offices
Preceded by James A. Reed	Mayor of Kansas City, Missouri; 1904–1906	Succeeded by Henry M. Beardsley
