= Breckinridge Long =

American diplomat (1881-1958)

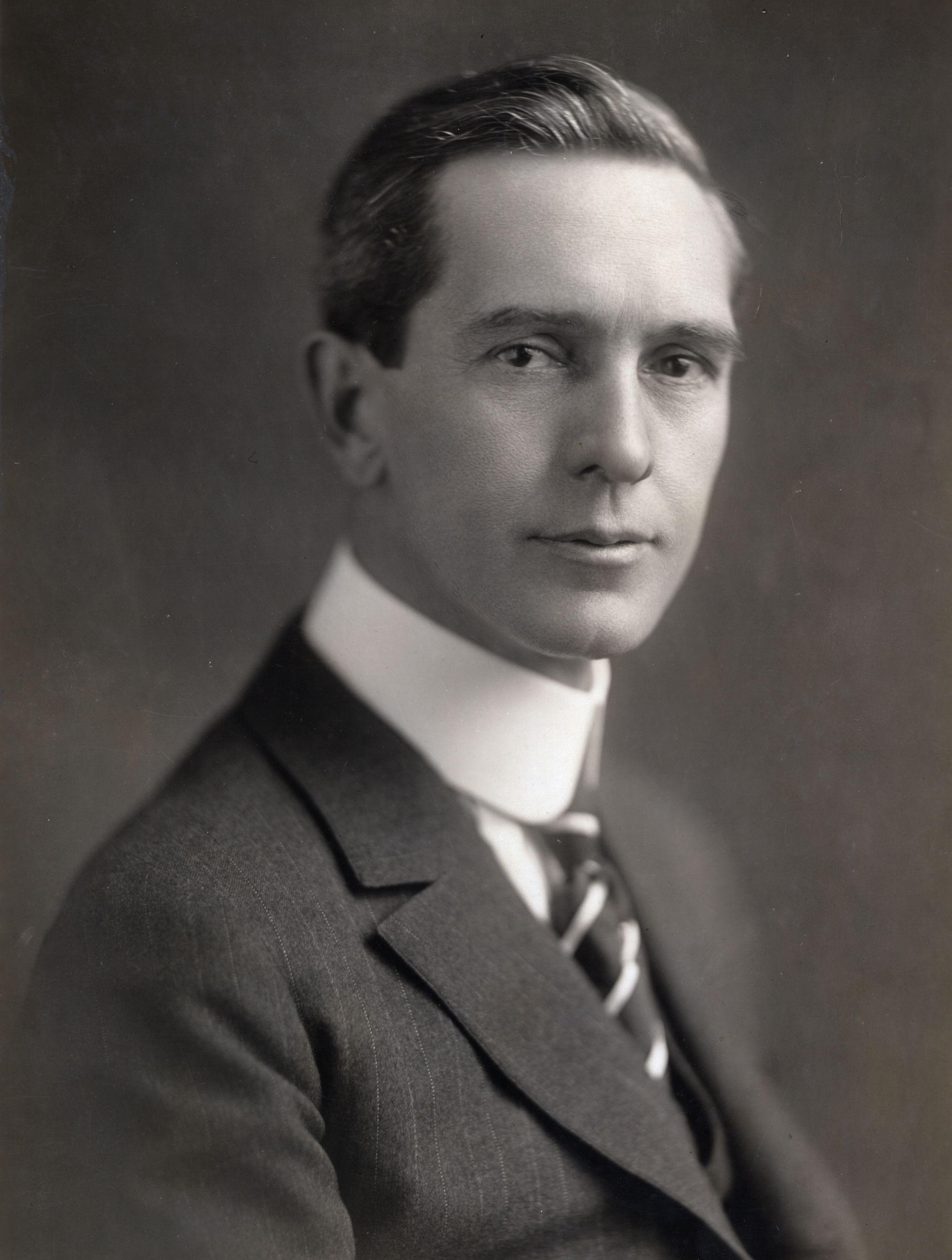
- Breckinridge Long

17th Third Assistant Secretary of State
- In office January 29, 1917 – June 8, 1920
- Preceded by: William Phillips
- Succeeded by: Van Santvoord Merle-Smith

United States Ambassador to Italy
- In office May 31, 1933 – April 23, 1936
- President: Franklin D. Roosevelt
- Preceded by: John W. Garrett
- Succeeded by: William Phillips

Personal details
- Born: Samuel Miller Breckinridge Long; May 16, 1881 St. Louis, Missouri, U.S.
- Died: September 26, 1958 (aged 77) Laurel, Maryland, U.S.
- Party: Democratic
- Spouse: Christine Alexander Graham
- Children: Christine Blair Long
- Parent(s): William Strudwick Long; Margaret Miller
- Education: Princeton University; Washington University in St. Louis
- Occupation: Lawyer, government official, racehorse owner
- Breckinridge Long's voice Breckinridge Long speaks about United States accomplishments during the Great War (recorded 1920)

Samuel Miller Breckinridge Long (May 16, 1881 – September 26, 1958) was an American diplomat and politician who served in the administrations of Woodrow Wilson and Franklin Delano Roosevelt. An extreme nativist, Long is largely remembered by Holocaust historians for obstructing the entry of European Jews into the United States during the 1930s and 1940s.

== Early life ==
Breckinridge Long was born on May 16, 1881, to Margaret Miller Breckinridge and William Strudwick Long in St. Louis, Missouri. Long was a member of the Breckinridge family, which has been described as "practically Confederate aristocracy". Long was a distant cousin of Henry Skillman Breckinridge (1886–1960), who was the United States Assistant Secretary of War from 1913-1916 under Wilson, and whose daughter married John Stephens Graham, the Assistant Secretary of the Treasury, and commissioner for the Internal Revenue Service and Atomic Energy Commission.

Long graduated from Princeton University in 1904, studied at Washington University School of Law from 1905 to 1906, and received his M.A. from Princeton University in 1909.

== Career ==
In 1906, Long was admitted to the bar in Missouri and opened an office in St. Louis in 1907. He continued to practice law independently until 1917. From 1914 to 1915, Long was a member of the Missouri Code Commission on Revision of Judicial Procedure. He then worked to establish the League of Nations and supported Wilsonian Democracy. He was credited with drafting Woodrow Wilson's "He kept us out of war" slogan, which helped secure Wilson's reelection as President in 1916.

Long joined the State Department shortly after the election. In 1917, he was appointed Third Assistant Secretary of State and remained at the post until he resigned in 1920 to pursue election to the U.S. Senate from Missouri. While in the Department of State, he held responsibility for overseeing Asian affairs. During this time, Long directed attention to the improvement of U.S. foreign communications policy, and coordinated the first interdepartmental review of U.S. international communications.

In 1920, Long was the Democratic nominee for the U.S. Senate seat in Missouri held by Selden P. Spencer, but was defeated, garnering 44.5% of the vote to Spencer's 53.7%. He lost a second bid for the Senate in 1922.

=== FDR administration, World War II, and antisemitism ===
Long was a personal friend of future President Franklin Delano Roosevelt, whom he had known as Assistant Secretary of the Navy during the Wilson Administration, and generously contributed to his 1932 Presidential campaign. Roosevelt rewarded him with the position of U.S. Ambassador to Italy, which he held from 1933 to 1936. During his ambassadorship, Long was criticized for advising the president against imposing an embargo on oil shipments to Italy in retaliation for Mussolini's invasion of Ethiopia. He "somewhat admired European fascism", according to diplomat and historian David McKean. In a letter to a friend, Long referred to Italian fascism as "the most interesting experiment in government to come above the horizon since the formulation of our Constitution." In 1938, he wrote in his diary,

"Have just finished Hitler's Mein Kampf. It is eloquent in opposition to Jewry and to Jews as exponents of Communism & chaos. ... My estimate of Hitler as a man rises with the reading of his book."

Long was a member of a special mission to Brazil, Argentina, and Uruguay in 1938. Upon the outbreak of war in September 1939, he accepted appointment as a Special Assistant Secretary of State in charge of problems arising from the war, a position he held until January 1940, when he was appointed Assistant Secretary of State. Until February 1941, Long was responsible for overseeing 23 of the 42 divisions in the department, before a revision of the workload among the other assistant secretaries.

In an intra-department memo he circulated in June 1940, Long wrote: "We can delay and effectively stop for a temporary period of indefinite length the number of immigrants into the United States. We could do this by simply advising our consuls to put every obstacle in the way and to require additional evidence and to resort to various administrative devices which would postpone and postpone and postpone the granting of the visas." One of his most powerful tools to keep out potential refugees and immigrants was the public charge rule, which barred the admission of persons deemed likely to become a burden on the state. The standards of proof of not being a public charge were constantly shifting, and that was used to intentionally prevent refugees and immigrants from gaining admission.

Ultimately, the effect of the immigration policies as enacted by Long's department was that, during American involvement in the war, ninety percent of the quota places available to immigrants from countries under German and Italian control were never filled. If they had been, an additional 190,000 people could have escaped the atrocities being committed by the Nazis. Rafael Medoff compared Long to Haman (Biblical nemesis of the Jews) due to his efforts to admit the least possible number of war refugees into the United States, a significant portion of whom were Jews.

In November 1943, when the House was considering two bills that would have established a separate government agency charged with assisting the rescue of Jewish refugees, Long gave secret testimony to the House Foreign Affairs Committee that the majority of 580,000 refugees admitted from Europe were Jewish, and that such legislation would be a rebuke of the State Department in wartime. Long noted in his diary that day that he erred by speaking without notes (the actual numbers were 568,000 visas authorized and only 545,000 issued), but historians have noted his testimony was misleading because he implied that all of the refugees were Jews.

An extreme racist, Long is largely remembered for his obstructionist role as the official responsible for granting refugee visas during World War II. He obstructed rescue attempts, drastically restricted immigration, and falsified figures of refugees admitted.

Long's deceptions were detected by his colleagues as well. In late 1943, a small group of Treasury Department career officials, horrified by reports of the mass slaughter of Jews by the Nazis, attempted to fund the release of some 70,000 Romanian Jews from Nazi hands. After Long effectively blocked them, the Treasury men began to look closely for evidence that the U.S. was actively avoiding steps that would save Jewish lives. The culmination of this research was a report presented to president Franklin Roosevelt in early 1944 by Treasury Secretary Henry Morgenthau Jr. The memo was titled, "Personal Report to the President," but the original title of the early drafts was the much angrier, "Report to the Secretary on the Acquiescence of This Government in the Murder of the Jews." Long featured prominently in the accusations in the report. The final paragraph of the earliest version read:

The State Department has turned its back on the time-honored principle of granting haven to refugees. The tempest-tossed get little comfort from men like Breckenridge Long. Long says the door to the oppressed is open but that it 'has been carefully screened.' What he should have said is 'barlocked and bolted.' ... If men of the temperament and philosophy of Long continue in control of immigration administration, we may as well take down that plaque from the Statue of Liberty and black out the 'lamp beside the golden door.'

The exposure of Long's misdeeds led to his demotion. He resigned from the State Department in November 1944 and went into retirement.

Long justified his actions in his diary by referring to the laws in the United States imposing strict quotas on the number of immigrants from particular countries, and his great concern about the possibility that Germany and the Soviet Union would infiltrate spies or subversive agents into the United States amidst the large numbers of refugees.

== Personal life ==
He married Christine Alexander Graham, a granddaughter of former U.S. Senator Francis Preston Blair Jr., in 1912.

His special interests included the collection of antiques, paintings and American ship models. He maintained a stable of thoroughbred race horses and was a director of the Laurel Park Racecourse in Laurel, Maryland. He enjoyed fox hunting, fishing, and sailing.

Long died in Laurel, Maryland, on September 26, 1958. His widow died in Palm Beach, Florida, in 1959, aged 71.

== Legacy ==
His personal papers are available for research at the Library of Congress.

In fiction, the character "Breckinridge Long", assistant Secretary of State, appears in Herman Wouk's War and Remembrance, B.A. Shapiro's The Muralist, and Graham Moore's The Wealth of Shadows. He was portrayed by Eddie Albert in the 1988 miniseries adaptation of Wouk's novel.

Party political offices
Preceded by Joseph W. Folk	Democratic nominee for Senator from Missouri (Class 3); 1920	Succeeded by Harry B. Hawes
Government offices
Preceded by William Phillips	Third Assistant Secretary of State; January 29, 1917 – June 8, 1920	Succeeded by Van Santvoord Merle-Smith
Diplomatic posts
Preceded by John W. Garrett	United States Ambassador to Italy; 1933–1936	Succeeded by William Phillips
