= Webster Davis =

American mayor (1861–1923)

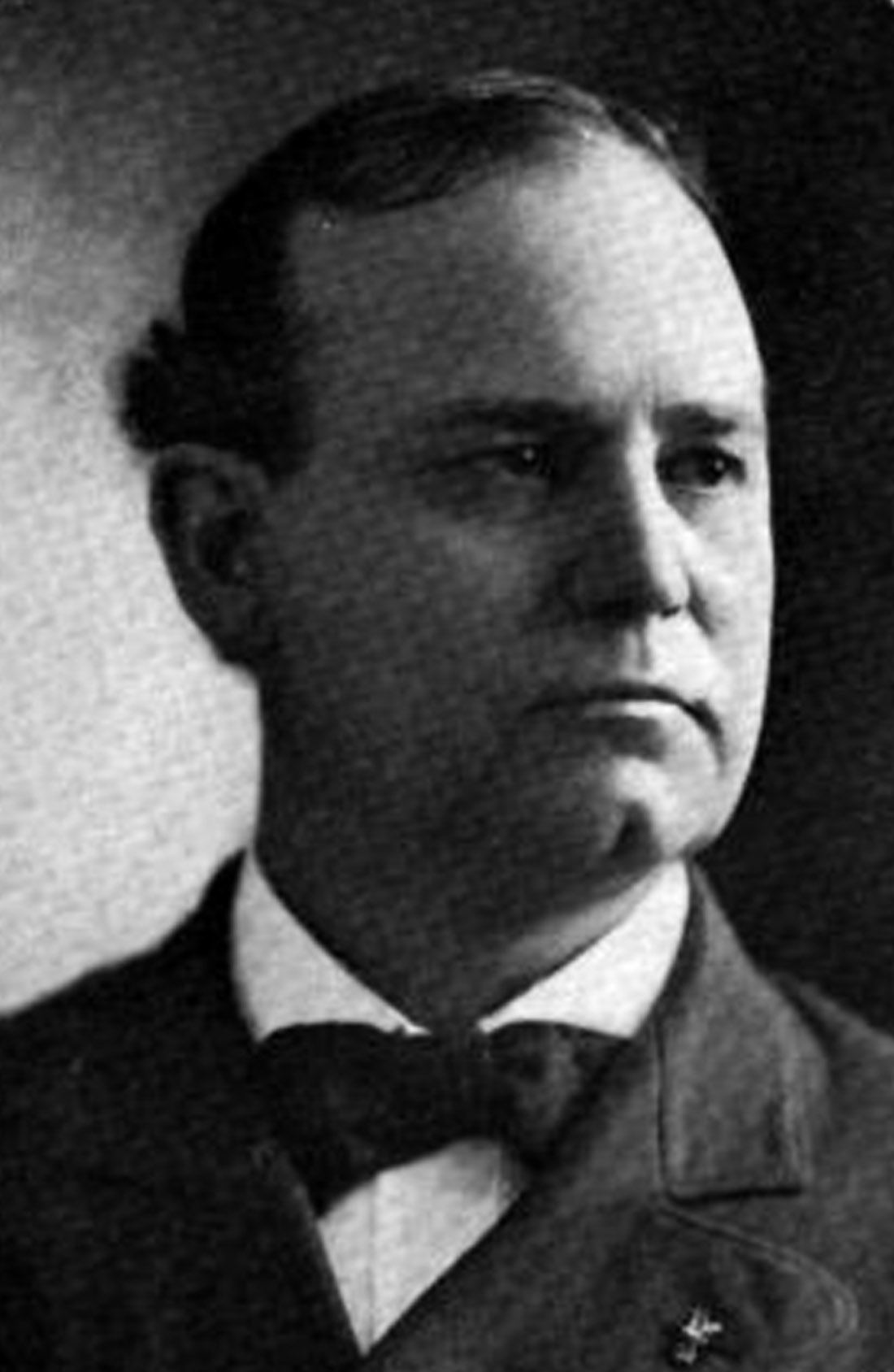

30th Mayor of Kansas City
- In office 1894–1896
- Preceded by: William S. Cowherd
- Succeeded by: James M. Jones

Personal details
- Born: June 1, 1861 Chicago, Illinois, U.S.
- Died: February 22, 1923 (aged 61) Kansas City, Missouri, U.S.
- Party: Republican
- Education: University of Michigan Law School

Webster Davis (June 1, 1861 – February 22, 1923) was a mayor of Kansas City, Missouri from 1894 to 1896 and was the Assistant Secretary of the Interior from 1897 to 1898.

== Early life ==
Davis was born on June 1, 1861, in Ebensburg, Pennsylvania. In 1868 his family moved to a farm in Chillicothe, Missouri and then to Gallatin, Missouri where his father began a shoemaking operation. He worked on the farm, clerked in a store and worked in his shoemaking business.

In 1881 Davis moved to Lake Forest, Illinois, where he was a lamplighter. He then returned to Gallatin, and resumed shoemaking and clerking. In 1882 Davis became a copyist in the law office of Shanklin, Low & McDougal and studied law while he worked there. In 1884 he attended the University of Kansas and became a lawyer initially practicing in Garden City, Kansas.

== Career ==
Davis became active in the Republican Party. After graduating from the University of Michigan Law School he moved to Kansas City, Missouri where he unsuccessfully ran for Congress in 1892.

Davis was elected as mayor of Kansas City in 1894. In 1897, Davis was appointed by President William McKinley as Assistant Secretary of the Interior.

He was forced to resign after an 1898 visit to South Africa when he sympathized with the Boers. Unable to get a plank supporting them in the Republican Party platform, he switched to being a Democrat. He wrote a book about the Boer War entitled John Bull's Crime: Or, Assaults on Republics which was published in 1901.

He died in Kansas City on February 22, 1923, and is buried in Elmwood Cemetery.

Political offices
Preceded by William S. Cowherd	Mayor of Kansas City, Missouri; 1894–1896	Succeeded by James M. Jones
