= George H. Williams (Missouri politician) =

American politician and attorney

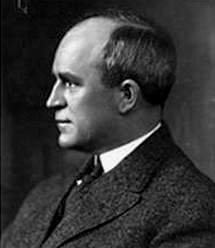

United States Senator from Missouri
- In office May 25, 1925 – December 5, 1926
- Appointed by: Sam Aaron Baker
- Preceded by: Selden P. Spencer
- Succeeded by: Harry B. Hawes

Personal details
- Born: December 1, 1871 California, Missouri, US
- Died: November 25, 1963 (aged 91) Sarasota, Florida, US
- Party: Republican
- Spouse: Harriet C. (Stewart) Williams
- Children: two sons
- Education: Drury College; Princeton University; Washington University
- Occupation: Attorney

George Howard Williams (December 1, 1871 – November 25, 1963) was an American politician and attorney from Missouri. A Republican, he served as U.S. Senator from Missouri from 1925 to 1926, completing the term of Selden P. Spencer following the latter's death.

== Early life ==
George H. Williams was born in California, Missouri to John Morrow and Alice Gray (Howard) Williams. His father was heavily involved in state and local politics, serving as a member of the Missouri Senate, a prosecuting attorney, and circuit judge. Following his graduation from California High School in 1889, George Williams attended college preparatory classes at Drury College in Springfield, Missouri. He then attended Princeton University, earning his degree in 1894. After Princeton George Williams taught for a short time at California High School while also studying law and clerking at his father's law office. He went on to further study at Washington University in St. Louis, receiving his LLB in 1897. Williams was admitted to the Missouri Bar the same year, at which time he established a law practice in St. Louis, Missouri

In June, 1900 Williams married Harriet Chase Stewart, daughter of prominent St. Louis attorney Alphonso Stewart and granddaughter of Confederate Civil War General Alexander P. Stewart. The couple had two sons. In 1902 Williams joined the law firm of his father-in-law.

== Politics ==
George Williams, long involved in Missouri Republican politics, was appointed a circuit court judge for the St. Louis region in 1906, a position he held until 1912. In that position he was a key player in developing a new juvenile code for Missouri, and took a strong interest in bettering the lives of children that lasted even after he left the court. As chair of the St. Louis Board of Children's Guardians, he helped establish Bellefontaine Farms, a home for troubled, orphaned, and abandoned children.

In 1922 Williams was named as a delegate to the Missouri Constitutional Convention, where his acumen for business law proved especially valuable. The convention allowed Williams to gain some name recognition around the state as well as he chaired several important committees. In 1923, in appreciation for his service, Missouri Valley College awarded him an honorary Doctor of Laws degree. With the unexpected death of Senator Selden Spencer in May, 1925 George H. Williams was tapped by Missouri Governor Sam Baker to fill the remaining eighteen months of Spencer's term until the 1926 general election. As senator, Williams served as a member of the Committee on Private Land Claims. George Williams defeated two fellow Republicans, David M. Proctor and Blodgdett Priest, with 56-percent of the vote to win the August 1926 U.S. Senate primary. However, in the November general election he lost to Democratic challenger Harry B. Hawes 52-percent to 48-percent.

== Later life ==
Following his senate defeat, George Williams returned to his St. Louis law practice until 1943 when he retired and moved to Matson, Missouri. Long interested in state and national history, Williams led an effort to preserve a St. Charles County, Missouri farm once owned by Daniel Boone. The effort was a success, with Lindenwood University now owning and operating the Historic Daniel Boone Home and Heritage Center near Defiance, Missouri. During his life George Williams was a financial backer of several colleges and universities, including his alma maters Drury College and Princeton as well as Westminster College and College of the Ozarks In 1950, George Williams moved once again, to Sarasota, Florida, where he died on November 25, 1963. He is buried in the Masonic Cemetery in California, Missouri.

Party political offices
Preceded by Selden P. Spencer	Republican nominee for U.S. Senator from Missouri (Class 3); 1926	Succeeded by Henry Kiel
U.S. Senate
Preceded by Selden P. Spencer	U.S. senator (Class 3) from Missouri; 1925–1926; Served alongside: James A. Reed	Succeeded by Harry B. Hawes
