= 1914 United States Senate election in Missouri =

- November 3, 1914
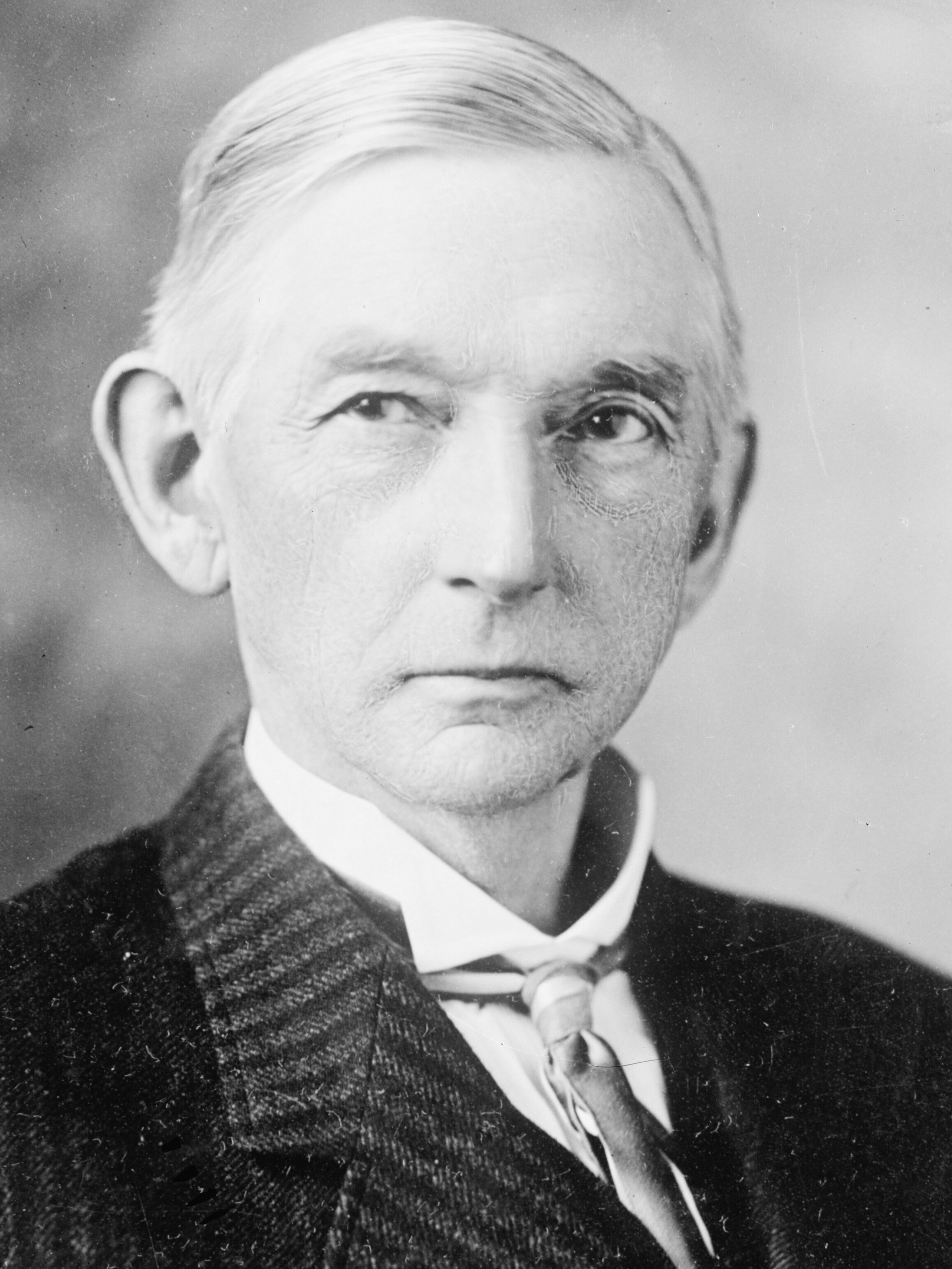

Nominee	William J. Stone	Thomas Akins
Party	Democratic	Republican
Popular vote	711,161	589,498
Percentage	50.4%	41.6%
- County results Stone: 40–50% 50–60% 60–70% 70–80% 80–90% Akins: 40–50% 50–60% 60–70% 70–80%
U.S. senator before election
William J. Stone
Democratic
Elected U.S. senator
William J. Stone
Democratic

The 1914 United States Senate election in Missouri took place on November 3, 1914, in Missouri. Incumbent Democratic Senator William J. Stone was re-elected to a third term in office. He defeated Thomas Akins of the Republican Party.

== Democratic primary ==
=== Candidates ===
- John M. Dawson, former Assistant Attorney General
- William J. Stone, the incumbent Senator
- William H. Wallace, lawyer

=== Results ===
Democratic primary August 4, 1914
Party	Candidate	Votes	%
Democratic	William J. Stone	184,730	71.88
Democratic	William H. Wallace	52,278	20.34
Democratic	John M. Dawson	19,976	7.77
Total votes		256,984	100

== Republican primary ==
=== Candidates ===
- Thomas Akins, former Postmaster of St. Louis
- Politte Elvins, former Representative for the 13th congressional district

=== Results ===
Republican primary August 4, 1914
Party	Candidate	Votes	%
Republican	Thomas Akins	75,366	63.54
Republican	Politte Elvins	43,234	36.45
Total votes		118,600	100

== Other candidates ==
=== Progressive ===
Progressive primary August 4, 1914
Party	Candidate	Votes	%
Progressive	Arthur N. Sager	5,614	100
Total votes		5,614	100

=== Prohibition ===
The Prohibition Party nominated Orange J. Hill, a member of the Drury College board of trustees and the Prohibition candidate in the 1904 gubernatorial election.

=== Socialist ===
Socialist primary August 4, 1914
Party	Candidate	Votes	%
Socialist	Thomas E. Greene	4,261	100
Total votes		4,261	100

=== Socialist Labor ===
The Socialist Labor Party of America nominated J. W. Molineaux.

== Results ==
1914 U.S. Senate election in Missouri
Party	Candidate	Votes	%
Democratic	William J. Stone (incumbent)	311,616	50.41%
Republican	Thomas Akins	257,054	41.58%
Progressive	Arthur N. Sager	27,609	4.47%
Socialist	Thomas E. Greene	17,061	2.76%
Prohibition	Orange J. Hill	3,636	0.59%
Socialist Labor	J. W. Molineaux	1,251	0.20%
Majority		54,562	8.83%
Total votes		618,227	100.00%
Democratic hold			
