= William J. Stone =

American politician (1848–1918)

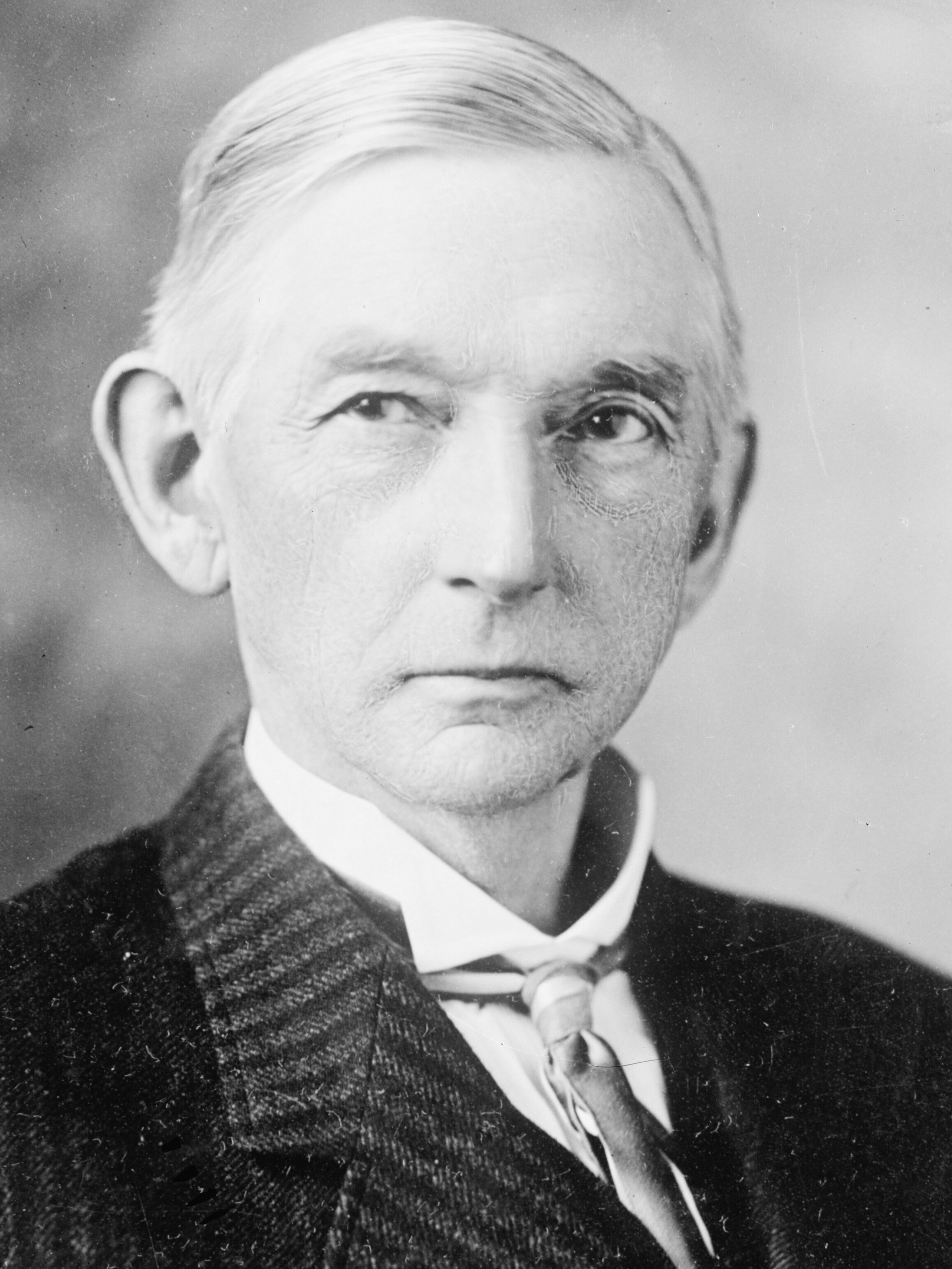
- Stone, 1909–1918

United States Senator from Missouri
- In office March 4, 1903 – April 14, 1918
- Preceded by: George G. Vest
- Succeeded by: Xenophon P. Wilfley

28th Governor of Missouri
- In office January 9, 1893 – January 11, 1897
- Lieutenant: John Baptiste O'Meara
- Preceded by: David R. Francis
- Succeeded by: Lawrence Vest Stephens

Member of the U.S. House of Representatives from Missouri's 12th district
- In office March 4, 1885 – March 3, 1891
- Preceded by: Charles H. Morgan
- Succeeded by: David A. De Armond

Personal details
- Born: William Joel Stone; May 7, 1848 Madison County, Kentucky, U.S.
- Died: April 14, 1918 (aged 69) Washington, D.C., U.S.
- Party: Democratic
- Spouse: Sarah Louise Winston (1852–1933)

William Joel Stone (May 7, 1848 – April 14, 1918) was a Democratic politician from Missouri who represented his state in the United States House of Representatives from 1885 to 1891, and in the U.S. Senate from 1903 until his death; he also served as the 28th governor of Missouri from 1893 to 1897.

== Biography ==
Stone was born near Richmond in Madison County, Kentucky, on May 7, 1848, and attended Richmond's public schools as a child; he graduated from the University of Missouri in Columbia in 1867, whereupon he began the study of law. Admitted to the bar in 1869, he began practice that year in Bedford, Indiana. Soon he moved back to Columbia, where he was the city attorney for a time in 1870. Later that year he moved to Nevada, Missouri, and continued his practice, becoming the Vernon County prosecuting attorney from 1873 to 1874 and was a presidential elector for the Democratic ticket in 1876.

In 1884, Stone was elected to the House of Representatives, where he served until 1891; he did not seek renomination in 1890. In his time there, he served as the chairman of the Committee on War Claims. From 1893 to 1897, he served as Missouri's governor, moving to Jefferson City in 1893. Beginning in 1896, he served as a member of the Democratic National Committee, serving in this capacity until 1904; he was the committee's vice-chairman from 1900 until his departure. In 1897, Stone moved to St. Louis, where he continued his practice; he returned to Jefferson City in 1903. In 1902, he was elected to the Senate, being reelected in 1908 and serving until his death.

Stone served as a member of the Senate Foreign Relations Committee, and chaired that important committee from 1913 until his death. In this capacity, he was involved in disagreements with the Wilson administration concerning European policy before the U.S. entry into World War I. He was one of the six U.S. Senators who voted against the United States declaration of war against Germany on April 4, 1917 (the other five were Asle J. Gronna, Republican from North Dakota, Robert M. La Follette, Republican from Wisconsin, Harry Lane, Democrat from Oregon, George W. Norris, Republican from Nebraska, and James K. Vardaman, Democrat from Mississippi). He supported the acquisition of the U.S. Virgin Islands. Stone also served at various times as chairman of the Committee on Additional Accommodations for the Library, the Committee on Revolutionary Claims, the Committee on Corporations Organized in the District of Columbia, and the Committee on Indian Affairs.

Stone died in Washington, D.C., on April 14, 1918; he is buried in Nevada, Missouri. His seat was filled until the 1918 election by Xenophon P. Wilfley. Some of Stone's personal and official papers are archived at the State Historical Society of Missouri, where they are open to researchers.

His son, Kimbrough Stone (1875 – 1958), served as a circuit judge of the United States Court of Appeals for the Eighth Circuit.

== See also ==
- List of members of the United States Congress who died in office (1900–1949)

Party political offices
Preceded by David R. Francis	Democratic nominee for Governor of Missouri; 1892	Succeeded by Lon Vest Stephens
First	Democratic nominee for Senator from Missouri (Class 3); 1914	Succeeded by Joseph W. Folk
U.S. House of Representatives
Preceded by Charles H. Morgan	Member of the U.S. House of Representatives from Missouri's 12th congressional district 1885–1891	Succeeded by David A. De Armond
Political offices
Preceded by David R. Francis	Governor of Missouri; 1893–1897	Succeeded by Lon Vest Stephens
U.S. Senate
Preceded by George G. Vest	U.S. senator (Class 3) from Missouri; 1903–1918; Served alongside: Francis Cockrell, William Warner, James A. Reed	Succeeded by Xenophon P. Wilfley
