= 1920 United States Senate election in Missouri =

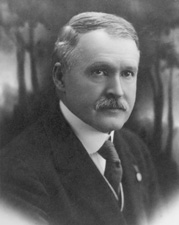

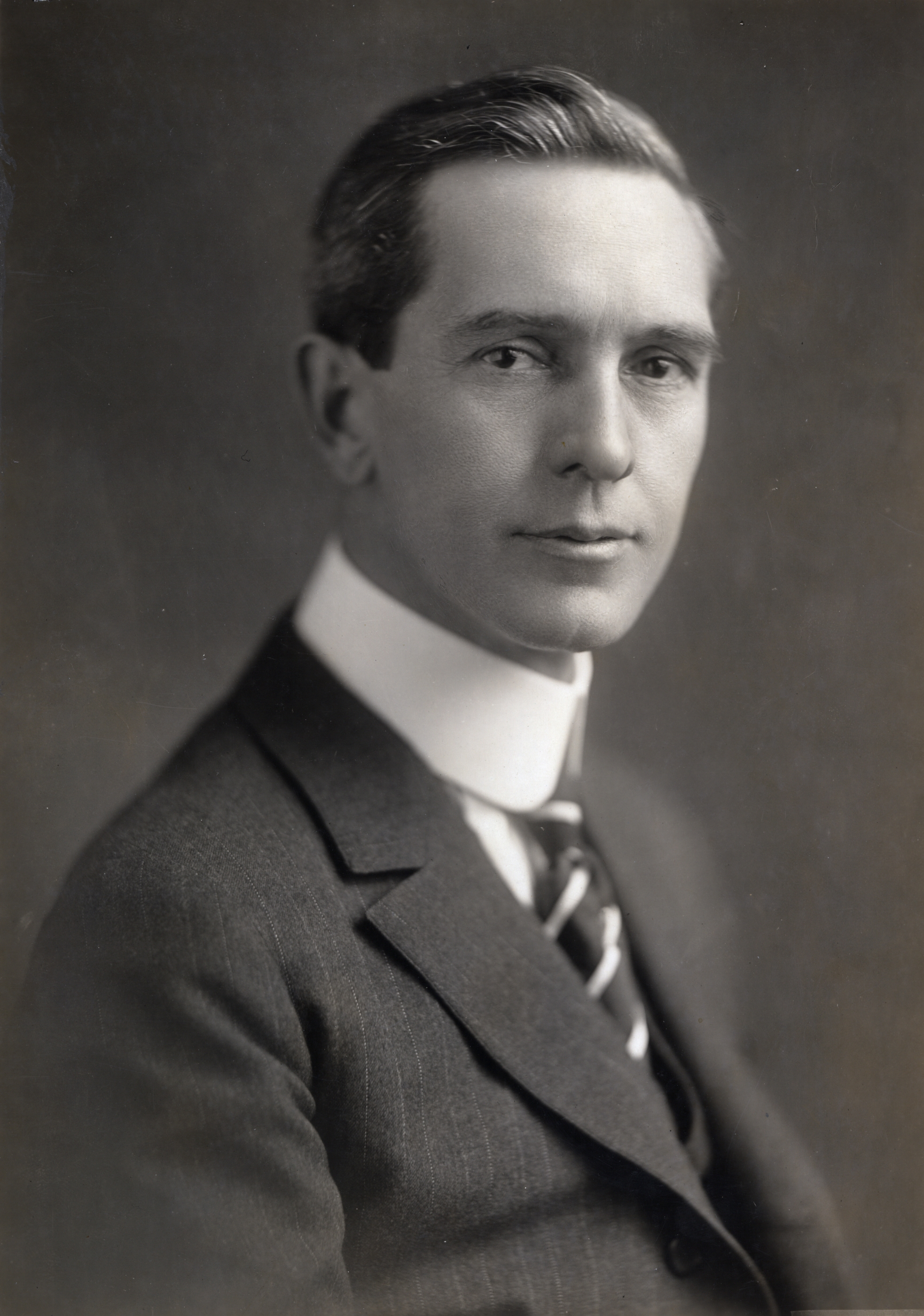
Nominee	Selden P. Spencer	Breckinridge Long
Party	Republican	Democratic
Popular vote	711,161	589,498
Percentage	53.65%	44.47%
- County results Spencer: 40–50% 50–60% 60–70% 70–80% 80–90% Long: 40–50% 50–60% 60–70% 70–80% 80–90%
U.S. senator before election
Selden P. Spencer
Republican
Elected U.S. senator
Selden P. Spencer
Republican

The 1920 United States Senate election in Missouri took place on November 2, 1920, in Missouri. The incumbent Republican Senator, Selden P. Spencer, was re-elected to a full term, having won a special election in 1918. He defeated Breckinridge Long of the Democratic Party. Spencer underperformed Republican presidential nominee Warren G. Harding, who won 54.6% of the vote in the concurrent presidential election.

== Democratic primary ==
=== Candidates ===
- Charles M. Hay, former State Representative for Callaway County
- John C. Higdon, lawyer
- Arthur N. Lindsey, pastor
- Breckinridge Long, former Assistant Secretary of State
- George H. Scruton, editor of the Sedalia Democrat
- Henry Samuel Priest, former judge for the United States District Court for the Eastern District of Missouri

=== Results ===
Democratic primary August 3, 1920
Party	Candidate	Votes	%
Democratic	Breckinridge Long	65,825	37.40
Democratic	Charles M. Hay	44,504	25.29
Democratic	Henry Samuel Priest	40,637	23.09
Democratic	Arthur N. Lindsey	15,631	8.88
Democratic	John C. Higdon	5,998	3.41
Democratic	George H. Scruton	3,407	1.94
Total votes		176,002	100

== Republican primary ==
=== Candidates ===
- Dwight F. Davis, adjutant and former Olympic tennis player
- James L. Minnis, former attorney
- Selden P. Spencer, the incumbent Senator

=== Results ===
Republican primary August 3, 1920
Party	Candidate	Votes	%
Republican	Selden P. Spencer	95,867	49.74
Republican	Dwight F. Davis	73,541	38.16
Republican	James L. Minnis	23,341	12.11
Total votes		192,729	100

== Other candidates ==
=== Farmer–Worker ===
The Farmer–Worker Party nominated carpenter W. J. Mallett.

=== Socialist ===
Socialist primary August 3, 1920
Party	Candidate	Votes	%
Socialist	Elias F. Hodges	1,515	100
Total votes		1,515	100

=== Socialist Labor ===
The Socialist Labor Party nominated Andrew Trudell.

== Results ==
1920 United States Senate election in Missouri
Party	Candidate	Votes	%	±%
Republican	Selden P. Spencer (Incumbent)	711,161	53.65%	+1.26
Democratic	Breckinridge Long	589,498	44.47%	−1.82
Socialist	Elias F. Hodges	1,807	0.18%	−1.33
Farmer–Worker	W. J. Mallett	3,158	0.24%	+0.24
Socialist Labor	Andrew Trudell	1,675	0.13%	−0.03
Majority		121,663	9.18%	
Turnout		1,325,494		
Republican hold		Swing		
