= Selden P. Spencer =

American lawyer and politician

Selden Palmer Spencer
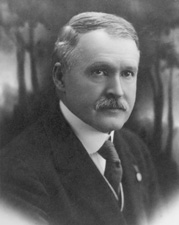

United States Senator from Missouri
- In office November 6, 1918 – May 16, 1925
- Preceded by: Xenophon P. Wilfley
- Succeeded by: George H. Williams

Member of the Missouri House of Representatives
- In office 1895

Personal details
- Born: September 16, 1862 Erie, Pennsylvania, U.S.
- Died: May 16, 1925 (aged 62) Washington, D.C., U.S.
- Resting place: Bellefontaine Cemetery
- Party: Republican
- Spouse: Susan Mary (Brookes) Spencer
- Children: 5
- Education: Yale College; Washington University in St. Louis
- Profession: Lawyer, educator

Selden Palmer Spencer (September 16, 1862 – May 16, 1925) was an American lawyer and politician. A Republican, he was a United States senator from Missouri.

== Early life ==
Selden Spencer was born in Erie, Pennsylvania, to Samuel Selden and Eliza Deborah (Palmer) Spenser. He received his basic education in Erie before attending Hopkins School, a college preparatory school in New Haven, Connecticut. Afterward Spencer attended Yale College, where he was an editor of the student newspaper and participated in Lacrosse. He graduated in 1884 with honors, seventh in a class of one hundred fifty. He then moved to St. Louis, Missouri, to attend Washington University School of Law graduating in 1886.

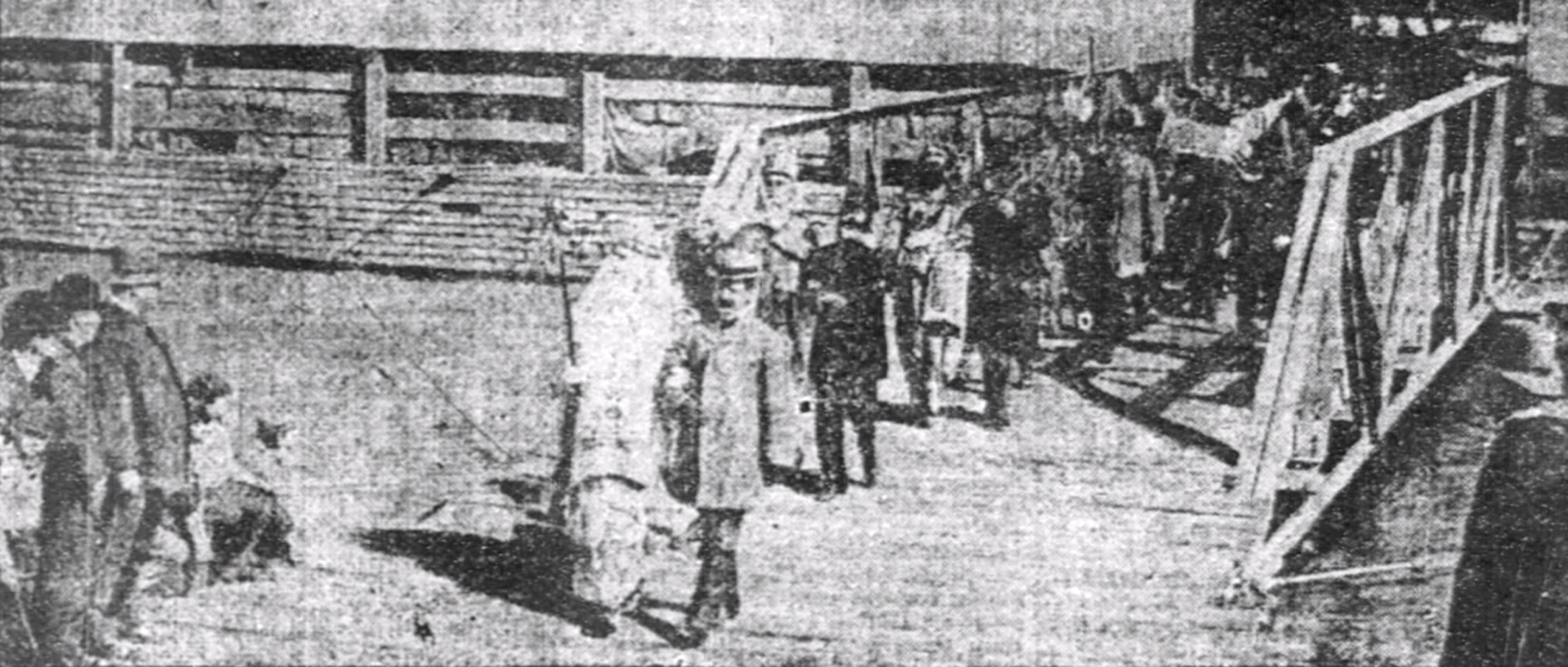
Judge Selden P. Spencer leads St. Louis's Veiled Prophet from the riverboat War Eagle to the dock at Jefferson Barracks in October 1892.

Admitted to the bar in 1886, Spencer opened a law practice in St. Louis with future Missouri governor Forrest Donnell while also serving as a professor of medical jurisprudence at the Missouri Medical College. The college later honored him with an honorary M.D. degree in appreciation of his efforts. Westminster College in Fulton, Missouri, also granted him honorary Ph.D and LL.D degrees.

== Politics ==
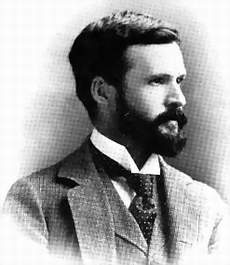
Selden P. Spencer, around 1897

Selden Spencer first held elected office in 1895 when he was voted a member of the Missouri House of Representatives. While in the Missouri House he was Chairman of the Committee on Banks and Banking, as well as on the Judiciary, Ways and Means, Militia, and Rules Committees. From 1897 to 1903 he was a judge of the United States circuit court. At the end of his term on the court Spencer returned to his law practice. He also became heavily involved with the American Bar Association, serving on its executive board and as vice-president in 1914. Spencer was a member of the Missouri State Militia, attaining the rank of captain. During World War I he was chairman of a St. Louis area draft board.

The unexpected death of Missouri U.S. Senator William J. Stone in April, 1918 prompted Selden Spencer's return to political office. Xenophon P. Wilfley was appointed a temporary replacement until a special election could be held. In November, 1918 Spencer defeated former Governor Joseph W. Folk with 52-percent of the vote to fill the remaining two years of Stone's term. In 1920 Selden Spencer won reelection, first by defeating tennis star-turned-politician Dwight F. Davis in the Republican primary, then Democrat Breckinridge Long by over 121,000 votes in the November general election.

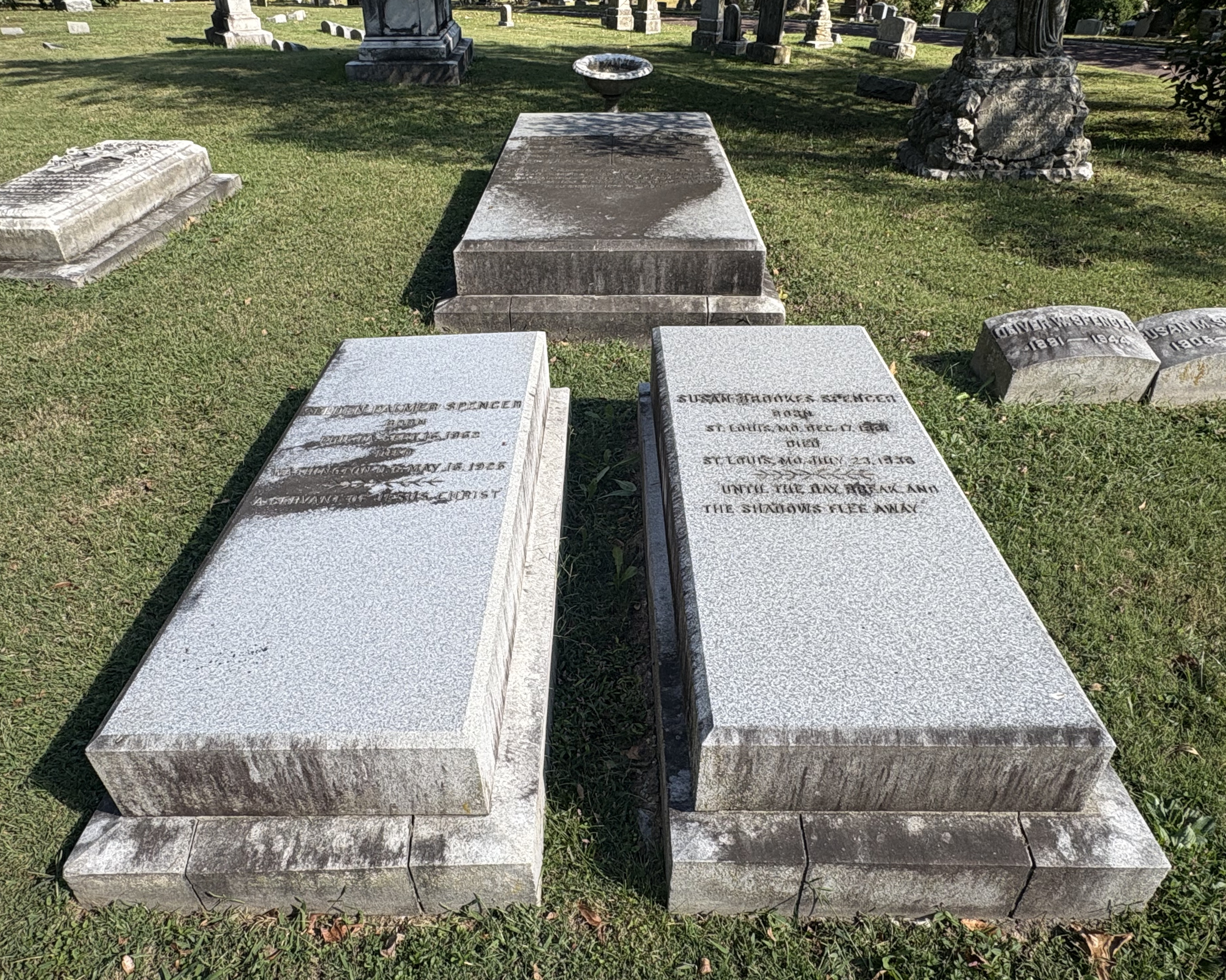
Spencer's grave at Bellefontaine Cemetery

Spencer was a supporter of the Korean independence movement, and wrote critically of Japan's violent suppression of Korea's peaceful 1919 March First Movement protests.

While in the Senate, he was chairman of the Committee on Claims (Sixty-sixth and Sixty-seventh Congresses) and a member of the Committee on Indian Affairs (Sixty-seventh Congress) and the Committee on Privileges and Elections (Sixty-seventh through Sixty-ninth Congresses). Senator Spencer was also noted for being one of the Republicans in opposition to the Treaty of Versailles and America's participation in the League of Nations, working with Senator Henry Cabot Lodge and the Irreconcilables. Senator Spencer made numerous speeches against the treaty while campaigning for fellow Republicans in 1920 and 1922. Senator Selden P. Spencer died at Walter Reed Hospital in Washington, D.C., on May 16, 1925, following complications from hernia surgery. He is buried in Bellefontaine Cemetery in St. Louis.

== See also ==
- List of members of the United States Congress who died in office (1900–1949)

Party political offices
Preceded by Thomas J. Akins	Republican nominee for U.S. Senator from Missouri (Class 3); 1918, 1920	Succeeded by George Howard Williams
U.S. Senate
Preceded by Xenophon P. Wilfley	U.S. senator (Class 3) from Missouri; 1918–1925; Served alongside: James A. Reed	Succeeded by George H. Williams
