= Barbara Shapiro =

American author

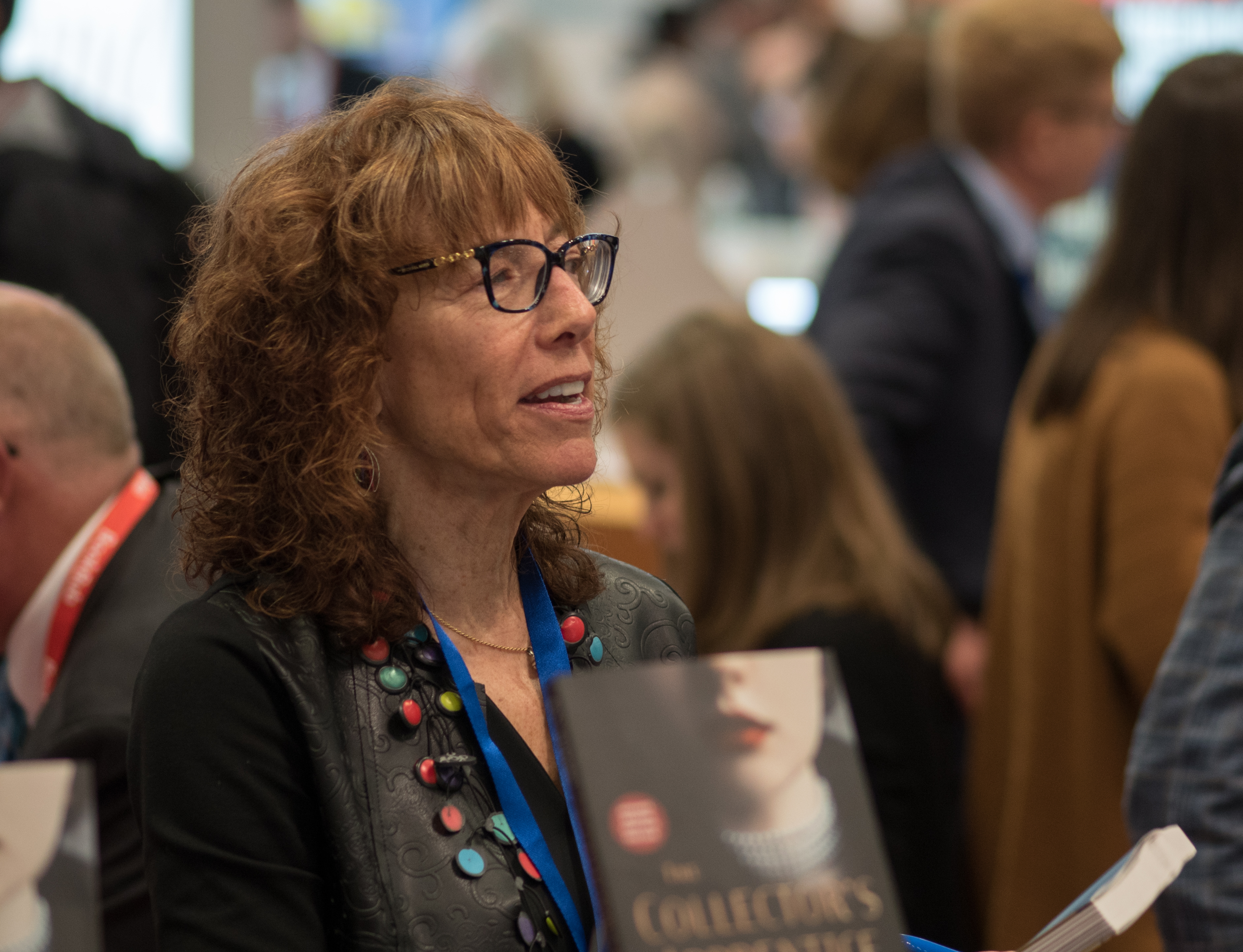
Shapiro at BookExpo America in 2018

Barbara Shapiro, or B.A., or Xixi Shapiro, is an American author. Her initial works were published as Barbara Shapiro; her recent novels are styled as authored by B.A. Shapiro.

== Works ==
She has written novels, screenplays, and a non-fiction self-help book.

=== Novels ===
- The Muralist
- The Art Forger The book is based on the unsolved Isabella Stewart Gardner Museum theft of thirteen works of art.
- The Safe Room
- Blind Spot
- See No Evil
- Blameless
- Shattered Echoes
- The Collector's Apprentice
- Metropolis

=== Screenplays ===
- Blind Spot
- The Lost Coven
- Borderline
- Shattered Echoes

=== Non-fiction book ===
- The Big Squeeze: Balancing the Needs of Aging Parents, Dependent Children, and You (1991)

== Awards ==
Shapiro received the 2013 New England Book Award for Fiction, a 2013 Massachusetts Must-Read Book award, and a 2012 Boston Globe Best Crime Book award. She was nominated for a 2013 Massachusetts Book Award.
