= Joseph W. Folk =

American politician (1869–1923)

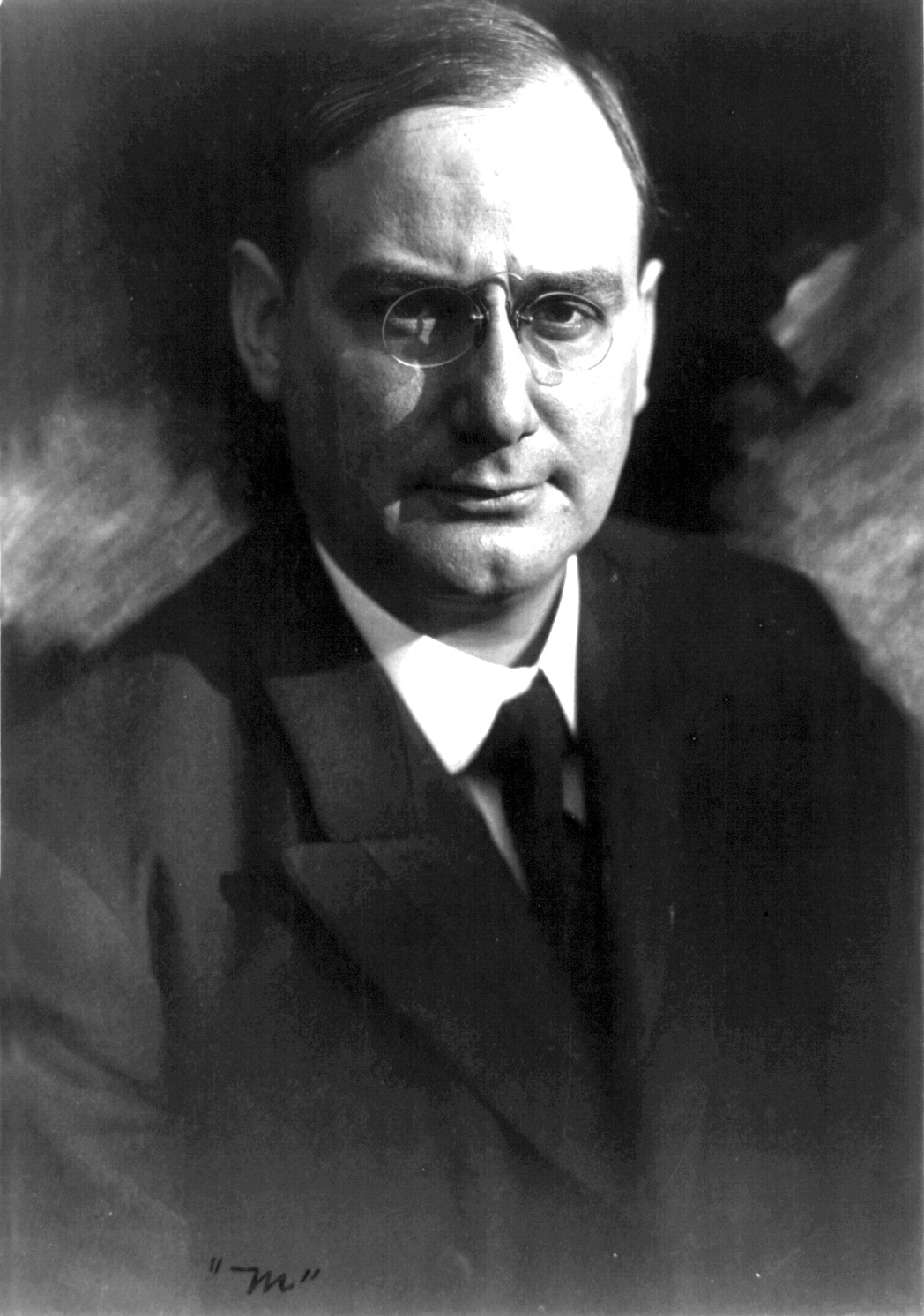
- Folk in 1904

31st Governor of Missouri
- In office January 9, 1905 – January 11, 1909
- Lieutenant: John C. McKinley
- Preceded by: Alexander M. Dockery
- Succeeded by: Herbert S. Hadley

Personal details
- Born: Joseph Wingate Folk; October 28, 1869 Brownsville, Tennessee, U.S.
- Died: May 28, 1923 (aged 53) New York City, U.S.
- Party: Democratic
- Education: Vanderbilt University

Joseph "Holy Joe" Wingate Folk (October 28, 1869 – May 28, 1923) was an American lawyer, reformer, and politician from St. Louis, Missouri. He was the 31st governor of Missouri from 1905 to 1909.

== Early life and education ==
Joseph Folk was born in Brownsville, Tennessee, to Henry Bate and Martha Estes Folk and raised in a strict Baptist household. His early education was completed at Brownsville Academy, after which he worked for several companies in Memphis, Tennessee as a clerk and bookkeeper. Folk studied law and graduated from Vanderbilt University in 1890. While at Vanderbilt, he was initiated by the Chi chapter of Kappa Alpha Order on October 20, 1888. He joined his father's law firm and focused on criminal law.

Early in his career, Folk ran for a seat in the Tennessee House of Representatives in 1892, wrote newspaper articles, spoke on special occasions, and joined the Knights of Pythias. In 1893, he moved to St. Louis to join his uncle's law practice. Folk married Gertrude Glass on November 10, 1896. He helped to organize the Jefferson Club, a local young Democrats' organization, and acted as the group's president in 1898–1899.

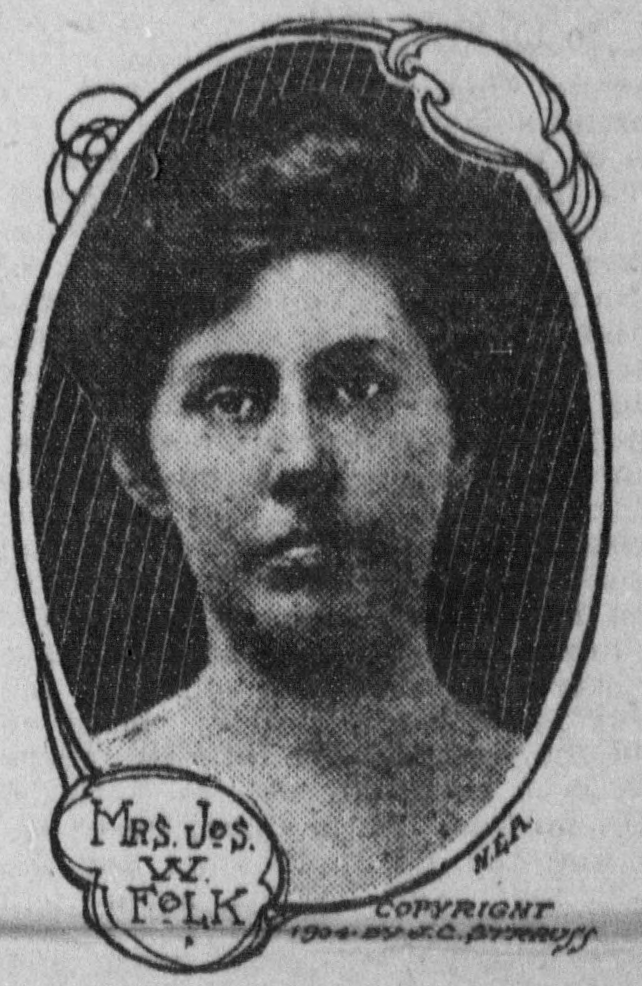
Gertrude Glass Folk, labeled here "Mrs. Jos. W. Folk"

Folk had five brothers. His older brother Reau E. Folk served as Tennessee State Treasurer.

== St. Louis career ==
Folk made his reputation as a lawyer for transit workers in the St. Louis Streetcar Strike of 1900. His work as mediator earned him a Democratic nomination for circuit attorney in 1900, and he won the election against Judge Eugene Mcquillen.

Folk earned his nickname by attacking local corruption and party machines. With the assistance of Lincoln Steffens's articles published in McClure's magazine, Folk led investigations of the city's Democratic boss, Col. Ed Butler and the corrupt "boodle ring" of corporate bribery in the state and municipal government. Although some of the convictions Folk obtained were overturned on appeal, his work had national and international consequences. Folk gained the respect of Republican President Theodore Roosevelt as he and other crusading prosecutors and muckraking journalists brought national attention to municipal corruption. Folk's prosecution of the Suburban Railway Company stimulated a change in US treaties with Mexico to include bribery as grounds for extradition. As district attorney, Folk encountered opposition from many businessmen and politicians, who believed that his exposing corrupt practices hurt the city's reputation, and thus the Democratic party as well as the business climate.

== Governor ==
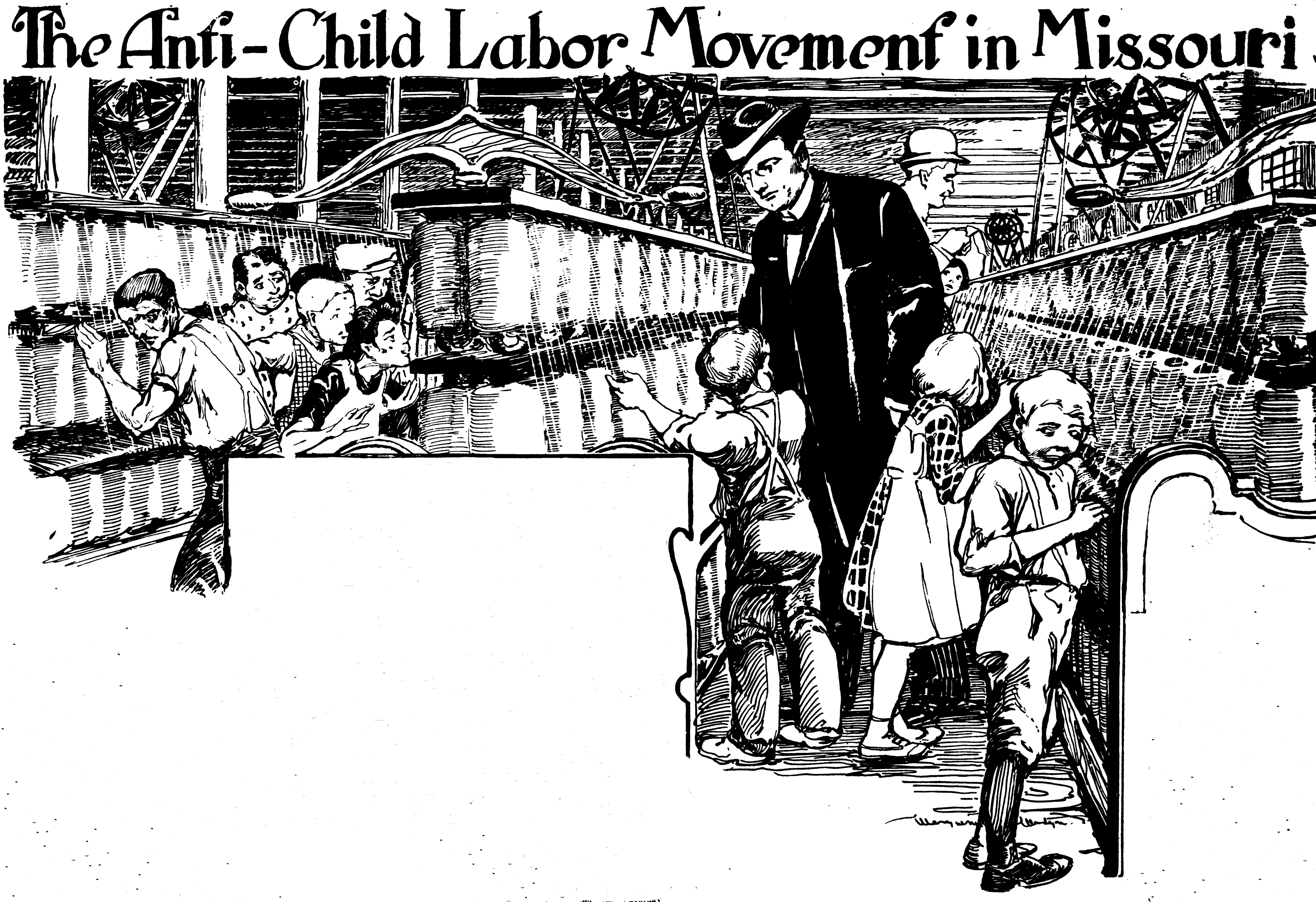
Governor Folk inspecting child laborers in 1906 in an image drawn by journalist Marguerite Martyn

Folk was elected the 31st Governor of Missouri as a progressive reformer and Democrat in the 1904 election. In the governor's office, he advocated the "Missouri Idea", the concept of Missouri as a leader in public morality through popular control of law and strict enforcement. His administration found initial success despite opposition and successfully conducted antitrust prosecutions, ended gratis railroad passes for state officials, extended bribery statues, improved election laws, required formal registration for lobbyists, made racetrack gambling illegal, and enforced the Sunday-closing law. The latter half of Folk's gubernatorial term found a Democratically controlled General Assembly, in large part due to Folk's reforms. The governor was able to enact further legislation, including an initiative and referendum amendment to the Constitution of Missouri, and further regulation of elections, education, employment and child labor, railroads, food, business, and public utilities. A number of examiner boards and commissions were established during Folk's administration, including many agricultural boards and the Missouri library commission.

== Later career ==
Following his gubernatorial term, Folk's focus on morality and unwillingness to compromise eventually made him politically unpopular, and his initial attempts for a senate nomination were unsuccessful. He returned to law practice, toured as a Chautauqua speaker, and campaigned for Woodrow Wilson. Wilson appointed Folk as a solicitor for the US State Department, where he investigated major railroad companies. In 1918, he won a Democratic nomination for the US Senate, but lost in the election. After a brief stint at the St. Louis Chamber of Commerce, Folk opened a private law office in Washington, D.C. He arbitrated in several international negotiations.

Folk experienced a nervous breakdown in March 1922, believed to be from overwork. He died aged 53 in 1923 in New York City, and is buried at the Oakwood Cemetery in Brownsville, Tennessee.

His Washington, D.C., residence is now the Embassy of Mauritania. A 1943 Liberty ship was named in his honor.

Party political offices
Preceded by Alexander Monroe Dockery	Democratic nominee for Governor of Missouri; 1904	Succeeded by William S. Cowherd
Preceded by William J. Stone	Democratic nominee for Senator from Missouri (Class 3); 1918	Succeeded by Breckinridge Long
Political offices
Preceded by Alexander M. Dockery	Governor of Missouri; 1905–1909	Succeeded by Herbert S. Hadley
