= Magoffin =

Magoffin may refer to:

== People ==
- Andy Magoffin, Canadian musician and record producer
- Beriah Magoffin (1815–1885), American politician, Governor of Kentucky, and brother of Ebenezer Magoffin
- Ebenezer Magoffin (1817-1865), Confederate officer and brother of Beriah Magoffin
- Paul Magoffin (1883–1956), American football player
- Ralph Van Deman Magoffin (1874–1942), American academic
- Steve Magoffin (born 1979), Australian cricketer
- Susan Shelby Magoffin (1827–1855), American diarist

== Places ==
- Magoffin County, Kentucky
- Magoffin Homestead, El Paso, Texas

== Other uses ==
- USS Magoffin (APA-199), a US Navy attack transport

== See also ==
- MacGuffin
