= Ordinance of Secession =

Document issued by seceding US states

Mississippi Secession Convention (1861)

An Ordinance of Secession is the name given to multiple resolutions drafted and ratified in 1860 and 1861, before or soon after the beginning of the American Civil War, by which each seceding Southern state (and Arizona Territory) formally declared secession from the United States. South Carolina, Mississippi, Georgia, and Texas also issued separate documents purporting to justify secession.

Adherents of the Union side in the Civil War regarded secession as illegal by any means, and President Abraham Lincoln, drawing in part on the legacy of President Andrew Jackson, regarded it as his job to preserve the Union by force, if necessary. However, President James Buchanan, in his State of the Union Address of December 3, 1860, stated that the Union rested only upon public opinion, and that conciliation was the only legitimate means of preserving it; President Thomas Jefferson had also suggested, after his presidency but in official correspondence in 1816, that the secession of some states might be desirable.

Beginning with South Carolina in December 1860, eleven Southern states and one territory each ratified an ordinance of secession and effected de facto secession by some regular or purportedly lawful means, including by state legislative action, special convention, or popular referendum, as sustained by state public opinion and mobilized military force. Both sides in the Civil War regarded these eleven states and territory as de facto seceded.

Two other slave states, Missouri and Kentucky, attempted secession ineffectively or only by irregular means. These two states remained within the Union, but were regarded by the Confederacy as having seceded. Two remaining slave states, Delaware and Maryland, rejected secession and were not regarded by either side as having seceded. These four states were known as the border states, and, because they remained in the Union, they were not covered by the Emancipation Proclamation. In 1863 a Unionist government in western Virginia created a new state from 50 western counties, which entered the Union as West Virginia. The new state included 24 counties that had ratified Virginia's secession ordinance.

== Timeline ==
Results by county Yes: 50–60%; 60–70%; 70–80%; 80–90%; 90–100%; No: 50–60%; 60–70%; 70–80%; 80–90%; 90–100%

Results by county Yes: 50–60%; 60–70%; 70–80%; 80–90%; 90–100%; No: 50–60%; 60–70%; 70–80%; 80–90%; 90–100%

Results by county Yes: 50–60%; 60–70%; 70–80%; 80–90%; 90–100%; No: 50–60%; 60–70%; 70–80%; 80–90%; 90–100%

Results by county Yes: 50–60%; 60–70%; 70–80%; 80–90%; 90–100%; No: 50–60%; 60–70%; 70–80%; 80–90%; 90–100%

In the following table, states in italics either chose not to secede or could not effectively do so.

State	Rejected	Approved	Referendum	Vote
South Carolina		December 20, 1860		
Delaware (Note: Did not secede)	January 3, 1861			
Mississippi		January 9, 1861		
Florida		January 10, 1861		
Alabama		January 11, 1861		
Georgia		January 19, 1861		
Louisiana		January 26, 1861		
Texas		February 1, 1861	February 23, 1861	46,153–14,747
Confederate States of America provisionally constituted February 8, 1861 (Note: Excluding Texas, which joined between March 1 and 5, 1861.)
Tennessee (Note: First referendum)	February 9, 1861 (Note: On January 19 the Tennessee legislature, in a special session beginning January 7, required a potential secession convention to be put to referendum on February 9. Voters rejected the convention, and by extension any secession. Had it convened, it would have been overwhelmingly pro-Union. Thousands of pro-Union Tennesseans voted for the convention aiming for it to fail.)		February 9, 1861	59,499–68,262
Arizona Territory		March 16, 1861		
Virginia	April 4, 1861	April 17, 1861	May 23, 1861	132,201–37,451
Maryland	April 29, 1861			
Arkansas		May 6, 1861		
Tennessee (Note: Second referendum)		May 6, 1861 (Note: Public opinion had shifted dramatically, most notably in Middle Tennessee.)	June 8, 1861	104,471–47,183
North Carolina		May 20, 1861		
Missouri (Note: Ineffective)		October 31, 1861		
Kentucky		November 20, 1861		

The first seven seceding states, all of the Deep South, were motivated mainly by the 1860 election of President Lincoln, who had very little support among Southern voters, and the direct threat to slavery his election posed. The next four seceding states, further north, were also motivated by these factors but also by the fact that the Civil War had begun.

In Missouri and Kentucky, attempted secession was belated, severely disrupted, lacked sufficient popular support, and failed. In Missouri, the state government called a convention whose members disfavored secession. Union military intervention quickly restored Union control, first in St. Louis, then throughout nearly the whole state. The ineffective Missouri ordinance of secession was eventually passed only by a rump convention in Neosho. In Kentucky, whose potential secession Unionists particularly feared, both the legislature and public opinion firmly opposed secession. Only an even less influential rump convention purported to secede. When Confederate armies invaded Kentucky in 1862, bringing extra arms to equip new volunteers, briefly seizing the state capital, and installing an ephemeral state government, local recruitment proved weak and Union forces soon decisively defeated the invasion. Despite Missouri and Kentucky remaining within the Union, thousands from both states embraced secession by choosing to fight for the Confederacy.

Elsewhere, the Delaware legislature quickly and firmly rejected secession, despite lobbying from states intending to secede. President Lincoln's suspension of habeas corpus and overwhelming Union military intervention, aimed at protecting Washington, blocked the Maryland legislature or any other group in Maryland from considering secession. This occurred after the legislature overwhelmingly rejected calling a secession convention but retained some notion of limiting cooperation with the Union and military coercion. Geographic exposure to conflict between larger neighboring states also deterred secession in Delaware and Maryland. As in Missouri and Kentucky, thousands from Delaware and Maryland also fought for the Confederacy. The unorganized Indian Territory did not declare secession and was not unanimous in its orientation, but generally supported the Confederacy. No other state or territory contemplated secession, and the Confederacy did not claim Delaware or Maryland as member states.

Bitter, violent controversy remained even in states where a popular majority clearly favored secession. A geographic correlation existed between local prevalence of slavery and support for secession. Beyond Virginia, effective secession in most of a state could critically destabilize or virtually eliminate state government control over a region where people strongly rejected secession and favored the Union, such as East Tennessee and other areas. Thousands from seceding states, including slaves where the opportunity arose, also chose to fight for the Union.

== Georgia ==
Ordinance of Secession (Georgia)
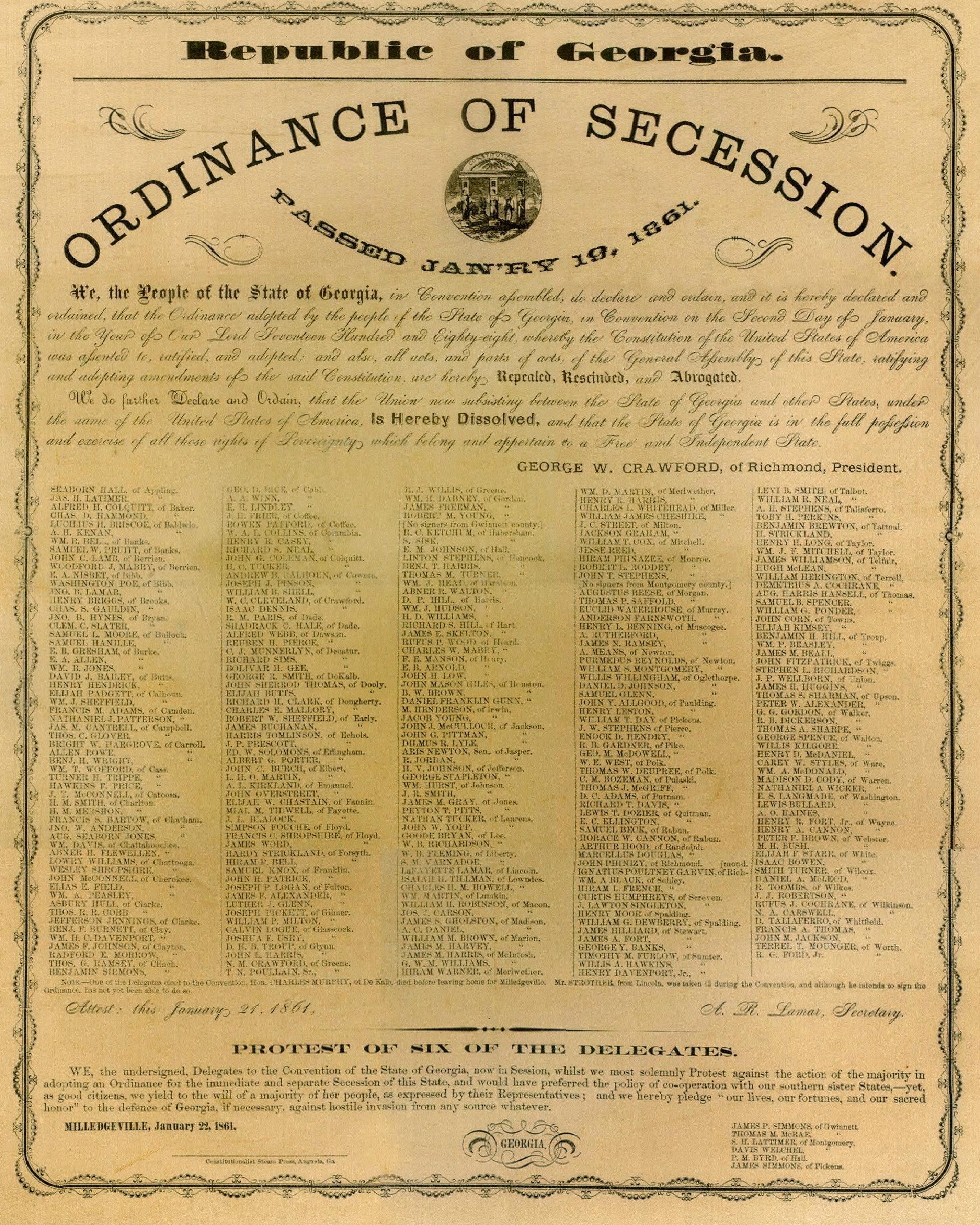
- Copy of the 1861 Ordinance of Secession signed by 293 delegates to the Georgia Secession Convention at the state house in Milledgeville, January 21, 1861
- Created: c. January 20, 1861
- Ratified: January 19, 1861 (208 yeas, 89 nays); Signed January 21
- Date effective: January 22, 1861
- Location: Engrossed copy: University of Georgia Libraries, Hargrett Library
- Authors: George W. Crawford et al.; H. J. G. Williams (engrosser)
- Signatories: 293 delegates to The Georgia Secession Convention of 1861
- Purpose: Formally announcing Georgia's intent to secede from the Union.

Georgia formally seceded on January 22, 1861, after a vote of 208–89 by delegates to the Georgia Secession Convention in Milledgeville.

== Tennessee ==
In Tennessee, Governor Isham G. Harris pushed for a referendum on a sovereignty convention that could have led to secession. However, on February 9th 1861, voters rejected this proposal. After President Lincoln called for troops following the Attack on Fort Sumter, the secession debate reignited. Convinced Tennesseans now favored joining the Confederacy, Governor Harris pushed for another vote. On June 6, 1861, voters approved secession. Although Tennessee eventually seceded, East Tennessee remained a Unionist stronghold throughout the Civil War. Nonetheless, after the war ended in 1865, Tennessee in 1866 became the first former Confederate state to rejoin the Union. This began the Reconstruction era and launched a long, ongoing struggle to build a society where people of all races could fully enjoy their rights as citizens.

== Kentucky ==
Kentucky's state government never approved an act of secession. Kentucky was caught between joining the neighboring slave states and staying loyal to the Union. A month after the battle of Fort Sumter in April 1861, Governor Beriah Magoffin issued a proclamation declaring neutrality and urged Kentuckians to stay out of the conflict. While Magoffin didn't think slavery was a "moral, social, or political evil", he opposed secession for two reasons. First, he believed the country's divisions could be resolved through dialogue. Second, he feared Kentucky would be invaded if it joined the Confederacy.

When General Leonidas Polk and the Confederacy tried to force Kentucky to join the Confederate States, their attempt failed, which pushed the state's legislature to choose a side. After this failed attack, Kentucky's government asked the Union Army for help. By early 1862, most of Kentucky was under Union control. Although Kentucky stayed mostly under Union control after early 1862, despite declaring neutrality, there was a clear social divide over which side the people of Kentucky supported. With 125,000 supporting the Union and 35,000 supporting the Confederate army.

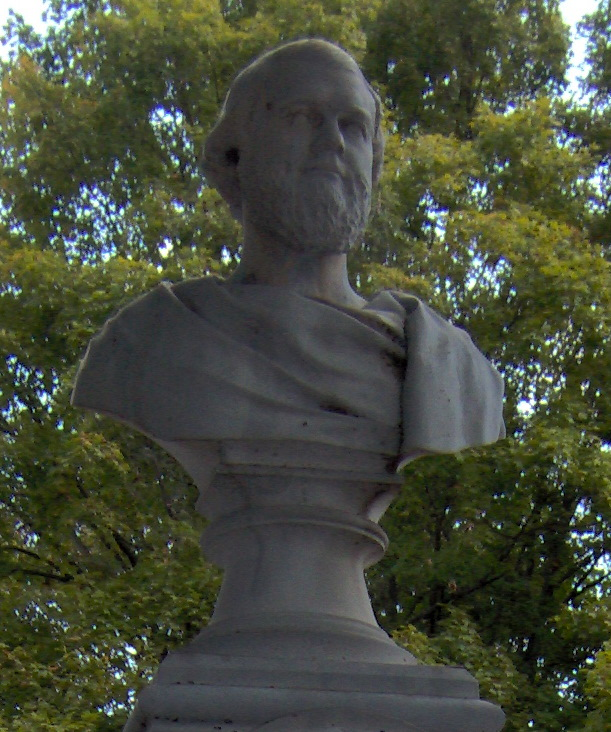
Bust of Kentucky Governor Beriah Magoffin at his gravesite

== See also ==
- List of signers of the Georgia Ordinance of Secession
- Provisional Constitution of the Confederate States
- Wheeling Convention - convened in 1861, initially with the aim of repealing Virginia's Ordinance of Secession, but instead ending in the formation of the Restored Government of Virginia and ultimately of the state of West Virginia
