= 1859 Kentucky gubernatorial election =

- August 1, 1859
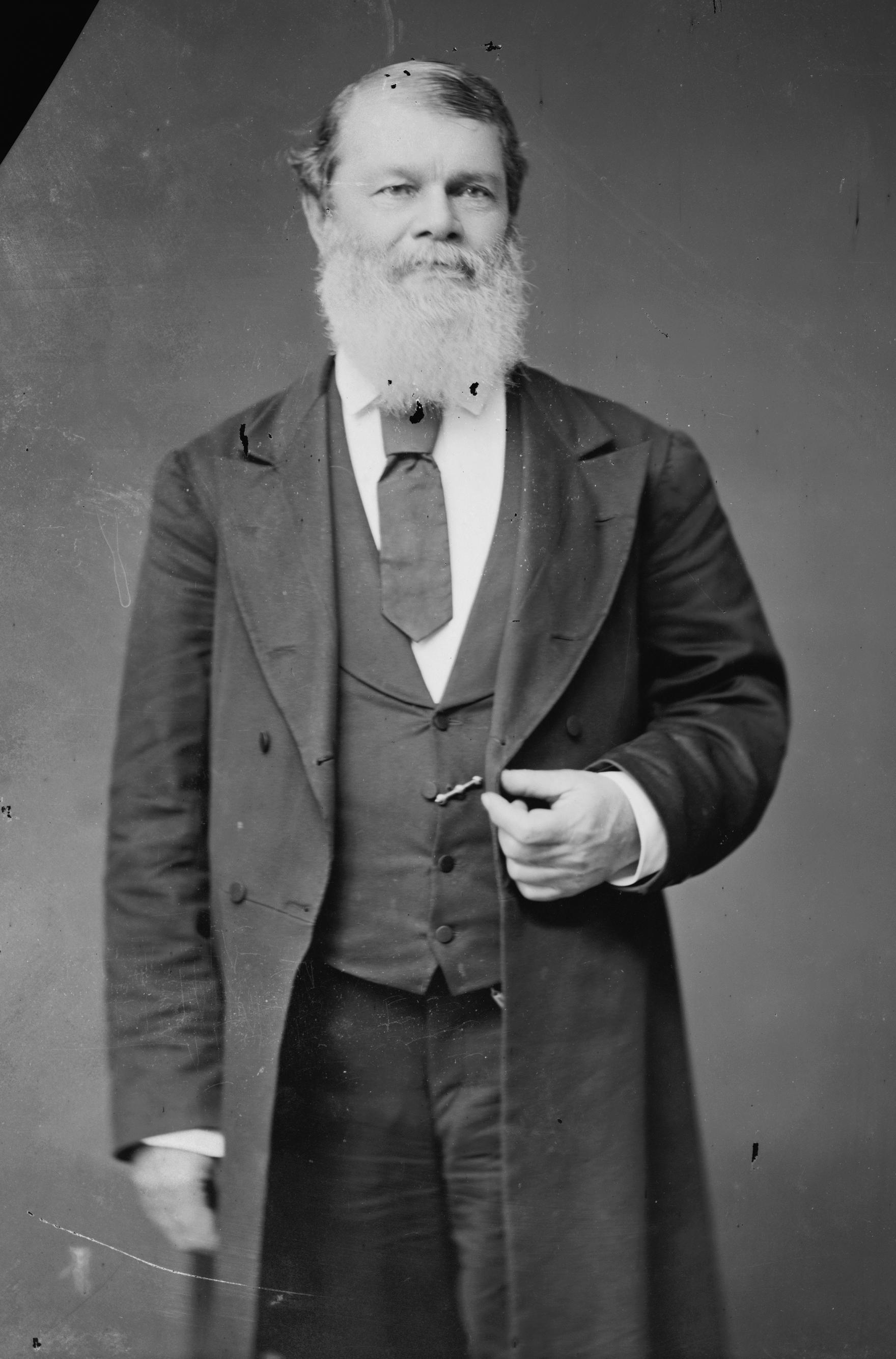

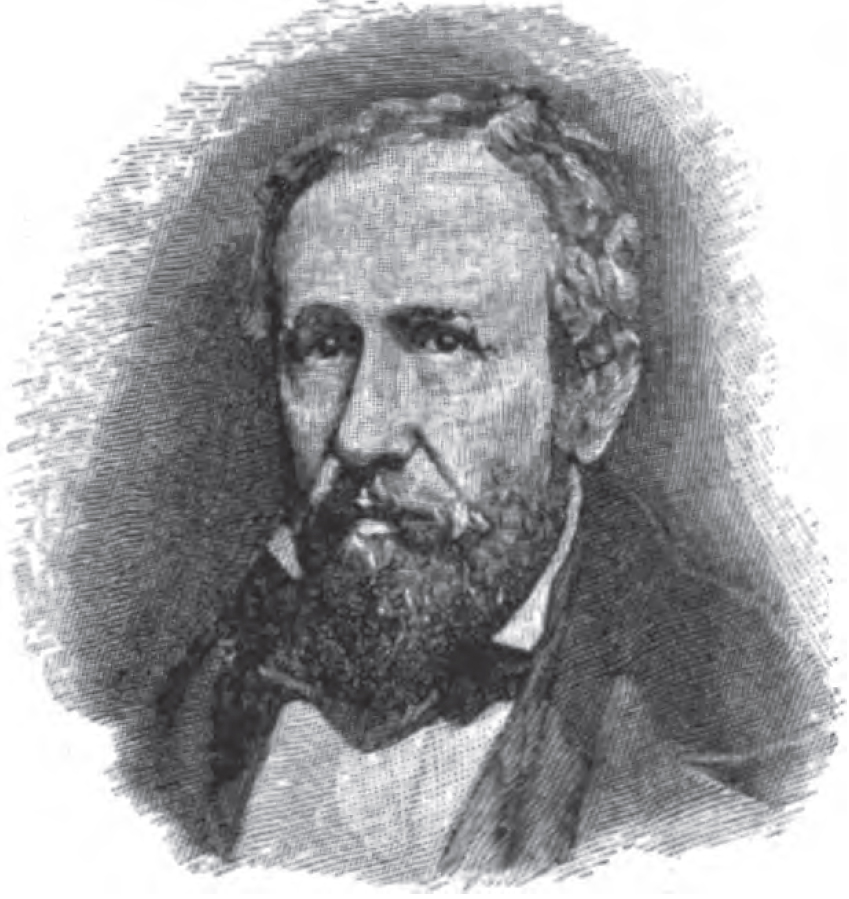
Nominee	Beriah Magoffin	Joshua Fry Bell
Party	Democratic	Opposition
Popular vote	76,187	67,283
Percentage	53.10%	46.90%
- Magoffin: 50–60% 60–70% 70–80% 80–90% >90% Bell: 50–60% 60–70% 70–80% 80-90% Tie: No data
Governor before election
Charles S. Morehead
Democratic
Elected Governor
Beriah Magoffin
Democratic

The 1859 Kentucky gubernatorial election was held on August 1, 1859. Democratic nominee Beriah Magoffin defeated Opposition Party candidate Joshua Fry Bell with 53.10% of the vote.

== General election ==
=== Candidates ===
- Beriah Magoffin, Democratic
- Joshua Fry Bell, Opposition Party

=== Results ===
1859 Kentucky gubernatorial election
Party	Candidate	Votes	%	±%
Democratic	Beriah Magoffin	76,187	53.10%	+4.73%
Opposition	Joshua Fry Bell	67,283	46.90%	−4.73%
