= Beriah Magoffin Monument =

- Magoffin, Beriah, Monument
- U.S. National Register of Historic Places
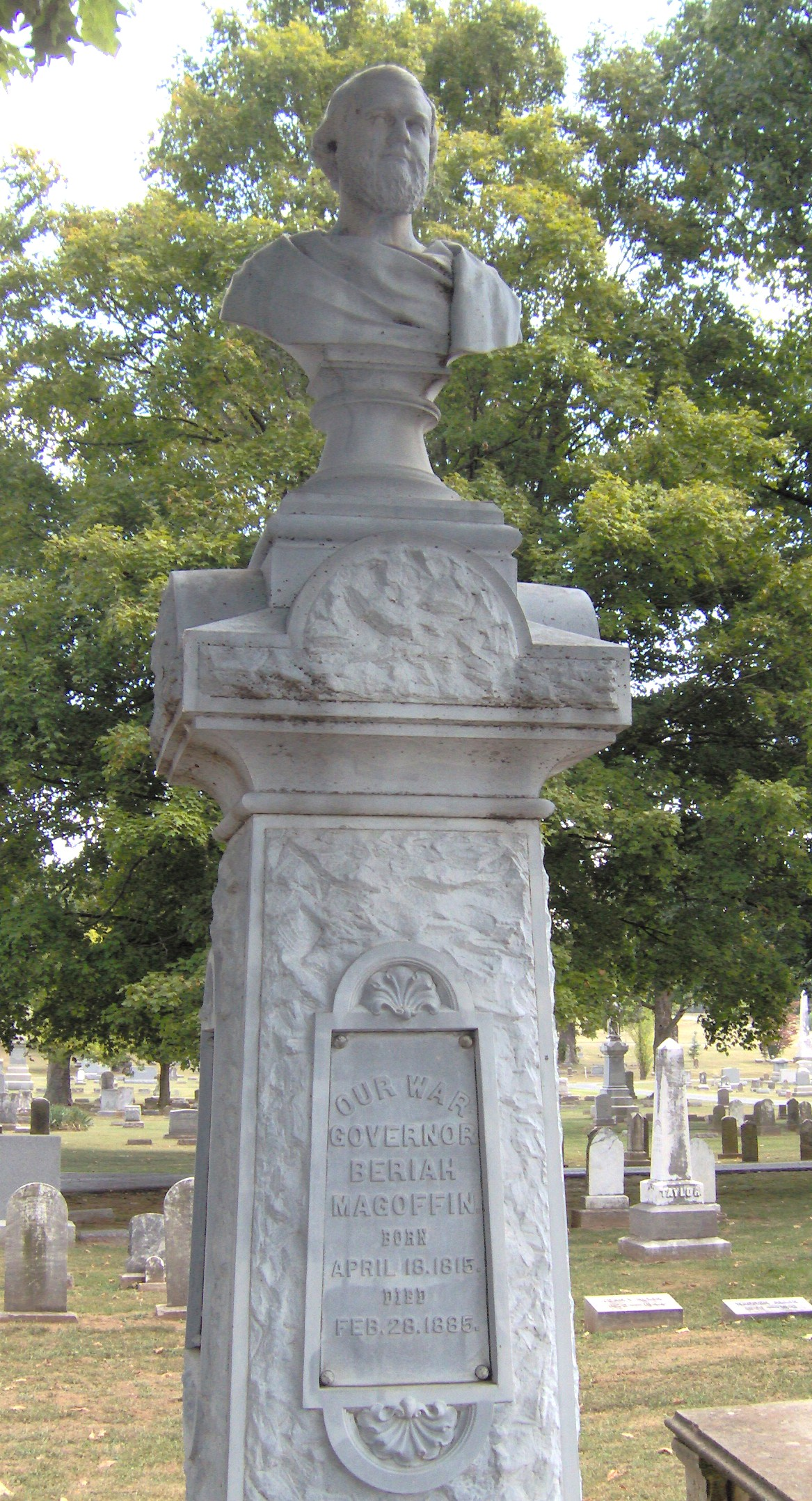

- Location within Kentucky Location within the United States
- Location: Harrodsburg, Kentucky
- Built: 1900
- Architect: American White Bronze
- MPS: Civil War Monuments of Kentucky MPS
- NRHP reference No.: 97000676
- Added to NRHP: July 17, 1997

The Beriah Magoffin Monument, in Spring Hill Cemetery of Harrodsburg, Kentucky, commemorates Beriah Magoffin, who was governor of Kentucky when the Civil War started. Although sympathetic to secession, he sought to retain neutrality for Kentucky for the conflict, until pro-Union forces compelled him to resign from the governorship.

== History ==
The Beriah Magoffin Monument was dedicated around 1900, many years after Magoffin's 1885 death. Its cast zinc and tribute to the "Lost Cause" is typical of monuments to the War built around 1900. However, atypically of such monuments, Magoffin's portrait bust draped in a toga recalls Neoclassical conventions, as in Houdon's sculptural portrait of George Washington; this parallel with a heroic Roman was intended by the builder of the Beriah Magoffin Monument.

Five quotes of Magoffin's were inscribed to reflect his position on Kentucky's role in the conflict:

"What attitude shall Kentucky occupy in this deplorable conflict. Looking to the Constitution of the United States, the nature of our institutions and the causes of this war, I think Kentucky has a right to assume a neutral position."

"Let her be a peacemaker and when opportunity offers, as a mediator, present terms of peace and of settlement, alike honorable to both the contending parties."

"While opposed to the policy of the government and the measures used to preserve the Constitution, we would not exchange the government of our fathers for any experiment on Earth."

"We differ only as to the best means of preserving the Union."

"May God yet preserve and bless and guide us by His wisdom in this dread hour."

Spring Hill Cemetery, where the monument lies, was established in 1860.

== National Register of Historic Places ==
On July 17, 1997, the Beriah Magoffin Monument was one of sixty different monuments related to the Civil War in Kentucky placed on the National Register of Historic Places, as part of the Civil War Monuments of Kentucky Multiple Property Submission. It is one of nine monuments in the MPS that is a tombstone. The Confederate Monument in Harrodsburg, also part of the same MPS, is within the same cemetery.
