= Orlando Brown (Kentucky politician) =

American writer and politician

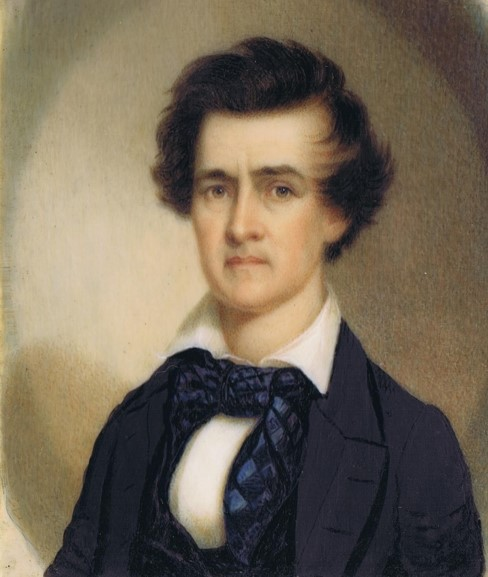
- portrait attributed to George Harrison Hite

30th Secretary of State of Kentucky
- In office 1848–1849
- Governor: John J. Crittenden
- Preceded by: William Decatur Reed
- Succeeded by: Joshua Fry Bell

5th Commissioner of Indian Affairs
- In office 1849 – July 1, 1850
- President: Zachary Taylor
- Preceded by: William Medill
- Succeeded by: Luke Lea

Personal details
- Born: September 26, 1801
- Died: July 6, 1867 (aged 65)
- Party: Whig
- Parents: John Brown (father); Margaretta Mason (mother)
- Relatives: Mason Brown (brother)

Orlando Brown (September 26, 1801 – July 26, 1867) was a Kentucky politician, newspaper publisher, and historian, who also held the office of Indian Commissioner during the Zachary Taylor administration. Brown was a Whig and an anti-secessionist. He was the son of John Brown, Kentucky's first member of Congress.

== Early life ==
Orlando Brown was born on September 26, 1801, in Frankfort, Kentucky, to John and Margaretta Brown. Orlando was their second child and younger brother of Mason. His family had moved into their home Liberty Hall that year, where he was raised. Orlando had three younger siblings, two of them dying in infancy, and his sister Euphemia dying at the age of seven. Orlando was described as a bright and charming child, and had a close relationship with his brother Mason. Orlando and Mason remained relatively healthy throughout their childhood, and were the only children of John and Margaretta Brown to survive to adulthood.

== Education ==
Brown's early education was primarily through private tutors in his home. His college preparation included being sent to school in Danville, Kentucky, under the teachings of Kean O'Hara. He left Frankfort to attend college in 1818. Brown enrolled as a junior at College of Princeton and graduated in 1820. After graduating, he pursued many studies. He began studying medicine with his uncle, Dr. Preston Brown, but disliked it and stopped his education in 1822. Shortly after, he joined his brother Mason's law office, and began studying law at Transylvania University, graduating with the class of 1822/1823.

== Career ==
Brown practiced law for a few years after graduating from Transylvania. He moved to Tuscumbia, Alabama for his practice around 1824, then moved back to Frankfort in 1829.

Upon his return to Frankfort, he took up writing for a local newspaper, The Frankfort Commonwealth. His dedication to the newspaper earned him the position as editor in 1833. He resigned in 1842, a few months after the death of his first wife, so he could take care of his young children.

Brown was also involved in politics, and held roles in Kentucky's government throughout his career. In 1839, he was appointed as First Aide to Kentucky Governor Charles Wickliffe, where he was granted the title of Colonel. Brown also served as the Secretary of State in 1848 under Governor J.J. Crittenden. During the Civil War, he served as Commissioner of the Board of Enrollment for the 7th district of Kentucky. He was considered for the Governor of the Iowa Territory in 1841, which he felt was a more noble pursuit than his role as editor in the newspaper.

Brown received his appointment as Commissioner of Indian Affairs based on his loyalty to the Taylor campaign, and used it to distribute further patronage appointments. He accepted the position on June 4, 1849. President Taylor and Brown had a close relationship during this period, and Brown was often regarded as the President's favorite. However, Brown faced challenges while in this position, ultimately leading to his resignation in 1850. Brown worked closely with Thomas Ewing, Secretary of the Department of the Interior, and did not get along with him. Additionally, a newspaper article was published in September 1849 that accused Brown of being incompetent and corrupt over transactions in his department. Although it was found that the matter was not in Brown's hands, the article, on top of his unhappiness with Ewing, determined his resignation. The resignation was accepted on June 28, 1850, just days before Taylor passed.

== Politics ==
Despite his slave ownership, Brown was pro-unionism and worked against secession. He served as the Commissioner of the Board of Enrollment for the 7th District of Kentucky until the war's end in 1865. He enlisted one of his slaves, Alexander Sanders, to fight for the union, as Brown thought he would receive compensation for it.

Brown was involved in Whig politics, and used his career to support its policies. In 1840, he released the first issue of The Campaign, which advocated for Whig politicians such as William Henry Harrison and John Tyler. A weekly issue was published from April- October of that year. The final issue was put out in May 1841, following the death of Harrison.

Brown believed that it was the moral obligation of white Americans to assist Native American tribes in creating their own civilizations. He wished for tribes to be relocated far west into reservations, and be provided with manual labor schools and skills to thrive in the new environment. During his short career as Commissioner of Indian Affairs, he was involved in a removal process that caused irreparable damage to the Lake Superior Ojibwe. In the fall of 1850, the Ojibwe were told to move from Wisconsin to Sandy Lake, Minnesota, where they would receive government assistance and payments. The payments were delayed, leading to 400 Ojibwe deaths, mainly from starvation and disease. Although Brown had left office by the time of the Ojibwe removal, the planning he was a part of broke several treaties and protections of Native Americans.

=== Personal life and death ===
In his early adulthood, Brown spent lots of time with his first cousin, Mary Watts Brown, for whom he had strong feelings. She told him that she did not love him, which inspired his move to Alabama. They eventually got married on July 29, 1830, and had four children together: Euphemia Brown, John Preston Brown (who died a few months after his birth), Mason Preston Brown, and Orlando Brown Jr. Mary Watts Brown died in 1841, and Orlando married Mary Cordelia Broadhead in 1852, but they had no children together.

Brown spent most of his later years working on a history of Kentucky governors, but his work was uncompleted when he died. He was diagnosed with consumption (tuberculosis) in 1858, which is thought to be his cause of death, although he would not die until July 26, 1867.

Political offices
Preceded by William Decatur Reed	Secretary of State of Kentucky; 1848–1849	Succeeded by Joshua Fry Bell
