= Beverly L. Clarke =

American politician

Beverly Clarke
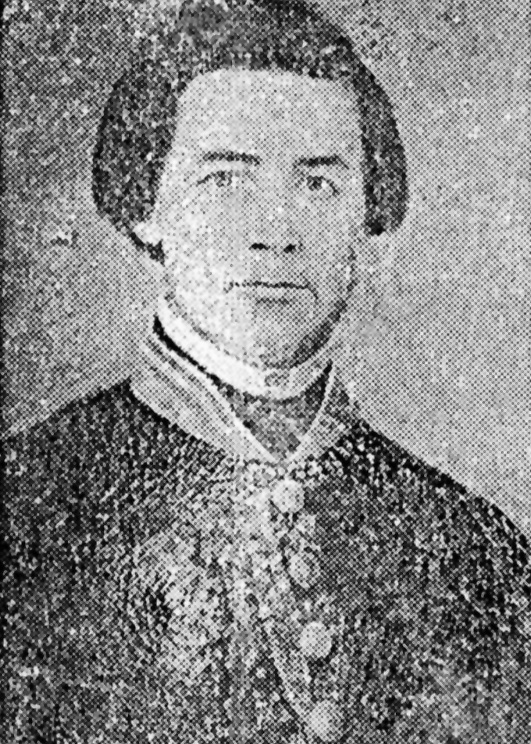

U.S. Minister to Guatemala
- In office July 13, 1858 – March 17, 1860
- President: James Buchanan
- Preceded by: John L. Marling
- Succeeded by: Elisha Oscar Crosby

U.S. Minister to Honduras
- In office August 10, 1858 – March 17, 1860
- President: James Buchanan
- Preceded by: Solon Borland
- Succeeded by: James R. Partridge

Member of the U.S. House of Representatives from Kentucky's 2nd district
- In office March 4, 1847 – March 3, 1849
- Preceded by: John H. McHenry
- Succeeded by: James Leeper Johnson

Personal details
- Born: Beverly Leonidas Clarke; February 11, 1809 Winterfield, Virginia, U.S.
- Died: March 17, 1860 (aged 51) Guatemala City, Guatemala
- Party: Democratic
- Spouses: Mariah Louisa Clarke (died 1848) Zenobia Turner (after 1848)
- Relations: John S. Mosby (son-in-law)
- Children: 5
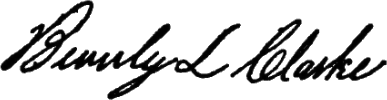
- Signature

Beverly Leonidas Clarke (February 11, 1809 – March 17, 1860) was a U.S. Representative from Kentucky. He was known for his "sterling integrity, gentlemanly manners, and polished oratory."

== Early life ==
Clarke was born in Winterfield, Chesterfield County, Virginia, on February 11, 1809. Winterfield was a 210-acre plantation near modern-day Midlothian that had a horse racetrack on it. In the 1870s it was subdivided into 65 lots. The current subdivisions of Winterfield Station (2004), Winterfield Park (2016), and Winterfield Crossing (2018) all possess the name of the old plantation and yet are not located on the land of it.

Clarke attended the common school and moved to Kentucky in 1823. He studied law in Franklin, Kentucky, and graduated from the Lexington Law School in 1831.

== Career ==
Clarke was admitted to the bar in 1833 and commenced practice in Franklin, Kentucky. He served as member of the Kentucky House of Representatives in 1841 and 1842.

Clarke was elected as a Democrat to the Thirtieth Congress (March 4, 1847 – March 3, 1849). He served as delegate to the State constitutional convention in 1849.

=== Race for Governor of Kentucky ===
In 1855, Clarke, who was known as an old-line conservative and proslavery candidate, was selected as the Democratic nominee for Governor of Kentucky. His opponent Charles S. Morehead, a former Whig U.S. Representative who ran with the Know-Nothing Party ran a campaign that focused on immigrants and vilified Catholics leading to bloody riots in Louisville. Although Clarke himself was not a Catholic, his wife was and that was used against him. Clarke had the support of John C. Breckinridge, who (successfully) ran to replace Morehead in the House of Representatives and would later serve as Vice-President of the United States from 1857 to 1861 under President Buchanan. Clarke was defeated by Morehead (69,816 for Morehead to 65,413 for Clarke) who served until 1859.

=== Diplomatic service ===
On January 7, 1858, he was appointed by President Buchanan as U.S. Minister to Guatemala. On January 14, 1858, he was also appointed as U.S. Minister to Honduras. He presented his credentials in Guatemala on July 13, 1858, and in Honduras on August 10, 1858, serving until his death in Guatemala on March 17, 1860. After moving to Guatemala, Clarke converted to Catholicism, confirmed by Bishop Bernardo Piñol with Pedro de Aycinena y Piñol as his godfather, much to the delight of the people there.

== Personal life ==
Clarke was married to his cousin Mariah Louise Clarke (1818 – c. 1848), a devout Roman Catholic. Together, they were the parents of one son and three daughters (all of whom they named after the Virgin Mary), including:

- George W. Clarke
- Mariah "Pauline" Clarke (1837–1876), who married John Singleton Mosby (1833–1916) on December 30, 1856 and moved to Brentmoor in Warrenton, Virginia. Mosby, a Confederate army cavalry battalion commander in the American Civil War, served as the American consul to Hong Kong and in the U.S. Department of Justice.
- Maria "Delia" Clarke
- Mary Clarke

After Mariah Louise Clark's death, he married Zenobia Turner. Together, they were the parents of a son:

- Thomas H. Clarke

Beverly Clarke died of diabetes in Guatemala City on March 17, 1860, while serving as the U.S. Minister. He was first buried in Guatemala but later was interred in the State Cemetery, Frankfort, Kentucky, after an act of the Kentucky Legislature.

=== Descendants ===
Through his daughter Pauline, he was the grandfather of nine grandchildren of whom six survived.

Party political offices
Preceded by Lazarus W. Powell	Democratic nominee for Governor of Kentucky; 1855	Succeeded by Beriah Magoffin
U.S. House of Representatives
Preceded by John H. McHenry	Member of the U.S. House of Representatives from Kentucky's 2nd congressional district March 4, 1847 – March 3, 1849	Succeeded by James Leeper Johnson
Diplomatic posts
Preceded by John L. Marling	United States Minister to Guatemala; July 13, 1858 – March 17, 1860	Succeeded by Elisha Oscar Crosby
Preceded by Solon Borland	United States Minister to Honduras; August 10, 1858 – March 17, 1860	Succeeded by James R. Partridge
