= James Leeper Johnson =

American politician (1818–1877)

Member of the U.S. House of Representatives from Kentucky's 2nd district
- In office March 4, 1849 – March 3, 1851
- Preceded by: Beverly L. Clarke
- Succeeded by: Benjamin E. Grey

Personal details
- Born: October 30, 1818 Smithland, Kentucky, U.S.
- Died: February 12, 1877 (aged 58) Owensboro, Kentucky, U.S.

James Leeper Johnson (October 30, 1818 – February 12, 1877) was an American lawyer and politician; he served as a U.S. representative from Kentucky.

== Biography ==
Born near Smithland, Kentucky, Johnson attended private schools. He moved to Owensboro, Kentucky, in 1836. He studied law. He was admitted to the bar in 1841 and commenced practice in Owensboro. He owned slaves. He served as a member of the Kentucky House of Representatives in 1844.

Johnson was elected as a Whig to the Thirty-first Congress (March 4, 1849 – March 3, 1851). He was nominated for reelection in 1850 but declined to accept. He resumed the practice of law in Owensboro and also engaged in agricultural pursuits. He was appointed judge of the Daviess County circuit court on May 4, 1867, and served until September 2 of that year. He died in Owensboro, Kentucky, on February 12, 1877. He was interred in Rosehill Elmwood Cemetery.

U.S. House of Representatives
Preceded by Beverly L. Clarke	Member of the U.S. House of Representatives from Kentucky's 2nd congressional district March 4, 1849 – March 3, 1851	Succeeded by Benjamin E. Grey
