= 1855 Kentucky gubernatorial election =

- August 6, 1855
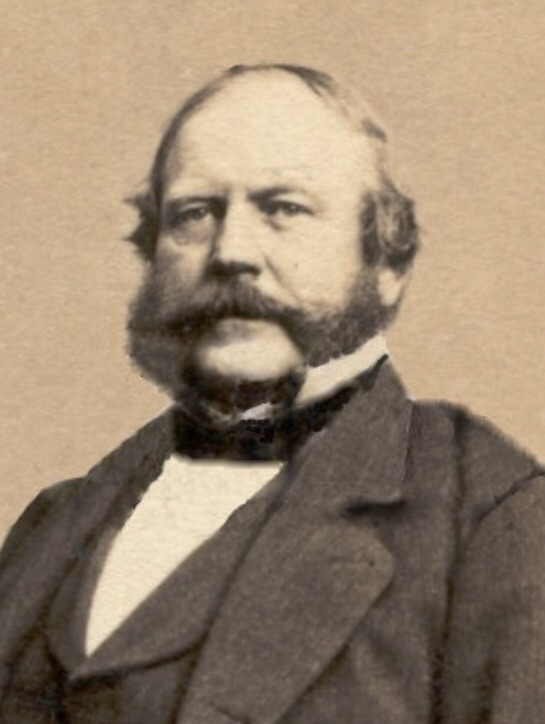

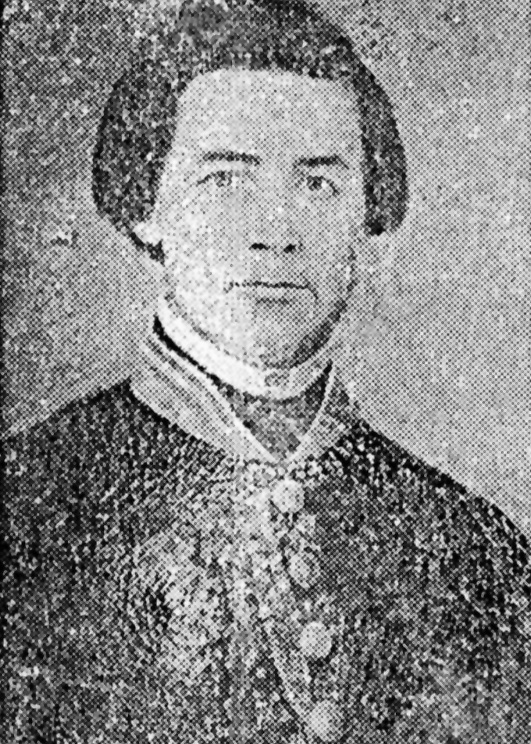
Nominee	Charles S. Morehead	Beverly L. Clarke
Party	Know Nothing	Democratic
Alliance	Whig
Popular vote	69,816	65,413
Percentage	51.63%	48.37%
- Morehead: 50–60% 60–70% 70–80% Clarke: 50–60% 60–70% 70–80% 80–90%
Governor before election
Lazarus W. Powell
Democratic
Elected Governor
Charles S. Morehead
Know Nothing

The 1855 Kentucky gubernatorial election was held on August 6, 1855. Know Nothing Charles S. Morehead defeated Democratic nominee Beverly L. Clarke with 51.63% of the vote.

== General election ==
=== Candidates ===
- Charles S. Morehead, Know Nothing
- Beverly L. Clarke, Democratic

=== Results ===
1855 Kentucky gubernatorial election
Party	Candidate	Votes	%	±%
Know Nothing	Charles S. Morehead	69,816	51.63%	
Democratic	Beverly L. Clarke	65,413	48.37%	
