= Joshua Fry Bell =

American politician (1811–1870)

Joshua F. Bell
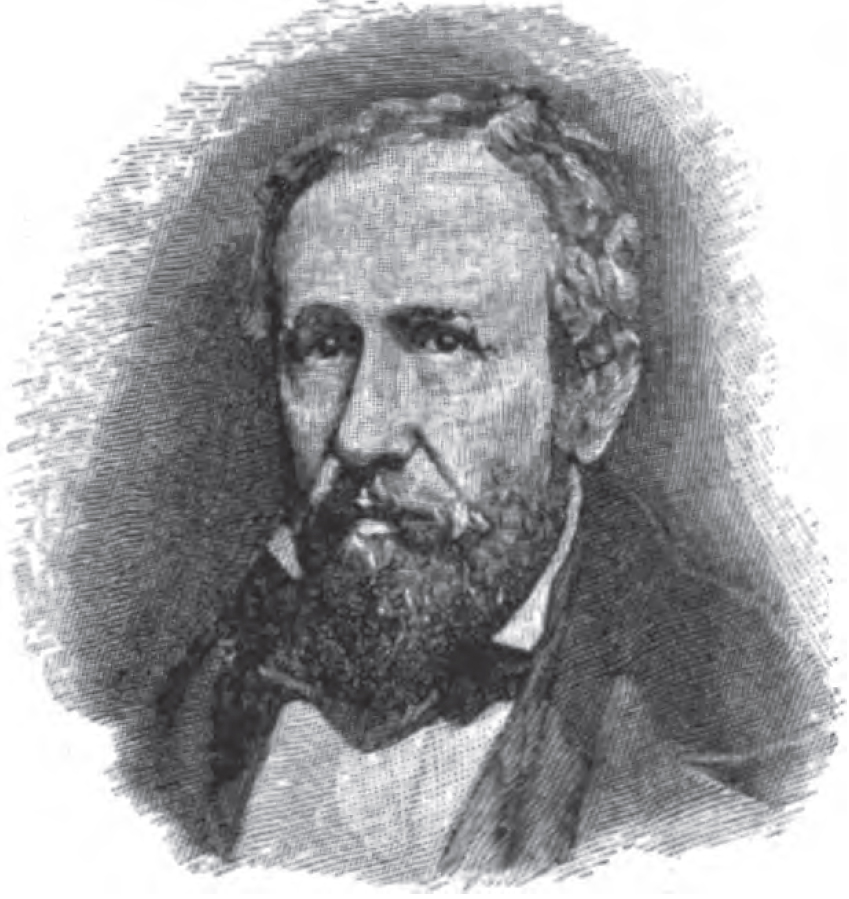

Member of the U.S. House of Representatives from Kentucky's 4th district
- In office March 4, 1845 – March 3, 1847
- Preceded by: George Caldwell
- Succeeded by: Aylette Buckner

31st Secretary of State of Kentucky
- In office July 2, 1849 – March 16, 1850
- Governor: John J. Crittenden
- Preceded by: Orlando Brown
- Succeeded by: John William Finnell

Member of the Kentucky House of Representatives from Boyle County
- In office February 17, 1862 – August 5, 1867
- Preceded by: William Clayton Anderson
- Succeeded by: James M. McFerran

Personal details
- Born: November 26, 1811 Danville, Kentucky
- Died: August 17, 1870 (aged 58) Danville, Kentucky
- Resting place: Bellevue Cemetery; Danville, Kentucky, U.S.
- Party: Whig
- Education: Centre College
- Profession: Lawyer

Joshua Fry Bell (November 26, 1811 – August 17, 1870) was an American politician. He represented Kentucky in the U.S. Congress for one term.

== Early life and education ==
Bell was born in Danville, Kentucky, where he attended public schools and then Centre College, where he graduated in 1828. He next studied law in Lexington, Kentucky, and travelled around Europe for several years before returning home and being admitted to the bar.

== Political career and mid-life ==
Bell was elected as a Whig to the 29th Congress in November 1844. He did not seek reelection and served a single term in the House, March 4, 1845 – March 4, 1847. He was the Kentucky Secretary of State in 1849.

Bell owned four slaves as of the 1850 census, and 14 as of the 1860 census.

Bell was the Whig Party nominee in the 1859 Kentucky gubernatorial election. He would lose to Democrat Beriah Magoffin, winning 46.9% of the vote.

In February 1861 he was sent by Kentucky as a commissioner to the Peace Conference held in Washington, D.C., in an unsuccessful last-ditch effort to stave off what became the American Civil War.

Bell served in the Kentucky House of Representatives from 1862 to 1867. Union Democrats attempted to nominate him for Governor of Kentucky in 1863, but he declined the nomination.

== Later life and death ==
Joshua Fry Bell died in 1870 in Danville at the age of 58 and was interred at Bellevue Cemetery. Bell County, Kentucky is named in his honor.

Party political offices
First	Opposition nominee for Governor of Kentucky; 1859	Succeeded by None
Preceded by George Caldwell	United States Representative (4th district) from Kentucky; 1845-1847	Succeeded by Aylette Buckner
Political offices
Preceded by Orlando Brown	Secretary of State of Kentucky; 1849–1850	Succeeded by John W. Finnell
