= Confederate Monument in Harrodsburg =

- U.S. National Register of Historic Places
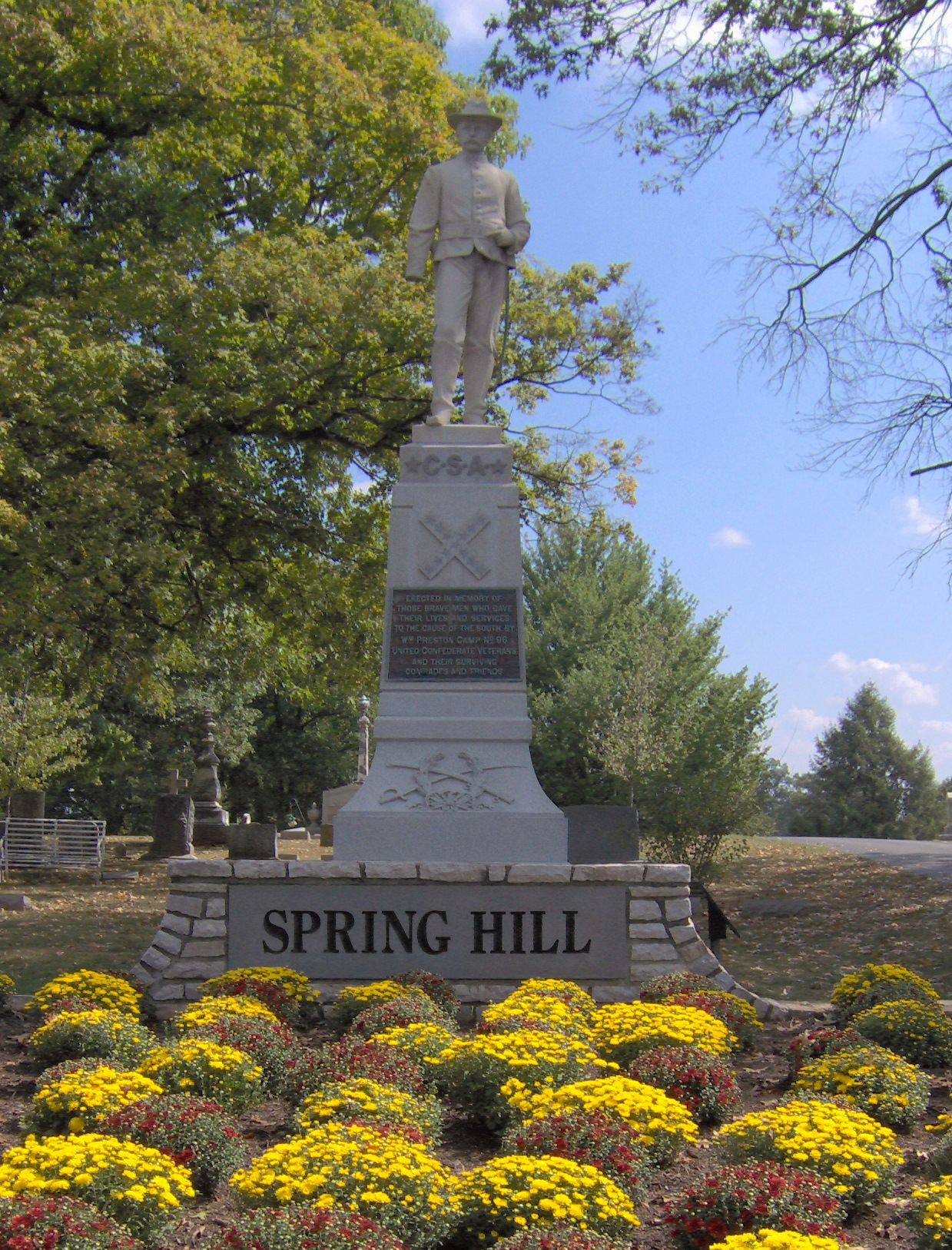

- Location within Kentucky Location within the United States
- Location: Harrodsburg, Kentucky
- Built: 1902
- MPS: Civil War Monuments of Kentucky MPS
- NRHP reference No.: 97000677
- Added to NRHP: July 17, 1997

The Confederate Monument in Harrodsburg, located at the entrance to Spring Hill Cemetery in Harrodsburg, Kentucky, is a statue listed on the National Register of Historic Places. It depicts a life-sized older Confederate cavalryman standing ready.

The monument depicts Captain Gabe S. Alexander, who served in John Hunt Morgan's 2nd Kentucky Cavalry. The pedestal has an engraved Southern Cross of Saint Andrew, commonly called the Confederate battle flag, on its front. Below the cross lies the dedication plaque, and below that an engraved wreath encircling a sword and scabbard. On the rear is an engrave Second Confederate Flag in the midst of cannonballs and battle smoke. Also on the rear is a verse from the Bivouac of the Dead, written by Kentuckian Theodore O'Hara, which six other monuments in Kentucky also have a verse from. When dedicated in 1902 by the United Confederate Veterans, speeches were made in favor of the Confederate cause and condemning revisionist history that defamed the Southern experience in the Civil War.

The verse from The Bivouac of the Dead is:

To fight in a just cause and for our country's glory, is the best office of the best of men.

Harrodsburg once saw Morgan's forces enter the town during the war. Instead of conflict, the town's ladies laid out a gigantic picnic on their lawns for the men, who had just raided through Glasgow, Lebanon, and Springfield. The only other action Harrodsburg saw during the War was when Braxton Bragg had his men withdraw from the Battle of Perryville through the town.

Harrodsburg was also home of the 19th Regiment Kentucky Volunteer Infantry. An infantry regiment that served in the Union Army during the American Civil War.

On July 17, 1997, the Confederate Monument in Harrodsburg was one of sixty different monuments related to the Civil War in Kentucky placed on the National Register of Historic Places, as part of the Civil War Monuments of Kentucky Multiple Property Submission. Harrodsburg's is one of 23 that were statues, of which eight were erected in cemeteries. The Beriah Magoffin Monument, within Spring Hill Cemetery as well, is also part of the Civil War Monuments of Kentucky MPS.
