= Charles S. Morehead =

US politician, 20th governor of Kentucky

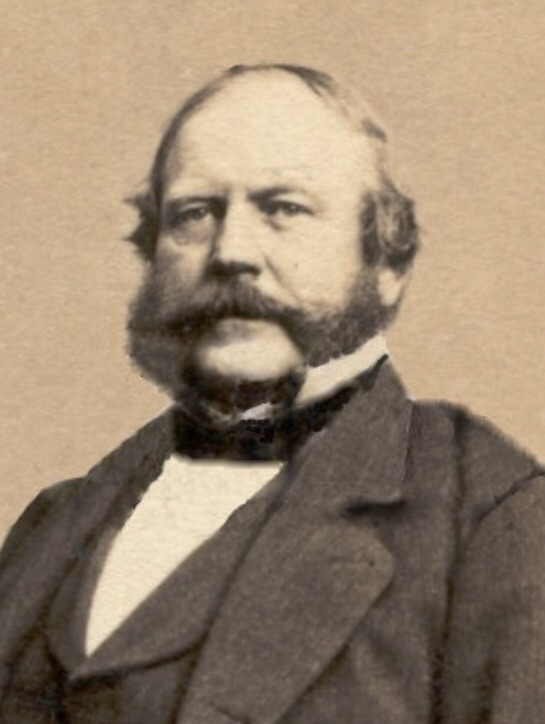

20th Governor of Kentucky
- In office September 4, 1855 – August 30, 1859
- Lieutenant: James G. Hardy
- Preceded by: Lazarus W. Powell
- Succeeded by: Beriah Magoffin

Member of the U.S. House of Representatives from Kentucky's 8th district
- In office March 4, 1847 – March 3, 1851
- Preceded by: Garrett Davis
- Succeeded by: John C. Breckinridge

Attorney General of Kentucky
- In office 1832–1838
- Governor: John Breathitt; James T. Morehead; James Clark
- Preceded by: James W. Denny
- Succeeded by: Owen G. Cotes

Member of the Kentucky House of Representatives
- In office 1838–1842; 1844

Personal details
- Born: Charles Slaughter Morehead; July 7, 1802 Nelson County, Kentucky, US
- Died: December 21, 1868 (aged 66) Greenville, Mississippi, US
- Resting place: Frankfort Cemetery
- Party: Whig; Know Nothing
- Relations: Cousin of James Turner Morehead
- Education: Transylvania University
- Occupation: Farmer
- Profession: Lawyer

Charles Slaughter Morehead (July 7, 1802 – December 21, 1868) was a U.S. representative from Kentucky, and served as the 20th governor of Kentucky. Though a member of the Whig Party for most of his political service, he joined the Know Nothing, or American, Party in 1855, and was the only governor of Kentucky ever elected from that party.

Morehead's political service began in the Kentucky House of Representatives in 1828. In 1832, he was appointed state attorney general. He served in this capacity for five years, and later returned to the Kentucky House, where he was chosen Speaker of the House three times. He was elected to Congress in 1848 and served two terms. After his congressional tenure, he joined the Know Nothing Party and was chosen as the party's candidate for governor in 1855. The campaign was marred by anti-immigrant and anti-Catholic rhetoric that touched off the "Bloody Monday" riots in Louisville.

Morehead was a delegate to the Peace Conference of 1861 and the Border States Convention that attempted to stave off the Civil War. Although he favored Kentucky's neutrality, Morehead sympathized with the South and was an open critic of the Lincoln administration. He was imprisoned for disloyalty in September 1861, although no formal charges were ever brought against him. He was released from prison in January 1862, and afterward fled to Canada, Europe, and Mexico. After the war, he returned to the United States and settled on his plantation in Greenville, Mississippi, where he died on December 21, 1868.

== Early life ==
Charles Slaughter Morehead was born near Bardstown, Kentucky, on July 7, 1802. He was the son of Charles and Margaret (Slaughter) Morehead and a first cousin to Kentucky's twelfth governor, James Turner Morehead. His father served in both houses of the Kentucky General Assembly.

Morehead was educated in the area's public schools, then matriculated to Transylvania University. He earned a bachelor's degree in 1820, graduating with honors. After graduation, he became a tutor at the university and earned a Bachelor of Laws degree in 1822. He relocated to Christian County, Kentucky, was admitted to the bar, and commenced practice in Hopkinsville. He also worked as a farmer, and owned plantations in Mississippi and Louisiana.

Morehead married Amanda Leavy on July 10, 1823. She died July 5, 1829, at the age of twenty-five. Following her death, Morehead married Margaret Leavy, his first wife's sister, on September 6, 1831. Together they had four children. Charles and Margaret were very fond of music, theater, dances, and parties.

== Political career ==
Morehead was elected as a Whig to the Kentucky House of Representatives in 1828 and was re-elected in 1829. Following his second term in the legislature, he moved to Frankfort, Kentucky, believing it provided better opportunities for his legal practice. He was appointed as state attorney general in 1832 and served for five years. In 1834, he co-authored A Digest of the Statute Laws of Kentucky with Mason Brown. He represented Franklin County in the state house from 1838 to 1842 and again in 1844; he was chosen Speaker of the House in 1840, 1841, and 1844.

Morehead was elected the Thirtieth and Thirty-first Congresses, serving from March 4, 1847, until March 3, 1851. During the Thirty-first Congress, the Whig caucus considered him as a candidate for Speaker of the House. The voting for speaker began December 3, 1849. The caucus first chose Robert C. Winthrop as their candidate, but after several ballots, Winthrop was still unable to obtain a majority because of sectional rivalries within the caucus. Some Whigs from northern states voted for David Wilmot, a Free Soiler, while five southern Whigs steadfastly voted for Meredith Gentry. The Democrats were similarly unable to muster a majority for their candidate, Howell Cobb.

At their caucus meeting on the night of December 10, the Whigs agreed to continue voting for Winthrop for one more day, and if he was not elected, to switch their support to Morehead, who they believed could hold all of Winthrop's votes and win the votes of the southern Whigs as well as some southern Democrats. They made their intentions known on December 11, and by the end of the day, Morehead reported that he had received commitments of support from twenty southern Democrats. During the day's voting, the five southern Whigs shifted their support from Gentry to Morehead. This shift cost Morehead the support of many northern Whigs who, at the caucus meeting the night of December 11, declared that Morehead's election "would ruin the Whig party in the North", especially if he gained the support of southern Democrats. Rather than further fracture the caucus, Morehead withdrew his name from consideration. Cobb was finally elected on the sixty-third ballot on December 22.

=== Governor of Kentucky ===
Following his congressional tenure, Morehead resumed his law practice and management of his plantations. In 1852, he was a presidential elector for Winfield Scott, and in 1853, he served another term in the Kentucky House. By early 1855, sectional divisions had ripped apart the national Whig Party. In Kentucky, many former Whigs associated with the Know Nothing Party. Morehead was among these; he claimed that the Know Nothing Party was more "Union" than the Democratic Party. The ex-Whigs hoped to take over the Know Nothing Party and reshape it into a Unionist Whig organization. Accordingly, when the Know Nothing candidate for governor, Judge William Loving, withdrew from the race due to failing health, the influx of ex-Whigs nominated Morehead to replace him for the gubernatorial election of 1855. Prior to the dissolution of the party, most had expected the Whigs would nominate Morehead at their own party's convention in April.

Though Kentucky had only a small population of immigrants and Catholics, much of Morehead's campaign oratory was directed against these groups. Most of the state's immigrant and Catholic population resided in Louisville, and tensions there reached a climax with an anti-foreign riot known as "Bloody Monday" on August 6, 1855. Morehead won the election with 69,816 votes to 65,413 votes for Democrat Beverly L. Clarke. In his inaugural address, Morehead denounced the nullification of the Fugitive Slave Act and despite his campaign rhetoric, proclaimed "perfect equality" for naturalized citizens.

Morehead's term as governor was an active one. He approved the appropriation of funding for the first Kentucky State Fair, which was seen as a vehicle for encouraging improvements in agriculture. He also approved the formation of the Kentucky State Agricultural Society in 1856. The state geological survey begun under Governor Lazarus W. Powell was completed and published. Internal improvements progressed as well; railroad mileage in the state increased from 242 miles to 568 miles during Morehead's term.

Kentucky's school system was expanding rapidly, creating a shortage of qualified teachers in the state; Morehead responded to this need by proposing a bill for state-supported teacher education program at Transylvania University. The state's superintendent, John D. Matthews, lobbied for the bill, claiming that a failure to educate teachers in Kentucky would result in Northern teachers infiltrating the state and corrupting children's minds. The bill passed in 1856, and Transylvania University made the transition from a private institution to a state-supported university. Money raised through school taxes, previously regarded as revenue by the legislature, was diverted to support of Transylvania. Although the teacher education program enrolled seventy-five students, opposition to the plan developed soon after its passage. Many citizens felt that public school money should not be used to support higher education. Governor Morehead defended the plan, but when the legislature convened two years later, it revoked the university's funding.

The number of prisoners housed in the state penitentiary at Frankfort was also increasing. By 1856, 237 prisoners were detained in the facility which had only 126 cells. Though state law required solitary confinement at night, the statute was impossible to administer due to the space constraints. Morehead cooperated with the legislature and developed a plan to expand the penitentiary to 252 cells. He also renegotiated the state's contract with the warden that was more favorable to the state, and allowed the warden to collect income from convict labor.

Early in his term, Morehead approved two new bank charters, but he later vetoed several others, beginning with the proposed Bank of Harrodsburg. Many other proposed bank charters died in the General Assembly. The later years of Morehead's administration were hindered by the financial Panic of 1857. In December 1857, he reported state expenditures of $21,000 for relief of the poor.

== Civil War and later life ==
Morehead moved to Louisville in 1859 and formed a law partnership with his nephew, Charles M. Briggs. In February 1861, he attended the Peace Conference of 1861 that tried to resolve the sectional differences between the states. In May 1861, he was chosen as a delegate to the Border State Convention, an ultimately futile attempt to avert the Civil War. Morehead refused to sign the final document produced by the convention because he did not agree with all the statements it contained. He was an advocate of Kentucky's position of neutrality, but was personally sympathetic to the South and was an outspoken critic of the Lincoln administration. He condemned Secretary of State William H. Seward for cutting off trade with the South.

On September 19, 1861, Morehead, Louisville Courier editor Reuben T. Durrett, and a man named Martin W. Barr were arrested for disloyalty. The three were taken to Indianapolis, Indiana, and the next day, Louisville circuit court judge John Catron issued a writ of habeas corpus for Morehead. On September 24, the officer who had arrested Morehead told Catron that Secretary of War Simon Cameron had already ordered Morehead taken to Fort Lafayette in New York Harbor. Shortly after this, a grand jury was convened but failed to return any charges against Morehead.

Morehead was later transferred to Fort Warren in Boston Harbor. He complained to his captors about the conditions in the prison; specifically, the difficulty of writing letters when confined with nine other men in a room that measured just ten feet by twenty feet. Petitions for Morehead's release were delivered to President Lincoln, but Lincoln told Secretary of State Seward that Morehead and those arrested with them would be released "when James Guthrie and James Speed [friends of Lincoln's in Kentucky] think they should be". Later, Guthrie told Lincoln that Morehead's arrest had "not been beneficial" to their cause in Kentucky. Morehead was paroled on January 6, 1862, on the condition that he swear an oath not to take part in the Confederate insurgence. On March 19, 1862, he was unconditionally discharged from his parole.

Morehead returned to his home in Louisville, but feared his refusal to take an oath of allegiance to the Constitution would lead to another arrest. In June 1862, he fled to Canada, then to Europe, and finally to Mexico. Following the war, Morehead returned to the United States and lived on his plantation in Greenville, Mississippi. He died there on December 21, 1868, and was buried on the grounds. On May 31, 1879, he was reburied in the Frankfort Cemetery in Frankfort, Kentucky.

Party political offices
First	Know Nothing nominee for Governor of Kentucky; 1855	Succeeded by None
Legal offices
Preceded by James W. Denny	Attorney General of Kentucky; 1832–1838	Succeeded by Owen G. Cotes
U.S. House of Representatives
Preceded by Garrett Davis	Member of the U.S. House of Representatives from Kentucky's 8th congressional district 1847 – 1851	Succeeded by John C. Breckinridge
Political offices
Preceded by Lazarus W. Powell	Governor of Kentucky; 1855–1859	Succeeded by Beriah Magoffin
