= Ebenezer Magoffin =

Colonel Ebenezer Magoffin
- Born: 1817; Mercer County, Kentucky, US
- Died: 1865 (aged 47–48)
- Relatives: Beriah Magoffin (brother)

Ebenezer "Ben" Magoffin (1817–1865) was a Confederate officer in the American Civil War who carried a Missouri State Guard's colonel's commission and became a prominent figure in the early phase of the war in Missouri. He was sentenced to death by a Union Army military commission in 1862, but was spared execution after Kentucky Governor Beriah Magoffin pleaded for the life of his brother with Abraham Lincoln.

== Early life ==
Ebenezer Magoffin was born in Harrodsburg, Kentucky to Beriah Magoffin, Sr., and Jane (McAfee) Magoffin. Among his siblings were a Kentucky governor Beriah Magoffin and James Wiley Magoffin, a U.S. consul in Mexico. On July 12, 1836, he married Margaret Ann Hutchison and they had nine children. Around 1856, he relocated his family to Boone County, Missouri and then purchased 2,160 acres in Pettis County, Missouri for $16,000 naming the new farm, Prairie Lea.

== Civil War ==
In May 1861, Ebenezer Magoffin presented himself to Missouri Governor Claiborne F. Jackson and received an instruction to raise a regiment of cavalry for the Missouri State Guard. The regiment took part in the Battle of Boonville under the command of Major Thomas E. Staples while Magoffin stayed at his farm; he joined his regiment in the Battle of Carthage where he acted as an aide to Governor Jackson. Magoffin raised another regiment for General Price on Jackson's request, of which he was elected a colonel. The regiment at three companies strength was mustered in at Prairie Lea and left under the command of Col. Edwin Williamson Price, the eldest son of General Price.

On August 29, 1861, he was apprehended in Georgetown, Pettis County, Missouri by Col. Henry M. Day of the First Illinois Cavalry, after a shootout that took life of Sergeant George W. Glasgow, 1st Illinois Cavalry, and placed under arrest in Lexington. After the Battle of Lexington Magoffin was exchanged for former Missouri Governor Austin A. King and stayed with Gen. Price's army. In December 1861, he asked for and received a 10-day pass from Col. Frederick Steele, Union Army of the West to see his wife who was dying; Union military authorities assumed that Magoffin asked for and was paroled. On his return from Prairie Lea, Magoffin was taken prisoner with his two sons, Elijah H. Magoffin, 24 years old, and Beriah Magoffin, 19 years old, at Milford, Johnson County, Missouri, while traveling with a detachment of Confederate troops under Col. F. S. Robertson.

On orders of Union General Henry W. Halleck, commanding the Department of Missouri, Ebenezer Magoffin was brought to St. Louis and charged with the murder of Sergeant Glasgow in Georgetown in August 1861 and violation of his alleged parole after rejoining the Confederates.

== Escape from prison ==
Magoffin was sentenced to death on February 20, 1862, by a military commission under General David S. Stanley, which absolved him of the murder charges but found guilty of violating his parole. His brother, the Governor of Kentucky at the time, sent a letter to President Lincoln asking for clemency. Lincoln suspended the sentence pending review but Magoffin escaped Alton Prison, where he had been confined, on July 25, 1862. Magoffin's sons, Elijah H. Magoffin and Beriah Magoffin were instrumental in digging in twenty days the 60-foot-long tunnel leading to freedom; altogether, 36 Confederate prisoners escaped.

== Later life ==
The Magoffins went to Arkansas where they served under General Shelby. Elijah Magoffin was promoted to Lieutenant-Colonel in July 1864.

According to reports, Ebenezer Magoffin was stabbed to death in 1865 while trying to break up a tavern fight. Elijah Magoffin traced the killer from Arkansas to Texas and hanged him to avenge his father's death.

== See also ==
- List of prisoner-of-war escapes
