= Beriah Magoffin =

American politician (1815–1885)

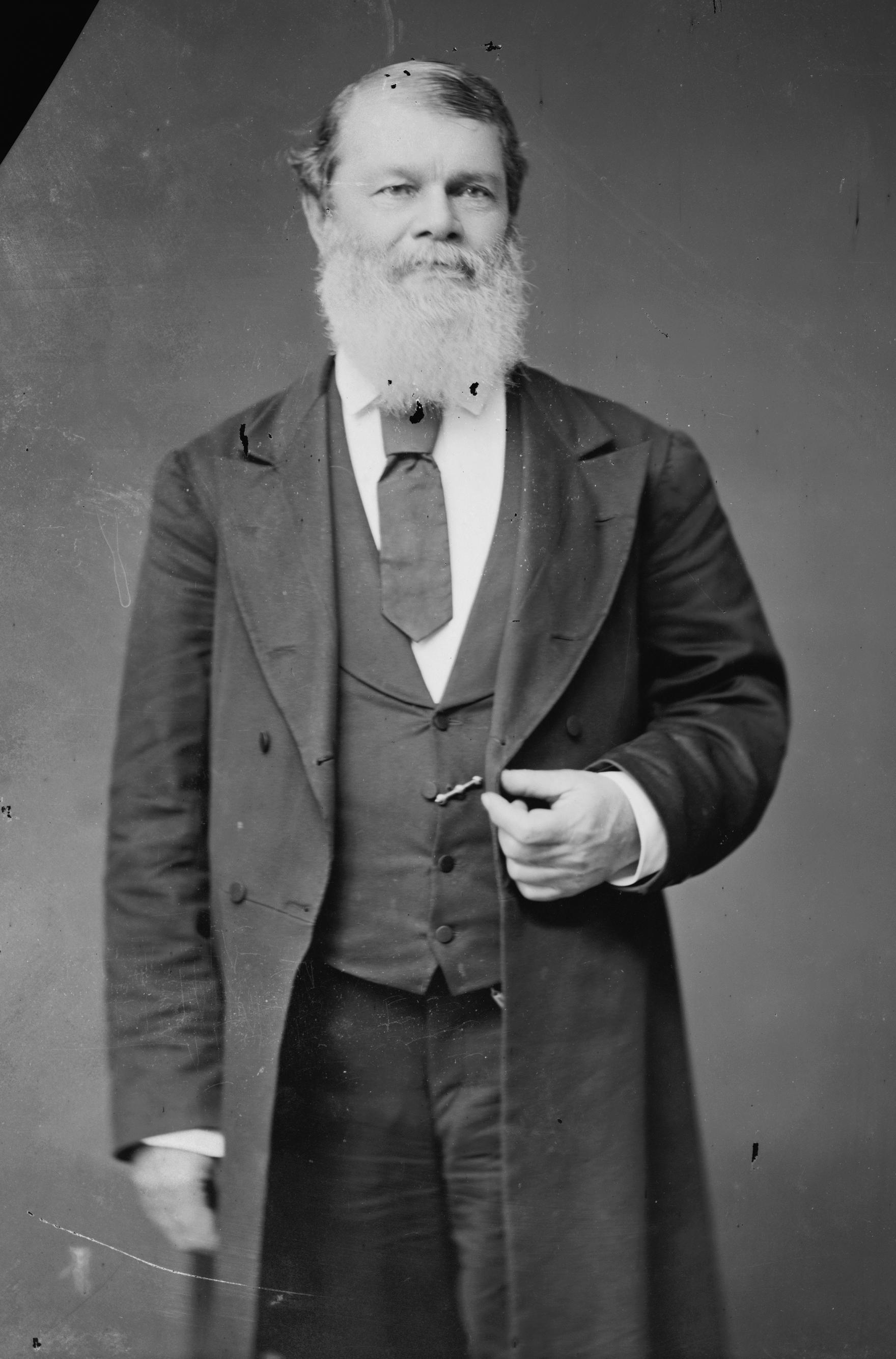

21st Governor of Kentucky
- In office August 30, 1859 – August 18, 1862
- Lieutenant: Linn Boyd; Vacant
- Preceded by: Charles S. Morehead
- Succeeded by: James F. Robinson

Member of the Kentucky House of Representatives from Mercer County
- In office August 5, 1867 – August 2, 1869
- Preceded by: William G. Connor
- Succeeded by: J. J. McAfee

Member of the Kentucky Senate
- In office 1850

Personal details
- Born: April 18, 1815 Harrodsburg, Kentucky
- Died: February 28, 1885 (aged 69) Harrodsburg, Kentucky
- Resting place: Spring Hill Cemetery
- Party: Democratic
- Relations: Ebenezer Magoffin (brother)
- Education: Centre College; Transylvania University
- Profession: Lawyer

Beriah Magoffin (April 18, 1815 – February 28, 1885) was the 21st governor of Kentucky, serving during the early part of the Civil War. Personally, Magoffin supported slavery, believed in the right of a state to secede from the Union, and sympathized with the Confederacy. Nevertheless, when the Kentucky General Assembly adopted a position of neutrality in the war, Magoffin ardently held to it, refusing calls for aid from both the Union and Confederate governments.

In special elections held in June 1861, Unionists captured nine of Kentucky's ten congressional seats and obtained two-thirds majorities in both houses of the state legislature. Despite Magoffin's strict adherence to the policy of neutrality, the Unionist legislature did not trust him and routinely overrode his vetoes. Unable to provide effective leadership due to a hostile legislature, Magoffin agreed to resign as governor in 1862, provided he could choose his successor. Lieutenant governor Linn Boyd had died in office, and Magoffin refused to allow Speaker of the Senate John F. Fisk to succeed him as governor. Accordingly, Fisk resigned and the Kentucky Senate elected Magoffin's choice, James F. Robinson, as speaker. Magoffin then resigned, Robinson ascended to the governorship, and Fisk was re-elected as Speaker of the Senate.

After the war, he encouraged acceptance of the Union victory and passage of the Thirteenth Amendment. He died February 28, 1885. Magoffin County, Kentucky, was named in his honor.

== Early life ==
Beriah Magoffin was born on April 18, 1815, in Harrodsburg, Kentucky. He was the son of Beriah and Jane (McAfee) Magoffin. His father was an immigrant from County Down, Ireland, and his mother was the daughter of Samuel McAfee, a prominent pioneer in early Kentucky.

Magoffin's early education was obtained in the common schools of Harrodsburg. In 1835, he graduated from Centre College in Danville, Kentucky, and in 1838, he earned a law degree from Transylvania University in Lexington, Kentucky. Afterward, he moved to Jackson, Mississippi, where he began his legal career. From 1838 to 1839, he served as Reading Clerk for the Mississippi state senate.

Magoffin returned to Kentucky in 1839 due to an illness. He continued his legal practice in Harrodsburg, and was appointed police judge of Harrodsburg by Governor Robert P. Letcher in 1840. On April 21, 1840, he married Anna Nelson Shelby. Shelby was the granddaughter of Kentucky's first and fifth governor, Isaac Shelby. Ten of the couple's children survived infancy.

Magoffin became active in the Democratic Party, serving as a presidential elector in 1844, 1848, 1852, and 1856 and as a delegate to the Democratic National Convention in 1848, 1856, 1860, and 1872. He served one term in the Kentucky Senate in 1850, but declined his party's nomination for a seat in the U.S. House of Representatives in 1851. In 1855 was the Democratic nominee for lieutenant governor, running on a ticket with Beverly L. Clarke, who was defeated by Know Nothing candidate Charles S. Morehead.

== Governor of Kentucky ==
Magoffin was elected Governor of Kentucky in the 1859 Kentucky gubernatorial election over Joshua Fry Bell, taking office on August 30. He supported states' rights and the institution of slavery. Although he believed in the right of states to secede from the union, he hoped to avoid this outcome by reaching an agreement between the southern and northern states. To that end, he wrote a circular letter to the governors of the slave states on December 9, 1860, detailing a plan to save the Union.

Magoffin's plan was to unite the slave states around a set of minimum concessions to see if the North would accept them as an alternative to war. The concessions included a constitutional amendment repealing any state law that interfered with enforcement of the Fugitive Slave Act, passage of amendments to the Fugitive Slave Act ensuring that any state that would not return a fugitive slave or obstructed a slave's return would compensate the owner of the slave, passage of a law requiring extradition of anyone indicted by a grand jury for enticing the escape of a slave, passage of an amendment to the constitution guaranteeing slavery in all current and future territories south of 36 degrees north latitude, passage of an amendment to the constitution guaranteeing all states the right of using the Mississippi River, and provide protection for southern states in the U.S. Senate from oppressive slavery legislation. After the slave state governors refused Magoffin's plan, he endorsed the Crittenden Compromise, authored by fellow Kentuckian John J. Crittenden.

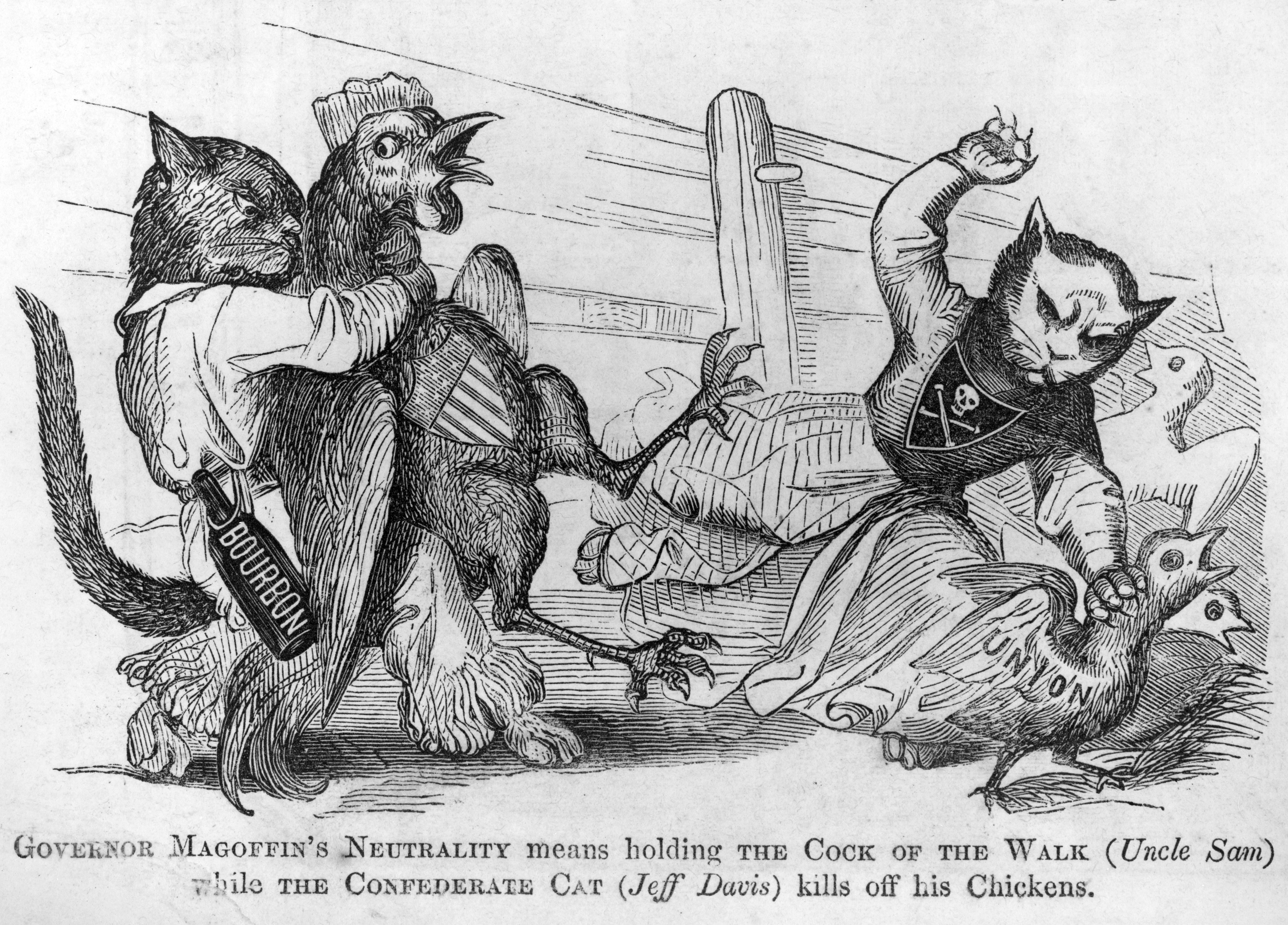
1861 political cartoon: "Governor Magoffin's neutrality means holding the cock of the walk (Uncle Sam) while the confederate cat (Jeff Davis) kills off his chickens."

In January 1861, Magoffin called the state legislature into special session and asked them to call a convention to determine Kentucky's course in the Civil War. The Unionist majority in the legislature feared that the vote of the convention would be to take Kentucky out of the Union; consequently, they refused to call the convention. In response to President Abraham Lincoln's call for troops on April 15, 1861, Magoffin defiantly declared by telegram, "I will send not a man nor a dollar for the wicked purpose of subduing my sister Southern States." Encouraged by Magoffin's rebuff of Lincoln, Confederate Secretary of War LeRoy Pope Walker requested Kentucky troops for the southern cause a week later, but Magoffin similarly refused him.

Magoffin called another special session of the legislature in May 1861. Again, the legislators refused to call a convention to determine the state's course in the war. Instead, they approved a resolution of neutrality, and Magoffin proclaimed this position on May 20, 1861. Later that month, Magoffin sent a letter to Confederate President Jefferson Davis asking that he recognize and honor Kentucky's neutrality. In August, he sent an identical letter to President Lincoln.

Although Magoffin pledged "to abide by the will of the majority of the people in the state" and to uphold the state and federal constitutions, Unionists in the legislature did not trust Magoffin. In the state's special elections in June 1861, Unionist candidates swept nine of Kentucky's ten congressional districts and obtained two-thirds majorities in both houses of the General Assembly. From then on, they routinely overrode Magoffin's vetoes.

In early September 1861, both federal and Confederate troops entered Kentucky. Magoffin declared both sides equally guilty of violating Kentucky's neutrality and demanded that both sides withdraw. A resolution calling for immediate withdrawal by both Union and Confederate forces was defeated in the legislature. Instead, the legislature passed a resolution ordering only the Confederate troops out of the state. Magoffin vetoed the resolution, but his veto was overridden, and he obediently issued the order for the Confederates to withdraw. In November 1861, a self-constituted convention of southern sympathizers met at Russellville, Kentucky, in order to form a provisional Confederate government for the state. Despite his southern sympathies, Magoffin denounced the actions of this convention.

Magoffin and the legislature continued to clash throughout the remainder of 1861 and into 1862. They found agreement only on the most menial of legislation, such as a bill to allow the common schools to continue the sessions that had been interrupted by the outbreak of hostilities in 1861. He found particularly onerous a bill forfeiting the citizenship of anyone who fought for or aided the Confederacy, but in March 1862, his veto of the bill was overridden. Magoffin also opposed the military rule of Brigadier General Jeremiah T. Boyle, who he believed was violating the civil rights of states' rights advocates, even if they did not advocate secession.

Calls by the legislature for Magoffin's resignation had begun as early as September 30, 1861. On August 16, 1862, Magoffin declared his willingness to resign on the condition that he be allowed to choose his successor. Because Lieutenant Governor Linn Boyd had died in office in 1859, Speaker of the Senate John F. Fisk was next in line for the governorship. Magoffin refused to accept Fisk as his successor, so Fisk resigned as speaker and the senate elevated Magoffin's choice, James F. Robinson, to speaker. Magoffin resigned as governor on August 18, 1862, and Robinson assumed the office of governor for the remainder of Magoffin's term.

== Later life and death ==
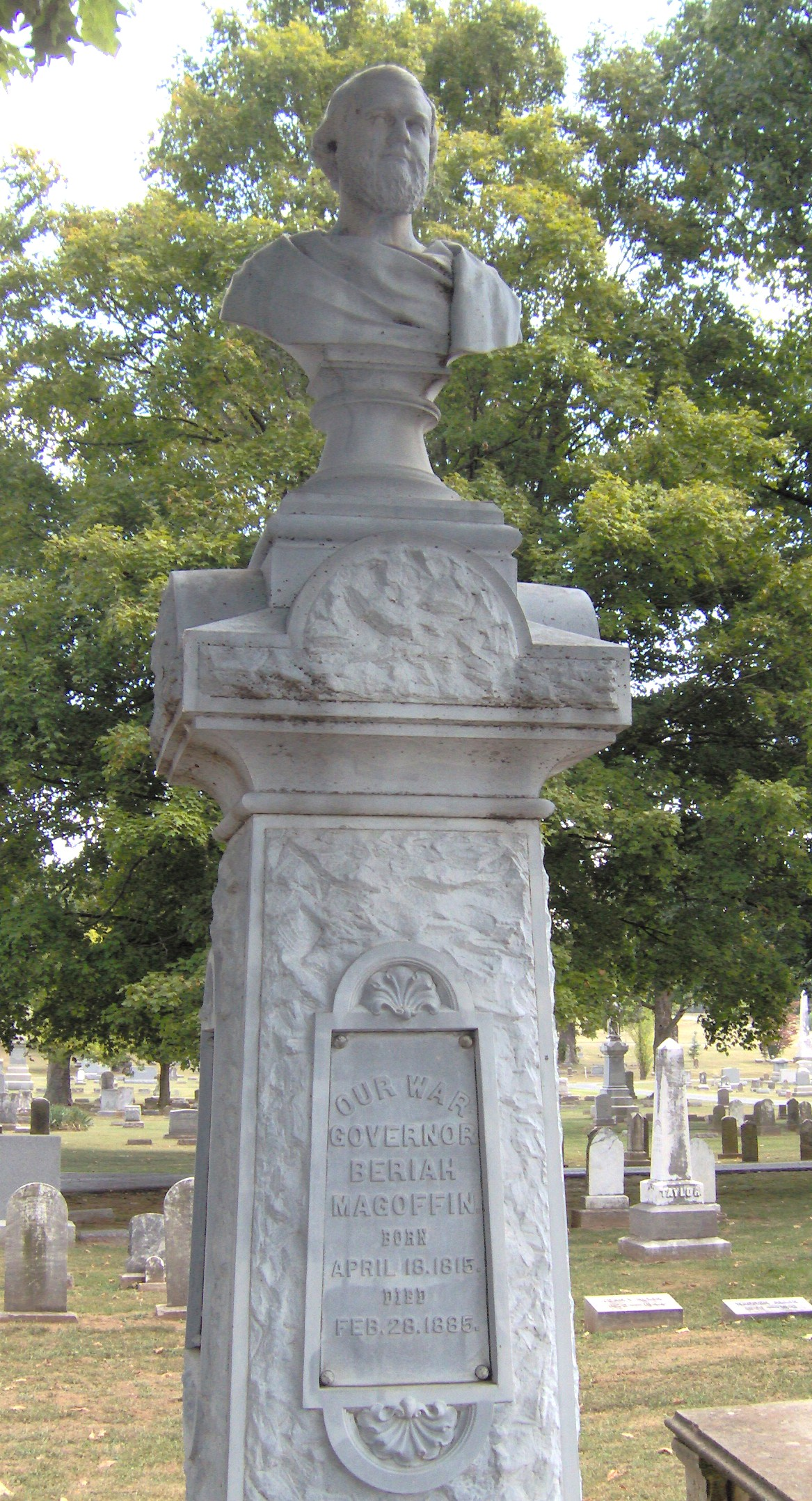
The Beriah Magoffin Monument in Harrodsburg

After the war, Magoffin returned to his legal practice and engaged in agricultural pursuits in Harrodsburg. A series of land speculation ventures near Chicago, Illinois made him very wealthy. He encouraged his fellow Kentuckians to accept the results of the war. He advocated for civil rights for blacks and urged passage of the Thirteenth Amendment.

In his last act of public service, Magoffin represented Mercer County in the Kentucky House of Representatives from 1867 to 1869. He died at home on February 28, 1885, and was buried in Spring Hill Cemetery in Harrodsburg. In 1900, a monument was erected in the cemetery in Magoffin's honor. Magoffin County, Kentucky, was created in 1860 and also named in his honor.

== See also ==
- Kentucky in the Civil War

Party political offices
Preceded by Beverly L. Clarke	Democratic nominee for Governor of Kentucky; 1859	Succeeded by Charles A. Wickliffe
Political offices
Preceded by Charles S. Morehead	Governor of Kentucky; 1859 – 1862	Succeeded by James F. Robinson
