= Kentucky's congressional delegations =

Since Kentucky became a U.S. state in 1792, it has sent congressional delegations to the United States Senate and United States House of Representatives. Each state elects two senators to serve for six years, and members of the House to two-year terms.

These are tables of congressional delegations from Kentucky to the United States Senate and the United States House of Representatives.

== Current delegation ==
Current U.S. senators from Kentucky
Kentucky CPVI (2025): R+15	Class II senator	Class III senator
Kentucky CPVI (2025): R+15	Mitch McConnell (Senior senator) (Louisville)	Rand Paul (Junior senator) (Bowling Green)
Party	Republican	Republican
Incumbent since	January 3, 1985	January 3, 2011

Kentucky's current congressional delegation in the 119th Congress consists of its two senators, both of whom are Republicans, and its six representatives: five Republicans and one Democrat.

The current dean of the Kentucky delegation is Representative and Dean of the House Hal Rogers of the 5th district, having served in the House since 1981.

Current U.S. representatives from Kentucky
District	Member (Residence)	Party	Incumbent since	CPVI (2025)	District map
1st	James Comer (Tompkinsville)	Republican	November 8, 2016	R+23	
2nd	Brett Guthrie (Bowling Green)	Republican	January 3, 2009	R+20	
3rd	Morgan McGarvey (Louisville)	Democratic	January 3, 2023	D+10	
4th	Thomas Massie (Garrison)	Republican	November 13, 2012	R+18	
5th	Hal Rogers (Somerset)	Republican	January 3, 1981	R+32	
6th	Andy Barr (Lexington)	Republican	January 3, 2013	R+7	

== United States Senate ==
Class II senator	Congress	Class III senator
John Brown (AA)	2nd (1791–1793)	John Edwards (AA)
John Brown (AA)	3rd (1793–1795)	John Edwards (AA)
John Brown (DR)	4th (1795–1797)	Humphrey Marshall (F)
John Brown (DR)	5th (1797–1799)	Humphrey Marshall (F)
John Brown (DR)	6th (1799–1801)	Humphrey Marshall (F)
John Brown (DR)	7th (1801–1803)	John Breckinridge (DR)
John Brown (DR)	8th (1803–1805)	John Breckinridge (DR)
Buckner Thruston (DR)	9th (1805–1807)	John Breckinridge (DR)
Buckner Thruston (DR)	9th (1805–1807)	John Adair (DR)
Buckner Thruston (DR)	9th (1805–1807)	Henry Clay (DR)
Buckner Thruston (DR)	10th (1807–1809)	John Pope (DR)
Buckner Thruston (DR)	11th (1809–1811)	John Pope (DR)
Henry Clay (DR)	11th (1809–1811)	John Pope (DR)
George M. Bibb (DR)	12th (1811–1813)	John Pope (DR)
George M. Bibb (DR)	13th (1813–1815)	Jesse Bledsoe (DR)
George Walker (DR)	13th (1813–1815)	Jesse Bledsoe (DR)
William T. Barry (DR)	13th (1813–1815)	Isham Talbot (DR)
William T. Barry (DR)	14th (1815–1817)	Isham Talbot (DR)
Martin D. Hardin (DR)	14th (1815–1817)	Isham Talbot (DR)
John J. Crittenden (DR)	15th (1817–1819)	Isham Talbot (DR)
Richard Mentor Johnson (DR)	16th (1819–1821)	William Logan (DR)
Richard Mentor Johnson (DR)	16th (1819–1821)	Isham Talbot (DR)
Richard Mentor Johnson (DR)	17th (1821–1823)	Isham Talbot (DR)
Richard Mentor Johnson (DR)	18th (1823–1825)	Isham Talbot (DR)
Richard Mentor Johnson (J)	19th (1825–1827)	John Rowan (J)
Richard Mentor Johnson (J)	20th (1827–1829)	John Rowan (J)
George M. Bibb (J)	21st (1829–1831)	John Rowan (J)
George M. Bibb (J)	22nd (1831–1833)	Henry Clay (NR)
George M. Bibb (J)	23rd (1833–1835)	Henry Clay (NR)
John J. Crittenden (NR)	24th (1835–1837)	Henry Clay (NR)
John J. Crittenden (W)	25th (1837–1839)	Henry Clay (W)
John J. Crittenden (W)	26th (1839–1841)	Henry Clay (W)
James T. Morehead (W)	27th (1841–1843)	Henry Clay (W)
James T. Morehead (W)	27th (1841–1843)	John J. Crittenden (W)
James T. Morehead (W)	28th (1843–1845)	John J. Crittenden (W)
James T. Morehead (W)	29th (1845–1847)	John J. Crittenden (W)
Joseph R. Underwood (W)	30th (1847–1849)	John J. Crittenden (W)
Joseph R. Underwood (W)	30th (1847–1849)	Thomas Metcalfe (W)
Joseph R. Underwood (W)	31st (1849–1851)	Henry Clay (W)
Joseph R. Underwood (W)	32nd (1851–1853)	Henry Clay (W)
Joseph R. Underwood (W)	32nd (1851–1853)	David Meriwether (D)
Joseph R. Underwood (W)	32nd (1851–1853)	Archibald Dixon (W)
John Burton Thompson (KN)	33rd (1853–1855)	Archibald Dixon (W)
John Burton Thompson (KN)	34th (1855–1857)	John J. Crittenden (W)
John Burton Thompson (KN)	35th (1857–1859)	John J. Crittenden (KN)
Lazarus Powell (D)	36th (1859–1861)	John J. Crittenden (KN)
Lazarus Powell (D)	37th (1861–1863)	John C. Breckinridge (D)
Lazarus Powell (D)	37th (1861–1863)	Garrett Davis (U)
Lazarus Powell (D)	38th (1863–1865)	Garrett Davis (U)
James Guthrie (D)	39th (1865–1867)	Garrett Davis (U)
James Guthrie (D)	40th (1867–1869)	Garrett Davis (D)
Thomas C. McCreery (D)	40th (1867–1869)	Garrett Davis (D)
Thomas C. McCreery (D)	41st (1869–1871)	Garrett Davis (D)
John W. Stevenson (D)	42nd (1871–1873)	Garrett Davis (D)
John W. Stevenson (D)	42nd (1871–1873)	Willis B. Machen (D)
John W. Stevenson (D)	43rd (1873–1875)	Thomas C. McCreery (D)
John W. Stevenson (D)	44th (1875–1877)	Thomas C. McCreery (D)
James B. Beck (D)	45th (1877–1879)	Thomas C. McCreery (D)
James B. Beck (D)	46th (1879–1881)	John Stuart Williams (D)
James B. Beck (D)	47th (1881–1883)	John Stuart Williams (D)
James B. Beck (D)	48th (1883–1885)	John Stuart Williams (D)
James B. Beck (D)	49th (1885–1887)	J. C. S. Blackburn (D)
James B. Beck (D)	50th (1887–1889)	J. C. S. Blackburn (D)
James B. Beck (D)	51st (1889–1891)	J. C. S. Blackburn (D)
John G. Carlisle (D)	51st (1889–1891)	J. C. S. Blackburn (D)
John G. Carlisle (D)	52nd (1891–1893)	J. C. S. Blackburn (D)
William Lindsay (D)	52nd (1891–1893)	J. C. S. Blackburn (D)
William Lindsay (D)	53rd (1893–1895)	J. C. S. Blackburn (D)
William Lindsay (D)	54th (1895–1897)	J. C. S. Blackburn (D)
William Lindsay (D)	55th (1897–1899)	William J. Deboe (R)
William Lindsay (D)	56th (1899–1901)	William J. Deboe (R)
J. C. S. Blackburn (D)	57th (1901–1903)	William J. Deboe (R)
J. C. S. Blackburn (D)	58th (1903–1905)	James B. McCreary (D)
J. C. S. Blackburn (D)	59th (1905–1907)	James B. McCreary (D)
Thomas H. Paynter (D)	60th (1907–1909)	James B. McCreary (D)
Thomas H. Paynter (D)	61st (1909–1911)	William O'Connell Bradley (R)
Thomas H. Paynter (D)	62nd (1911–1913)	William O'Connell Bradley (R)
Ollie Murray James (D)	63rd (1913–1915)	William O'Connell Bradley (R)
Ollie Murray James (D)	63rd (1913–1915)	Johnson N. Camden Jr. (D)
Ollie Murray James (D)	64th (1915–1917)	J. C. W. Beckham (D)
Ollie Murray James (D)	65th (1917–1919)	J. C. W. Beckham (D)
George B. Martin (D)	65th (1917–1919)	J. C. W. Beckham (D)
Augustus Owsley Stanley (D)	66th (1919–1921)	J. C. W. Beckham (D)
Augustus Owsley Stanley (D)	67th (1921–1923)	Richard P. Ernst (R)
Augustus Owsley Stanley (D)	68th (1923–1925)	Richard P. Ernst (R)
Frederic M. Sackett (R)	69th (1925–1927)	Richard P. Ernst (R)
Frederic M. Sackett (R)	70th (1927–1929)	Alben W. Barkley (D)
Frederic M. Sackett (R)	71st (1929–1931)	Alben W. Barkley (D)
John M. Robsion (R)	71st (1929–1931)	Alben W. Barkley (D)
Ben M. Williamson (D)	71st (1929–1931)	Alben W. Barkley (D)
M. M. Logan (D)	72nd (1931–1933)	Alben W. Barkley (D)
M. M. Logan (D)	73rd (1933–1935)	Alben W. Barkley (D)
M. M. Logan (D)	74th (1935–1937)	Alben W. Barkley (D)
M. M. Logan (D)	75th (1937–1939)	Alben W. Barkley (D)
M. M. Logan (D)	76th (1939–1941)	Alben W. Barkley (D)
Happy Chandler (D)	76th (1939–1941)	Alben W. Barkley (D)
Happy Chandler (D)	77th (1941–1943)	Alben W. Barkley (D)
Happy Chandler (D)	78th (1943–1945)	Alben W. Barkley (D)
Happy Chandler (D)	79th (1945–1947)	Alben W. Barkley (D)
William A. Stanfill (R)	79th (1945–1947)	Alben W. Barkley (D)
John Sherman Cooper (R)	79th (1945–1947)	Alben W. Barkley (D)
John Sherman Cooper (R)	80th (1947–1949)	Alben W. Barkley (D)
Virgil Chapman (D)	81st (1949–1951)	Alben W. Barkley (D)
Virgil Chapman (D)	81st (1949–1951)	Garrett Withers (D)
Virgil Chapman (D)	81st (1949–1951)	Earle Clements (D)
Virgil Chapman (D)	82nd (1951–1953)	Earle Clements (D)
Thomas R. Underwood (D)	82nd (1951–1953)	Earle Clements (D)
John Sherman Cooper (R)	82nd (1951–1953)	Earle Clements (D)
John Sherman Cooper (R)	83rd (1953–1955)	Earle Clements (D)
Alben W. Barkley (D)	84th (1955–1957)	Earle Clements (D)
Robert Humphreys (D)	84th (1955–1957)	Earle Clements (D)
John Sherman Cooper (R)	84th (1955–1957)	Earle Clements (D)
John Sherman Cooper (R)	85th (1957–1959)	Thruston Ballard Morton (R)
John Sherman Cooper (R)	86th (1959–1961)	Thruston Ballard Morton (R)
John Sherman Cooper (R)	87th (1961–1963)	Thruston Ballard Morton (R)
John Sherman Cooper (R)	88th (1963–1965)	Thruston Ballard Morton (R)
John Sherman Cooper (R)	89th (1965–1967)	Thruston Ballard Morton (R)
John Sherman Cooper (R)	90th (1967–1969)	Thruston Ballard Morton (R)
John Sherman Cooper (R)	90th (1967–1969)	Marlow Cook (R)
John Sherman Cooper (R)	91st (1969–1971)	Marlow Cook (R)
John Sherman Cooper (R)	92nd (1971–1973)	Marlow Cook (R)
Walter Dee Huddleston (D)	93rd (1973–1975)	Marlow Cook (R)
Walter Dee Huddleston (D)	93rd (1973–1975)	Wendell Ford (D)
Walter Dee Huddleston (D)	94th (1975–1977)	Wendell Ford (D)
Walter Dee Huddleston (D)	95th (1977–1979)	Wendell Ford (D)
Walter Dee Huddleston (D)	96th (1979–1981)	Wendell Ford (D)
Walter Dee Huddleston (D)	97th (1981–1983)	Wendell Ford (D)
Walter Dee Huddleston (D)	98th (1983–1985)	Wendell Ford (D)
Mitch McConnell (R)	99th (1985–1987)	Wendell Ford (D)
Mitch McConnell (R)	100th (1987–1989)	Wendell Ford (D)
Mitch McConnell (R)	101st (1989–1991)	Wendell Ford (D)
Mitch McConnell (R)	102nd (1991–1993)	Wendell Ford (D)
Mitch McConnell (R)	103rd (1993–1995)	Wendell Ford (D)
Mitch McConnell (R)	104th (1995–1997)	Wendell Ford (D)
Mitch McConnell (R)	105th (1997–1999)	Wendell Ford (D)
Mitch McConnell (R)	106th (1999–2001)	Jim Bunning (R)
Mitch McConnell (R)	107th (2001–2003)	Jim Bunning (R)
Mitch McConnell (R)	108th (2003–2005)	Jim Bunning (R)
Mitch McConnell (R)	109th (2005–2007)	Jim Bunning (R)
Mitch McConnell (R)	110th (2007–2009)	Jim Bunning (R)
Mitch McConnell (R)	111th (2009–2011)	Jim Bunning (R)
Mitch McConnell (R)	112th (2011–2013)	Rand Paul (R)
Mitch McConnell (R)	113th (2013–2015)	Rand Paul (R)
Mitch McConnell (R)	114th (2015–2017)	Rand Paul (R)
Mitch McConnell (R)	115th (2017–2019)	Rand Paul (R)
Mitch McConnell (R)	116th (2019–2021)	Rand Paul (R)
Mitch McConnell (R)	117th (2021–2023)	Rand Paul (R)
Mitch McConnell (R)	118th (2023–2025)	Rand Paul (R)
Mitch McConnell (R)	119th (2025–2027)	Rand Paul (R)
Andy Barr (D)	120th (2027–2029)	Rand Paul (R)

== U.S. House of Representatives ==
=== 1792–1803: 2 seats ===
Following statehood on June 1, 1792, Kentucky had two seats in the House.

Congress	1st district	2nd district
2nd (1792–1793)	Christopher Greenup (AA)	Alexander D. Orr (AA)
3rd (1793–1795)	Christopher Greenup (AA)	Alexander D. Orr (AA)
4th (1795–1797)	Christopher Greenup (DR)	Alexander D. Orr (DR)
5th (1797–1799)	Thomas Terry Davis (DR)	John Fowler (DR)
6th (1799–1801)	Thomas Terry Davis (DR)	John Fowler (DR)
7th (1801–1803)	Thomas Terry Davis (DR)	John Fowler (DR)

=== 1803–1813: 6 seats ===
Following the 1800 census, Kentucky was apportioned 6 seats.

Congress	1st district	2nd district	3rd district	4th district	5th district	6th district
8th (1803–1805)	Matthew Lyon (DR)	John Boyle (DR)	Matthew Walton (DR)	Thomas; Sandford (DR)	John Fowler (DR)	George M. Bedinger (DR)
9th (1805–1807)	Matthew Lyon (DR)	John Boyle (DR)	Matthew Walton (DR)	Thomas; Sandford (DR)	John Fowler (DR)	George M. Bedinger (DR)
10th (1807–1809)	Matthew Lyon (DR)	John Boyle (DR)	John Rowan (DR)	Richard Mentor; Johnson (DR)	Benjamin; Howard (DR)	Joseph Desha (DR)
11th (1809–1811)	Matthew Lyon (DR)	Samuel; McKee (DR)	Henry Crist (DR)	Richard Mentor; Johnson (DR)	Benjamin; Howard (DR)	Joseph Desha (DR)
11th (1809–1811)	Matthew Lyon (DR)	Samuel; McKee (DR)	Henry Crist (DR)	Richard Mentor; Johnson (DR)	William T. Barry (DR)	Joseph Desha (DR)
12th (1811–1813)	Anthony New (DR)	Samuel; McKee (DR)	Stephen Ormsby (DR)	Richard Mentor; Johnson (DR)	Henry Clay (DR)	Joseph Desha (DR)

=== 1813–1823: 10 seats ===
Following the 1810 census, Kentucky was apportioned 10 seats.

Congress	District									
Congress	1st	2nd	3rd	4th	5th	6th	7th	8th	9th	10th
13th (1813–1815)	James; Clark (DR)	Henry Clay (DR)	Richard Mentor; Johnson (DR)	Joseph; Desha (DR)	William Pope; Duval (DR)	Solomon P. Sharp (DR)	Samuel; McKee (DR)	Stephen; Ormsby (DR)	Samuel; Hopkins (DR)	Thomas; Montgomery (DR)
13th (1813–1815)	James; Clark (DR)	Joseph Hawkins (DR)	Richard Mentor; Johnson (DR)	Joseph; Desha (DR)	William Pope; Duval (DR)	Solomon P. Sharp (DR)	Samuel; McKee (DR)	Stephen; Ormsby (DR)	Samuel; Hopkins (DR)	Thomas; Montgomery (DR)
14th (1815–1817)	James; Clark (DR)	Henry; Clay (DR)	Richard Mentor; Johnson (DR)	Joseph; Desha (DR)	Alney; McLean (DR)	Solomon P. Sharp (DR)	Samuel; McKee (DR)	Stephen; Ormsby (DR)	Micah; Taul (DR)	Benjamin; Hardin (DR)
14th (1815–1817)	Thomas Fletcher (DR)	Henry; Clay (DR)	Richard Mentor; Johnson (DR)	Joseph; Desha (DR)	Alney; McLean (DR)	Solomon P. Sharp (DR)	Samuel; McKee (DR)	Stephen; Ormsby (DR)	Micah; Taul (DR)	Benjamin; Hardin (DR)
15th (1817–1819)	David; Trimble (DR)	Henry; Clay (DR)	Richard Mentor; Johnson (DR)	Joseph; Desha (DR)	Anthony New (DR)	David; Walker (DR)	George; Robertson (DR)	Robert C. Anderson Jr. (DR)	Tunstall; Quarles (DR)	Thomas Speed (DR)
16th (1819–1821)	David; Trimble (DR)	Henry; Clay (DR)	William; Brown (DR)	Thomas; Metcalfe (DR)	Alney; McLean (DR)	David; Walker (DR)	George; Robertson (DR)	Robert C. Anderson Jr. (DR)	Tunstall; Quarles (DR)	Benjamin; Hardin (DR)
16th (1819–1821)	David; Trimble (DR)	Henry; Clay (DR)	William; Brown (DR)	Thomas; Metcalfe (DR)	Alney; McLean (DR)	Francis; Johnson (DR)	George; Robertson (DR)	Robert C. Anderson Jr. (DR)	Thomas; Montgomery (DR)	Benjamin; Hardin (DR)
17th (1821–1823)	David; Trimble (DR)	Samuel H. Woodson (DR)	John Telemachus; Johnson (DR)	Thomas; Metcalfe (DR)	Anthony; New (DR)	Francis; Johnson (DR)	George; Robertson (DR)	Wingfield Bullock (DR)	Thomas; Montgomery (DR)	Benjamin; Hardin (DR)
17th (1821–1823)	David; Trimble (DR)	Samuel H. Woodson (DR)	John Telemachus; Johnson (DR)	Thomas; Metcalfe (DR)	Anthony; New (DR)	Francis; Johnson (DR)	John S. Smith (DR)	James Breckinridge (DR)	Thomas; Montgomery (DR)	Benjamin; Hardin (DR)

=== 1823–1833: 12 seats ===
Following the 1820 census, Kentucky was apportioned 12 seats.

Congress	District										District	
Congress	1st	2nd	3rd	4th	5th	6th	7th	8th	9th	10th	11th	12th
18th (1823–1825)	David; Trimble (DR) (Note: Supported the Adams-Clay faction in the 1824 United States presidential election.)	Thomas; Metcalfe (DR)	Henry; Clay (DR)	Robert P. Letcher (DR)	John Telemachus; Johnson (DR) (Note: Supported the Jackson faction in the 1824 United States presidential election.)	David; White (DR)	Thomas P. Moore (DR)	Richard A. Buckner (DR)	Charles A. Wickliffe (DR)	Francis; Johnson (DR)	Philip; Thompson (DR)	Robert P. Henry (DR)
19th (1825–1827)	David; Trimble (NR)	Thomas; Metcalfe (NR)	Henry Clay (NR)	Robert P. Letcher (NR)	James Johnson (J)	Joseph; Lecompte (J)	Thomas P. Moore (J)	Richard A. Buckner (NR)	Charles A. Wickliffe (J)	Francis; Johnson (NR)	William S. Young (NR)	Robert P. Henry (J)
19th (1825–1827)	David; Trimble (NR)	Thomas; Metcalfe (NR)	James; Clark (NR)	Robert P. Letcher (NR)	Robert L. McHatton (J)	Joseph; Lecompte (J)	Thomas P. Moore (J)	Richard A. Buckner (NR)	Charles A. Wickliffe (J)	Francis; Johnson (NR)	William S. Young (NR)	John Flournoy; Henry (NR)
20th (1827–1829)	Henry; Daniel (J)	Thomas; Metcalfe (NR)	James; Clark (NR)	Robert P. Letcher (NR)	Robert L. McHatton (J)	Joseph; Lecompte (J)	Thomas P. Moore (J)	Richard A. Buckner (NR)	Charles A. Wickliffe (J)	Joel Yancey (J)	William S. Young (NR)	Chittenden; Lyon (J)
20th (1827–1829)	Henry; Daniel (J)	Thomas; Metcalfe (NR)	James; Clark (NR)	Robert P. Letcher (NR)	Robert L. McHatton (J)	Joseph; Lecompte (J)	Thomas P. Moore (J)	Richard A. Buckner (NR)	Charles A. Wickliffe (J)	Joel Yancey (J)	John Calhoon (NR)	Chittenden; Lyon (J)
20th (1827–1829)	Henry; Daniel (J)	John Chambers (NR)	James; Clark (NR)	Robert P. Letcher (NR)	Robert L. McHatton (J)	Joseph; Lecompte (J)	Thomas P. Moore (J)	Richard A. Buckner (NR)	Charles A. Wickliffe (J)	Joel Yancey (J)	Thomas Chilton (J)	Chittenden; Lyon (J)
21st (1829–1831)	Henry; Daniel (J)	Nicholas D. Coleman (J)	James; Clark (NR)	Robert P. Letcher (NR)	Richard Mentor; Johnson (J)	Joseph; Lecompte (J)	John Kincaid (J)	Nathan; Gaither (J)	Charles A. Wickliffe (J)	Joel Yancey (J)	Thomas Chilton (J)	Chittenden; Lyon (J)
22nd (1831–1833)	Henry; Daniel (J)	Thomas A. Marshall (NR)	Chilton; Allan (NR)	Robert P. Letcher (NR)	Richard Mentor; Johnson (J)	Joseph; Lecompte (J)	John Adair (J)	Nathan; Gaither (J)	Charles A. Wickliffe (J)	Christopher; Tompkins (NR)	Albert Gallatin; Hawes (J)	Chittenden; Lyon (J)

=== 1833–1843: 13 seats ===
Following the 1830 census, Kentucky was apportioned 13 seats.

Congress	District										District		
Congress	1st	2nd	3rd	4th	5th	6th	7th	8th	9th	10th	11th	12th	13th
23rd (1833–1835)	Chittenden; Lyon (J)	Albert Gallatin; Hawes (J)	Christopher; Tompkins (NR)	Martin; Beaty (NR)	vacant	Thomas; Chilton (NR)	Benjamin; Hardin (NR)	Patrick H. Pope (J)	James; Love (NR)	Chilton; Allan (NR)	Amos; Davis (NR)	Thomas A. Marshall (NR)	Richard Mentor; Johnson (J)
23rd (1833–1835)	Chittenden; Lyon (J)	Albert Gallatin; Hawes (J)	Christopher; Tompkins (NR)	Martin; Beaty (NR)	Robert P. Letcher (NR)	Thomas; Chilton (NR)	Benjamin; Hardin (NR)	Patrick H. Pope (J)	James; Love (NR)	Chilton; Allan (NR)	Amos; Davis (NR)	Thomas A. Marshall (NR)	Richard Mentor; Johnson (J)
24th (1835–1837)	Linn; Boyd (J)	Albert Gallatin; Hawes (J)	Joseph R. Underwood (NR)	Sherrod; Williams (NR)	James; Harlan (NR)	John; Calhoon (NR)	Benjamin; Hardin (NR)	William J. Graves (NR)	John; White (NR)	Chilton; Allan (NR)	Richard; French (J)	John; Chambers (NR)	Richard Mentor; Johnson (J)
25th (1837–1839)	John L. Murray (D)	Edward; Rumsey (W)	Joseph R. Underwood (W)	Sherrod; Williams (W)	James; Harlan (W)	John; Calhoon (W)	John; Pope (W)	William J. Graves (W)	John; White (W)	Richard; Hawes (W)	Richard; Menefee (W)	John; Chambers (W)	William Wright; Southgate (W)
26th (1839–1841)	Linn; Boyd (D)	Philip; Triplett (W)	Joseph R. Underwood (W)	Sherrod; Williams (W)	Simeon Anderson (W)	Willis; Green (W)	John; Pope (W)	William J. Graves (W)	John; White (W)	Richard; Hawes (W)	Landaff; Andrews (W)	Garrett; Davis (W)	William O. Butler (D)
26th (1839–1841)	Linn; Boyd (D)	Philip; Triplett (W)	Joseph R. Underwood (W)	Sherrod; Williams (W)	John Burton; Thompson (W)	Willis; Green (W)	John; Pope (W)	William J. Graves (W)	John; White (W)	Richard; Hawes (W)	Landaff; Andrews (W)	Garrett; Davis (W)	William O. Butler (D)
27th (1841–1843)	Linn; Boyd (D)	Philip; Triplett (W)	Joseph R. Underwood (W)	Bryan; Owsley (W)	John Burton; Thompson (W)	Willis; Green (W)	John; Pope (W)	James; Sprigg (W)	John; White (W)	Thomas Francis; Marshall (W)	Landaff; Andrews (W)	Garrett; Davis (W)	William O. Butler (D)

=== 1843–1863: 10 seats ===
Following the 1840 census, Kentucky was apportioned 10 seats.

Congress	District									
Congress	1st	2nd	3rd	4th	5th	6th	7th	8th	9th	10th
28th (1843–1845)	Linn; Boyd (D)	Willis; Green (W)	Henry; Grider (W)	George; Caldwell (D)	James W. Stone (D)	John; White (W)	William; Thomasson (W)	Garrett; Davis (W)	Richard; French (D)	John W. Tibbatts (D)
29th (1845–1847)	Linn; Boyd (D)	John H. McHenry (W)	Henry; Grider (W)	Joshua Fry; Bell (W)	Bryan; Young (W)	John Preston; Martin (D)	William; Thomasson (W)	Garrett; Davis (W)	Andrew; Trumbo (W)	John W. Tibbatts (D)
30th (1847–1849)	Linn; Boyd (D)	Beverly L. Clarke (D)	Samuel; Peyton (D)	Aylette; Buckner (W)	John Burton; Thompson (W)	Green; Adams (W)	Garnett; Duncan (W)	Charles S. Morehead (W)	Richard; French (D)	John P. Gaines (W)
31st (1849–1851)	Linn; Boyd (D)	James Leeper; Johnson (W)	Finis; McLean (W)	George; Caldwell (D)	John Burton; Thompson (W)	Daniel; Breck (W)	Humphrey; Marshall (W)	Charles S. Morehead (W)	John Calvin; Mason (D)	Richard H. Stanton (D)
32nd (1851–1853)	Linn; Boyd (D)	Benjamin E. Grey (W)	Presley; Ewing (W)	William Thomas; Ward (W)	James W. Stone (D)	Addison; White (W)	Humphrey; Marshall (W)	John C. Breckinridge (D)	John Calvin; Mason (D)	Richard H. Stanton (D)
32nd (1851–1853)	Linn; Boyd (D)	Benjamin E. Grey (W)	Presley; Ewing (W)	William Thomas; Ward (W)	James W. Stone (D)	Addison; White (W)	William; Preston (W)	John C. Breckinridge (D)	John Calvin; Mason (D)	Richard H. Stanton (D)
33rd (1853–1855)	Linn; Boyd (D)	Benjamin E. Grey (W)	Presley; Ewing (W)	James; Chrisman (D)	Clement S. Hill (W)	John Milton; Elliott (D)	William; Preston (W)	John C. Breckinridge (D)	Leander; Cox (W)	Richard H. Stanton (D)
33rd (1853–1855)	Linn; Boyd (D)	Benjamin E. Grey (W)	Francis; Bristow (W)	James; Chrisman (D)	Clement S. Hill (W)	John Milton; Elliott (D)	William; Preston (W)	John C. Breckinridge (D)	Leander; Cox (W)	Richard H. Stanton (D)
34th (1855–1857)	Henry; Cornelius; Burnett (D)	John P. Campbell Jr. (KN)	Warner; Underwood (KN)	Albert G. Talbott (D)	Joshua; Jewett (D)	John Milton; Elliott (D)	Humphrey; Marshall (KN)	Alexander Keith; Marshall (KN)	Leander; Cox (W)	Samuel F. Swope (KN)
35th (1857–1859)	Henry; Cornelius; Burnett (D)	Samuel; Peyton (D)	Warner; Underwood (KN)	Albert G. Talbott (D)	Joshua; Jewett (D)	John Milton; Elliott (D)	Humphrey; Marshall (KN)	James Brown; Clay (D)	John Calvin; Mason (D)	John W. Stevenson (D)
36th (1859–1861)	Henry; Cornelius; Burnett (D)	Samuel; Peyton (D)	Francis; Bristow (O)	William Clayton; Anderson (O)	John Y. Brown (D)	Green; Adams (O)	Robert; Mallory (O)	William E. Simms (D)	Laban T. Moore (O)	John W. Stevenson (D)
37th (1861–1863)	Henry; Cornelius; Burnett (D)	J. S. Jackson (U)	Henry; Grider (U)	Aaron; Harding (U)	Charles A. Wickliffe (U)	George W. Dunlap (U)	Robert; Mallory (U)	John J. Crittenden (U)	William H. Wadsworth (U)	John W. Menzies (U)
37th (1861–1863)	Samuel Casey (U)	George Yeaman (U)	Henry; Grider (U)	Aaron; Harding (U)	Charles A. Wickliffe (U)	George W. Dunlap (U)	Robert; Mallory (U)	John J. Crittenden (U)	William H. Wadsworth (U)	John W. Menzies (U)

=== 1863–1873: 9 seats ===
Following the 1860 census, Kentucky was apportioned 9 seats.

Congress	District								
Congress	1st	2nd	3rd	4th	5th	6th	7th	8th	9th
38th (1863–1865)	Lucien; Anderson (UU)	George; Yeaman (U)	Henry; Grider (U)	Aaron; Harding (U)	Robert; Mallory (U)	Green C. Smith (UU)	Brutus J. Clay (U)	William H. Randall (UU)	William H. Wadsworth (U)
39th (1865–1867)	Lawrence S. Trimble (D)	Burwell C. Ritter (D)	Henry; Grider (U)	Aaron; Harding (U)	Lovell; Rousseau (UU)	Green C. Smith (UU)	George S. Shanklin (D)	William H. Randall (UU)	Samuel; McKee (UU)
39th (1865–1867)	Lawrence S. Trimble (D)	Burwell C. Ritter (D)	Elijah; Hise (D)	Aaron; Harding (U)	Lovell; Rousseau (UU)	Andrew Ward (D)	George S. Shanklin (D)	William H. Randall (UU)	Samuel; McKee (UU)
40th (1867–1869)	Lawrence S. Trimble (D)	vacant	Elijah; Hise (D)	J. Proctor; Knott (D)	Asa; Grover (D)	Thomas L. Jones (D)	James B. Beck (D)	George M. Adams (D)	vacant
40th (1867–1869)	Lawrence S. Trimble (D)	vacant	Jacob; Golladay (D)	J. Proctor; Knott (D)	Asa; Grover (D)	Thomas L. Jones (D)	James B. Beck (D)	George M. Adams (D)	Samuel McKee (R)
41st (1869–1871)	Lawrence S. Trimble (D)	William N. Sweeney (D)	Jacob; Golladay (D)	J. Proctor; Knott (D)	Boyd; Winchester (D)	Thomas L. Jones (D)	James B. Beck (D)	George M. Adams (D)	John McConnell; Rice (D)
41st (1869–1871)	Lawrence S. Trimble (D)	William N. Sweeney (D)	Joseph Horace; Lewis (D)	J. Proctor; Knott (D)	Boyd; Winchester (D)	Thomas L. Jones (D)	James B. Beck (D)	George M. Adams (D)	John McConnell; Rice (D)
42nd (1871–1873)	Edward; Crossland (D)	Henry D. McHenry (D)	Joseph Horace; Lewis (D)	William B. Read (D)	Boyd; Winchester (D)	William Evans; Arthur (D)	James B. Beck (D)	George M. Adams (D)	John McConnell; Rice (D)

=== 1873–1883: 10 seats ===
Following the 1870 census, Kentucky was apportioned 10 seats.

Congress	District									
Congress	1st	2nd	3rd	4th	5th	6th	7th	8th	9th	10th
43rd (1873–1875)	Edward; Crossland (D)	John Y. Brown (D)	Charles W. Milliken (D)	William B. Read (D)	Elisha Standiford (D)	William Evans; Arthur (D)	James B. Beck (D)	Milton J. Durham (D)	George M. Adams (D)	John Duncan; Young (D)
44th (1875–1877)	Andrew; Boone (D)	John Y. Brown (D)	Charles W. Milliken (D)	J. Proctor; Knott (D)	Edward Parsons (D)	Thomas L. Jones (D)	J. C. S. Blackburn (D)	Milton J. Durham (D)	John D. White (R)	John Blades; Clarke (D)
44th (1875–1877)	Andrew; Boone (D)	John Y. Brown (D)	Charles W. Milliken (D)	J. Proctor; Knott (D)	Henry Watterson (D)	Thomas L. Jones (D)	J. C. S. Blackburn (D)	Milton J. Durham (D)	John D. White (R)	John Blades; Clarke (D)
45th (1877–1879)	Andrew; Boone (D)	James A. McKenzie (D)	John W. Caldwell (D)	J. Proctor; Knott (D)	Albert S. Willis (D)	John G. Carlisle (D)	J. C. S. Blackburn (D)	Milton J. Durham (D)	Thomas; Turner (D)	John Blades; Clarke (D)
46th (1879–1881)	Oscar; Turner (ID)	James A. McKenzie (D)	John W. Caldwell (D)	J. Proctor; Knott (D)	Albert S. Willis (D)	John G. Carlisle (D)	J. C. S. Blackburn (D)	Philip B. Thompson; Jr. (D)	Thomas; Turner (D)	Elijah; Phister (D)
47th (1881–1883)	Oscar; Turner (ID)	James A. McKenzie (D)	John W. Caldwell (D)	J. Proctor; Knott (D)	Albert S. Willis (D)	John G. Carlisle (D)	J. C. S. Blackburn (D)	Philip B. Thompson; Jr. (D)	John D. White (R)	Elijah; Phister (D)

=== 1883–1933: 11 seats ===
Following the 1880 census, Kentucky was apportioned 11 seats.

Congress	District										
Congress	1st	2nd	3rd	4th	5th	6th	7th	8th	9th	10th	11th
48th (1883–1885)	Oscar Turner (ID)	James F. Clay (D)	John E. Halsell (D)	Thomas A. Robertson (D)	Albert S. Willis (D)	John G. Carlisle (D)	J. C. S. Blackburn (D)	Philip B. Thompson Jr. (D)	William Wirt; Culbertson (R)	John D. White (R)	Frank Lane; Wolford (D)
49th (1885–1887)	William Johnson; Stone (D)	Polk; Laffoon (D)	John E. Halsell (D)	Thomas A. Robertson (D)	Albert S. Willis (D)	John G. Carlisle (D)	William; Breckinridge (D)	James B. McCreary (D)	William H. Wadsworth (R)	William P. Taulbee (D)	Frank Lane; Wolford (D)
50th (1887–1889)	William Johnson; Stone (D)	Polk; Laffoon (D)	W. Godfrey; Hunter (R)	Alexander B. Montgomery (D)	Asher G. Caruth (D)	John G. Carlisle (D)	William; Breckinridge (D)	James B. McCreary (D)	George M. Thomas (R)	William P. Taulbee (D)	Hugh F. Finley (R)
51st (1889–1891)	William Johnson; Stone (D)	William T. Ellis (D)	Isaac; Goodnight (D)	Alexander B. Montgomery (D)	Asher G. Caruth (D)	John G. Carlisle (D)	William; Breckinridge (D)	James B. McCreary (D)	Thomas H. Paynter (D)	John H. Wilson (R)	Hugh F. Finley (R)
51st (1889–1891)	William Johnson; Stone (D)	William T. Ellis (D)	Isaac; Goodnight (D)	Alexander B. Montgomery (D)	Asher G. Caruth (D)	William W. Dickerson (D)	William; Breckinridge (D)	James B. McCreary (D)	Thomas H. Paynter (D)	John H. Wilson (R)	Hugh F. Finley (R)
52nd (1891–1893)	William Johnson; Stone (D)	William T. Ellis (D)	Isaac; Goodnight (D)	Alexander B. Montgomery (D)	Asher G. Caruth (D)	William W. Dickerson (D)	William; Breckinridge (D)	James B. McCreary (D)	Thomas H. Paynter (D)	John W. Kendall (D)	John H. Wilson (R)
52nd (1891–1893)	William Johnson; Stone (D)	William T. Ellis (D)	Isaac; Goodnight (D)	Alexander B. Montgomery (D)	Asher G. Caruth (D)	William W. Dickerson (D)	William; Breckinridge (D)	James B. McCreary (D)	Thomas H. Paynter (D)	Joseph M. Kendall (D)	John H. Wilson (R)
53rd (1893–1895)	William Johnson; Stone (D)	William T. Ellis (D)	Isaac; Goodnight (D)	Alexander B. Montgomery (D)	Asher G. Caruth (D)	Albert S. Berry (D)	William; Breckinridge (D)	James B. McCreary (D)	Thomas H. Paynter (D)	Marcus C. Lisle (D)	Silas; Adams (R)
53rd (1893–1895)	William Johnson; Stone (D)	William T. Ellis (D)	Isaac; Goodnight (D)	Alexander B. Montgomery (D)	Asher G. Caruth (D)	Albert S. Berry (D)	William; Breckinridge (D)	James B. McCreary (D)	Thomas H. Paynter (D)	William M. Beckner (D)	Silas; Adams (R)
54th (1895–1897)	John K. Hendrick (D)	John D. Clardy (D)	W. Godfrey; Hunter (R)	John W. Lewis (R)	Walter; Evans (R)	Albert S. Berry (D)	William C. Owens Jr. (D)	James B. McCreary (D)	Samuel J. Pugh (R)	Joseph M. Kendall (D)	David G. Colson (R)
54th (1895–1897)	John K. Hendrick (D)	John D. Clardy (D)	W. Godfrey; Hunter (R)	John W. Lewis (R)	Walter; Evans (R)	Albert S. Berry (D)	William C. Owens Jr. (D)	James B. McCreary (D)	Samuel J. Pugh (R)	Nathan T. Hopkins (R)	David G. Colson (R)
55th (1897–1899)	Charles K. Wheeler (D)	John D. Clardy (D)	John S. Rhea (D)	David; Highbaugh; Smith (D)	Walter; Evans (R)	Albert S. Berry (D)	Evan E. Settle (D)	George M. Davison (R)	Samuel J. Pugh (R)	Thomas Y. Fitzpatrick (D)	David G. Colson (R)
56th (1899–1901)	Charles K. Wheeler (D)	Henry D. Allen (D)	John S. Rhea (D)	David; Highbaugh; Smith (D)	Oscar; Turner (D)	Albert S. Berry (D)	Evan E. Settle (D)	George G. Gilbert (D)	Samuel J. Pugh (R)	Thomas Y. Fitzpatrick (D)	Vincent; Boreing (R)
56th (1899–1901)	Charles K. Wheeler (D)	Henry D. Allen (D)	John S. Rhea (D)	David; Highbaugh; Smith (D)	Oscar; Turner (D)	Albert S. Berry (D)	June W. Gayle (D)	George G. Gilbert (D)	Samuel J. Pugh (R)	Thomas Y. Fitzpatrick (D)	Vincent; Boreing (R)
57th (1901–1903)	Charles K. Wheeler (D)	Henry D. Allen (D)	John S. Rhea (D)	David; Highbaugh; Smith (D)	Harvey Samuel; Irwin (R)	Daniel Linn; Gooch (D)	South; Trimble (D)	George G. Gilbert (D)	James N. Kehoe (D)	James Bamford; White (D)	Vincent; Boreing (R)
57th (1901–1903)	Charles K. Wheeler (D)	Henry D. Allen (D)	J. McKenzie Moss (R)	David; Highbaugh; Smith (D)	Harvey Samuel; Irwin (R)	Daniel Linn; Gooch (D)	South; Trimble (D)	George G. Gilbert (D)	James N. Kehoe (D)	James Bamford; White (D)	Vincent; Boreing (R)
58th (1903–1905)	Ollie Murray; James (D)	Augustus Owsley; Stanley (D)	John S. Rhea (D)	David; Highbaugh; Smith (D)	J. Swagar; Sherley (D)	Daniel Linn; Gooch (D)	South; Trimble (D)	George G. Gilbert (D)	James N. Kehoe (D)	Francis A. Hopkins (D)	Vincent; Boreing (R)
58th (1903–1905)	Ollie Murray; James (D)	Augustus Owsley; Stanley (D)	John S. Rhea (D)	David; Highbaugh; Smith (D)	J. Swagar; Sherley (D)	Daniel Linn; Gooch (D)	South; Trimble (D)	George G. Gilbert (D)	James N. Kehoe (D)	Francis A. Hopkins (D)	W. Godfrey Hunter (R)
59th (1905–1907)	Ollie Murray; James (D)	Augustus Owsley; Stanley (D)	James M. Richardson (D)	David; Highbaugh; Smith (D)	J. Swagar; Sherley (D)	Joseph L. Rhinock (D)	South; Trimble (D)	George G. Gilbert (D)	Joseph B. Bennett (R)	Francis A. Hopkins (D)	Don C. Edwards (R)
60th (1907–1909)	Ollie Murray; James (D)	Augustus Owsley; Stanley (D)	Addison; James (R)	Ben; Johnson (D)	J. Swagar; Sherley (D)	Joseph L. Rhinock (D)	William P. Kimball (D)	Harvey; Helm (D)	Joseph B. Bennett (R)	John W. Langley (R)	Don C. Edwards (R)
61st (1909–1911)	Ollie Murray; James (D)	Augustus Owsley; Stanley (D)	Robert Y. Thomas Jr. (D)	Ben; Johnson (D)	J. Swagar; Sherley (D)	Joseph L. Rhinock (D)	J. Campbell; Cantrill (D)	Harvey; Helm (D)	Joseph B. Bennett (R)	John W. Langley (R)	Don C. Edwards (R)
62nd (1911–1913)	Ollie Murray; James (D)	Augustus Owsley; Stanley (D)	Robert Y. Thomas Jr. (D)	Ben; Johnson (D)	J. Swagar; Sherley (D)	Arthur B. Rouse (D)	J. Campbell; Cantrill (D)	Harvey; Helm (D)	William J. Fields (D)	John W. Langley (R)	Caleb; Powers (R)
63rd (1913–1915)	Alben W. Barkley (D)	Augustus Owsley; Stanley (D)	Robert Y. Thomas Jr. (D)	Ben; Johnson (D)	J. Swagar; Sherley (D)	Arthur B. Rouse (D)	J. Campbell; Cantrill (D)	Harvey; Helm (D)	William J. Fields (D)	John W. Langley (R)	Caleb; Powers (R)
64th (1915–1917)	Alben W. Barkley (D)	David Hayes; Kincheloe (D)	Robert Y. Thomas Jr. (D)	Ben; Johnson (D)	J. Swagar; Sherley (D)	Arthur B. Rouse (D)	J. Campbell; Cantrill (D)	Harvey; Helm (D)	William J. Fields (D)	John W. Langley (R)	Caleb; Powers (R)
65th (1917–1919)	Alben W. Barkley (D)	David Hayes; Kincheloe (D)	Robert Y. Thomas Jr. (D)	Ben; Johnson (D)	J. Swagar; Sherley (D)	Arthur B. Rouse (D)	J. Campbell; Cantrill (D)	Harvey; Helm (D)	William J. Fields (D)	John W. Langley (R)	Caleb; Powers (R)
66th (1919–1921)	Alben W. Barkley (D)	David Hayes; Kincheloe (D)	Robert Y. Thomas Jr. (D)	Ben; Johnson (D)	Charles F. Ogden (R)	Arthur B. Rouse (D)	J. Campbell; Cantrill (D)	Harvey; Helm (D)	William J. Fields (D)	John W. Langley (R)	John M. Robsion (R)
66th (1919–1921)	Alben W. Barkley (D)	David Hayes; Kincheloe (D)	Robert Y. Thomas Jr. (D)	Ben; Johnson (D)	Charles F. Ogden (R)	Arthur B. Rouse (D)	J. Campbell; Cantrill (D)	King Swope (R)	William J. Fields (D)	John W. Langley (R)	John M. Robsion (R)
67th (1921–1923)	Alben W. Barkley (D)	David Hayes; Kincheloe (D)	Robert Y. Thomas Jr. (D)	Ben; Johnson (D)	Charles F. Ogden (R)	Arthur B. Rouse (D)	J. Campbell; Cantrill (D)	Ralph; Gilbert (D)	William J. Fields (D)	John W. Langley (R)	John M. Robsion (R)
68th (1923–1925)	Alben W. Barkley (D)	David Hayes; Kincheloe (D)	Robert Y. Thomas Jr. (D)	Ben; Johnson (D)	Maurice; Thatcher (R)	Arthur B. Rouse (D)	J. Campbell; Cantrill (D)	Ralph; Gilbert (D)	William J. Fields (D)	John W. Langley (R)	John M. Robsion (R)
68th (1923–1925)	Alben W. Barkley (D)	David Hayes; Kincheloe (D)	Robert Y. Thomas Jr. (D)	Ben; Johnson (D)	Maurice; Thatcher (R)	Arthur B. Rouse (D)	Joseph W. Morris (D)	Ralph; Gilbert (D)	Fred M. Vinson (D)	John W. Langley (R)	John M. Robsion (R)
69th (1925–1927)	Alben W. Barkley (D)	David Hayes; Kincheloe (D)	Robert Y. Thomas Jr. (D)	Ben; Johnson (D)	Maurice; Thatcher (R)	Arthur B. Rouse (D)	Virgil; Chapman (D)	Ralph; Gilbert (D)	Fred M. Vinson (D)	John W. Langley (R)	John M. Robsion (R)
69th (1925–1927)	Alben W. Barkley (D)	David Hayes; Kincheloe (D)	John William; Moore (D)	Ben; Johnson (D)	Maurice; Thatcher (R)	Arthur B. Rouse (D)	Virgil; Chapman (D)	Ralph; Gilbert (D)	Fred M. Vinson (D)	Andrew J. Kirk (R)	John M. Robsion (R)
70th (1927–1929)	W. Voris; Gregory (D)	David Hayes; Kincheloe (D)	John William; Moore (D)	Henry D. Moorman (D)	Maurice; Thatcher (R)	Orie S. Ware (D)	Virgil; Chapman (D)	Ralph; Gilbert (D)	Fred M. Vinson (D)	Katherine G. Langley (R)	John M. Robsion (R)
71st (1929–1931)	W. Voris; Gregory (D)	David Hayes; Kincheloe (D)	Charles W. Roark (R)	John D. Craddock (R)	Maurice; Thatcher (R)	J. Lincoln; Newhall (R)	Robert E. Lee; Blackburn (R)	Lewis L. Walker (R)	Elva R. Kendall (R)	Katherine G. Langley (R)	John M. Robsion (R)
71st (1929–1931)	W. Voris; Gregory (D)	John Lloyd; Dorsey Jr. (D)	John William; Moore (D)	John D. Craddock (R)	Maurice; Thatcher (R)	J. Lincoln; Newhall (R)	Robert E. Lee; Blackburn (R)	Lewis L. Walker (R)	Elva R. Kendall (R)	Katherine G. Langley (R)	Charles Finley (R)
72nd (1931–1933)	W. Voris; Gregory (D)	Glover H. Cary (D)	John William; Moore (D)	Cap R. Carden (D)	Maurice; Thatcher (R)	Brent; Spence (D)	Virgil; Chapman (D)	Ralph; Gilbert (D)	Fred M. Vinson (D)	Andrew J. May (D)	Charles Finley (R)

=== 1933–1953: 9 seats ===
Following the 1930 census, Kentucky was apportioned 9 seats, all of which were elected at-large statewide for the 73rd Congress, after which it redistricted into 9 districts.

Congress	At-large seats elected statewide on general ticket								
73rd (1933–1935)	W. Voris; Gregory (D)	Glover H. Cary (D)	Finley; Hamilton (D)	Cap R. Carden (D)	Brent; Spence (D)	Virgil; Chapman (D)	Andrew J. May (D)	Fred M. Vinson (D)	John Y. Brown Sr. (D)
Congress	District								
Congress	1st	2nd	3rd	4th	5th	6th	7th	8th	9th
74th (1935–1937)	W. Voris; Gregory (D)	Glover H. Cary (D)	Emmet; O'Neal (D)	Cap R. Carden (D)	Brent; Spence (D)	Virgil; Chapman (D)	Andrew J. May (D)	Fred M. Vinson (D)	John M. Robsion (R)
74th (1935–1937)	vacant	Glover H. Cary (D)	Emmet; O'Neal (D)	Edward W. Creal (D)	Brent; Spence (D)	Virgil; Chapman (D)	Andrew J. May (D)	Fred M. Vinson (D)	John M. Robsion (R)
75th (1937–1939)	Noble J. Gregory (D)	Beverly M. Vincent (D)	Emmet; O'Neal (D)	Edward W. Creal (D)	Brent; Spence (D)	Virgil; Chapman (D)	Andrew J. May (D)	Fred M. Vinson (D)	John M. Robsion (R)
75th (1937–1939)	Noble J. Gregory (D)	Beverly M. Vincent (D)	Emmet; O'Neal (D)	Edward W. Creal (D)	Brent; Spence (D)	Virgil; Chapman (D)	Andrew J. May (D)	Joe B. Bates (D)	John M. Robsion (R)
76th (1939–1941)	Noble J. Gregory (D)	Beverly M. Vincent (D)	Emmet; O'Neal (D)	Edward W. Creal (D)	Brent; Spence (D)	Virgil; Chapman (D)	Andrew J. May (D)	Joe B. Bates (D)	John M. Robsion (R)
77th (1941–1943)	Noble J. Gregory (D)	Beverly M. Vincent (D)	Emmet; O'Neal (D)	Edward W. Creal (D)	Brent; Spence (D)	Virgil; Chapman (D)	Andrew J. May (D)	Joe B. Bates (D)	John M. Robsion (R)
78th (1943–1945)	Noble J. Gregory (D)	Beverly M. Vincent (D)	Emmet; O'Neal (D)	Edward W. Creal (D)	Brent; Spence (D)	Virgil; Chapman (D)	Andrew J. May (D)	Joe B. Bates (D)	John M. Robsion (R)
78th (1943–1945)	Noble J. Gregory (D)	Beverly M. Vincent (D)	Emmet; O'Neal (D)	Chester Carrier (R)	Brent; Spence (D)	Virgil; Chapman (D)	Andrew J. May (D)	Joe B. Bates (D)	John M. Robsion (R)
79th (1945–1947)	Noble J. Gregory (D)	Earle Clements (D)	Emmet; O'Neal (D)	Frank Chelf (D)	Brent; Spence (D)	Virgil; Chapman (D)	Andrew J. May (D)	Joe B. Bates (D)	John M. Robsion (R)
80th (1947–1949)	Noble J. Gregory (D)	Earle Clements (D)	Thurston; Morton (R)	Frank Chelf (D)	Brent; Spence (D)	Virgil; Chapman (D)	Wendell H. Meade (R)	Joe B. Bates (D)	John M. Robsion (R)
80th (1947–1949)	Noble J. Gregory (D)	John A. Whitaker (D)	Thurston; Morton (R)	Frank Chelf (D)	Brent; Spence (D)	Virgil; Chapman (D)	Wendell H. Meade (R)	Joe B. Bates (D)	William Lewis (R)
81st (1949–1951)	Noble J. Gregory (D)	John A. Whitaker (D)	Thurston; Morton (R)	Frank Chelf (D)	Brent; Spence (D)	Thomas R. Underwood (D)	Carl D. Perkins (D)	Joe B. Bates (D)	James S. Golden (R)
82nd (1951–1953)	Noble J. Gregory (D)	John A. Whitaker (D)	Thurston; Morton (R)	Frank Chelf (D)	Brent; Spence (D)	John C. Watts (D)	Carl D. Perkins (D)	Joe B. Bates (D)	James S. Golden (R)
82nd (1951–1953)	Noble J. Gregory (D)	Garrett Withers (D)	Thurston; Morton (R)	Frank Chelf (D)	Brent; Spence (D)	John C. Watts (D)	Carl D. Perkins (D)	Joe B. Bates (D)	James S. Golden (R)

=== 1953–1963: 8 seats ===
Following the 1950 census, Kentucky was apportioned 8 seats.

Congress	District							
Congress	1st	2nd	3rd	4th	5th	6th	7th	8th
83rd (1953–1955)	Noble J. Gregory (D)	Garrett Withers (D)	John M. Robsion Jr. (R)	Frank; Chelf (D)	Brent; Spence (D)	John C. Watts (D)	Carl D. Perkins (D)	James S. Golden (R)
83rd (1953–1955)	Noble J. Gregory (D)	William Natcher (D)	John M. Robsion Jr. (R)	Frank; Chelf (D)	Brent; Spence (D)	John C. Watts (D)	Carl D. Perkins (D)	James S. Golden (R)
84th (1955–1957)	Noble J. Gregory (D)	William Natcher (D)	John M. Robsion Jr. (R)	Frank; Chelf (D)	Brent; Spence (D)	John C. Watts (D)	Carl D. Perkins (D)	Eugene; Siler (R)
85th (1957–1959)	Noble J. Gregory (D)	William Natcher (D)	John M. Robsion Jr. (R)	Frank; Chelf (D)	Brent; Spence (D)	John C. Watts (D)	Carl D. Perkins (D)	Eugene; Siler (R)
86th (1959–1961)	Frank; Stubblefield (D)	William Natcher (D)	Frank W. Burke (D)	Frank; Chelf (D)	Brent; Spence (D)	John C. Watts (D)	Carl D. Perkins (D)	Eugene; Siler (R)
87th (1961–1963)	Frank; Stubblefield (D)	William Natcher (D)	Frank W. Burke (D)	Frank; Chelf (D)	Brent; Spence (D)	John C. Watts (D)	Carl D. Perkins (D)	Eugene; Siler (R)

=== 1963–1993: 7 seats ===
Following the 1960 census, Kentucky was apportioned 7 seats.

Congress	District						
Congress	1st	2nd	3rd	4th	5th	6th	7th
88th (1963–1965)	Frank; Stubblefield (D)	William; Natcher (D)	Gene Snyder (R)	Frank Chelf (D)	Eugene Siler (R)	John C. Watts (D)	Carl D. Perkins (D)
89th (1965–1967)	Frank; Stubblefield (D)	William; Natcher (D)	Charlie Farnsley (D)	Frank Chelf (D)	Tim Lee Carter (R)	John C. Watts (D)	Carl D. Perkins (D)
90th (1967–1969)	Frank; Stubblefield (D)	William; Natcher (D)	William Cowger (R)	Gene Snyder (R)	Tim Lee Carter (R)	John C. Watts (D)	Carl D. Perkins (D)
91st (1969–1971)	Frank; Stubblefield (D)	William; Natcher (D)	William Cowger (R)	Gene Snyder (R)	Tim Lee Carter (R)	John C. Watts (D)	Carl D. Perkins (D)
92nd (1971–1973)	Frank; Stubblefield (D)	William; Natcher (D)	Romano; Mazzoli (D)	Gene Snyder (R)	Tim Lee Carter (R)	John C. Watts (D)	Carl D. Perkins (D)
92nd (1971–1973)	Frank; Stubblefield (D)	William; Natcher (D)	Romano; Mazzoli (D)	Gene Snyder (R)	Tim Lee Carter (R)	William Curlin (D)	Carl D. Perkins (D)
93rd (1973–1975)	Frank; Stubblefield (D)	William; Natcher (D)	Romano; Mazzoli (D)	Gene Snyder (R)	Tim Lee Carter (R)	John B. Breckinridge (D)	Carl D. Perkins (D)
94th (1975–1977)	Carroll; Hubbard (D)	William; Natcher (D)	Romano; Mazzoli (D)	Gene Snyder (R)	Tim Lee Carter (R)	John B. Breckinridge (D)	Carl D. Perkins (D)
95th (1977–1979)	Carroll; Hubbard (D)	William; Natcher (D)	Romano; Mazzoli (D)	Gene Snyder (R)	Tim Lee Carter (R)	John B. Breckinridge (D)	Carl D. Perkins (D)
96th (1979–1981)	Carroll; Hubbard (D)	William; Natcher (D)	Romano; Mazzoli (D)	Gene Snyder (R)	Tim Lee Carter (R)	Larry J. Hopkins (R)	Carl D. Perkins (D)
97th (1981–1983)	Carroll; Hubbard (D)	William; Natcher (D)	Romano; Mazzoli (D)	Gene Snyder (R)	Hal Rogers (R)	Larry J. Hopkins (R)	Carl D. Perkins (D)
98th (1983–1985)	Carroll; Hubbard (D)	William; Natcher (D)	Romano; Mazzoli (D)	Gene Snyder (R)	Hal Rogers (R)	Larry J. Hopkins (R)	Carl D. Perkins (D)
98th (1983–1985)	Carroll; Hubbard (D)	William; Natcher (D)	Romano; Mazzoli (D)	Gene Snyder (R)	Hal Rogers (R)	Larry J. Hopkins (R)	Chris Perkins (D)
99th (1985–1987)	Carroll; Hubbard (D)	William; Natcher (D)	Romano; Mazzoli (D)	Gene Snyder (R)	Hal Rogers (R)	Larry J. Hopkins (R)	Chris Perkins (D)
100th (1987–1989)	Carroll; Hubbard (D)	William; Natcher (D)	Romano; Mazzoli (D)	Jim Bunning (R)	Hal Rogers (R)	Larry J. Hopkins (R)	Chris Perkins (D)
101st (1989–1991)	Carroll; Hubbard (D)	William; Natcher (D)	Romano; Mazzoli (D)	Jim Bunning (R)	Hal Rogers (R)	Larry J. Hopkins (R)	Chris Perkins (D)
102nd (1991–1993)	Carroll; Hubbard (D)	William; Natcher (D)	Romano; Mazzoli (D)	Jim Bunning (R)	Hal Rogers (R)	Larry J. Hopkins (R)	Chris Perkins (D)

=== 1993–present: 6 seats ===
Following the 1990 census, Kentucky was apportioned 6 seats.

Congress	1st district	2nd district	3rd district	4th district	5th district	6th district
103rd (1993–1995)	Tom Barlow (D)	William Natcher (D)	Romano Mazzoli (D)	Jim Bunning (R)	Hal Rogers (R)	Scotty Baesler (D)
103rd (1993–1995)	Tom Barlow (D)	Ron Lewis (R)	Romano Mazzoli (D)	Jim Bunning (R)	Hal Rogers (R)	Scotty Baesler (D)
104th (1995–1997)	Ed Whitfield (R)	Ron Lewis (R)	Mike Ward (D)	Jim Bunning (R)	Hal Rogers (R)	Scotty Baesler (D)
105th (1997–1999)	Ed Whitfield (R)	Ron Lewis (R)	Anne Northup (R)	Jim Bunning (R)	Hal Rogers (R)	Scotty Baesler (D)
106th (1999–2001)	Ed Whitfield (R)	Ron Lewis (R)	Anne Northup (R)	Ken Lucas (D)	Hal Rogers (R)	Ernie Fletcher (R)
107th (2001–2003)	Ed Whitfield (R)	Ron Lewis (R)	Anne Northup (R)	Ken Lucas (D)	Hal Rogers (R)	Ernie Fletcher (R)
108th (2003–2005)	Ed Whitfield (R)	Ron Lewis (R)	Anne Northup (R)	Ken Lucas (D)	Hal Rogers (R)	Ernie Fletcher (R)
108th (2003–2005)	Ed Whitfield (R)	Ron Lewis (R)	Anne Northup (R)	Ken Lucas (D)	Hal Rogers (R)	Ben Chandler (D)
109th (2005–2007)	Ed Whitfield (R)	Ron Lewis (R)	Anne Northup (R)	Geoff Davis (R)	Hal Rogers (R)	Ben Chandler (D)
110th (2007–2009)	Ed Whitfield (R)	Ron Lewis (R)	John Yarmuth (D)	Geoff Davis (R)	Hal Rogers (R)	Ben Chandler (D)
111th (2009–2011)	Ed Whitfield (R)	Brett Guthrie (R)	John Yarmuth (D)	Geoff Davis (R)	Hal Rogers (R)	Ben Chandler (D)
112th (2011–2013)	Ed Whitfield (R)	Brett Guthrie (R)	John Yarmuth (D)	Geoff Davis (R)	Hal Rogers (R)	Ben Chandler (D)
112th (2011–2013)	Ed Whitfield (R)	Brett Guthrie (R)	John Yarmuth (D)	Thomas Massie (R)	Hal Rogers (R)	Ben Chandler (D)
113th (2013–2015)	Ed Whitfield (R)	Brett Guthrie (R)	John Yarmuth (D)	Thomas Massie (R)	Hal Rogers (R)	Andy Barr (R)
114th (2015–2017)	Ed Whitfield (R)	Brett Guthrie (R)	John Yarmuth (D)	Thomas Massie (R)	Hal Rogers (R)	Andy Barr (R)
114th (2015–2017)	James Comer (R)	Brett Guthrie (R)	John Yarmuth (D)	Thomas Massie (R)	Hal Rogers (R)	Andy Barr (R)
115th (2017–2019)	James Comer (R)	Brett Guthrie (R)	John Yarmuth (D)	Thomas Massie (R)	Hal Rogers (R)	Andy Barr (R)
116th (2019–2021)	James Comer (R)	Brett Guthrie (R)	John Yarmuth (D)	Thomas Massie (R)	Hal Rogers (R)	Andy Barr (R)
117th (2021–2023)	James Comer (R)	Brett Guthrie (R)	John Yarmuth (D)	Thomas Massie (R)	Hal Rogers (R)	Andy Barr (R)
118th (2023–2025)	James Comer (R)	Brett Guthrie (R)	Morgan McGarvey (D)	Thomas Massie (R)	Hal Rogers (R)	Andy Barr (R)
119th (2025–2027)	James Comer (R)	Brett Guthrie (R)	Morgan McGarvey (D)	Thomas Massie (R)	Hal Rogers (R)	Andy Barr (R)
120th (2027–2029)	James Comer (R)	Brett Guthrie (R)	Morgan McGarvey (D)	Ed Gallrein (D)	Hal Rogers (R)	Zach Dembo (D)

== Key ==
Anti-Administration (AA)
Democratic (D)
Democratic-Republican (DR)
Federalist (F)
Pro-Administration (PA)
Independent Democrat (ID)
Jacksonian (J)
Know Nothing (KN)
National Republican (NR)
Opposition Southern (O)
Republican (R)
Union (U)
Unconditional Union (UU)
Whig (W)

== See also ==
- List of United States congressional districts
- Kentucky's congressional districts
- Political party strength in Kentucky
