= John W. Caldwell =

American politician

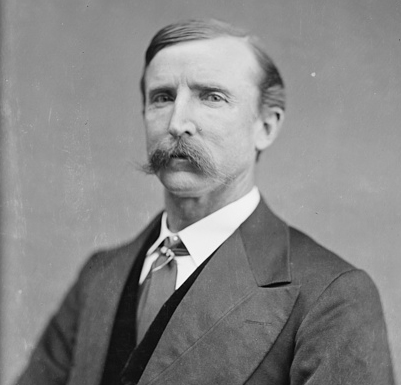

Member of the U.S. House of Representatives from Kentucky's 3rd district
- In office March 4, 1877 – March 3, 1883
- Preceded by: Charles W. Milliken
- Succeeded by: John Edward Halsell

Personal details
- Born: January 15, 1837 Russellville, Kentucky
- Died: July 4, 1903 (aged 66) Russellville, Kentucky
- Resting place: Maple Grove Cemetery, Russellville, Kentucky
- Party: Democratic
- Spouse: Sallie J. Barclay
- Education: Bethel College; University of Louisville
- Profession: Lawyer

Military service
- Allegiance: Confederate States of America
- Branch/service: Confederate States Army
- Rank: Colonel
- Unit: 9th Kentucky Infantry Regiment
- Battles/wars: American Civil War

John William Caldwell (January 15, 1837 – July 4, 1903) was a U.S. representative from Kentucky.

== Early life and family ==
John W. Caldwell was born in Russellville, Kentucky, on January 15, 1837. He was the son of Austin and Louisa (Harrison) Caldwell. Austin Caldwell died in 1843, leaving John Caldwell as his only living child. With the duties of caring for his father's estate, Caldwell was only able to attend the common schools of Logan and Christian Counties until age fourteen. In 1850, he moved with his uncle, Dr. Robert Peyton Harrison, to Texas, where he worked on a farm, as a clerk, and as a surveyor.

At age nineteen, Caldwell returned to Kentucky. He studied law with William Morton, a well-known lawyer in his family. In 1856, he matriculated to the University of Louisville School of Law, completing a junior year course of study with honors. He graduated from the university in 1857, was admitted to the bar in 1858, and commenced practice in Russellville, Kentucky.

Caldwell married Sallie J. Barclay, and the couple had one son and two daughters.

== Civil War service ==
Although he opposed secession, Caldwell volunteered as a private in the Confederate States Army in 1861. He was immediately elected captain of the "Logan Grays", a Confederate company being recruited in Logan County. When Confederate forces under Simon Bolivar Buckner entered Kentucky, Caldwell led the Grays to Bowling Green, where they became Company A of the 9th Kentucky Infantry under John C. Breckinridge. After Albert Sidney Johnson's retreat from Bowling Green, Caldwell commanded the 9th Kentucky until relieved by Colonel Thomas H. Hunt on his return from New Orleans, Louisiana.

At the Battle of Shiloh, Caldwell received several wounds, including a badly broken left arm. Sixty-five percent of his company was killed or wounded in the battle. Following the battle, he was promoted to major, and when the 9th Kentucky was reorganized six weeks later, he was elected its lieutenant colonel. Thomas H. Hunt resigned his commission in 1863, and Caldwell was promoted to colonel and given command. He sometimes also commanded the Orphan Brigade.

Caldwell again broke his left arm at the Battle of Chickamauga. Because of this, the Board of Army Surgeons offered him a medical retirement, but he declined, rejoining his regiment in Dalton, Georgia, two weeks later. At the end of the war, he surrendered his forces at Washington, Georgia, and was paroled as a prisoner of war on May 6, 1865.

== Political career ==
Caldwell resumed the practice of law in Russellville. He was elected judge of the Logan County Court in August 1866 and reelected in 1870, serving eight years. Two years after his retirement from the bench, he was elected as a Democrat to represent the Third District in the U.S. House of Representatives. He served in the Forty-fifth, Forty-sixth, and Forty-seventh Congresses (March 4, 1877 – March 3, 1883). He was known as an advocate of home rule, tariff reform, hard money, and conservatism in public expenditures. Due to ill health, he declined to be a candidate for reelection although he faced no Republican opposition for the seat.

== Later life and death ==
After his time in Congress, Caldwell did not return to his legal practice, but became president of the Logan County Bank. He died in Russellville on July 4, 1903, and was interred in Maple Grove Cemetery.

U.S. House of Representatives
Preceded by Charles W. Milliken	United States Representative, Kentucky's 3rd district 1877–1883	Succeeded by John E. Halsell
