= Garrard College =

College in Lancaster, Kentucky

Garrard College was located in Lancaster, Kentucky. It accepted female boarders and also taught males. It had a music program. It was eventually purchased by the commissioners for a grade school in 1895.

Female students attended Garrard Female College. Its buildings were later used by Lancaster High School.

Garrard College had a music program led by Raphael Koester. From 1885 until 1891 the school's music program gave a public performance at the county courthouse.

Charles Hoeing taught Latin and Greek at the college from 1890 until 1893.

J.C. Gordon was the school's president.

Alumni include Lewis L. Walker and Internal Revenue official Millard F. West.

- James Nathan Elliott
