= Lewis L. Walker =

American politician

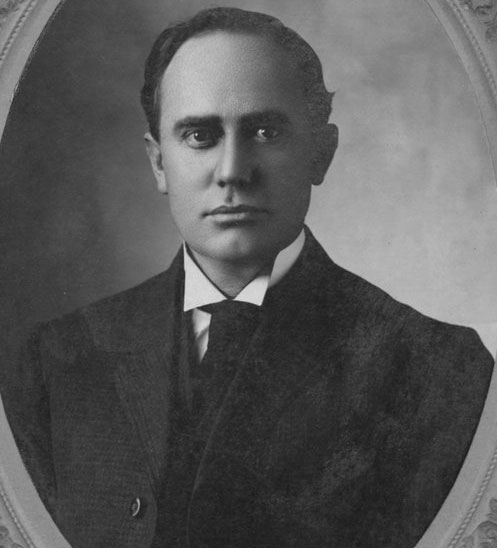
- A portrait of Walker in 1910

Member of the U.S. House of Representatives from Kentucky's 8th district
- In office March 4, 1929 – March 3, 1931
- Preceded by: Ralph Waldo Emerson Gilbert
- Succeeded by: Ralph Waldo Emerson Gilbert

Personal details
- Born: Lewis Leavell Walker; February 15, 1873 Lancaster, Kentucky
- Died: June 30, 1944 (aged 71) Lancaster, Kentucky
- Resting place: Lancaster Cemetery
- Party: Republican
- Education: Central University (now Eastern Kentucky University)
- Profession: Lawyer

Lewis Leavell Walker (February 15, 1873 – June 30, 1944) was a U.S. representative from Kentucky.

Born in Lancaster, Kentucky, Walker attended Lancaster Academy, Garrard College in Lancaster, Kentucky, and Central University, Richmond, Kentucky. He studied law. He was admitted to the bar in 1894 and commenced practice in Lancaster, Kentucky. He also engaged in banking. He served as prosecuting attorney of Garrard County in 1901. Walker served as city attorney of Lancaster 1907–1910. He served as trustee of the University of Kentucky, at Lexington, Kentucky from 1908 to 1915. He served as judge of the 13th judicial district of Kentucky in 1910 and 1911.

Walker was elected as a Republican to the Seventy-first Congress (March 4, 1929 – March 3, 1931). He was not a candidate for renomination in 1930. Walker was preceded and succeeded in his congressional seat by the same person, Democrat Ralph Waldo Emerson Gilbert.

Walker continued the practice of law in Lancaster, Kentucky, until his death there on June 30, 1944. He was interred in Lancaster Cemetery.

U.S. House of Representatives
Preceded by Ralph Waldo Emerson Gilbert	U.S. Representative, Kentucky's 8th district March 4, 1929-March 3, 1931	Succeeded by Ralph Waldo Emerson Gilbert
