= Joseph M. Kendall =

American politician

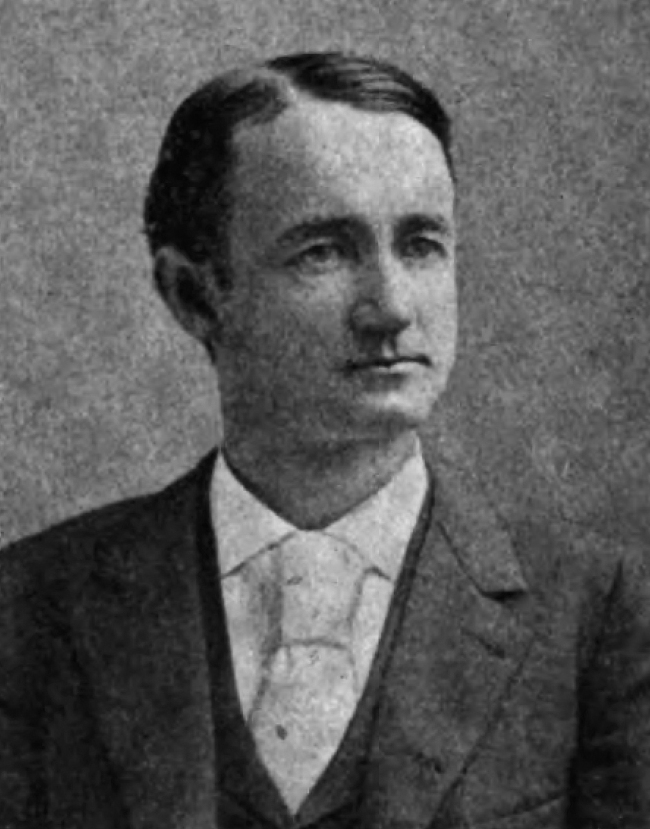

Member of the U.S. House of Representatives from Kentucky's 10th district
- In office April 21, 1892 – March 3, 1893
- Preceded by: John W. Kendall
- Succeeded by: Marcus C. Lisle
- In office March 4, 1895 – February 18, 1897
- Preceded by: William Beckner
- Succeeded by: Nathan T. Hopkins

Personal details
- Born: May 12, 1863 West Liberty, Kentucky
- Died: November 5, 1933 (aged 70) West Liberty, Kentucky
- Resting place: Barber Cemetery
- Party: Democratic
- Relations: Son of John W. Kendall
- Education: University of Kentucky; University of Michigan
- Profession: Lawyer

Joseph Morgan Kendall (May 12, 1863 – November 5, 1933) was an American lawyer and politician who served two terms as a U.S. representative from Kentucky from 1892 to 1893, then again from 1895 to 1897. He was the son of John Wilkerson Kendall.

== Biography ==
Born in West Liberty, Kentucky, Kendall received his early education from private tutors and in the public schools. He attended the State College of Kentucky and the University of Michigan at Ann Arbor. He was examined by the court of appeals of Kentucky and admitted to the practice of law before he was of age. He settled in Prestonsburg, Kentucky.

He was appointed to serve as the Clerk of the House of Representatives in the Forty-ninth and Fiftieth Congresses.

=== Congress ===
Kendall was himself elected as a Democrat to the Fifty-second Congress to fill the vacancy caused by the death of his father, Congressman John W. Kendall, and served from April 21, 1892, to March 3, 1893. He declined to be a candidate for renomination in 1892 due to ill health. Presented credentials as a Member-elect to the Fifty-fourth Congress and served from March 4, 1895, to February 18, 1897, when he was succeeded by Nathan T. Hopkins, who had contested his election.

=== Later career and death ===
He resumed the practice of law in West Liberty, Kentucky. He served as delegate to all Democratic State conventions 1884–1933. He also engaged in agricultural pursuits near Boonsboro, Kentucky.

He died in West Liberty, Kentucky, November 5, 1933. He was interred in Barber Cemetery.

U.S. House of Representatives
Preceded by John H. Wilson	Member of the U.S. House of Representatives from Kentucky's 10th congressional district April 21, 1892 – March 3, 1893 (obsolete district)	Succeeded by Marcus C. Lisle
Preceded by William M. Beckner	Member of the U.S. House of Representatives from Kentucky's 10th congressional district March 4, 1895 – February 18, 1897 (obsolete district)	Succeeded by Nathan T. Hopkins
