= Charles W. Milliken =

American politician

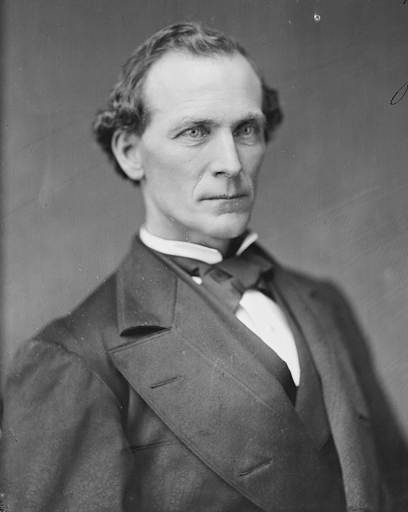

Member of the U.S. House of Representatives from Kentucky's 3rd district
- In office March 4, 1873 – March 3, 1877
- Preceded by: Joseph Horace Lewis
- Succeeded by: John W. Caldwell

Personal details
- Born: August 15, 1827 Calloway County, Kentucky
- Died: October 16, 1915 (aged 88) Franklin, Kentucky
- Resting place: Greenlawn Cemetery
- Party: Democratic
- Education: Wirt College
- Profession: Lawyer

Charles William Milliken (August 15, 1827 – October 16, 1915) was a U.S. representative from Kentucky.

Born near Murray, Kentucky, Milliken moved with his parents to Simpson County, Kentucky, in 1829 and settled near Franklin. He pursued preparatory studies, and was graduated from Wirt College, Sumner County, Tennessee, in 1849. He studied law. He was admitted to the bar in 1850 and commenced practice in Franklin, Kentucky. He served as prosecuting attorney of Simpson County 1857–1862. Commonwealth attorney of the fourth judicial district of Kentucky from 1867 until his resignation on February 24, 1872.

Milliken was elected as a Democrat to the Forty-third and Forty-fourth Congresses (March 4, 1873 – March 3, 1877). He served as chairman of the Committee on Public Expenditures (Forty-fourth Congress). He declined to be a candidate for reelection in 1876 to the Forty-fifth Congress. He resumed the practice of law. Referee in bankruptcy for the Bowling Green (Kentucky) district and served from September 28, 1907, until his death in Franklin, Kentucky, October 16, 1915. He was interred in Greenlawn Cemetery.

U.S. House of Representatives
Preceded by Joseph H. Lewis	United States Representative, Kentucky's 3rd district 1873–1877	Succeeded by John W. Caldwell
