= John E. Halsell =

American politician (1826–1899)

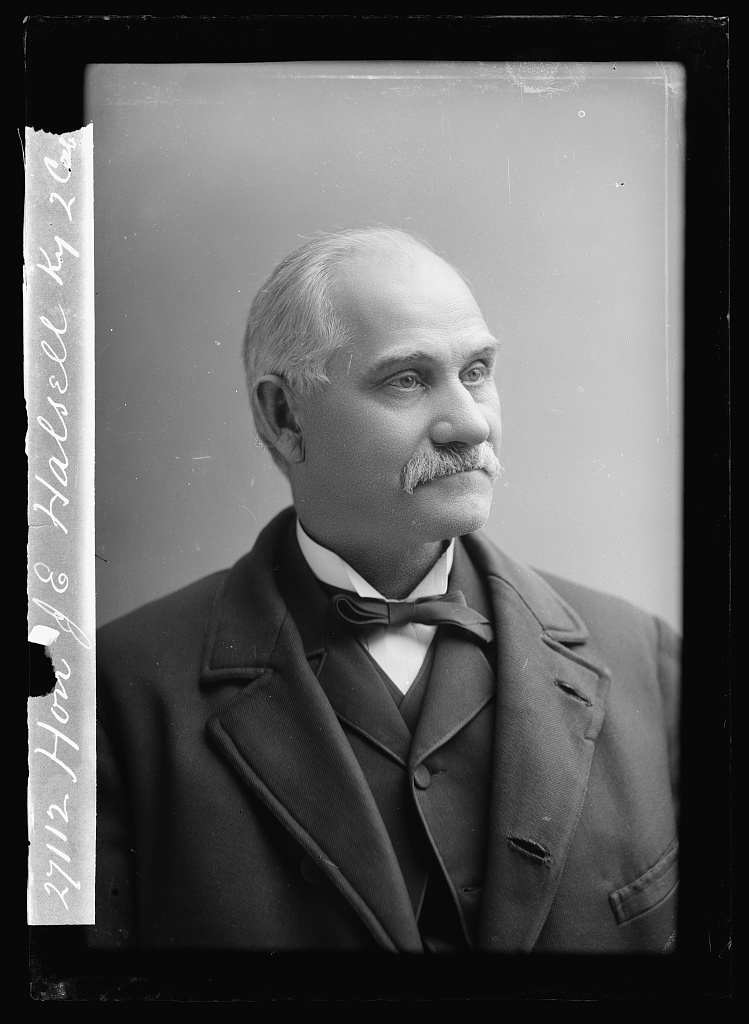

Mayor of Bowling Green, Kentucky
- In office December 5, 1888 – December 5, 1889

Member of the U.S. House of Representatives from Kentucky's 3rd district
- In office March 4, 1883 – March 3, 1887
- Preceded by: John W. Caldwell
- Succeeded by: W. Godfrey Hunter

Personal details
- Born: John Edward Halsell; September 11, 1826 Bowling Green, Kentucky, U.S.
- Died: December 26, 1899 (aged 73) Fort Worth, Texas, U.S.
- Resting place: Fair View Cemetery, Bowling Green, Kentucky, U.S.
- Party: Democratic
- Education: Cumberland University
- Profession: Politician, lawyer

John Edward Halsell (September 11, 1826 – December 26, 1899) was a U.S. representative from Kentucky.

Born near Bowling Green, Kentucky, Halsell attended the common schools at Rich Pond, Kentucky, and Cumberland University, Lebanon, Tennessee. He studied law. He was admitted to the bar in 1856 and commenced practice in Bowling Green. He served as prosecuting attorney of Warren County for four years.

Halsell was elected circuit judge of the fourth judicial district of Kentucky in 1870.

Halsell was elected as a Democrat to the Forty-eighth and Forty-ninth Congresses (March 4, 1883 – March 3, 1887). He served as chairman of the Committee on Private Land Claims (Forty-ninth Congress). He was an unsuccessful candidate for renomination. He resumed the practice of law. He served as mayor of Bowling Green from December 5, 1888, to December 5, 1889. He moved to Fort Worth, Texas, and continued the practice of law. He died in Fort Worth, December 26, 1899. He was interred in Fair View Cemetery, Bowling Green, Kentucky.

U.S. House of Representatives
Preceded by John W. Caldwell	United States Representative, Kentucky's 3rd district 1883–1887	Succeeded by W. Godfrey Hunter
