= William J. Graves =

American politician

William Graves
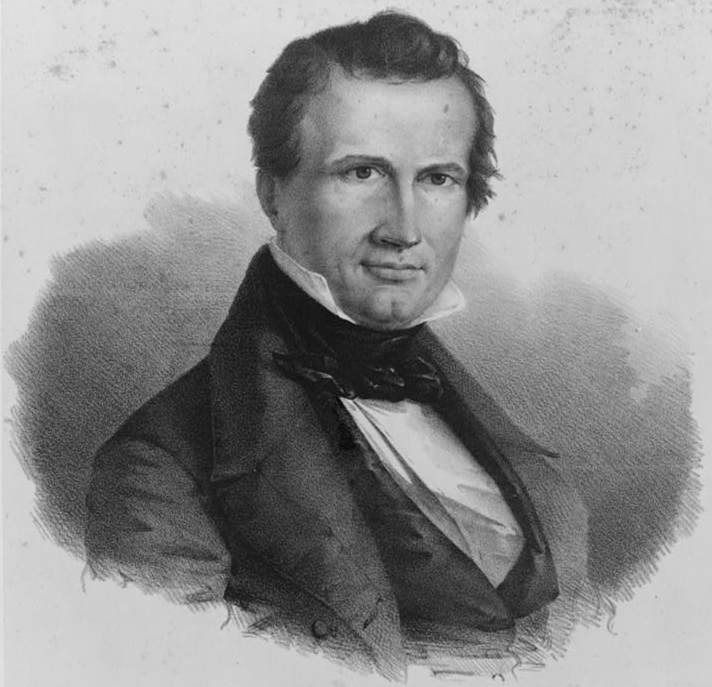

Member of the U.S. House of Representatives from Kentucky's 8th district
- In office March 4, 1835 – March 4, 1841
- Preceded by: Patrick H. Pope
- Succeeded by: James Sprigg

Personal details
- Born: William Jordan Graves; 1805 New Castle, Kentucky, U.S.
- Died: September 27, 1848 (aged 42–43) Louisville, Kentucky, U.S.
- Party: National Republican (Before 1836); Whig (1836–1848)

William Jordan Graves (1805 – September 27, 1848) was a U.S. representative from Kentucky.

Graves was born in New Castle, Kentucky, and pursued an academic course early in life, choosing to study law. He was admitted to the bar and practiced law in Kentucky before serving as member of the State house of representatives in 1834. Graves was elected as an Anti-Jacksonian to the Twenty-fourth Congress and reelected as a Whig to the Twenty-fifth, and Twenty-sixth Congresses (March 4, 1835 – March 3, 1841).

He engaged in a duel at the Bladensburg dueling grounds on the Marlboro Road in Maryland with Congressman Jonathan Cilley in 1838. Graves was a stand-in for New York newspaper editor James Watson Webb, whom Cilley had called corrupt. Cilley was inexperienced with guns, and Graves was a crack shot with a pistol. As the challenged party, Cilley had the choice of weapons; he selected rifles at 80 yards, a distance that would negate Graves' shooting skill. The actual distance at the first exchange of shots was later determined to be 94 yards; both participants missed. They then agreed to shorten the distance and fire again; again both Graves and Cilley missed. After again shortening the distance, on the third fire Graves hit Cilley in the femoral artery; he bled to death in ninety seconds. This duel prompted passage of a congressional act of February 20, 1839, prohibiting the issuing or accepting of a challenge within the District of Columbia, even if the duel was to be fought outside the district.

He was not a candidate for renomination in 1840. He was again a member of the State house of representatives in 1843. He died in Louisville, Kentucky, September 27, 1848. He was interred in the private burial grounds at his former residence in Henry County, Kentucky.

U.S. House of Representatives
| Preceded by Patrick H. Pope | Member of the U.S. House of Representatives from Kentucky's 8th congressional district 1835–1841 | Succeeded by James Sprigg |
