= Francis A. Hopkins =

American politician (1853–1918)

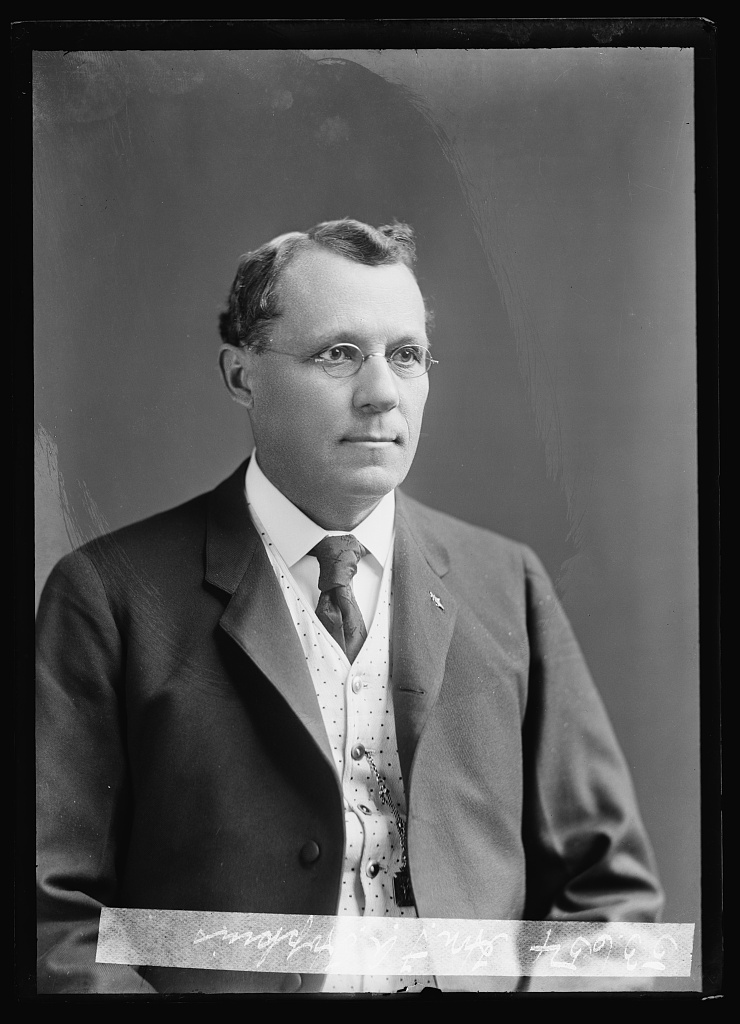

Member of the U.S. House of Representatives from Kentucky's 10th district
- In office March 4, 1903 – March 3, 1907
- Preceded by: James Bamford White
- Succeeded by: John W. Langley

Personal details
- Born: May 27, 1853 Jeffersonville, Virginia
- Died: June 5, 1918 (aged 65) Prestonsburg, Kentucky
- Party: Democratic
- Profession: Lawyer
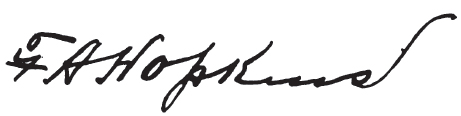
- Signature

Francis Alexander Hopkins (May 27, 1853 – June 5, 1918) was an American lawyer and politician who served two terms as a U.S. representative from Kentucky from 1903 to 1907.

== Biography ==
Born in Jeffersonville, Virginia, Hopkins attended the public schools and the Tazewell High School. He studied law. He was admitted to the bar in November 1874 and commenced practice in Prestonsburg, Kentucky. He also engaged in agricultural pursuits. He served as commissioner of common schools 1882–1884. He served as member of the State constitutional convention in 1890. According to the 1903 Congressional Directory, "in August, 1890, [Hopkins] was elected as a delegate to represent the counties of Floyd, Knott, and Letcher in the convention which made and published the present constitution of Kentucky".

=== Congress ===
Hopkins was elected as a Democrat to the Fifty-eighth and Fifty-ninth Congresses (March 4, 1903 – March 3, 1907). He was an unsuccessful candidate for reelection in 1906 to the Sixtieth Congress. He served as delegate to the Democratic National Convention in 1916.

=== Later career and death ===
He resumed agricultural pursuits and the practice of law in Prestonsburg, Kentucky, and died there on June 5, 1918. He was interred in Davidson Cemetery.

U.S. House of Representatives
Preceded by James B. White	Member of the U.S. House of Representatives from Kentucky's 10th congressional district March 4, 1903 – March 3, 1907 (obsolete district)	Succeeded by John W. Langley
