= John Blades Clarke =

American politician (1833–1911)

Member of the U.S. House of Representatives from Kentucky's 10th district
- In office March 4, 1875 – March 3, 1879
- Preceded by: John Duncan Young
- Succeeded by: Elijah Phister

Personal details
- Born: April 14, 1833 Brooksville, Kentucky
- Died: May 23, 1911 (aged 78) Brooksville, Kentucky
- Resting place: Mount Zion Cemetery
- Party: Democratic
- Spouse: Cordelia A. Robertson
- Profession: Lawyer

John Blades Clarke (April 14, 1833 – May 23, 1911) was a U.S. representative from Kentucky.

== Early life and family ==
John B. Clarke was born in Brooksville, Kentucky, on April 14, 1833. He was the son of John and Mary (Blades) Clarke.

Clarke studied under Harvey King in the common schools of Augusta, Kentucky, and at Augusta (Kentucky) College. In 1851, he left school to return to his father's farm. During the winters of 1851 and 1852, he taught at a local school. For three years, he studied law under Judge Joseph Doniphan of Augusta. After examination by two local judges, he was admitted to the bar on April 20, 1854.

Clarke married Cordelia A. Robertson, and the couple had six children – Bion Clarke, William R. Clarke, John B. Clarke, Cordelia Clark, Harry Clarke, and Clarence Clarke. After the marriage, the family moved to Rockport, Indiana, where Clarke commenced practice in January 1885. By September 1855, Clarke's wife had become ill, and the family returned Brooksville on December 10, 1855, where Clarke continued the practice of law.

== Political career ==
Clarke was elected prosecuting attorney of Bracken County in 1858, serving until 1862. In 1867, he was elected to the Kentucky Senate, serving a single, four-year term. He was elected as a Democrat to represent the Tenth District in the U.S. House of Representatives. He served in the Forty-fourth and Forty-fifth Congresses (March 4, 1875 – March 3, 1879). He declined to be a candidate for renomination in 1878.

== Later life and death ==
After Clarke's service in the House, he resumed the practice of law. He died in Brooksville on May 23, 1911, and was interred in Mount Zion Cemetery.

U.S. House of Representatives
Preceded by John D. Young	Member of the U.S. House of Representatives from Kentucky's 10th congressional district March 4, 1875 – March 3, 1879 (obsolete district)	Succeeded by Elijah Phister
