= Joel Yancey =

American politician from Kentucky (1773–1838)

Member of the U.S. House of Representatives from Kentucky's 10th district
- In office March 4, 1827 – March 3, 1831
- Preceded by: Francis Johnson
- Succeeded by: Christopher Tompkins

Personal details
- Born: October 21, 1773 Albemarle County, Virginia
- Died: April 1838 (aged 64) Barren County, Kentucky
- Party: Jacksonian

Joel Yancey (October 21, 1773 – April 1838) was a United States representative from Kentucky. He was born in Albemarle County, Virginia. He served three terms in the Virginia House of Delegates, first representing Campbell County in the 1803-1804 and 1804-1805 sessions then Albemarle County in teh 1805-1806 session, when he was replaced by future Mississippi governor Walter Leake.

Later, Yancey moved to Kentucky. He owned slaves. Yancey was a member of the Kentucky House of Representatives 1809–1811. He also served in the Kentucky Senate 1816–1820 and 1824–1827.

Yancey was elected as a Jacksonian to the Twentieth and Twenty-first Congresses (March 4, 1827 – March 3, 1831). While in Congress, he served as chairman, Committee on Expenditures in the Post Office Department (Twenty-first Congress). He was an unsuccessful candidate for reelection in 1830 to the Twenty-second Congress. Yancey died in Barren County, Kentucky in April 1838 and was buried in that county.

U.S. House of Representatives
Preceded by Francis Johnson	Member of the U.S. House of Representatives from Kentucky's 10th congressional district March 4, 1827 – March 3, 1831	Succeeded by Christopher Tompkins
