= Samuel F. Swope =

American politician

Samuel Franklin Swope (March 1, 1809 – April 19, 1865) was a 19th-century politician and lawyer from Kentucky.

Born in Bourbon County, Kentucky, Swope attended the rural schools in Bourbon and Scott Counties and Georgetown College. He studied law and was admitted to the bar on March 1, 1830, commencing practice in Georgetown, Kentucky. He moved to Falmouth, Kentucky in 1832 and continued practicing law. He was a member of the Kentucky House of Representatives from 1837 to 1839 and again in 1841 and served in the Kentucky Senate from 1844 to 1848. Swope was elected an American "Know Nothing" to the United States House of Representatives in 1854, serving from 1855 to 1857. He resumed practicing law in Falmouth, Kentucky until his death on April 19, 1865. He was interred there in Riverside Cemetery.

U.S. House of Representatives
Preceded by Richard H. Stanton	Member of the U.S. House of Representatives from Kentucky's 10th congressional district March 4, 1855 – March 3, 1857 (obsolete district)	Succeeded by John W. Stevenson
