= William P. Taulbee =

American politician

William Taulbee
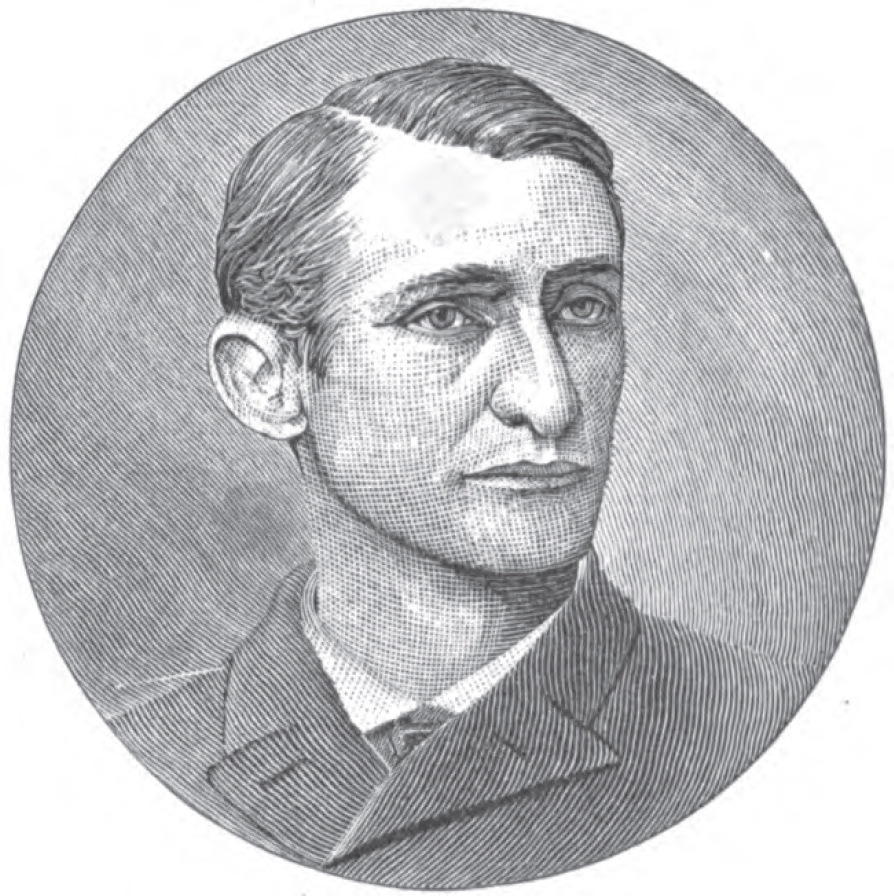

Member of the U.S. House of Representatives from Kentucky's 10th district
- In office March 4, 1885 – March 3, 1889
- Preceded by: John White
- Succeeded by: John Wilson

Personal details
- Born: William Preston Taulbee; October 22, 1851 Morgan County, Kentucky, U.S.
- Died: March 11, 1890 (aged 38) Washington, D.C., U.S.
- Party: Democratic
- Children: 5 sons

William Preston Taulbee (October 22, 1851 – March 11, 1890) was a U.S. representative from Kentucky.

== Early life and education ==
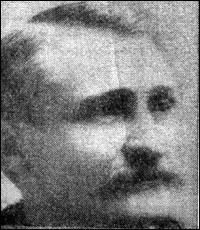
William Preston Taulbee circa 1890

Taulbee was a son of William Harrison Taulbee (1824–1905) and his wife, Mary Ann Wilson (1831–1916). Born near Mount Sterling, in Morgan County, Kentucky, Taulbee attended the common schools and was tutored by his father. He was ordained for the ministry and admitted to the Kentucky conference of the Methodist Episcopal Church, South. He studied law and was elected clerk of the Magoffin County Court in 1878 and reelected in 1882.

== Congress ==
In 1884, Taulbee ran for a seat in the United States House of Representatives. He was elected as a Democrat and served two terms, winning re-election in 1886.

During his tenure, he became embroiled in a long-running dispute with a Kentucky journalist, Charles Kincaid, who wrote a series of articles accusing Taulbee of profiting from his congressional service. The relationship between the two men hit a breaking point in December 1887, when Kincaid published in the Louisville Times newspaper a salacious account of an affair the congressman was alleged to be having with a young government employee. The ensuing scandal led to Taulbee's decision not to seek another term. He left office in March 1889 and became a lobbyist, frequently visiting former colleagues in the Capitol Building.

During his visits to the Capitol, Taulbee and Kincaid sometimes crossed paths. The two men detested one another, and Taulbee, a much larger man than Kincaid, was known to harass the reporter. Tensions boiled over on February 28, 1890, when Taulbee and Kincaid encountered one another on the second floor of the Capitol outside the House floor. Witnesses said the two exchanged harsh insults before Taulbee grabbed the shirt collar of Kincaid and threw him backwards. Taulbee went about his business as Kincaid ran home to get his pistol.

Later that day, Kincaid was descending the staircase on the House side of the Capitol when he saw Taulbee below him. As Taulbee approached, Kincaid pointed the pistol directly at Taulbee and shot him in the face. Taulbee fell onto the steps, bleeding profusely. When the police arrived, Kincaid admitted that he had fired the shot.

== Death and aftermath ==
Taulbee lingered for 11 days before he died from the effects of his wounds at Providence Hospital in Washington, D.C. on March 11, 1890. He was interred in the family burying ground near Mount Sterling, Kentucky. Blood stains from his wounds are still visible on the staircase in the Capitol Building where he was shot.

Kincaid was charged with murder. His defense team was led by U.S. Senator Daniel Voorhees of Indiana and the trial became a national sensation. After numerous delays, the trial began in March 1891, a year after Taulbee's death. Kincaid pleaded self-defense. On April 8, 1891, the jury returned a verdict of "not guilty."

Charles Kincaid went on to serve as a county judge in Jefferson County, Kentucky. He died on 2 November 1906, aged 51.

U.S. House of Representatives
Preceded by John White	Member of the U.S. House of Representatives from Kentucky's 10th congressional district 1885–1889	Succeeded by John Wilson
