= John W. Kendall =

American politician

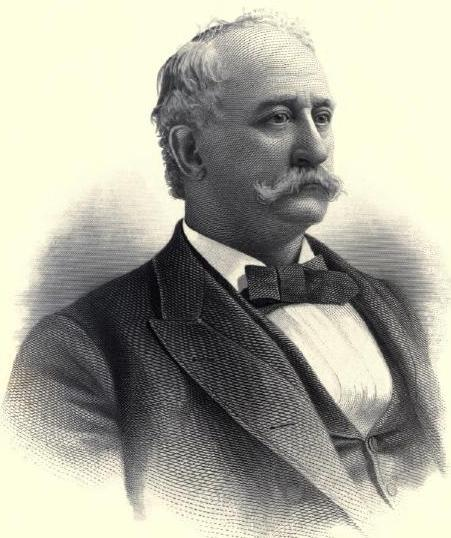

Member of the U.S. House of Representatives from Kentucky's 10th district
- In office March 4, 1891 – March 7, 1892
- Preceded by: John H. Wilson
- Succeeded by: Joseph M. Kendall

Member of the Kentucky House of Representatives
- In office August 5, 1867 – August 7, 1871
- Preceded by: Constituency established
- Succeeded by: William Mynhier
- Constituency: Magoffin, Morgan, and Rowan Counties

Personal details
- Born: John Wilkerson Kendall; June 26, 1834 Morgan County, Kentucky, U.S.
- Died: March 7, 1892 (aged 57) Washington, D.C., U.S.
- Resting place: Barber Cemetery, West Liberty, Kentucky
- Party: Democratic
- Occupation: Attorney

John Wilkerson Kendall (June 26, 1834 – March 7, 1892) was an American lawyer who served for one year as a U.S. representative from Kentucky from March 4, 1891, until his death on March 7, 1892.

He was the father of Joseph Morgan Kendall.

== Biography ==
Born in Morgan County, Kentucky, Kendall attended the common schools and Owingsville Academy, where he studied law. He was admitted to the bar in 1854 and commenced practice in West Liberty, Kentucky. He later served as prosecuting attorney of Morgan County from 1854 to 1858.

=== Civil War ===
During the Civil War Kendall served as first lieutenant and adjutant of the Tenth Kentucky Confederate Cavalry.

=== Political career ===
He served as a member of the State House of Representatives from 1867 to 1871. Afterwards, he became the Commonwealth attorney for the 13th judicial district from 1872 to 1878.

Kendall was elected as a Democrat to the Fifty-second Congress and served from March 4, 1891, until his death in Washington, D.C., on March 7, 1892.

=== Death ===
He was interred in Barber Cemetery, West Liberty, Kentucky.

== See also ==
- List of members of the United States Congress who died in office (1790–1899)

U.S. House of Representatives
| Preceded by John H. Wilson | Member of the U.S. House of Representatives from Kentucky's 10th congressional district March 4, 1891 – March 7, 1892 (obsolete district) | Succeeded by Joseph M. Kendall |
