= Chilton Allan =

American politician (1786–1858)

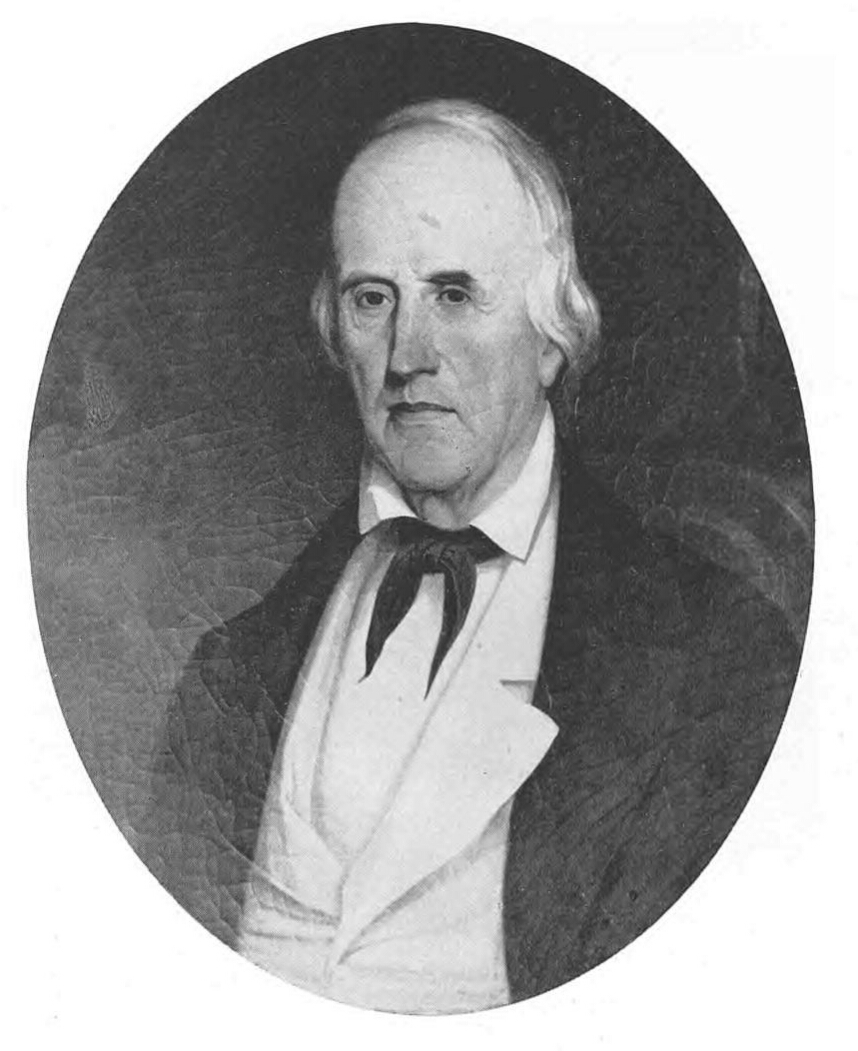

Member of the U.S. House of Representatives from Kentucky
- In office March 4, 1831 – March 3, 1837
- Preceded by: James Clark (3rd); Christopher Tompkins (10th)
- Succeeded by: Christopher Tompkins (3rd); Richard Hawes (10th)
- Constituency: 3rd district (1831-33); 10th district (1833–35)

Personal details
- Born: April 6, 1786 Albemarle County, Virginia, US
- Died: September 3, 1858 (aged 72) Winchester, Kentucky, US
- Resting place: Winchester Cemetery
- Party: Whig Party
- Children: 2

Chilton Allan (April 6, 1786 – September 3, 1858) was a United States representative from Kentucky.

== Biography ==
He was born in Albemarle County, Virginia on April 6, 1786, before moving with his mother to Winchester, Kentucky in 1797. He attended the common schools, and also received private instructions. After this, he served an apprenticeship of three years as a wheelwright, studying law in his leisure time. He was admitted to the bar in 1808 and commenced practice in Winchester, Kentucky. He owned slaves.

Allan was a member of the Kentucky House of Representatives in 1811, 1815, 1822, and 1830 and a member of the Kentucky Senate 1823–1827. He was elected as an Anti-Jacksonian to the Twenty-second and Twenty-third Congresses and reelected as a Whig to the Twenty-fourth Congress (March 4, 1831 – March 3, 1837). In Congress, he served as chairman, Committee on Territories (Twenty-third Congress) but was not a candidate for renomination in 1836.

After leaving Congress, he was appointed president of the Kentucky board of internal improvements in 1837 and served until 1839, when he resigned. He resumed the practice of law and was again a member of the Kentucky House of Representatives in 1842. He died in Winchester, Kentucky on September 3, 1858 and was buried in Winchester Cemetery.

== Sources ==
- Allen, William B. (1872). A History of Kentucky: Embracing Gleanings, Reminiscences, Antiquities, Natural Curiosities, Statistics, and Biographical Sketches of Pioneers, Soldiers, Jurists, Lawyers, Statesmen, Divines, Mechanics, Farmers, Merchants, and Other Leading Men, of All Occupations and Pursuits. Bradley & Gilbert. pp. 241–251. ISBN 9780608434209.
- Johnson, Rossiter, ed. (1906). "Allan, Chilton". The Biographical Dictionary of America. Vol. 1. Boston: American Biographical Society. p. 79.
- United States Congress. "Chilton Allan (id: A000108)". Biographical Directory of the United States Congress.

U.S. House of Representatives
Preceded by James Clark	Member of the U.S. House of Representatives from Kentucky's 3rd congressional district 1831–1833	Succeeded by Christopher Tompkins
Preceded by Christopher Tompkins	Member of the U.S. House of Representatives from Kentucky's 10th congressional district 1833–1837	Succeeded by Richard Hawes
