= Henry Daniel (politician) =

American politician

Henry Daniel (March 15, 1786 – October 5, 1873) was a United States representative from Kentucky. He was born in Louisa County, Virginia. He attended the public schools and then moved to Kentucky. He studied law and was admitted to the bar and commenced practice in Mount Sterling, Kentucky.

Daniel was a member of the Kentucky House of Representatives in 1812. He served in the War of 1812 as captain of the Eighth Regiment, United States Infantry, 1813–1815. After the war, he was again a member of the Kentucky House of Representatives in 1819 and 1826.

Daniel was elected as a Jacksonian to the Twentieth, Twenty-first, and Twenty-second Congresses (March 4, 1827 – March 3, 1833). He was an unsuccessful candidate for reelection in 1832 to the Twenty-third Congress. After leaving Congress, he resumed the practice of law. He died in Mount Sterling, Kentucky in 1873 and was buried in Macphelah Cemetery.

U.S. House of Representatives
Preceded by David Trimble	Member of the U.S. House of Representatives from Kentucky's 1st congressional district 1827–1833	Succeeded by Chittenden Lyon
