= Kentucky's 10th congressional district =

Former Kentucky congressional district

Coordinates: 37°45′N 82°45′W

- Obsolete district
- Created: 1810; 1870
- Eliminated: 1860; 1930
- Years active: 1813–1863; 1873–1933

Kentucky's 10th congressional district was a district of the United States House of Representatives in Kentucky. It was lost to redistricting in 1933. Its last representative was Andrew J. May.

== List of members representing the district ==
Member	Party	Years	Cong ress	Electoral history	Location
District created March 4, 1813
William P. Duval (Bardstown)	Democratic-Republican	March 4, 1813 – March 3, 1815	13th	Elected in 1812. Retired.	1813–1823; Green, Hardin, Nelson, and Washington counties
Benjamin Hardin (Bardstown)	Democratic-Republican	March 4, 1815 – March 3, 1817	14th	Elected in 1814. Retired.	1813–1823; Green, Hardin, Nelson, and Washington counties
Thomas Speed (Bardstown)	Democratic-Republican	March 4, 1817 – March 3, 1819	15th	Elected in 1816. Retired.	1813–1823; Green, Hardin, Nelson, and Washington counties
Benjamin Hardin (Bardstown)	Democratic-Republican	March 4, 1819 – March 3, 1823	16th 17th	Elected in 1818. Re-elected in 1820. Retired.	1813–1823; Green, Hardin, Nelson, and Washington counties
Francis Johnson (Bowling Green)	Democratic-Republican	March 4, 1823 – March 3, 1825	18th 19th	Redistricted from the 6th district and re-elected in 1822. Re-elected in 1824. Lost re-election.	1823–1833; Allen, Barren, Logan, Monroe, Simpson, and Warren counties
Francis Johnson (Bowling Green)	Anti-Jacksonian	March 4, 1825 – March 3, 1827	18th 19th	Redistricted from the 6th district and re-elected in 1822. Re-elected in 1824. Lost re-election.	1823–1833; Allen, Barren, Logan, Monroe, Simpson, and Warren counties
Joel Yancey (Glasgow)	Jacksonian	March 4, 1827 – March 3, 1831	20th 21st	Elected in 1827. Re-elected in 1829. Lost re-election.	1823–1833; Allen, Barren, Logan, Monroe, Simpson, and Warren counties
Christopher Tompkins (Glasgow)	Anti-Jacksonian	March 4, 1831 – March 3, 1833	22nd	Elected in 1831. Redistricted to the 3rd district.	1823–1833; Allen, Barren, Logan, Monroe, Simpson, and Warren counties
Chilton Allan (Winchester)	Anti-Jacksonian	March 4, 1833 – March 3, 1837	23rd 24th	Redistricted from the 3rd district and re-elected in 1833. Re-elected in 1835. Retired.	1833–1843 [data missing]
Richard Hawes (Winchester)	Whig	March 4, 1837 – March 3, 1841	25th 26th	Elected in 1837. Re-elected in 1839. Retired.	1833–1843 [data missing]
Thomas F. Marshall (Versailles)	Whig	March 4, 1841 – March 3, 1843	27th	Elected in 1841. Retired.	1833–1843 [data missing]
John W. Tibbatts (Newport)	Democratic	March 4, 1843 – March 3, 1847	28th 29th	Elected in 1843. Re-elected in 1845. Retired.	1843–1853 [data missing]
John P. Gaines (Walton)	Whig	March 4, 1847 – March 3, 1849	30th	Elected in 1847. Lost re-election.	1843–1853 [data missing]
Richard H. Stanton (Maysville)	Democratic	March 4, 1849 – March 3, 1855	31st 32nd 33rd	Elected in 1849. Re-elected in 1851. Re-elected in 1853. Lost re-election.	1843–1853 [data missing]
Richard H. Stanton (Maysville)	Democratic	March 4, 1849 – March 3, 1855	31st 32nd 33rd	Elected in 1849. Re-elected in 1851. Re-elected in 1853. Lost re-election.	1853–1863 [data missing]
Samuel F. Swope (Falmouth)	Know Nothing	March 4, 1855 – March 3, 1857	34th	Elected in 1855. Retired.	1853–1863 [data missing]
John W. Stevenson (Covington)	Democratic	March 4, 1857 – March 3, 1861	35th 36th	Elected in 1857. Re-elected in 1859. Lost re-election.	1853–1863 [data missing]
John W. Menzies (Covington)	Union Democratic	March 4, 1861 – March 3, 1863	37th	Elected in 1861. Redistricted to the 6th district and lost re-election.	1853–1863 [data missing]
District suspended March 3, 1863
District re-established March 4, 1873
John D. Young (Owingsville)	Democratic	March 4, 1873 – March 3, 1875	43rd	Elected in 1872. Retired.	1873–1883 [data missing]
John B. Clarke (Brooksville)	Democratic	March 4, 1875 – March 3, 1879	44th 45th	Elected in 1874. Re-elected in 1876. Retired.	1873–1883 [data missing]
Elijah Phister (Maysville)	Democratic	March 4, 1879 – March 3, 1883	46th 47th	Elected in 1878. Re-elected in 1880. Retired.	1873–1883 [data missing]
John D. White (Manchester)	Republican	March 4, 1883 – March 3, 1885	48th	Redistricted from the 9th district and re-elected in 1882. Retired.	1883–1893 [data missing]
William P. Taulbee (Salyersville)	Democratic	March 4, 1885 – March 3, 1889	49th 50th	Elected in 1884. Re-elected in 1886. Retired.	1883–1893 [data missing]
John H. Wilson (Barboursville)	Republican	March 4, 1889 – March 3, 1891	51st	Elected in 1888. Redistricted to the 11th district.	1883–1893 [data missing]
John W. Kendall (West Liberty)	Democratic	March 4, 1891 – March 7, 1892	52nd	Elected in 1890. Died.	1883–1893 [data missing]
Vacant		March 7, 1892 – April 21, 1892	52nd		1883–1893 [data missing]
Joseph M. Kendall (Prestonsburg)	Democratic	April 21, 1892 – March 3, 1893	52nd	Elected to finish his father's term. Retired.	1883–1893 [data missing]
Marcus C. Lisle (Winchester)	Democratic	March 4, 1893 – July 7, 1894	53rd	Elected in 1892. Died.	1893–1903 [data missing]
Vacant		July 7, 1894 – December 3, 1894	53rd		1893–1903 [data missing]
William M. Beckner (Winchester)	Democratic	December 3, 1894 – March 3, 1895	53rd	Elected to finish Lisle's term. Lost renomination.	1893–1903 [data missing]
Joseph M. Kendall (Prestonsburg)	Democratic	March 4, 1895 – February 18, 1897	54th	Elected in 1894. Lost contested election.	1893–1903 [data missing]
Nathan T. Hopkins (Marshall)	Republican	February 18, 1897 – March 3, 1897	54th	Won contested election. Retired.	1893–1903 [data missing]
Thomas Y. Fitzpatrick (Prestonsburg)	Democratic	March 4, 1897 – March 3, 1901	55th 56th	Elected in 1896. Re-elected in 1898. Retired.	1893–1903 [data missing]
James B. White (Irvine)	Democratic	March 4, 1901 – March 3, 1903	57th	Elected in 1900. Retired.	1893–1903 [data missing]
Francis A. Hopkins (Prestonsburg)	Democratic	March 4, 1903 – March 3, 1907	58th 59th	Elected in 1902. Re-elected in 1904. Lost re-election.	1903–1913 [data missing]
John W. Langley (Pikeville)	Republican	March 4, 1907 – January 11, 1926	60th 61st 62nd 63rd 64th 65th 66th 67th 68th 69th	Elected in 1906. Re-elected in 1908. Re-elected in 1910. Re-elected in 1912. Re-elected in 1914. Re-elected in 1916. Re-elected in 1918. Re-elected in 1920. Re-elected in 1922. Re-elected in 1924. Resigned after conviction for illegally selling alcohol.	1903–1913 [data missing]
John W. Langley (Pikeville)	Republican	March 4, 1907 – January 11, 1926	60th 61st 62nd 63rd 64th 65th 66th 67th 68th 69th	Elected in 1906. Re-elected in 1908. Re-elected in 1910. Re-elected in 1912. Re-elected in 1914. Re-elected in 1916. Re-elected in 1918. Re-elected in 1920. Re-elected in 1922. Re-elected in 1924. Resigned after conviction for illegally selling alcohol.	1913–1933
Vacant		January 11, 1926 – February 13, 1926	69th		1913–1933
Andrew J. Kirk (Jenkins)	Republican	February 13, 1926 – March 3, 1927	69th	Elected to finish Langley's term. Lost renomination.	1913–1933
Katherine G. Langley (Pikeville)	Republican	March 4, 1927 – March 3, 1931	70th 71st	Elected in 1926. Re-elected in 1928. Lost re-election.	1913–1933
Andrew J. May (Prestonsburg)	Democratic	March 4, 1931 – March 3, 1933	72nd	Elected in 1930. Redistricted to the at-large district.	1913–1933
District eliminated March 3, 1933
