= James Bamford White =

American politician

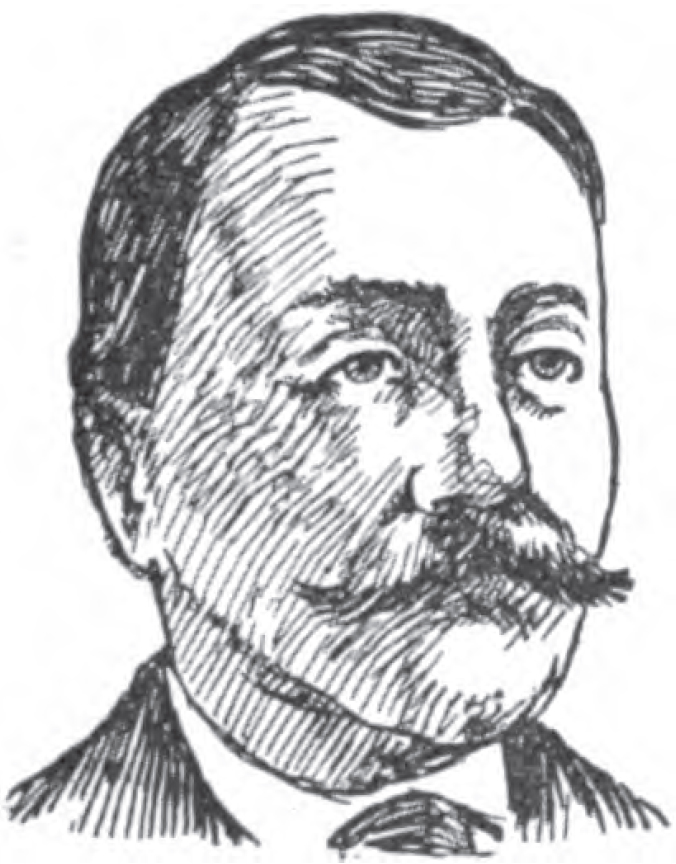

Member of the U.S. House of Representatives from Kentucky's 10th district
- In office March 4, 1901 – March 3, 1903
- Preceded by: Thomas Y. Fitzpatrick
- Succeeded by: Francis A. Hopkins

Personal details
- Born: June 6, 1842 Clark County, Kentucky
- Died: March 25, 1931 (aged 88) Irvine, Kentucky
- Resting place: Oak Dale Cemetery
- Party: Democratic
- Education: Mount Zion Academy
- Profession: Lawyer

Military service
- Allegiance: Confederate States of America
- Branch/service: Confederate States Army
- Years of service: 1863 – 1865
- Battles/wars: American Civil War

James Bamford White (June 6, 1842 – March 25, 1931) was an American educator, lawyer, Confederate Civil War veteran, and politician who served one term as a U.S. representative from Kentucky from 1901 to 1903.

== Biography ==
Born near Winchester, Kentucky, White attended the common schools and the Mount Zion Academy, Macon County, Illinois.

He entered the Confederate States Army in the fall of 1863 and served in the commands of Generals Breckinridge and Morgan until the close of the Civil War, when he was honorably discharged.

He engaged in teaching at Irvine, Kentucky. He studied law while teaching. He was admitted to the bar in 1867 and commenced the practice of law in Irvine.

He served as prosecuting attorney of Estill County 1872–1880.

== Congress ==
White was elected as a Democrat to the Fifty-seventh Congress (March 4, 1901 – March 3, 1903).

== Later career and death ==
He continued the practice of his profession in Irvine, Kentucky, until his retirement in 1919.

He died in Irvine, Kentucky, March 25, 1931. He was interred in Oakdale Cemetery.

U.S. House of Representatives
| Preceded by Thomas Y. Fitzpatrick | Member of the U.S. House of Representatives from Kentucky's 10th congressional district March 4, 1901 – March 3, 1903 (obsolete district) | Succeeded by Francis A. Hopkins |
