= Francis Johnson (Kentucky politician) =

American politician (1776–1842)

Member of the U.S. House of Representatives from Kentucky
- In office November 13, 1820 – March 4, 1827
- Preceded by: David Walker (6th); Benjamin Hardin (10th)
- Succeeded by: David White (6th); Joel Yancey (10th)
- Constituency: 6th district (1820-23); 10th district (1823-27)

Member of the Kentucky House of Representatives
- In office 1812; 1813; 1815

Personal details
- Born: Caroline County, Virginia
- Died: Louisville, Kentucky
- Party: Adams-Clay Republican, Adams Party

Francis Johnson (June 19, 1776 – May 16, 1842) was a U.S. representative from Kentucky.

Born in Caroline County, Virginia, Johnson pursued preparatory studies. He studied law. He was admitted to the bar and practiced. He owned slaves. He moved to Woodford County, Kentucky, in 1796 and to Bowling Green in 1807. He served as member of the State house of representatives in 1812, 1813, and 1815.

Johnson was elected as a Democratic-Republican to the Sixteenth Congress to fill the vacancy caused by the death of David Walker and reelected to the Seventeenth Congress.

Johnson was elected as an Adams-Clay Republican to the Eighteenth Congress and as an Adams candidate to the Nineteenth Congress and served from November 13, 1820, to March 3, 1827. He served as chairman of the Committee on the Post Office and Post Roads (Seventeenth and Eighteenth Congresses). He moved to Louisville, Kentucky, in 1829 and resumed the practice of law. He served as Commonwealth attorney for the fifth district. He was an unsuccessful Republican candidate for Governor. He died in Louisville, Kentucky, May 16, 1842. He was interred in the old family burial ground, later a municipal playground.

U.S. House of Representatives
Preceded by David Walker	Member of the U.S. House of Representatives from Kentucky's 6th congressional district 1820 – 1823	Succeeded by David White
Preceded by Benjamin Hardin	Member of the U.S. House of Representatives from Kentucky's 10th congressional district 1823 – 1827	Succeeded by Joel Yancey
