= Nathan T. Hopkins =

American politician

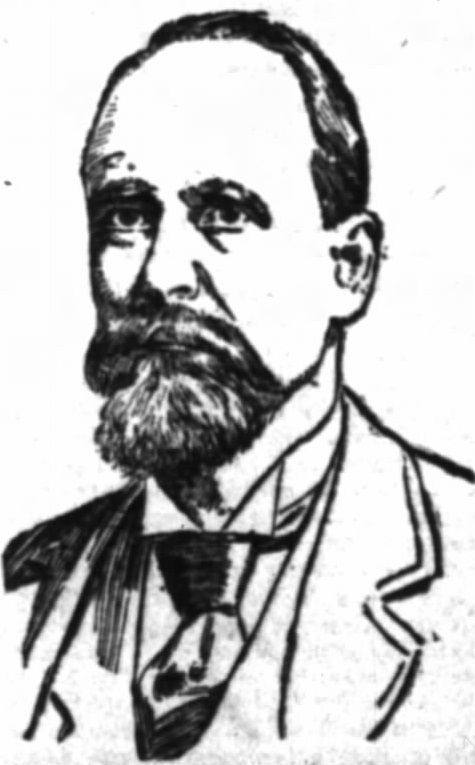

Member of the U.S. House of Representatives from Kentucky's 10th district
- In office February 18, 1897 – March 3, 1897
- Preceded by: Joseph M. Kendall
- Succeeded by: Thomas Y. Fitzpatrick

Personal details
- Born: Nathan Thomas Hopkins; October 27, 1852 Ashe County, North Carolina, USA
- Died: February 11, 1927 (aged 74) Pikeville, Kentucky, USA
- Resting place: Lake View Cemetery
- Party: Democratic

Nathan Thomas Hopkins (October 27, 1852 – February 11, 1927) was an American religious leader and politician who served one term as a U.S. representative from Kentucky from 1895 to 1897.

== Early life and career ==
Born in Ashe County, North Carolina, Hopkins moved to Pike County, Kentucky where he was a standout pupil in the common schooling system and, eventually, rose to become a prominent agriculturist in the region. Also, ordained to the ministry in 1876, he was an active leader of the Baptist Church in Yeager, Kentucky, for over half a century. Thereafter becoming noteworthy across the county for his leadership and oratorical skills, Hopkins was voted in as County tax assessor for Floyd County from 1878 to 1890.

He married Nancy Jane Johnson. (February 26, 1850 – February 16, 1937)

== Political career ==
He later moved back to his home state of North Carolina where he was elected to the North Carolina House of Representatives from 1893 to 1894 and 1923 to 1924. Nonetheless, he returned to Pike County, KY where he, then, a year later successfully contested the incumbent Representative of Kentucky's 10 District, Joseph M. Kendall to the Fifty-fourth Congress (February 18, 1897 – March 3, 1897) as a Republican.

=== Congress ===
Hopkins served as the Representative to Kentucky's 10th District in the United States Congress for one term, from 1895 to 1897. Afterwards, he retired to his home in Yeager, KY in Pike County where he was a merchant, timber harvester, lumberman and farmer. Later on, he was an unsuccessful candidate for election to the Fifty-seventh Congress in 1900.

== Retirement and death ==
For the rest of his life he was committed to only agriculture and the Church near Yeager, Kentucky. He died in Pikeville, Kentucky, February 11, 1927, where he is interred at Potter Cemetery, Yeager, Kentucky.

U.S. House of Representatives
Preceded by Joseph M. Kendall	Member of the U.S. House of Representatives from Kentucky's 10th congressional district February 18, 1897 – March 3, 1897 (obsolete district)	Succeeded by Thomas Y. Fitzpatrick
