= Thomas Y. Fitzpatrick =

American politician

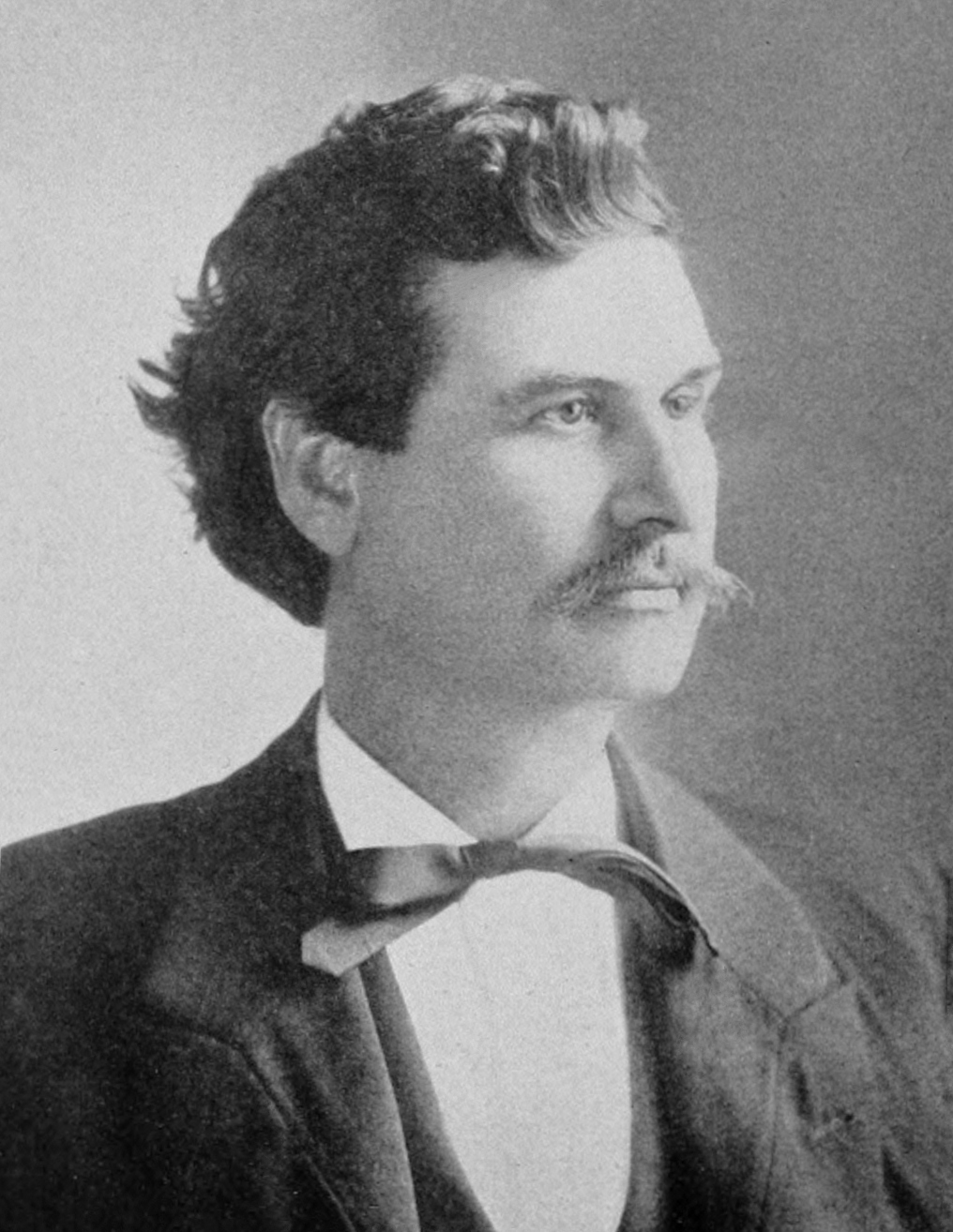

Member of the U.S. House of Representatives from Kentucky's 10th district
- In office March 4, 1897 – March 3, 1901
- Preceded by: Nathan T. Hopkins
- Succeeded by: James Bamford White

Member of the Kentucky House of Representatives
- In office 1876-1877

Personal details
- Born: Thomas Young Fitzpatrick; September 20, 1850 Floyd County, Kentucky
- Died: January 21, 1906 (aged 55) Frankfort, Kentucky
- Resting place: Frankfort Cemetery
- Party: Democratic
- Profession: Lawyer

Thomas Young Fitzpatrick (September 20, 1850 – January 21, 1906) was an American lawyer and politician who served two terms as a U.S. representative from Kentucky from 1897 to 1901.

== Biography ==
Born near Prestonsburg, Kentucky, Fitzpatrick attended the common schools. He studied law. He was admitted to the bar in 1877 and practiced.

=== Early political career ===
He served as a county judge in 1874 and 1875, then as a member of the State house of representatives in 1876 and 1877. He was a county attorney from 1880 to 1884.

=== Congress ===
Fitzpatrick was elected as a Democrat to the Fifty-fifth and Fifty-sixth Congresses (March 4, 1897 – March 3, 1901).

=== Death ===
He died in Frankfort, Kentucky, January 21, 1906. He was interred in Frankfort Cemetery.

U.S. House of Representatives
Preceded by Nathan T. Hopkins	Member of the U.S. House of Representatives from Kentucky's 10th congressional district March 4, 1897 – March 3, 1901 (obsolete district)	Succeeded by James B. White
