= Patrick H. Pope =

American politician (1806–1841)

Member of the U.S. House of Representatives from Kentucky's 8th district
- In office March 4, 1833 – March 3, 1835
- Preceded by: Richard Aylett Buckner
- Succeeded by: William Jordan Graves

Personal details
- Born: Patrick Hamilton Hope; March 17, 1806 Louisville, Kentucky, U.S.
- Died: May 4, 1841 (aged 35) Louisville, Kentucky, U.S.
- Resting place: Cave Hill Cemetery; Louisville, Kentucky, U.S.
- Party: Jacksonian democracy

Patrick Hamilton Pope (March 17, 1806 – May 4, 1841) was a U.S. representative from Kentucky.

Born in Louisville, Kentucky, Pope attended the common schools and graduated from St. Joseph's College, Bardstown, Kentucky. He studied law. He was admitted to the bar in 1827 and commenced practice in Louisville. He declined the position of Secretary of State tendered by Gov. John Breathitt in 1832.

Pope was elected as a Jacksonian to the Twenty-third Congress (March 4, 1833 – March 3, 1835). He was an unsuccessful candidate for reelection in 1834.

Pope was elected a member of the Kentucky House of Representatives in 1836. He resumed the practice of law. He died in Louisville on May 4, 1841, and was interred in Cave Hill Cemetery.

U.S. House of Representatives
Preceded by Richard A. Buckner	Member of the U.S. House of Representatives from Kentucky's 8th congressional district 1833 – 1835	Succeeded by William J. Graves
