= Richard H. Stanton =

American journalist and politician

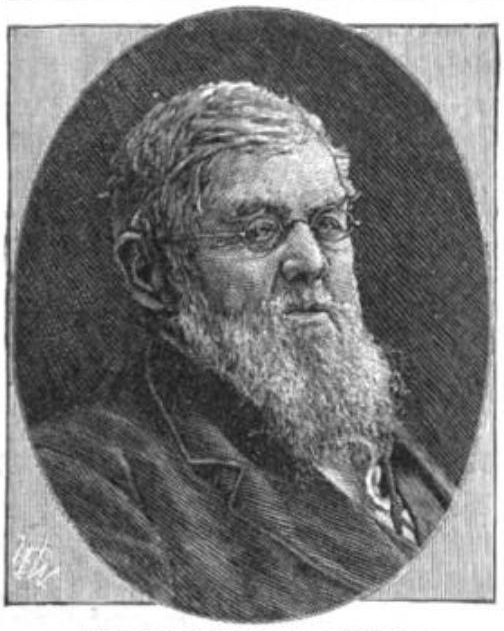

Member of the U.S. House of Representatives from Kentucky's 10th district
- In office March 4, 1849 – March 3, 1855
- Preceded by: John P. Gaines
- Succeeded by: Samuel F. Swope

Personal details
- Born: September 9, 1812 Alexandria, DC
- Died: March 20, 1891 (aged 78) Maysville, Kentucky
- Resting place: Maysville Cemetery
- Party: Democratic
- Relations: Frederick P. Stanton
- Parent(s): Richard Stanton; Harriet Perry Stanton
- Education: Alexandria Academy
- Profession: Lawyer, Newspaper editor

Richard Henry Stanton (September 9, 1812 – March 20, 1891) was a politician, lawyer, editor and judge from Kentucky. A Democrat, he served three terms as a Congressman from Kentucky and was imprisoned during the Civil War.

Stanton was born in Alexandria, then part of the District of Columbia. His parents were Richard and Harriet Perry Stanton. After briefly working with his father, a bricklayer, he studied law, settled in Maysville, Kentucky, and was admitted to the Kentucky bar in 1839. He was also editor of the Maysville Monitor from 1835 to 1842 and served as town postmaster from 1845 to 1849.

He was elected to the United States House of Representatives as a Democrat in 1848, serving from 1849 to 1855. There, he served as chairman of the Committee on Public Buildings and Grounds from 1849 to 1853 and of the Committee on Elections from 1853 to 1855. He was unsuccessful for reelection in 1854. Afterwards, Stanton served as a state's attorney from 1858 to 1862.

At the beginning of the Civil War, Stanton was arrested and held at Camp Chase in Columbus, Ohio for supporting secession.

Stanton was a delegate to the Democratic National Convention in 1868, whose slogan was "This is a White Man's Country, Let White Men Rule". He was a district judge from 1868 to 1874. He wrote a number of legal books. He resumed practicing law until his retirement in 1885 and died on March 20, 1891, in Maysville, Kentucky. He was interred there in Maysville Cemetery.

Stanton is credited with naming Washington Territory, later the state of Washington, during an 1853 debate over the territory's preferred name of "Columbia". He argued that the proposed name would easily be confused with the nation's capital, the District of Columbia. Congress later approved the "Washington" name change and President Millard Fillmore signed the bill into law on March 2, 1853, officially creating the Washington Territory.

Stanton's brother, Frederick P. Stanton, also served in the U.S. House from Tennessee and as interim Territorial Governor of Kansas.

U.S. House of Representatives
Preceded by John P. Gaines	Member of the U.S. House of Representatives from Kentucky's 10th congressional district March 4, 1849 – March 3, 1855 (obsolete district)	Succeeded by Samuel F. Swope
