= Joseph Lecompte =

American politician

Joseph Lecompte (December 15, 1797 – April 25, 1851) was a United States representative from Kentucky. He was born in Woodford County, Kentucky near the town of Georgetown, Kentucky. He moved to Henry County, Kentucky with his parents, who settled in Lecomptes Bottom on the Kentucky River where he attended the common schools. Later, he engaged in agricultural pursuits. He owned slaves.

Lecompte served during the War of 1812. He was a member of the Kentucky Riflemen. During the conflict, he participated in the Battle of New Orleans. After the war, he served as a major in the Kentucky militia.

Lecompte was a member of the Kentucky House of Representatives in 1819, 1822, 1838, 1839, and 1844. He was elected to the Nineteenth Congress and reelected to the Twentieth and Twenty-first Congresses and reelected as a Jacksonian to the Twenty-second Congress (March 4, 1825 – March 3, 1833). He was not a candidate for renomination in 1832. After leaving Congress, he resumed agricultural pursuits and was later a member of the Kentucky constitutional convention in 1850. He died in Henry County, Kentucky in 1851 and was buried in the private cemetery in Lecomptes Bottom, on the Kentucky River, Henry County, Kentucky.

U.S. House of Representatives
| Preceded by David White | Member of the U.S. House of Representatives from Kentucky's 6th congressional district 1825 – 1833 | Succeeded by Thomas Chilton |
