= David White (Kentucky politician) =

American politician

Member of the U.S. House of Representatives from Kentucky's 6th district
- In office March 4, 1823 – March 3, 1825
- Preceded by: Francis Johnson
- Succeeded by: Joseph Lecompte

Member of the Kentucky House of Representatives
- In office 1826

Personal details
- Born: 1785
- Died: November 19, 1834 (aged 48–49) Franklin County, Kentucky
- Party: Adams-Clay Republican, Adams Party

David White (1785 – October 19, 1834) was a U.S. representative from Kentucky.

Born in 1785, White completed preparatory studies. He studied law. He was admitted to the bar and commenced practice in New Castle, Kentucky. He served as member of the State house of representatives in 1826.

White was elected as an Adams Clay Republican to the Eighteenth Congress (March 4, 1823 – March 3, 1825). He died in Franklin County, Kentucky, October 19, 1834.

U.S. House of Representatives
| Preceded by Francis Johnson | Member of the U.S. House of Representatives from Kentucky's 6th congressional district 1823 – 1825 | Succeeded by Joseph Lecompte |
