= David Trimble (American politician) =

American politician (1782–1842)

Member of the U.S. House of Representatives from Kentucky's 1st district
- In office March 4, 1817 – March 3, 1827
- Preceded by: Thomas Fletcher
- Succeeded by: Henry Daniel

Personal details
- Born: June 1782 Frederick County, Virginia, U.S.
- Died: October 20, 1842 (aged 60) Greenup County, Kentucky, U.S.

David Trimble (June 1782 – October 20, 1842) was a U.S. representative from Kentucky.

Born in Frederick County, Virginia, in June 1782, Trimble graduated from the College of William and Mary, Williamsburg, Virginia, in 1799. He studied law. He was admitted to the bar and commenced legal practice in Mount Sterling, Kentucky. He owned slaves. He served in the War of 1812 as brigade quartermaster of the First Brigade, Kentucky Mounted Militia, and later as a private in the Battalion of Kentucky Mounted Infantry Volunteers commanded by Major Dudley.

Trimble was elected as a Democratic-Republican to the Fifteenth through the Seventeenth Congress. He was reelected as an Adams-Clay Republican to the Eighteenth Congress and elected as an Adams candidate to the Nineteenth Congress (March 4, 1817 – March 3, 1827). He served as chairman of the Committee on Expenditures in the Department of the Treasury (Sixteenth Congress) and was on the Committee on Elections (Sixteenth Congress). He was an unsuccessful candidate for reelection to the Twentieth Congress. He died at Trimble's Furnace, Greenup County, Kentucky, October 20, 1842.

U.S. House of Representatives
Preceded by Thomas Fletcher	Member of the U.S. House of Representatives from Kentucky's 1st congressional district 1817–1827	Succeeded by Henry Daniel
