= Christopher Tompkins =

American politician

Christopher Tompkins (March 24, 1780 – August 9, 1858) was a United States representative from Kentucky. He was born in Green County, Kentucky where, he completed preparatory studies. He studied law and was admitted to the bar and commenced practice in Glasgow, Kentucky.

Tompkins was a member of the Kentucky House of Representatives in 1805. He was elected as an Anti-Jacksonian to the Twenty-second and Twenty-third Congresses (March 4, 1831 – March 3, 1835). After leaving Congress, he was again a member of the Kentucky House of Representatives in 1835 and 1836. In addition, he served as a presidential elector on the Whig ticket in 1837. He resumed the practice of law. He died in Glasgow, Kentucky in 1858 and was buried in the family burying ground at Glasgow, Kentucky.

U.S. House of Representatives
Preceded by Joel Yancey	Member of the U.S. House of Representatives from Kentucky's 10th congressional district 1831-1833	Succeeded by Chilton Allan
Preceded by Chilton Allan	Member of the U.S. House of Representatives from Kentucky's 3rd congressional district 1833–1835	Succeeded by Joseph R. Underwood
