= Ralph Waldo Emerson Gilbert =

American politician

Ralph Gilbert
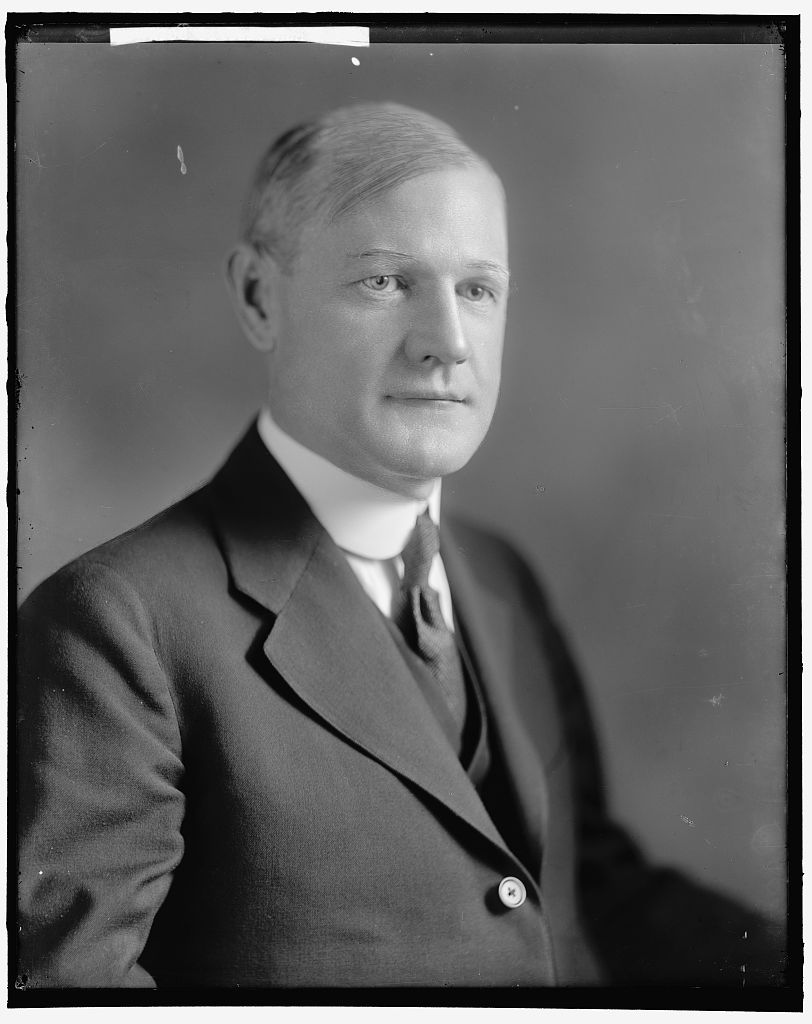

Member of the Kentucky Senate from the 21st district
- In office January 1, 1936 – July 30, 1939
- Preceded by: Perry B. Gaines
- Succeeded by: Gilbert Wood

Member of the Kentucky House of Representatives from the 50th district
- In office January 1, 1934 – January 1, 1936
- Preceded by: C. Murrell Middleton
- Succeeded by: William T. Baker
- In office January 1, 1930 – March 4, 1931
- Preceded by: Ephraim J. Doss
- Succeeded by: C. Murrell Middleton

Member of the U.S. House of Representatives from Kentucky's 8th district
- In office March 4, 1931 – March 3, 1933
- Preceded by: Lewis L. Walker
- Succeeded by: Brent Spence
- In office March 4, 1921 – March 3, 1929
- Preceded by: King Swope
- Succeeded by: Lewis L. Walker

Personal details
- Born: January 17, 1882 Taylorsville, Kentucky
- Died: July 30, 1939 (aged 57) Louisville, Kentucky
- Resting place: Shelbyville, Kentucky
- Party: Democratic

Ralph Waldo Emerson Gilbert (January 17, 1882 – July 30, 1939) was a U.S. representative from Kentucky, son of George Gilmore Gilbert.

Born in Taylorsville, Kentucky, Gilbert attended the public schools and the University of Virginia at Charlottesville. He was graduated from the law school of the University of Louisville in 1901. He was admitted to the bar the same year and commenced practice in Shelbyville, Kentucky.

Gilbert was elected judge of the Shelby County Court in 1910. He was reelected in 1914 and served until his resignation in 1917.

Gilbert was elected as a Democrat to the Sixty-seventh and to the three succeeding Congresses (March 4, 1921 – March 3, 1929). He was an unsuccessful candidate for reelection in 1928 to the Seventy-first Congress. He served as member of the Kentucky House of Representatives in 1929.

Gilbert was elected to the Seventy-second Congress (March 4, 1931 – March 3, 1933). He was not a candidate for renomination in 1932. He resumed the practice of law in Shelbyville, Kentucky. He again served in the Kentucky House of Representatives in 1933.

Gilbert was elected a member of the Kentucky Senate in 1936 and served until his death in Louisville, Kentucky, July 30, 1939. He was interred in Grove Hill Cemetery, Shelbyville, Kentucky.

U.S. House of Representatives
| Preceded by King Swope | Member of the U.S. House of Representatives from Kentucky's 8th congressional district March 4, 1921 – March 3, 1929 | Succeeded by Lewis L. Walker |
| Preceded by Lewis L. Walker | Member of the U.S. House of Representatives from Kentucky's 8th congressional district March 4, 1931 – March 3, 1933 | Succeeded by Brent Spence |
