= Thomas Fletcher (Kentucky politician) =

American politician

Member of the U.S. House of Representatives from Kentucky's 1st district
- In office December 2, 1816 – March 3, 1817
- Preceded by: James Clark
- Succeeded by: David Trimble

Member of the Kentucky House of Representatives
- In office 1803, 1805–1806, 1817, 1820–1821, 1823, and 1825

Personal details
- Born: October 21, 1779 Westmoreland County, Pennsylvania, U.S.
- Died: March 13, 1826 near Sharpsburg, Kentucky, U.S.
- Resting place: near Sharpsburg, Kentucky, U.S.
- Party: Democratic-Republican
- Profession: Politician

Military service
- Allegiance: United States
- Rank: Major
- Battles/wars: War of 1812

Thomas Fletcher (October 21, 1779 - March 13, 1826) was a U.S. representative from Kentucky.

Born in Westmoreland County, Pennsylvania, Fletcher settled in Montgomery County, Kentucky. He served as member of the Kentucky state house of representatives in 1803, 1805, and 1806. He served in the War of 1812 as major of Kentucky Volunteers under General Harrison.

Fletcher was elected as a Democratic-Republican to the Fourteenth Congress to fill the vacancy caused by the resignation of United States James Clark (December 2, 1816 – March 3, 1817). He declined to be a candidate for renomination in 1816.

Fletcher was again elected a member of the State house of representatives and served in 1817, 1820, 1821, 1823, and 1825. He died on March 13, 1826, near Sharpsburg, Kentucky. He was interred in a private burial ground near Sharpsburg, Kentucky.

U.S. House of Representatives
Preceded by James Clark	Member of the U.S. House of Representatives from Kentucky's 1st congressional district 1816–1817	Succeeded by David Trimble
