= John H. Wilson (Kentucky politician) =

American politician (1846–1923)

John Henry Wilson
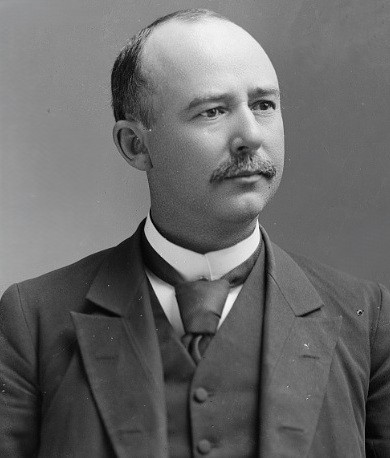
- C.M. Bell Studio Collection (Library of Congress)

Member of the U.S. House of Representatives from Kentucky's 11th district
- In office March 4, 1889 – March 3, 1893

Member of the Kentucky State Senate
- In office 1883–1887

Personal details
- Born: January 30, 1846 Crab Orchard, Kentucky, U.S.
- Died: January 14, 1923 (aged 76) Louisville, Kentucky, U.S.
- Resting place: Barbourville Cemetery
- Party: Republican
- Education: Tusculum College
- Occupation: Lawyer

John Henry Wilson (January 30, 1846 – January 14, 1923) was a U.S. representative from Kentucky.

Born in Crab Orchard, Kentucky, Wilson pursued preparatory studies. He graduated from Tusculum College in June 1870. After this he studied law.

Wilson was admitted to the bar in September 1871 and commenced practice in Barbourville, Kentucky. He was also greatly interested in agricultural pursuits and the construction of the Dixie Highway. He served as member of the Kentucky State Senate from 1883 to 1887. In 1888, Wilson founded the Loyal Order of Moose as a social club.

Wilson was elected as a Republican to the Fifty-first and Fifty-second Congresses (March 4, 1889 – March 3, 1893). He was an unsuccessful candidate for reelection in 1892 to the Fifty-third Congress. He resumed the practice of his profession in Barbourville, Kentucky. He died in Louisville, Kentucky, January 14, 1923. He was interred in Barbourville Cemetery.

U.S. House of Representatives
Preceded by William P. Taulbee	Member of the U.S. House of Representatives from Kentucky's 10th congressional district March 4, 1889 – March 3, 1891 (obsolete district)	Succeeded by John W. Kendall
Preceded by Hugh F. Finley	Member of the U.S. House of Representatives from Kentucky's 11th congressional district March 4, 1891 – March 3, 1893 (obsolete district)	Succeeded by Silas Adams
