= List of United States representatives from Kentucky =

The following is an alphabetical list of United States representatives from the commonwealth of Kentucky. For chronological tables of members of both houses of the United States Congress from the state (through the present day), see Kentucky's congressional delegations. The list of names should be complete as of January 3, 2023, but other data may be incomplete.

== Current members ==
As of January 3, 2025:

- 1st district: James Comer (R) (since 2016)
- 2nd district: Brett Guthrie (R) (since 2009)
- 3rd district: Morgan McGarvey (D) (since 2023)
- 4th district: Thomas Massie (R) (since 2012)
- 5th district: Hal Rogers (R) (since 1981)
- 6th district: Andy Barr (R) (since 2013)

== List of members ==
Member	Party	Years	District	Electoral history
John Adair	Jacksonian	March 4, 1831 – March 3, 1833	7th	Elected in 1831. Retired.
George Madison Adams	Democratic	March 4, 1867 – March 3, 1873	8th	Elected in 1867. Redistricted to the 9th district.
George Madison Adams	Democratic	March 4, 1873 – March 3, 1875	9th	Redistricted from the 8th district and re-elected in 1872. Lost re-election to J.D White.
Green Adams	Whig	March 4, 1847 – March 3, 1849	6th	Elected in 1847. Retired.
Green Adams	Opposition	March 4, 1859 – March 3, 1861	6th	Elected in 1859. Retired.
Silas Adams	Republican	March 4, 1893 – March 3, 1895	11th	Elected in 1892. Lost re-election as an independent.
Chilton Allan	Anti-Jacksonian	March 4, 1831 – March 3, 1833	3rd	Elected in 1831. Redistricted to the 10th district.
Chilton Allan	Anti-Jacksonian	March 4, 1833 – March 3, 1837	10th	Redistricted from the 3rd district and re-elected in 1833. Retired.
Henry Dixon Allen	Democratic	March 4, 1899 – March 3, 1903	2nd	Elected in 1898. Retired.
Lucien Anderson	Unconditional Union	March 4, 1863 – March 3, 1865	1st	Elected in 1863. Retired.
Richard Clough Anderson Jr.	Democratic-Republican	March 4, 1817 – March 3, 1821	8th	Elected in 1816. Retired.
Simeon H. Anderson	Whig	March 4, 1839 – August 11, 1840	5th	Elected in 1839. Died.
William Clayton Anderson	Opposition	March 4, 1859 – March 3, 1861	4th	Elected in 1859. Retired to run for state representative.
Landaff Andrews	Whig	March 4, 1839 – March 3, 1843	11th	Elected in 1839. Redistricted to the 9th district and lost re-election to French.
William Evans Arthur	Democratic	March 4, 1871 – March 3, 1875	6th	Elected in 1870. Retired.
Scotty Baesler	Democratic	January 3, 1993 – January 3, 1999	6th	Elected in 1992. Retired to run for U.S. senator.
Alben W. Barkley	Democratic	March 4, 1913 – March 3, 1927	1st	Elected in 1912. Retired to run for U.S. Senator.
Thomas Barlow	Democratic	January 3, 1993 – January 3, 1995	1st	Elected in 1992. Lost re-election to Whitfield.
Andy Barr	Republican	January 3, 2013 – present	6th	Elected in 2012. Incumbent.
William T. Barry	Democratic-Republican	August 8, 1810 – March 3, 1811	5th	Elected to finish Howard's term. Retired.
Joe B. Bates	Democratic	June 4, 1938 – January 3, 1953	8th	Elected to finish Vinson's term. Lost renomination to W.D. Scalf.
Martin Beaty	Anti-Jacksonian	March 4, 1833 – March 3, 1835	4th	Elected in 1833. Lost re-election to Williams.
James B. Beck	Democratic	March 4, 1867 – March 3, 1875	7th	Elected in 1867. Retired.
William M. Beckner	Democratic	December 3, 1894 – March 3, 1895	10th	Elected to finish Lisle's term. Lost renomination to J.M. Kendall.
George M. Bedinger	Democratic-Republican	March 4, 1803 – March 3, 1807	6th	Elected in 1803. Retired.
Joshua Fry Bell	Whig	March 4, 1845 – March 3, 1847	4th	Elected in 1845. Retired.
Joseph B. Bennett	Republican	March 4, 1905 – March 3, 1911	9th	Elected in 1904. Lost re-election to Fields.
Albert S. Berry	Democratic	March 4, 1893 – March 3, 1901	6th	Elected in 1892. Lost renomination to Gooch.
Joseph C. S. Blackburn	Democratic	March 4, 1875 – March 3, 1885	7th	Elected in 1874. Retired to run for U.S. senator.
Robert E. Lee Blackburn	Republican	March 4, 1929 – March 3, 1931	7th	Elected in 1928. Lost re-election to Chapman.
Andrew Boone	Democratic	March 4, 1875 – March 3, 1879	1st	Elected in 1874. Retired.
Vincent Boreing	Republican	March 4, 1899 – September 16, 1903	11th	Elected in 1898. Died.
Linn Boyd	Jacksonian	March 4, 1835 – March 3, 1837	1st	Elected in 1835. Lost re-election to Murray.
Linn Boyd	Democratic	March 4, 1839 – March 3, 1855	1st	Elected in 1839. Retired.
John Boyle	Democratic-Republican	March 4, 1803 – March 3, 1809	2nd	Elected in 1803. Retired.
Daniel Breck	Whig	March 4, 1849 – March 3, 1851	6th	Elected in 1849. Retired.
James D. Breckinridge	Democratic-Republican	November 21, 1821 – March 3, 1823	8th	Elected to finish Bullock's term. Redistricted to the 9th district and lost re-election to Wickliffe.
John B. Breckinridge	Democratic	January 3, 1973 – January 3, 1979	6th	Elected in 1972. Lost renomination to Tom Easterly.
John C. Breckinridge	Democratic	March 4, 1851 – March 3, 1855	8th	Elected in 1851. Retired.
William Breckinridge	Democratic	March 4, 1885 – March 3, 1895	7th	Elected in 1884. Retired.
Francis Bristow	Whig	December 4, 1854 – March 3, 1855	3rd	Elected to finish Ewing's term Lost re-election to Underwood.
Francis Bristow	Opposition	March 4, 1859 – March 3, 1861	3rd	Elected in 1859. Retired.
John Y. Brown	Democratic	December 3, 1860 – March 3, 1861	5th	Elected in 1859 but did not take seat until 2nd session because did not meet age requirement for office. Retired.
John Y. Brown	Democratic	March 4, 1873 – March 3, 1877	2nd	Elected in 1872. Retired.
John Y. Brown Sr.	Democratic	March 4, 1933 – January 3, 1935	At-large	Elected in 1932. Redistricted to the 3rd district and lost renomination to O'Neal.
William Brown	Democratic-Republican	March 4, 1819 – March 3, 1821	3rd	Elected in 1818. Retired.
Aylette Buckner	Whig	March 4, 1847 – March 3, 1849	4th	Elected in 1847. Lost re-election to Caldwell.
Richard A. Buckner	Democratic-Republican	March 4, 1823 – March 3, 1825	8th	Elected in 1822. Switched parties.
Richard A. Buckner	Anti-Jacksonian	March 4, 1825 – March 3, 1829	8th	Re-elected in 1824 as an Anti-Jacksonian. Retired.
Wingfield Bullock	Democratic-Republican	March 4, 1821 - October 13, 1821	8th	Elected in 1820. Died.
Jim Bunning	Republican	January 3, 1987 – January 3, 1999	4th	Elected in 1986. Retired to run for U.S. senator.
Frank W. Burke	Democratic	January 3, 1959 – January 3, 1963	3rd	Elected in 1958. Lost re-election to Snyder.
Henry Cornelius Burnett	Democratic	March 4, 1855 – December 3, 1861	1st	Elected in 1855. Expelled due to collaborating with the Confederacy.
William Orlando Butler	Democratic	March 4, 1839 – March 3, 1843	13th	Elected in 1839. Retired.
George Caldwell	Democratic	March 4, 1843 – March 3, 1845	4th	Elected in 1843. Retired.
George Caldwell	Democratic	March 4, 1849 – March 3, 1851	4th	Elected in 1849. Retired.
John W. Caldwell	Democratic	March 4, 1877 – March 3, 1883	3rd	Elected in 1876. Retired.
John Calhoon	Anti-Jacksonian	November 5, 1827 – November 7, 1827	11th	Elected to finish Young's term. Resigned due to election contest. (Note: The vote of one county had been thrown out, giving the election to Calhoon. By mutual agreement of both candidates, Calhoon subsequently resigned, and both Calhoon and Chilton petitioned the Governor to call a new election.)
John Calhoon	Anti-Jacksonian	March 4, 1835 – March 3, 1837	6th	Elected in 1835. Switched parties.
John Calhoon	Whig	March 4, 1837 – March 3, 1839	6th	Re-elected in 1837. Retired.
John P. Campbell Jr.	Know Nothing	March 4, 1855 – March 3, 1857	2nd	Elected in 1855. Renominated but declined.
J. Campbell Cantrill	Democratic	March 4, 1909 – September 2, 1923	7th	Elected in 1908. Died.
Cap R. Carden	Democratic	March 4, 1931 – March 3, 1933	4th	Elected in 1930. Redistricted to the at-large district.
Cap R. Carden	Democratic	March 4, 1933 – January 3, 1935	At-large	Redistricted from the 4th district and re-elected in 1932. Redistricted to the 4th district.
Cap R. Carden	Democratic	January 3, 1935 – June 13, 1935	4th	Redistricted from the at-large district and re-elected in 1934. Died.
John Griffin Carlisle	Democratic	March 4, 1877– May 26, 1890	6th	Elected in 1876. Resigned when elected U.S. senator.
Chester O. Carrier	Republican	November 30, 1943 – January 3, 1945	4th	Elected to finish Creal's term. Lost re-election to Chelf.
Tim Lee Carter	Republican	January 3, 1965 – January 3, 1981	5th	Elected in 1964. Retired.
Asher G. Caruth	Democratic	March 4, 1887 – March 3, 1895	5th	Elected in 1886. Lost renomination to E. J. McDermott.
Glover H. Cary	Democratic	March 4, 1931 – March 3, 1933	2nd	Elected in 1930. Redistricted to the at-large district.
Glover H. Cary	Democratic	March 4, 1933 – January 3, 1935	At-large	Redistricted from the 2nd district and re-elected in 1932. Redistricted to the 2nd district.
Glover H. Cary	Democratic	January 3, 1935 – December 5, 1936	2nd	Redistricted from the at-large district and re-elected in 1934. Died.
Samuel L. Casey	Union Democratic	March 10, 1862 – March 3, 1863	1st	Elected to finish Burnett's term. Retired.
John Chambers	Anti-Jacksonian	December 1, 1828 – March 3, 1829	2nd	Elected to finish Metcalfe's term. Retired.
John Chambers	Anti-Jacksonian	March 4, 1835 – March 3, 1837	12th	Elected in 1835. Switched parties.
John Chambers	Whig	March 4, 1837 – March 3, 1839	12th	Re-elected in 1837 as a Whig. Retired.
Ben Chandler	Democratic	February 17, 2004 – January 3, 2013	6th	Elected to finish Fletcher's term. Lost re-election to Barr.
Virgil Chapman	Democratic	March 4, 1925 – March 3, 1929	7th	Elected in 1924. Lost re-election to Blackburn.
Virgil Chapman	Democratic	March 4, 1931 – March 3, 1933	7th	Elected in 1930. Redistricted to the at-large district.
Virgil Chapman	Democratic	March 4, 1933 – January 3, 1935	At-large	Redistricted from the 7th district and re-elected in 1932. Redistricted to the 6th district.
Virgil Chapman	Democratic	January 3, 1935 – January 3, 1949	6th	Redistricted from the at-large district and re-elected in 1934. Retired to run for U.S. senator.
Frank Chelf	Democratic	January 3, 1945 – January 3, 1967	4th	Elected in 1944. Lost re-election to Snyder.
Thomas Chilton	Jacksonian	December 22, 1827 – March 3, 1831	11th	Elected to finish Calhoon's term. Lost re-election to A. Hawes.
Thomas Chilton	Anti-Jacksonian	March 4, 1833 – March 3, 1835	6th	Elected in 1833. Retired.
James Chrisman	Democratic	March 4, 1853 – March 3, 1855	4th	Elected in 1853. Retired.
John Daniel Clardy	Democratic	March 4, 1895 – March 3, 1899	2nd	Elected in 1894. Retired.
James Clark	Democratic-Republican	March 4, 1813 – April 8, 1816	1st	Elected in 1812. Took leave of absence on April 8, 1816, and resigned in August 1816.
James Clark	Anti-Jacksonian	August 1, 1825 – March 3, 1831	3rd	Elected to finish Clay's term. Renominated but declined.
Beverly L. Clarke	Democratic	March 4, 1847 – March 3, 1849	2nd	Elected in 1847. Retired to become a delegate to the state constitutional convention.
John B. Clarke	Democratic	March 4, 1875 – March 3, 1879	10th	Elected in 1874. Retired.
Brutus J. Clay	Union Democratic	March 4, 1863 – March 3, 1865	7th	Elected in 1863. Retired.
Henry Clay	Democratic-Republican	March 4, 1811 – March 3, 1813	5th	Elected in 1810. Redistricted to the 2nd district.
Henry Clay	Democratic-Republican	March 4, 1813 – January 9, 1814	2nd	Redistricted from the 5th district and re-elected in 1812. Resigned to accept a position as diplomatic envoy to Great Britain.
Henry Clay	Democratic-Republican	March 4, 1815 – March 3, 1821	2nd	Elected to finish his vacant term. (Note: Clay was elected in 1814, but the Governor declared the seat vacant as Clay was out of the country.); Retired.
Henry Clay	Democratic-Republican	March 4, 1823 – March 3, 1825	3rd	Elected in 1822. Switched parties.
Henry Clay	Anti-Jacksonian	March 4, 1825 – March 6, 1825	3rd	Re-elected in 1824 as an Anti-Jacksonian. Resigned to become U.S. Secretary of State.
James Brown Clay	Democratic	March 4, 1857 – March 3, 1859	8th	Elected in 1857. Retired.
James Franklin Clay	Democratic	March 4, 1883 – March 3, 1885	2nd	Elected in 1882. Lost renomination to Laffoon.
Earle C. Clements	Democratic	January 3, 1945 – January 6, 1948	2nd	Elected in 1944. Resigned when elected governor.
Nicholas D. Coleman	Jacksonian	March 4, 1829 – March 3, 1831	2nd	Elected in 1829. Retired.
David G. Colson	Republican	March 4, 1895 – March 3, 1899	11th	Elected in 1894. Retired.
James Comer	Republican	November 8, 2016 – present	1st	Elected to finish Whitfield's term. Incumbent.
William O. Cowger	Republican	January 3, 1967 – January 3, 1971	3rd	Elected in 1966. Lost re-election to Mazzoli.
Leander Cox	Whig	March 4, 1853 – March 3, 1855	9th	Elected in 1853. Switched parties.
Leander Cox	Know Nothing	March 4, 1855 – March 3, 1857	9th	Re-elected in 1855 as a Know Nothing candidate. Lost re-election to Mason.
John D. Craddock	Republican	March 4, 1929 – March 3, 1931	4th	Elected in 1928. Lost re-election to Carden.
Edward W. Creal	Democratic	November 5, 1935 – January 3, 1943	4th	Elected to finish Carden's term. Died.
Henry Crist	Democratic-Republican	March 4, 1809 – March 3, 1811	3rd	Elected in 1808. Retired.
John J. Crittenden	Union Democratic	March 4, 1861 – March 3, 1863	8th	Elected in 1861. Renominated but withdrew prior to election.
Edward Crossland	Democratic	March 4, 1871 – March 3, 1875	1st	Elected in 1870. Retired.
William W. Culbertson	Republican	March 4, 1883 – March 3, 1885	9th	Elected in 1882. Retired.
William P. Curlin Jr.	Democratic	December 4, 1971 – January 3, 1973	6th	Elected to finish Watts's term. Retired.
Henry Daniel	Jacksonian	March 4, 1827 – March 3, 1833	1st	Elected in 1827. Lost re-election to C. Lyon.
Amos Davis	Anti-Jacksonian	March 4, 1833 – March 3, 1835	11th	Elected in 1833. Died.
Garrett Davis	Whig	March 4, 1839 – March 3, 1843	12th	Elected in 1839. Redistricted to the 8th district.
Garrett Davis	Whig	March 4, 1843 – March 3, 1847	8th	Redistricted from the 12th district and re-elected in 1843. Retired.
Geoff Davis	Republican	January 3, 2005 – July 31, 2012	4th	Elected in 2004. Resigned due to family health issues.
Thomas Terry Davis	Democratic-Republican	March 4, 1797 – March 3, 1803	1st	Elected in 1797. Retired.
George M. Davison	Republican	March 4, 1897 – March 3, 1899	8th	Elected in 1896. Lost re-election to G. Gilbert.
Joseph Desha	Democratic-Republican	March 4, 1807 – March 3, 1813	6th	Elected in 1806. Redistricted to the 4th district.
Joseph Desha	Democratic-Republican	March 4, 1813 – March 3, 1819	4th	Redistricted from the 6th district and re-elected in 1812. Retired.
William Worth Dickerson	Democratic	June 21, 1890 – March 3, 1893	6th	Elected to finish Carlisle's term. Lost renomination to Berry.
John Lloyd Dorsey Jr.	Democratic	November 4, 1930 – March 3, 1931	2nd	Elected to finish Kincheloe's term. Retired.
Garnett Duncan	Whig	March 4, 1847 – March 3, 1849	7th	Elected in 1847. Retired.
George W. Dunlap	Union Democratic	March 4, 1861 – March 3, 1863	6th	Elected in 1861. Retired.
Milton J. Durham	Democratic	March 4, 1873 – March 3, 1879	8th	Elected in 1872. Lost renomination to P.B. Thompson.
William Pope Duval	Democratic-Republican	March 4, 1813 – March 3, 1815	10th	Elected in 1812. Retired.
Don C. Edwards	Republican	March 4, 1905 – March 3, 1911	11th	Elected in 1904. Lost renomination to Powers.
John Milton Elliott	Democratic	March 4, 1853 – March 3, 1859	6th	Elected in 1853. Retired.
William Thomas Ellis	Democratic	March 4, 1889 – March 3, 1895	2nd	Elected in 1888. Retired.
Walter Evans	Republican	March 4, 1895 – March 3, 1899	5th	Elected in 1894. Lost re-election to O. Turner.
Presley Ewing	Whig	March 4, 1851 – September 27, 1854	3rd	Elected in 1851. Died.
Charles R. Farnsley	Democratic	January 3, 1965 – January 3, 1967	3rd	Elected in 1964. Retired.
William J. Fields	Democratic	March 4, 1911 – December 11, 1923	9th	Elected in 1910. Resigned when elected governor.
Charles Finley	Republican	February 15, 1930 – March 3, 1933	11th	Elected to finish Robsion's term. Retired.
Hugh F. Finley	Republican	March 4, 1887 – March 3, 1891	11th	Elected in 1886. Lost renomination to Wilson.
Thomas Y. Fitzpatrick	Democratic	March 4, 1897 – March 3, 1901	10th	Elected in 1896. Retired.
Ernie Fletcher	Republican	January 3, 1999 – December 8, 2003	6th	Elected in 1998. Resigned after being elected governor.
Thomas Fletcher	Democratic-Republican	December 2, 1816 – March 3, 1817	1st	Elected to finish Clark's term. Retired.
John Fowler	Democratic-Republican	March 4, 1797 – March 3, 1803	2nd	Elected in 1797. Redistricted to the 5th district.
John Fowler	Democratic-Republican	March 4, 1803 – March 3, 1807	5th	Redistricted from the 2nd district and re-elected in 1803. Retired.
Richard French	Jacksonian	March 4, 1835 – March 3, 1837	11th	Elected in 1835. Lost re-election to Menefee.
Richard French	Democratic	March 4, 1843 – March 3, 1845	9th	Elected in 1843. Lost re-election to Trumbo.
Richard French	Democratic	March 4, 1847 – March 3, 1849	9th	Elected in 1847. Retired.
John P. Gaines	Whig	March 4, 1847 – March 3, 1849	10th	Elected in 1847. Lost re-election to Stanton.
Nathan Gaither	Jacksonian	March 4, 1829 – March 3, 1833	8th	Elected in 1829. Redistricted to the 4th district and lost re-election to Beaty.
June W. Gayle	Democratic	January 15, 1900 – March 3, 1901	7th	Elected to finish Settle's term. Retired.
George G. Gilbert	Democratic	March 4, 1899 – March 3, 1907	8th	Elected in 1898. Retired.
Ralph Waldo Emerson Gilbert	Democratic	March 4, 1921 – March 3, 1929	8th	Elected in 1920. Lost re-election to Walker.
Ralph Waldo Emerson Gilbert	Democratic	March 4, 1931 – March 3, 1933	8th	Elected in 1930. Retired.
James S. Golden	Republican	January 3, 1949 – January 3, 1953	9th	Elected in 1948. Redistricted to the 8th district.
James S. Golden	Republican	January 3, 1953 – January 3, 1955	8th	Redistricted from the 9th district and re-elected in 1952. Retired.
Jacob Golladay	Democratic	March 4, 1867 – February 28, 1870	3rd	Elected to finish Hise's term. Resigned.
Daniel Linn Gooch	Democratic	March 4, 1901 – March 3, 1905	6th	Elected in 1900. Lost renomination to Rhinock.
Isaac Goodnight	Democratic	March 4, 1889 – March 3, 1895	3rd	Elected in 1888. Retired.
William J. Graves	Anti-Jacksonian	March 4, 1835 – March 3, 1837	8th	Elected in 1835. Switched parties.
William J. Graves	Whig	March 4, 1837 – March 3, 1841	8th	Re-elected in 1837 as a Whig. Retired.
Willis Green	Whig	March 4, 1839 – March 3, 1843	6th	Elected in 1839. Redistricted to the 2nd district.
Willis Green	Whig	March 4, 1843 – March 3, 1845	2nd	Redistricted from the 6th district and re-elected in 1843. Retired.
Christopher Greenup	Anti-Administration	November 9, 1792 – March 3, 1795	1st	Elected in 1792. Switched parties.
Christopher Greenup	Democratic-Republican	March 4, 1795 – March 3, 1797	1st	Re-elected in 1795 as a Democratic-Republican. Retired.
Noble Jones Gregory	Democratic	January 3, 1937 – January 3, 1959	1st	Elected in 1936. Lost renomination to Stubblefield.
W. Voris Gregory	Democratic	March 4, 1927 – March 3, 1933	1st	Elected in 1926. Redistricted to the at-large district.
W. Voris Gregory	Democratic	March 4, 1933 – January 3, 1935	At-large	Redistricted from the 1st district and re-elected in 1932. Redistricted to the 1st district.
W. Voris Gregory	Democratic	January 3, 1935 – October 10, 1936	1st	Redistricted from the at-large district and re-elected in 1934. Died.
Benjamin E. Grey	Whig	March 4, 1851 – March 3, 1855	2nd	Elected in 1851. Lost re-election to Campbell.
Henry Grider	Whig	March 4, 1843 – March 3, 1847	3rd	Elected in 1843. Retired.
Henry Grider	Union Democratic	March 4, 1861 – March 3, 1865	3rd	Elected in 1861. Swticherd parties.
Henry Grider	Democratic	March 4, 1865 – September 7, 1866	3rd	Re-elected in 1865 as a Democrat. Died.
Asa Grover	Democratic	March 4, 1867 – March 3, 1869	5th	Elected in 1867. Retired.
Brett Guthrie	Republican	January 3, 2009 – present	2nd	Elected in 2008. Incumbent.
John E. Halsell	Democratic	March 4, 1883 – March 3, 1887	3rd	Elected in 1882. Lost renomination to Rhea.
Finley Hamilton	Democratic	March 4, 1933 – January 3, 1935	At-large	Elected in 1932. Retired.
Benjamin Hardin	Democratic-Republican	March 4, 1815 – March 3, 1817	10th	Elected in 1814. Retired.
Benjamin Hardin	Democratic-Republican	March 4, 1819 – March 3, 1823	10th	Elected in 1818. Retired.
Benjamin Hardin	Anti-Jacksonian	March 4, 1833 – March 3, 1837	7th	Elected in 1833. Lost re-election to J. Pope.
Aaron Harding	Union Democratic	March 4, 1861 – March 3, 1865	4th	Elected in 1861. Switched parties.
Aaron Harding	Democratic	March 4, 1865 – March 3, 1867	4th	Re-elected in 1865 as a Democrat. Retired.
James Harlan	Anti-Jacksonian	March 4, 1835 – March 3, 1837	5th	Elected in 1835. Switched parties.
James Harlan	Whig	March 4, 1837 – March 3, 1839	5th	Re-elected in 1837 as a Whig. Retired.
Albert G. Hawes	Jacksonian	March 4, 1831 – March 3, 1833	11th	Elected in 1831. Redistricted to the 2nd district.
Albert G. Hawes	Jacksonian	March 4, 1833 – March 3, 1837	2nd	Redistricted from the 11th district and re-elected in 1833. Retired.
Richard Hawes	Whig	March 4, 1837 – March 3, 1841	10th	Elected in 1837. Retired.
Joseph H. Hawkins	Democratic-Republican	March 29, 1814 – March 3, 1815	2nd	Elected to finish Clay's term. Retired.
Harvey Helm	Democratic	March 4, 1907 – March 3, 1919	8th	Elected in 1906. Re-elected but died before next term began.
John Kerr Hendrick	Democratic	March 4, 1895 – March 3, 1897	1st	Elected in 1894. Lost renomination to Wheeler.
John F. Henry	Anti-Jacksonian	December 11, 1826 – March 3, 1827	12th	Elected finish R. Henry's term. Lost re-election to C. Lyon.
Robert P. Henry	Democratic-Republican	March 4, 1823 – March 3, 1825	12th	Elected in 1822. Switched parties.
Robert P. Henry	Jacksonian	March 4, 1825 – August 25, 1826	12th	Re-elected in 1824 as a Jacksonian. Died.
Clement S. Hill	Whig	March 4, 1853 – March 3, 1855	5th	Elected in 1853. Retired.
Elijah Hise	Democratic	December 3, 1866 – May 8, 1867	3rd	Elected to finish Grider's term. Died.
Francis A. Hopkins	Democratic	March 4, 1903 – March 3, 1907	10th	Elected in 1902. Lost re-election to Langley.
Larry Hopkins	Republican	January 3, 1979 – January 3, 1993	6th	Elected in 1978. Retired.
Nathan T. Hopkins	Republican	February 18, 1897 – March 3, 1897	10th	Won contested election. Retired.
Samuel Hopkins	Democratic-Republican	March 4, 1813 – March 3, 1815	5th	Elected in 1812. Retired.
Benjamin Howard	Democratic-Republican	March 4, 1807 – April 10, 1810	5th	Elected in 1806. Resigned to become Governor of Louisiana and Missouri Territory.
Carroll Hubbard	Democratic	January 3, 1975 – January 3, 1993	1st	Elected in 1974. Lost renomination to Barlow
W. Godfrey Hunter	Republican	March 4, 1887 – March 3, 1889	3rd	Elected in 1886. Lost re-election to Goodnight.
W. Godfrey Hunter	Republican	March 4, 1895 – March 3, 1897	3rd	Elected in 1894. Lost re-election to Rhea.
W. Godfrey Hunter	Republican	November 10, 1903 – March 3, 1905	11th	Elected to finish Boreing's term. Retired.
Harvey Samuel Irwin	Republican	March 4, 1901 – March 3, 1903	5th	Elected in 1900. Lost re-election to Sherley.
James S. Jackson	Union Democratic	March 4, 1861 – December 13, 1861	2nd	Elected in 1861. Resigned to enter the Union Army.
Addison James	Republican	March 4, 1907 – March 3, 1909	3rd	Elected in 1906. Lost re-election to R. Thomas.
Ollie M. James	Democratic	March 4, 1903 – March 3, 1913	1st	Elected in 1902. Retired to run for U.S. Senator.
Joshua Jewett	Democratic	March 4, 1855 – March 3, 1859	5th	Elected in 1855. Lost re-election to Brown as an Opposition Party candidate.
Ben Johnson	Democratic	March 4, 1907 – March 3, 1927	4th	Elected in 1906. Retired.
Francis Johnson	Democratic-Republican	November 13, 1820 – March 3, 1823	6th	Elected to finish Walker's term. Redistricted to the 10th district.
Francis Johnson	Democratic-Republican	March 4, 1823 – March 3, 1825	10th	Redistricted from the 6th district and re-elected in 1822. Switched parties.
Francis Johnson	Anti-Jacksonian	March 4, 1825 – March 3, 1827	10th	Re-elected in 1824 as an Anti-Jacksonian. Lost re-election to Yancey.
James Johnson	Jacksonian	March 4, 1825 – August 13, 1826	5th	Elected in 1824. Died.
James Leeper Johnson	Whig	March 4, 1849 – March 3, 1851	2nd	Elected in 1849. Renominated but declined.
John Telemachus Johnson	Democratic-Republican	March 4, 1821 – March 3, 1823	3rd	Elected in 1820. Redistricted to the 5th district.
John Telemachus Johnson	Democratic-Republican	March 3, 1823 – March 3, 1825	5th	Redistricted from the 3rd district and re-elected in 1822. Retired.
Richard Mentor Johnson	Democratic-Republican	March 4, 1807 – March 3, 1813	4th	Elected in 1806. Redistricted to the 3rd district.
Richard Mentor Johnson	Democratic-Republican	March 4, 1813 – March 3, 1819	3rd	Redistricted from the 4th district and re-elected in 1812. Retired.
Richard Mentor Johnson	Jacksonian	March 4, 1829 – March 3, 1833	5th	Elected in 1829. Redistricted to the 13th district.
Richard Mentor Johnson	Jacksonian	March 4, 1833 – March 3, 1837	13th	Redistricted from the 5th district and re-elected in 1833. Retired to run for Vice President.
Thomas Laurens Jones	Democratic	March 4, 1867 – March 3, 1871	6th	Elected in 1867. Retired.
Thomas Laurens Jones	Democratic	March 4, 1875 – March 3, 1877	6th	Elected in 1874. Retired.
James Nicholas Kehoe	Democratic	March 4, 1901 – March 3, 1905	9th	Elected in 1900. Lost re-election to Bennett.
Elva R. Kendall	Republican	March 4, 1929 – March 3, 1931	9th	Elected in 1928. Lost re-election to Vinson.
John W. Kendall	Democratic	March 4, 1891 – March 7, 1892	10th	Elected in 1890. Died.
Joseph M. Kendall	Democratic	April 21, 1892 – March 3, 1893	10th	Elected to finish his father's term. Retired.
Joseph M. Kendall	Democratic	March 4, 1895 – February 18, 1897	10th	Elected in 1894. Lost contested election to N. Hopkins.
William P. Kimball	Democratic	March 4, 1907 – March 3, 1909	7th	Elected in 1906. Lost renomination to Cantrill.
John Kincaid	Jacksonian	March 4, 1829 – March 3, 1831	7th	Elected in 1829. Retired.
David Hayes Kincheloe	Democratic	March 4, 1915 – October 5, 1930	2nd	Elected in 1914. Resigned when appointed to the U.S. Customs Court.
Andrew Jackson Kirk	Republican	February 13, 1926 – March 3, 1927	10th	Elected to finish Langley's term. Lost renomination to K. Langley.
J. Proctor Knott	Democratic	March 4, 1867 – March 3, 1871	4th	Elected in 1867. Retired.
J. Proctor Knott	Democratic	March 4, 1875 – March 3, 1883	4th	Elected in 1874. Retired.
Polk Laffoon	Democratic	March 4, 1885 – March 3, 1889	2nd	Elected in 1884. Retired.
John W. Langley	Republican	March 4, 1907– January 11, 1926	10th	Elected in 1906. Resigned after conviction for illegally selling alcohol.
Katherine G. Langley	Republican	March 4, 1927 – March 3, 1931	10th	Elected in 1926. Lost re-election to May.
Joseph Lecompte	Jacksonian	March 4, 1825 – March 3, 1833	6th	Elected in 1824. Retired.
Robert P. Letcher	Democratic-Republican	March 4, 1823 – March 3, 1825	4th	Elected in 1822. Switched parties.
Robert P. Letcher	Anti-Jacksonian	March 4, 1825 – March 3, 1833	4th	Re-elected in 1824 as an Anti-Jacksonian. Redistricted to the 5th district.
Robert P. Letcher	Anti-Jacksonian	August 6, 1834 – March 3, 1835	5th	Elected to finish the vacant term. (Note: House declared new election after election was contested.); Retired.
John W. Lewis	Republican	March 4, 1895 – March 3, 1897	4th	Elected in 1894. Lost re-election to D. Smith.
Joseph Horace Lewis	Democratic	May 10, 1870 – March 3, 1873	3rd	Elected to finish Golladay's term Retired.
Ron Lewis	Republican	May 24, 1994 – January 3, 2009	2nd	Elected to finish Natcher's term. Retired.
William Lewis	Republican	April 24, 1948 – January 3, 1949	9th	Elected to finish Robsion's term. Retired.
Marcus C. Lisle	Democratic	March 4, 1893 – July 7, 1894	10th	Elected in 1892. Died.
James Love	Anti-Jacksonian	March 4, 1833 – March 3, 1835	9th	Elected in 1833. Renominated but declined.
Ken Lucas	Democratic	January 3, 1999 – January 3, 2005	4th	Elected in 1998. Retired.
Chittenden Lyon	Jacksonian	March 4, 1827 – March 3, 1833	12th	Elected in 1827. Redistricted to the 1st district.
Chittenden Lyon	Jacksonian	March 4, 1833 – March 3, 1835	1st	Redistricted from the 12th district and re-elected in 1833. Retired.
Matthew Lyon	Democratic-Republican	March 4, 1803 – March 3, 1811	1st	Elected in 1803. Lost re-election to New.
Robert Mallory	Opposition	March 4, 1859 – March 3, 1861	7th	Elected in 1859. Switched parties.
Robert Mallory	Union Democratic	March 4, 1861 – March 3, 1863	7th	Re-elected in 1861 as a Unionist. Redistricted to the 5th district.
Robert Mallory	Union Democratic	March 4, 1863 – March 3, 1865	5th	Redistricted from the 7th district and re-elected in 1863. Lost re-election to Rousseau.
Alexander Marshall	Know Nothing	March 4, 1855 – March 3, 1857	8th	Elected in 1855. Retired.
Humphrey Marshall	Whig	March 4, 1849 – August 4, 1852	7th	Elected in 1849. Resigned to become U.S. Minister to China.
Humphrey Marshall	Know Nothing	March 4, 1855 – March 3, 1859	7th	Elected in 1855. Renominated but declined.
Thomas A. Marshall	Anti-Jacksonian	March 4, 1831 – March 3, 1833	2nd	Elected in 1831. Redistricted to the 12th district.
Thomas A. Marshall	Anti-Jacksonian	March 4, 1833 – March 3, 1835	12th	Redistricted from the 2nd district and re-elected in 1833. Lost re-election to Chambers.
Thomas Francis Marshall	Whig	March 4, 1841 – March 3, 1843	10th	Elected in 1841. Retired.
John Preston Martin	Democratic	March 4, 1845 – March 3, 1847	6th	Elected in 1845. Retired.
John C. Mason	Democratic	March 4, 1849 – March 3, 1853	9th	Elected in 1849. Retired.
John C. Mason	Democratic	March 4, 1857 – March 3, 1859	9th	Elected in 1857. Retired.
Thomas Massie	Republican	November 6, 2012 – present	4th	Elected to finish Davis's term. Incumbent.
Andrew J. May	Democratic	March 4, 1931 – March 3, 1933	10th	Elected in 1930. Redistricted to the at-large district.
Andrew J. May	Democratic	March 4, 1933 – January 3, 1935	At-large	Redistricted from the 10th district and re-elected in 1932. Redistricted to the 7th district.
Andrew J. May	Democratic	January 3, 1935 – January 3, 1947	7th	Redistricted from the at-large district and re-elected in 1934. Lost re-election to Meade.
Romano L. Mazzoli	Democratic	January 3, 1971 – January 3, 1995	3rd	Elected in 1970. Retired.
James B. McCreary	Democratic	March 4, 1885 – March 3, 1897	8th	Elected in 1884. Lost renomination to John B. Thompson.
Morgan McGarvey	Democratic	January 3, 2022 – present	3rd	Elected in 2022. Incumbent.
Robert L. McHatton	Jacksonian	December 7, 1826 – March 3, 1829	5th	Elected to finish Johnson's term. Retired.
Henry D. McHenry	Democratic	March 4, 1871 – March 3, 1873	2nd	Elected in 1870. Retired.
John H. McHenry	Whig	March 4, 1845 – March 3, 1847	2nd	Elected in 1845. Renominated but withdrew prior to election.
Samuel McKee	Democratic-Republican	March 4, 1809 – March 3, 1813	2nd	Elected in 1808. Redistricted to the 7th district.
Samuel McKee	Democratic-Republican	March 4, 1813 – March 3, 1817	7th	Redistricted from the 2nd district and re-elected in 1812. Retired.
Samuel McKee	Unconditional Union	March 4, 1865 – March 3, 1867	9th	Elected in 1865. Lost re-election to J. Young.
Samuel McKee	Republican	June 22, 1868 – March 3, 1869	9th	Won contested election. (Note: Young was elected in 1867 but his election was overturned due to voter intimidation and fraud.); Retired.
James A. McKenzie	Democratic	March 4, 1877 – March 3, 1883	2nd	Elected in 1876. Lost renomination to J.F. Clay.
Alney McLean	Democratic-Republican	March 4, 1815 – March 3, 1817	5th	Elected in 1814. Retired.
Alney McLean	Democratic-Republican	March 4, 1819 – March 3, 1821	5th	Elected in 1818. Retired.
Finis McLean	Whig	March 4, 1849 – March 3, 1851	3rd	Elected in 1849. Retired.
Wendell H. Meade	Republican	January 3, 1947 – January 3, 1949	7th	Elected in 1946. Lost re-election to Perkins.
Richard Menefee	Whig	March 4, 1837 – March 3, 1839	11th	Elected in 1837. Retired.
John W. Menzies	Union Democratic	March 4, 1861 – March 3, 1863	10th	Elected in 1861. Redistricted to the 6th district and lost re-election to G. Smith.
Thomas Metcalfe	Democratic-Republican	March 4, 1819 – March 3, 1823	4th	Elected in 1818. Redistricted to the 2nd district.
Thomas Metcalfe	Democratic-Republican	March 4, 1823 – March 3, 1825	2nd	Redistricted from the 4th district and re-elected in 1822. Switched parties.
Thomas Metcalfe	Anti-Jacksonian	March 4, 1825 – June 1, 1828	2nd	Re-elected in 1824 as an Anti-Jacksonian. Resigned to run for governor.
Charles W. Milliken	Democratic	March 4, 1873 – March 3, 1877	3rd	Elected in 1872. Retired.
Alexander B. Montgomery	Democratic	March 4, 1887 – March 3, 1895	4th	Elected in 1886. Lost re-election to J. Lewis.
Thomas Montgomery	Democratic-Republican	March 4, 1813 – March 3, 1815	9th	Elected in 1812. Lost re-election to Taul.
Thomas Montgomery	Democratic-Republican	August 1, 1820 – March 3, 1823	9th	Elected to finish Quarles's term. Retired.
John William Moore	Democratic	December 26, 1925 – March 3, 1929	3rd	Elected to finish Thomas's term. Lost re-election to Roark.
John William Moore	Democratic	June 1, 1929 – March 3, 1933	3rd	Elected to finish Roark's term. Retired.
Laban T. Moore	Opposition	March 4, 1859 – March 3, 1861	9th	Elected in 1859. Retired.
Thomas P. Moore	Democratic-Republican	March 4, 1823 – March 3, 1825	7th	Elected in 1822. Switched parties.
Thomas P. Moore	Jacksonian	March 4, 1825 – March 3, 1829	7th	Re-elected in 1824 as a Jacksonian. Retired.
Henry D. Moorman	Democratic	March 4, 1927 – March 3, 1929	4th	Elected in 1926. Lost re-election to Craddock.
Charles S. Morehead	Whig	March 4, 1847 – March 3, 1851	8th	Elected in 1847. Retired.
Joseph W. Morris	Democratic	November 30, 1923 – March 3, 1925	7th	Elected to finish Cantrill's term. Retired.
Thruston Ballard Morton	Republican	January 3, 1947 – January 3, 1953	3rd	Elected in 1946. Retired.
J. McKenzie Moss	Republican	March 25, 1902 – March 3, 1903	3rd	Won contested election. Lost re-election.
John L. Murray	Democratic	March 4, 1837 – March 3, 1839	1st	Elected in 1837. Retired.
William Huston Natcher	Democratic	August 1, 1953 – March 29, 1994	2nd	Elected to finish Wither's term. Died.
Anthony New	Democratic-Republican	March 4, 1811 – March 3, 1813	1st	Elected in 1810. Retired.
Anthony New	Democratic-Republican	March 4, 1817 – March 3, 1819	5th	Elected in 1816. Retired.
Anthony New	Democratic-Republican	March 4, 1821 – March 3, 1823	5th	Elected in 1820. Retired.
J. Lincoln Newhall	Republican	March 4, 1929 – March 3, 1931	6th	Elected in 1928. Lost re-election to Spence.
Anne Northup	Republican	January 3, 1997 – January 3, 2007	3rd	Elected in 1996. Lost re-election to Yarmuth.
Emmet O'Neal	Democratic	January 3, 1935 – January 3, 1947	3rd	Elected in 1934. Lost re-election to Morton.
Charles F. Ogden	Republican	March 4, 1919 – March 3, 1923	5th	Elected in 1918. Retired.
Stephen Ormsby	Democratic-Republican	March 4, 1811 – March 3, 1813	3rd	Elected in 1810. Redistricted to the 8th district and lost re-election to John Simpson.
Stephen Ormsby	Democratic-Republican	April 20, 1813 – March 3, 1817	8th	Elected to finish representative-elect John Simpson's term. Lost re-election to R. Anderson.
Alexander D. Orr	Anti-Administration	November 8, 1792 – March 3, 1795	2nd	Elected in 1792. Switched parties.
Alexander D. Orr	Democratic-Republican	March 4, 1795 – March 3, 1797	2nd	Re-elected in 1795 as a Democratic-Republican. Retired.
William Claiborne Owens	Democratic	March 4, 1895 – March 3, 1897	7th	Elected in 1894. Retired.
Bryan Owsley	Whig	March 4, 1841 – March 3, 1843	4th	Elected in 1841. Lost re-election to G. Caldwell.
Edward Y. Parsons	Democratic	March 4, 1875 – July 8, 1876	5th	Elected in 1874. Died.
Thomas H. Paynter	Democratic	March 4, 1889 – January 5, 1895	9th	Elected in 1888. Retired and resigned when elected to the Kentucky Court of Appeals.
Carl C. Perkins	Democratic	November 6, 1984 – January 3, 1993	7th	Elected to finish his father's term. Retired.
Carl D. Perkins	Democratic	January 3, 1949 – August 3, 1984	7th	Elected in 1948. Died.
Samuel Peyton	Democratic	March 4, 1847 – March 3, 1849	3rd	Elected in 1847. Lost re-election to McLean.
Samuel Peyton	Democratic	March 4, 1857 – March 3, 1861	2nd	Elected in 1857. Lost renomination.
Elijah Phister	Democratic	March 4, 1879 – March 3, 1883	10th	Elected in 1878. Retired.
John Pope	Whig	March 4, 1837 – March 3, 1843	7th	Elected in 1837. Redistricted to the 5th district and lost re-election to Stone as an independent.
Patrick H. Pope	Jacksonian	March 4, 1833 – March 3, 1835	8th	Elected in 1833. Lost re-election to Graves.
Caleb Powers	Republican	March 4, 1911 – March 3, 1919	11th	Elected in 1910. Retired.
William Preston	Whig	December 6, 1852 – March 3, 1855	7th	Elected to finish Marshall's term. Lost re-election to Marshall.
Samuel Johnson Pugh	Republican	March 4, 1895 – March 3, 1901	9th	Elected in 1894. Lost re-election to Kehoe.
Tunstall Quarles	Democratic-Republican	March 4, 1817 – June 15, 1820	9th	Elected in 1816. Resigned.
William H. Randall	Unconditional Union	March 4, 1863 – March 3, 1867	8th	Elected in 1863. Retired.
William B. Read	Democratic	March 4, 1871 – March 3, 1875	4th	Elected in 1870. Retired.
John S. Rhea	Democratic	March 4, 1897– March 25, 1902	3rd	Elected in 1896. Lost contested election to Moss.
John S. Rhea	Democratic	March 4, 1903 – March 3, 1905	3rd	Elected in 1902. Retired.
Joseph L. Rhinock	Democratic	March 4, 1905 – March 3, 1911	6th	Elected in 1904. Retired.
John McConnell Rice	Democratic	March 4, 1869 – March 3, 1873	9th	Elected in 1868. Retired.
James M. Richardson	Democratic	March 4, 1905 – March 3, 1907	3rd	Elected in 1904. Lost re-election to A. James.
Burwell C. Ritter	Democratic	March 4, 1865 – March 3, 1867	2nd	Elected in 1865. Retired.
Charles W. Roark	Republican	March 4, 1929 - April 5, 1929	3rd	Elected in 1928. Died.
George Robertson	Democratic-Republican	March 4, 1817 – ??, 1821	7th	Elected in 1816. Resigned before the convening of Congress.
Thomas A. Robertson	Democratic	March 4, 1883 – March 3, 1887	4th	Elected in 1882. Lost renomination to Montgomery.
John M. Robsion	Republican	March 4, 1919 – January 10, 1930	11th	Elected in 1918. Resigned when appointed U.S. Senator.
John M. Robsion	Republican	January 3, 1935 – February 17, 1948	9th	Elected in 1934. Died.
John M. Robsion Jr.	Republican	January 3, 1953 – January 3, 1959	3rd	Elected in 1952. Lost re-election to Burke.
Hal Rogers	Republican	January 3, 1981 – present	5th	Elected in 1980. Incumbent.
Arthur B. Rouse	Democratic	March 4, 1911 – March 3, 1927	6th	Elected in 1910. Retired.
Lovell Rousseau	Unconditional Union	March 4, 1865 – July 21, 1866	5th	Elected in 1865. Resigned following his assault of Rep. Josiah Grinnell.
Lovell Rousseau	Unconditional Union	December 3, 1866 – March 3, 1867	5th	Elected to finish his own term. Lost re-election to Grover.
John Rowan	Democratic-Republican	March 4, 1807 – March 3, 1809	3rd	Elected in 1806. Retired.
Edward Rumsey	Whig	March 4, 1837 – March 3, 1839	2nd	Elected in 1837. Retired.
Thomas Sandford	Democratic-Republican	March 4, 1803 – March 3, 1807	4th	Elected in 1803. Lost re-election to R. Johnson.
Evan E. Settle	Democratic	March 4, 1897 – November 16, 1899	7th	Elected in 1896. Died.
George S. Shanklin	Democratic	March 4, 1865 – March 3, 1867	7th	Elected in 1865. Retired.
Solomon P. Sharp	Democratic-Republican	March 4, 1813 – March 3, 1817	6th	Elected in 1812. Lost re-election to D. Walker.
J. Swagar Sherley	Democratic	March 4, 1903 – March 3, 1919	5th	Elected in 1902. Lost re-election to Ogden.
Eugene Siler	Republican	January 3, 1955 – January 3, 1963	8th	Elected in 1954. Redistricted to the 5th district.
Eugene Siler	Republican	January 3, 1963 – January 3, 1965	5th	Redistricted from the 8th district and re-elected in 1962. Retired.
William E. Simms	Democratic	March 4, 1859 – March 3, 1861	8th	Elected in 1859. Lost re-election to Crittenden.
David Highbaugh Smith	Democratic	March 4, 1897 – March 3, 1907	4th	Elected in 1896. Retired.
Green Clay Smith	Unconditional Union	March 4, 1863 – July, 1866	6th	Elected in 1863. Resigned after being appointed Governor of Montana Territory.
John Speed Smith	Democratic-Republican	August 6, 1821 – March 3, 1823	7th	Elected to finish Robertson's term. Redistricted to the 4th district and lost re-election to Letcher.
Gene Snyder	Republican	January 3, 1963 – January 3, 1965	3rd	Elected in 1962. Lost re-election to Farnsley.
Gene Snyder	Republican	January 3, 1967 – January 3, 1987	4th	Elected in 1966. Retired.
William W. Southgate	Whig	March 4, 1837 – March 3, 1839	13th	Elected in 1837. Lost re-election to Butler.
Thomas Speed	Democratic-Republican	March 4, 1817 – March 3, 1819	10th	Elected in 1816. Retired.
Brent Spence	Democratic	March 4, 1931 – March 3, 1933	6th	Elected in 1930. Redistricted to the at-large district.
Brent Spence	Democratic	March 4, 1933 – January 3, 1935	At-large	Redistricted from the 6th district and re-elected in 1932. Redistricted to the 5th district.
Brent Spence	Democratic	January 3, 1935 – January 3, 1963	5th	Redistricted from the at-large district and re-elected in 1934. Retired.
James Sprigg	Whig	March 4, 1841 – March 3, 1843	8th	Elected in 1841. Redistricted to the 7th district and lost re-election to Thomasson as an independent.
Elisha Standiford	Democratic	March 4, 1873 – March 3, 1875	5th	Elected in 1872. Renominated but declined.
Augustus O. Stanley	Democratic	March 4, 1903 – March 3, 1915	2nd	Elected in 1902. Retired to run for U.S. senator.
Richard H. Stanton	Democratic	March 4, 1849 – March 3, 1855	10th	Elected in 1849. Lost re-election to S. Swope.
John W. Stevenson	Democratic	March 4, 1857 – March 3, 1861	10th	Elected in 1857. Lost re-election to Menzies.
James W. Stone	Democratic	March 4, 1843 – March 3, 1845	5th	Elected in 1843. Lost re-election to Young.
James W. Stone	Democratic	March 4, 1851 – March 3, 1853	5th	Elected in 1851. Lost re-election to Hill.
William Johnson Stone	Democratic	March 4, 1885 – March 3, 1895	1st	Elected in 1884. Retired.
Frank Stubblefield	Democratic	January 3, 1959 – December 31, 1974	1st	Elected in 1958. Lost renomination to Hubbard and resigned early.
William N. Sweeney	Democratic	March 4, 1869 – March 3, 1871	2nd	Elected in 1868. Renominated but declined.
King Swope	Republican	August 1, 1919 – March 3, 1921	8th	Elected to finish Helm's term. Lost re-election to R. Gilbert.
Samuel F. Swope	Know Nothing	March 4, 1855 – March 3, 1857	10th	Elected in 1855. Retired.
Albert G. Talbott	Democratic	March 4, 1855 – March 3, 1859	4th	Elected in 1855. Retired.
Micah Taul	Democratic-Republican	March 4, 1815 – March 3, 1817	9th	Elected in 1814. Retired.
William P. Taulbee	Democratic	March 4, 1885 – March 3, 1889	10th	Elected in 1884. Retired.
Maurice Thatcher	Republican	March 4, 1923 – March 3, 1933	5th	Elected in 1922. Retired to run for U.S. senator.
George M. Thomas	Republican	March 4, 1887 – March 3, 1889	9th	Elected in 1886. Retired.
Robert Y. Thomas Jr.	Democratic	March 4, 1909 – September 3, 1925	3rd	Elected in 1908. Died.
William Thomasson	Whig	March 4, 1843 – March 3, 1847	7th	Elected in 1843. Retired.
John Burton Thompson	Whig	December 7, 1840 – March 3, 1843	5th	Elected to finish Anderson's term. Retired.
John Burton Thompson	Whig	March 4, 1847 – March 3, 1851	5th	Elected in 1847. Retired.
Philip Thompson	Democratic-Republican	March 4, 1823 – March 3, 1825	11th	Elected in 1822. Retired.
Philip B. Thompson Jr.	Democratic	March 4, 1879 – March 3, 1885	8th	Elected in 1878. Retired.
John W. Tibbatts	Democratic	March 4, 1843 – March 3, 1847	10th	Elected in 1843. Retired.
Christopher Tompkins	Anti-Jacksonian	March 4, 1831 – March 3, 1833	10th	Elected in 1831. Redistricted to the 3rd district.
Christopher Tompkins	Anti-Jacksonian	March 4, 1833 – March 3, 1835	3rd	Redistricted from the 10th district and re-elected in 1833. Retired to run for state representative.
David Trimble	Democratic-Republican	March 4, 1817 – March 3, 1825	1st	Elected in 1816. Switched parties.
David Trimble	Anti-Jacksonian	March 4, 1825 – March 3, 1827	1st	Re-elected in 1824 as an Anti-Jacksonian. Lost re-election to Daniel.
Lawrence S. Trimble	Democratic	March 4, 1865 – March 3, 1871	1st	Elected in 1865. Lost renomination to Crossland.
South Trimble	Democratic	March 4, 1901 – March 3, 1907	7th	Elected in 1900. Retired to run for lieutenant governor.
Philip Triplett	Whig	March 4, 1839 – March 3, 1843	2nd	Elected in 1839. Retired.
Andrew Trumbo	Whig	March 4, 1845 – March 3, 1847	9th	Elected in 1845. Retired.
Oscar Turner	Independent Democratic	March 4, 1879 – March 3, 1881	1st	Elected in 1878. Joined Democratic Party.
Oscar Turner	Democratic	March 4, 1881 – March 3, 1883	1st	Re-elected in 1880 as a Democrat. Left Democratic Party.
Oscar Turner	Independent Democratic	March 4, 1883 – March 3, 1885	1st	Re-elected in 1882 as an Independent Democrat. Retired.
Oscar Turner	Democratic	March 4, 1899 – March 3, 1901	5th	Elected in 1898. Retired.
Thomas Turner	Democratic	March 4, 1877 – March 3, 1881	9th	Elected in 1876. Lost re-election to J.D. White.
Joseph R. Underwood	Anti-Jacksonian	March 4, 1835 – March 3, 1837	3rd	Elected in 1835. Switched parties.
Joseph R. Underwood	Whig	March 4, 1837 – March 3, 1843	3rd	Re-elected in 1837 as a Whig. Retired.
Thomas R. Underwood	Democratic	January 3, 1949 – March 17, 1951	6th	Elected in 1948. Resigned when appointed U.S. senator.
Warner Underwood	Know Nothing	March 4, 1855 – March 3, 1859	3rd	Elected in 1855. Retired.
Beverly M. Vincent	Democratic	March 2, 1937 – January 3, 1945	2nd	Elected to finish Cary's term. Retired.
Fred M. Vinson	Democratic	January 24, 1924 – March 3, 1929	9th	Elected to finish Fields's term. Lost re-election to Kendall.
Fred M. Vinson	Democratic	March 4, 1931 – March 3, 1933	9th	Elected in 1930. Redistricted to the at-large district.
Fred M. Vinson	Democratic	March 4, 1933 – January 3, 1935	At-large	Redistricted from the 9th district and re-elected in 1932. Redistricted to the 8th district.
Fred M. Vinson	Democratic	January 3, 1935 – May 27, 1938	8th	Redistricted from the at-large district and re-elected in 1934. Resigned to become Associate Judge of the U.S. Court of Appeals for the District of Columbia Circuit.
William H. Wadsworth	Union Democratic	March 4, 1861 – March 3, 1865	9th	Elected in 1861. Retired.
William H. Wadsworth	Republican	March 4, 1885 – March 3, 1887	9th	Elected in 1884. Retired.
David Walker	Democratic-Republican	March 4, 1817 – March 1, 1820	6th	Elected in 1816. Died.
Lewis L. Walker	Republican	March 4, 1929 – March 3, 1931	8th	Elected in 1928. Retired.
Matthew Walton	Democratic-Republican	March 4, 1803 – March 3, 1807	3rd	Elected in 1803. Retired.
Andrew H. Ward	Democratic	December 3, 1866 – March 3, 1867	6th	Elected to finish Smith's term. Retired.
Mike Ward	Democratic	January 3, 1995 – January 3, 1997	3rd	Elected in 1994. Lost re-election to Northup.
William T. Ward	Whig	March 4, 1851 – March 3, 1853	4th	Elected in 1851. Retired.
Orie S. Ware	Democratic	March 4, 1927 – March 3, 1929	6th	Elected in 1926. Retired.
Henry Watterson	Democratic	August 12, 1876 – March 3, 1877	5th	Elected to finish Parsons's term. Retired.
John C. Watts	Democratic	April 4, 1951 – September 24, 1971	6th	Elected to finish Underwood's term. Died.
Charles K. Wheeler	Democratic	March 4, 1897 – March 3, 1903	1st	Elected in 1896. Retired.
John A. Whitaker	Democratic	April 17, 1948 – December 15, 1951	2nd	Elected to finish Clements's term. Died.
Addison White	Whig	March 4, 1851 – March 3, 1853	6th	Elected in 1851. Retired.
David White	Democratic-Republican	March 4, 1823 – March 3, 1825	6th	Elected in 1822. Retired.
James Bamford White	Democratic	March 4, 1901 – March 3, 1903	10th	Elected in 1900. Retired.
John White	Anti-Jacksonian	March 4, 1835 – March 3, 1837	9th	Elected in 1835. Switched parties.
John White	Whig	March 4, 1837 – March 3, 1843	9th	Re-elected in 1837 as a Whig. Redistricted to the 6th district.
John White	Whig	March 4, 1843 – March 3, 1845	6th	Redistricted from the 9th district and re-elected in 1843. Retired.
John D. White	Republican	March 4, 1875 – March 3, 1877	9th	Elected in 1874. Retired.
John D. White	Republican	March 4, 1881 – March 3, 1883	9th	Elected in 1880. Redistricted to the 10th district.
John D. White	Republican	March 4, 1883 – March 3, 1885	10th	Redistricted from the 9th district and re-elected in 1882. Retired.
Ed Whitfield	Republican	January 3, 1995 – September 6, 2016	1st	Elected in 1994. Retired and resigned early.
Charles A. Wickliffe	Democratic-Republican	March 4, 1823 – March 3, 1825	9th	Elected in 1822. Switched parties.
Charles A. Wickliffe	Jacksonian	March 4, 1825 – March 3, 1833	9th	Re-elected in 1824 as a Jacksonian. Retired.
Charles A. Wickliffe	Union Democratic	March 4, 1861 – March 3, 1863	5th	Elected in 1861. Retired.
Sherrod Williams	Anti-Jacksonian	March 4, 1835 – March 3, 1837	4th	Elected in 1835. Switched parties.
Sherrod Williams	Whig	March 4, 1837 – March 3, 1841	4th	Re-elected in 1837 as a Whig. Retired.
Albert S. Willis	Democratic	March 4, 1877 – March 3, 1887	5th	Elected in 1876. Lost renomination to Caruth.
John H. Wilson	Republican	March 4, 1889 – March 3, 1891	10th	Elected in 1888. Redistricted to the 11th district.
John H. Wilson	Republican	March 4, 1891 – March 3, 1893	11th	Redistricted from the 10th district and re-elected in 1890. Retired.
Boyd Winchester	Democratic	March 4, 1869 – March 3, 1873	5th	Elected in 1868. Retired.
Garrett L. Withers	Democratic	August 2, 1952 – April 30, 1953	2nd	Elected to finish Whitaker's term. Died.
Frank L. Wolford	Democratic	March 4, 1883 – March 3, 1887	11th	Elected in 1882. Lost re-election to H. Finley.
Samuel H. Woodson	Democratic-Republican	March 4, 1821 – March 3, 1823	2nd	Elected in 1820. Redistricted to the 7th district and lost re-election to T. Moore.
Joel Yancey	Jacksonian	March 4, 1827 – March 3, 1831	10th	Elected in 1827. Lost re-election to Tompkins.
John Yarmuth	Democratic	January 3, 2007 – January 3, 2023	3rd	Elected in 2006. Retired.
George Helm Yeaman	Union Democratic	December 1, 1862 – March 3, 1865	2nd	Elected to finish Jackson's term. Lost re-election to Ritter.
Bryan Rust Young	Whig	March 4, 1845 – March 3, 1847	5th	Elected in 1845. Retired.
John Duncan Young	Democratic	March 4, 1873 – March 3, 1875	10th	Elected in 1872. Retired.
William Singleton Young	Anti-Jacksonian	March 4, 1825 – September 20, 1827	11th	Elected in 1824. Died.

== See also ==
- List of Confederate representatives from Kentucky
- List of United States senators from Kentucky
- Kentucky's congressional delegations
- Kentucky's congressional districts

== Sources ==
House of Representatives List of Members
