= 1943 United States House of Representatives elections =

There were elections in 1943 to the United States House of Representatives:

District	Incumbent			This race	
District	Member	Party	First elected	Results	Candidates
Missouri 6	Vacant			Incumbent Philip A. Bennett (R) died in previous Congress. New member elected January 12, 1943. Republican hold.	▌ ✓ Marion T. Bennett (Republican) 62.90%; ▌Sam M. Wear (Democratic) 37.10%
California 2	Harry L. Englebright	Republican	1926 (special)	Incumbent died May 13, 1943. New member elected August 31, 1943. Democratic gain.	▌ ✓ Clair Engle (Democratic) 39.82%; ▌Grace Englebright (Republican) 33.56%; ▌Jesse M. Mayo (Republican) 26.61%
Kansas 2	U. S. Guyer	Republican	1924 (special); 1924 (retired); 1926	Incumbent died June 5, 1943. New member elected September 14, 1943. Republican hold.	▌ ✓ Errett P. Scrivner (Republican) 69.09%; ▌Herbert L. Drake (Democratic) 30.91%
New York 32	Francis D. Culkin	Republican	1928 (special)	Incumbent died August 4, 1943. New member elected November 2, 1943. Republican hold.	▌ ✓ Hadwen C. Fuller (Republican) 73.33%; ▌Norman G. Ward (Democratic) 26.67%
Pennsylvania 23	James E. Van Zandt	Republican	1938	Incumbent resigned September 24, 1943, after being called to active duty in the US Armed Forces. New member elected November 2, 1943. Republican hold.	▌ ✓ D. Emmert Brumbaugh (Republican) 59.40%; ▌Edna Marsden (Democratic) 40.60%
Kentucky 4	Edward W. Creal	Democratic	1935 (special)	Incumbent died October 13, 1943. New member elected November 30, 1943. Republican gain.	▌ ✓ Chester O. Carrier (Republican) 63.42%; ▌J. Dan Talbott (Democratic) 36.58%
