= Kentucky's 4th congressional district =

U.S. House district for Kentucky

Coordinates: 38°33′57″N 84°25′40″W

- Interactive map of district boundaries since January 3, 2023
- Representative: Thomas Massie; R–Garrison
- Distribution: 68.2% urban; 31.8% rural
- Population (2025): 788,925
- Median household income: $83,986
- Ethnicity: 86.6% White; 4.2% Hispanic; 4.1% Two or more races; 3.4% Black; 1.1% Asian; 0.5% other
- Cook PVI: R+18

Kentucky's 4th congressional district is a congressional district in the U.S. state of Kentucky. Located in the northeastern portion of the state, it is a long district that follows the Ohio River. However, the district is dominated by its far western portion, comprising the eastern suburbs of Louisville and Northern Kentucky, the Kentucky side of the Cincinnati area. It is the richest congressional district in the state of Kentucky.

The majority of voters live in the suburban Cincinnati counties of Boone, Kenton, and Campbell, which includes such suburbs as Fort Mitchell, Covington, Florence, Newport, and Fort Thomas. The next-largest population center is the northeastern suburbs of Louisville. It stretches as far south as northern portions of the city of Bardstown.

The district is currently represented by Republican Thomas Massie, who was elected in a special election in 2012 to succeed Republican Geoff Davis, who resigned on July 31, 2012, citing family concerns. In the 2026 midterm elections, Massie lost the Republican primary to Ed Gallrein, who was supported by President Donald Trump; Gallrein won the general election and will represent the district in the 120th Congress.

== Characteristics ==
The 4th was one of the first areas of Kentucky to turn Republican outside of traditionally Republican south-central Kentucky; it has been in GOP hands for all but six years since 1967. Its politics are dominated by Republicans in the wealthy Cincinnati suburbs, which have swelled with former Cincinnati residents since the early 1960s. Between them, Boone, Kenton and Campbell counties have as many people as the rest of the district combined. As a measure of how much the Cincinnati suburbs have dominated the district, when Massie took office, he became the first congressman from the district's eastern portion in 45 years. Nonetheless, Democrats still hold state and local offices in rural counties.

== Voter registration ==
On January 1, 2026, the district had 596,737 registered voters, who were registered with the following parties.

Party	Registration	
Party	Voters	%
Republican	308,742	51.74
Democratic	205,435	34.43
Independent	36,398	6.10
Libertarian	3,438	0.58
Green	490	0.08
Constitution	271	0.05
Socialist Workers	130	0.02
Reform	38	0.01
"Other"	41,795	7.00
Total	596,737	100.00

== Recent election results from statewide races ==
Year	Office	Results
2008	President	McCain 61–37%
2012	President	Romney 65–35%
2016	President	Trump 66–29%
2016	Senate	Paul 66–34%
2019	Governor	Bevin 53–45%
2019	Attorney General	Cameron 63–37%
2020	President	Trump 65–33%
2020	Senate	McConnell 61–35%
2022	Senate	Paul 66–34%
2023	Governor	Cameron 52–48%
2023	Attorney General	Coleman 62–38%
2023	Auditor of Public Accounts	Ball 64–36%
2023	Secretary of State	Adams 63–37%
2023	Treasurer	Metcalf 62–38%
2024	President	Trump 67–31%

== Composition ==
For the 118th and successive Congresses (based on redistricting following the 2020 census), the district contains all or portions of the following counties and communities:

Boone County (11)

All 11 communities

Bracken County (3)

All 3 communities

Campbell County (16)

All 16 communities

Carroll County (5)

All 5 communities

Carter County (0)

No municipalities or census-recognized communities

Gallatin County (3)

All 3 communities

Grant County (4)

All 4 communities

Greenup County (8)

All 8 communities

Harrison County (2)

Berry, Cynthiana

Henry County (5)

All 5 communities

Kenton County (16)

All 16 communities

Lewis County (3)

All 3 communities

Mason County (5)

All 5 communities

Nelson County (4)

Bardstown (part; also 2nd), Bloomfield, Chaplin, Fairfield

Oldham County (9)

All 9 communities

Owen County (4)

All 4 communities

Pendleton County (2)

Butler, Falmouth

Robertson County (2)

Mount Olivet, Sardis (shared with Mason County)

Shelby County (3)

All 3 communities

Spencer County (2)

Elk Creek, Taylorsville

Trimble County (2)

Bedford, Milton

== List of members representing the district ==
Member	Party	Years	Cong ress	Electoral history	Location
District created March 4, 1803
Thomas Sandford	Democratic-Republican	March 4, 1803 – March 3, 1807	8th 9th	Elected in 1803. Re-elected in 1804. Lost re-election.	1803–1813; Boone, Bracken, Campbell, Franklin, Gallatin, Harrison, Henry, Pendleton, Scott, and Shelby counties
Richard M. Johnson (Great Crossings)	Democratic-Republican	March 4, 1807 – March 3, 1813	10th 11th 12th	Elected in 1806. Re-elected in 1808. Re-elected in 1810. Redistricted to the 3rd district.	1803–1813; Boone, Bracken, Campbell, Franklin, Gallatin, Harrison, Henry, Pendleton, Scott, and Shelby counties
Joseph Desha (Mays Lick)	Democratic-Republican	March 4, 1813 – March 3, 1819	13th 14th 15th	Redistricted from the 6th district and re-elected in 1812. Re-elected in 1814. Re-elected in 1816. Retired.	1813–1823; Bourbon, Bracken, Lewis, Mason, and Nicholas counties
Thomas Metcalfe (Carlisle)	Democratic-Republican	March 4, 1819 – March 3, 1823	16th 17th	Elected in 1818. Re-elected in 1820. Redistricted to the 2nd district.	1813–1823; Bourbon, Bracken, Lewis, Mason, and Nicholas counties
Robert P. Letcher (Lancaster)	Adams-Clay; Democratic-Republican	March 3, 1823 – March 3, 1825	18th 19th 20th 21st 22nd	Elected in 1822. Re-elected in 1824. Re-elected in 1827. Re-elected in 1829. Re-elected in 1831. Redistricted to the 5th district.	1823–1833; Clay, Estill, Garrard, Harlan, Knox, Madison, Perry, Rockcastle, and Whitley counties
Robert P. Letcher (Lancaster)	Anti-Jacksonian	March 3, 1825 – March 3, 1833	18th 19th 20th 21st 22nd	Elected in 1822. Re-elected in 1824. Re-elected in 1827. Re-elected in 1829. Re-elected in 1831. Redistricted to the 5th district.	1823–1833; Clay, Estill, Garrard, Harlan, Knox, Madison, Perry, Rockcastle, and Whitley counties
Martin Beaty (South Fork)	Anti-Jacksonian	March 4, 1833 – March 3, 1835	23rd	Elected in 1833. Lost re-election.	1833–1843 [data missing]
Sherrod Williams (Monticello)	Anti-Jacksonian	March 4, 1835 – March 3, 1837	24th 25th 26th	Elected in 1835. Re-elected in 1837. Re-elected in 1839. Retired.	1833–1843 [data missing]
Sherrod Williams (Monticello)	Whig	March 4, 1837 – March 3, 1841	24th 25th 26th	Elected in 1835. Re-elected in 1837. Re-elected in 1839. Retired.	1833–1843 [data missing]
Bryan Owsley (Jamestown)	Whig	March 4, 1841 – March 3, 1843	27th	Elected in 1841. Lost re-election.	1833–1843 [data missing]
George Caldwell (Columbia)	Democratic	March 4, 1843 – March 3, 1845	28th	Elected in 1843. Retired.	1843–1853 [data missing]
Joshua F. Bell (Danville)	Whig	March 4, 1845 – March 3, 1847	29th	Elected in 1845. Retired.	1843–1853 [data missing]
Aylette Buckner (Greensburg)	Whig	March 4, 1847 – March 3, 1849	30th	Elected in 1847. Lost re-election.	1843–1853 [data missing]
George Caldwell (Columbia)	Democratic	March 4, 1849 – March 3, 1851	31st	Elected in 1849. Retired.	1843–1853 [data missing]
William T. Ward (Greensburg)	Whig	March 4, 1851 – March 3, 1853	32nd	Elected in 1851. Retired.	1843–1853 [data missing]
James Chrisman (Monticello)	Democratic	March 4, 1853 – March 3, 1855	33rd	Elected in 1853. Retired.	1853–1863 [data missing]
Albert G. Talbott (Danville)	Democratic	March 4, 1855 – March 3, 1859	34th 35th	Elected in 1855. Re-elected in 1857. Retired.	1853–1863 [data missing]
William C. Anderson (Danville)	Opposition	March 4, 1859 – March 3, 1861	36th	Elected in 1859. Retired to run for state representative.	1853–1863 [data missing]
Aaron Harding (Greensburg)	Union Democratic	March 4, 1861 – March 3, 1865	37th 38th 39th	Elected in 1861. Re-elected in 1863. Re-elected in 1865. Retired.	1853–1863 [data missing]
Aaron Harding (Greensburg)	Union Democratic	March 4, 1861 – March 3, 1865	37th 38th 39th	Elected in 1861. Re-elected in 1863. Re-elected in 1865. Retired.	1863–1873 [data missing]
Aaron Harding (Greensburg)	Democratic	March 4, 1865 – March 3, 1867	37th 38th 39th	Elected in 1861. Re-elected in 1863. Re-elected in 1865. Retired.	1863–1873 [data missing]
J. Proctor Knott (Lebanon)	Democratic	March 4, 1867 – March 3, 1871	40th 41st	Elected in 1867. Re-elected in 1868. Retired.	1863–1873 [data missing]
William B. Read (Hodgensville)	Democratic	March 4, 1871 – March 3, 1875	42nd 43rd	Elected in 1870. Re-elected in 1872. Lost renomination.	1863–1873 [data missing]
William B. Read (Hodgensville)	Democratic	March 4, 1871 – March 3, 1875	42nd 43rd	Elected in 1870. Re-elected in 1872. Lost renomination.	1873–1883 [data missing]
J. Proctor Knott (Lebanon)	Democratic	March 4, 1875 – March 3, 1883	44th 45th 46th 47th	Elected in 1874. Re-elected in 1876. Re-elected in 1878. Re-elected in 1880. Retired.	1873–1883 [data missing]
Thomas A. Robertson (Elizabethtown)	Democratic	March 4, 1883 – March 3, 1887	48th 49th	Elected in 1882. Re-elected in 1884. Lost renomination.	1883–1893 [data missing]
Alexander B. Montgomery (Elizabethtown)	Democratic	March 4, 1887 – March 3, 1895	50th 51st 52nd 53rd	Elected in 1886. Re-elected in 1888. Re-elected in 1890. Re-elected in 1892. Lost re-election.	1883–1893 [data missing]
Alexander B. Montgomery (Elizabethtown)	Democratic	March 4, 1887 – March 3, 1895	50th 51st 52nd 53rd	Elected in 1886. Re-elected in 1888. Re-elected in 1890. Re-elected in 1892. Lost re-election.	1893–1903 [data missing]
John W. Lewis (Springfield)	Republican	March 4, 1895 – March 3, 1897	54th	Elected in 1894. Lost re-election.	1893–1903 [data missing]
David H. Smith (Hodgensville)	Democratic	March 4, 1897 – March 3, 1907	55th 56th 57th 58th 59th	Elected in 1896. Re-elected in 1898. Re-elected in 1900. Re-elected in 1902. Re-elected in 1904. Retired.	1893–1903 [data missing]
David H. Smith (Hodgensville)	Democratic	March 4, 1897 – March 3, 1907	55th 56th 57th 58th 59th	Elected in 1896. Re-elected in 1898. Re-elected in 1900. Re-elected in 1902. Re-elected in 1904. Retired.	1903–1913 [data missing]
Ben Johnson (Bardstown)	Democratic	March 4, 1907 – March 3, 1927	60th 61st 62nd 63rd 64th 65th 66th 67th 68th 69th	Elected in 1906. Re-elected in 1908. Re-elected in 1910. Re-elected in 1912. Re-elected in 1914. Re-elected in 1916. Re-elected in 1918. Re-elected in 1920. Re-elected in 1922. Re-elected in 1924. Retired.	1903–1913 [data missing]
Ben Johnson (Bardstown)	Democratic	March 4, 1907 – March 3, 1927	60th 61st 62nd 63rd 64th 65th 66th 67th 68th 69th	Elected in 1906. Re-elected in 1908. Re-elected in 1910. Re-elected in 1912. Re-elected in 1914. Re-elected in 1916. Re-elected in 1918. Re-elected in 1920. Re-elected in 1922. Re-elected in 1924. Retired.	1913 – 1933
Henry D. Moorman (Hardinsburg)	Democratic	March 4, 1927 – March 3, 1929	70th	Elected in 1926. Lost re-election.	1913 – 1933
John D. Craddock (Munfordville)	Republican	March 4, 1929 – March 3, 1931	71st	Elected in 1928. Lost re-election.	1913 – 1933
Cap R. Carden (Munfordville)	Democratic	March 4, 1931 – March 3, 1933	72nd	Elected in 1930. Redistricted to the at-large district.	1913 – 1933
District inactive		March 4, 1933 – January 3, 1935	73rd	See Kentucky's at-large congressional district.	
Cap R. Carden (Munfordville)	Democratic	March 4, 1935 – June 13, 1935	74th	Redistricted from the at-large district and re-elected in 1934. Died.	1935–1953
Vacant		June 13, 1935 – November 5, 1935	74th		1935–1953
Edward W. Creal (Hodgenville)	Democratic	November 5, 1935 – October 13, 1943	74th 75th 76th 77th 78th	Elected to finish Carden's term. Re-elected in 1936. Re-elected in 1938. Re-elected in 1940. Re-elected in 1942. Died.	1935–1953
Vacant		October 13, 1943 – November 30, 1943	78th		1935–1953
Chester O. Carrier (Leitchfield)	Republican	November 30, 1943 – January 3, 1945	78th	Elected to finish Creal's term. Lost re-election.	1935–1953
Frank Chelf (Lebanon)	Democratic	January 3, 1945 – January 3, 1967	79th 80th 81st 82nd 83rd 84th 85th 86th 87th 88th 89th	Elected in 1944. Re-elected in 1946. Re-elected in 1948. Re-elected in 1950. Re-elected in 1952. Re-elected in 1954. Re-elected in 1956. Re-elected in 1958. Re-elected in 1960. Re-elected in 1962. Re-elected in 1964. Lost re-election.	1935–1953
Frank Chelf (Lebanon)	Democratic	January 3, 1945 – January 3, 1967	79th 80th 81st 82nd 83rd 84th 85th 86th 87th 88th 89th	Elected in 1944. Re-elected in 1946. Re-elected in 1948. Re-elected in 1950. Re-elected in 1952. Re-elected in 1954. Re-elected in 1956. Re-elected in 1958. Re-elected in 1960. Re-elected in 1962. Re-elected in 1964. Lost re-election.	1953–1957
Frank Chelf (Lebanon)	Democratic	January 3, 1945 – January 3, 1967	79th 80th 81st 82nd 83rd 84th 85th 86th 87th 88th 89th	Elected in 1944. Re-elected in 1946. Re-elected in 1948. Re-elected in 1950. Re-elected in 1952. Re-elected in 1954. Re-elected in 1956. Re-elected in 1958. Re-elected in 1960. Re-elected in 1962. Re-elected in 1964. Lost re-election.	1957–1963
Frank Chelf (Lebanon)	Democratic	January 3, 1945 – January 3, 1967	79th 80th 81st 82nd 83rd 84th 85th 86th 87th 88th 89th	Elected in 1944. Re-elected in 1946. Re-elected in 1948. Re-elected in 1950. Re-elected in 1952. Re-elected in 1954. Re-elected in 1956. Re-elected in 1958. Re-elected in 1960. Re-elected in 1962. Re-elected in 1964. Lost re-election.	1963–1967
Gene Snyder (Brownsboro Farms)	Republican	January 3, 1967 – January 3, 1987	90th 91st 92nd 93rd 94th 95th 96th 97th 98th 99th	Elected in 1966. Re-elected in 1968. Re-elected in 1970. Re-elected in 1972. Re-elected in 1974. Re-elected in 1976. Re-elected in 1978. Re-elected in 1980. Re-elected in 1982. Re-elected in 1984. Retired.	1967–1973
Gene Snyder (Brownsboro Farms)	Republican	January 3, 1967 – January 3, 1987	90th 91st 92nd 93rd 94th 95th 96th 97th 98th 99th	Elected in 1966. Re-elected in 1968. Re-elected in 1970. Re-elected in 1972. Re-elected in 1974. Re-elected in 1976. Re-elected in 1978. Re-elected in 1980. Re-elected in 1982. Re-elected in 1984. Retired.	1973–1983
Gene Snyder (Brownsboro Farms)	Republican	January 3, 1967 – January 3, 1987	90th 91st 92nd 93rd 94th 95th 96th 97th 98th 99th	Elected in 1966. Re-elected in 1968. Re-elected in 1970. Re-elected in 1972. Re-elected in 1974. Re-elected in 1976. Re-elected in 1978. Re-elected in 1980. Re-elected in 1982. Re-elected in 1984. Retired.	1983–1993
Jim Bunning (Southgate)	Republican	January 3, 1987 – January 3, 1999	100th 101st 102nd 103rd 104th 105th	Elected in 1986. Re-elected in 1988. Re-elected in 1990. Re-elected in 1992. Re-elected in 1994. Re-elected in 1996. Retired to run for U.S. Senator.	1983–1993
Jim Bunning (Southgate)	Republican	January 3, 1987 – January 3, 1999	100th 101st 102nd 103rd 104th 105th	Elected in 1986. Re-elected in 1988. Re-elected in 1990. Re-elected in 1992. Re-elected in 1994. Re-elected in 1996. Retired to run for U.S. Senator.	1993–1997
Jim Bunning (Southgate)	Republican	January 3, 1987 – January 3, 1999	100th 101st 102nd 103rd 104th 105th	Elected in 1986. Re-elected in 1988. Re-elected in 1990. Re-elected in 1992. Re-elected in 1994. Re-elected in 1996. Retired to run for U.S. Senator.	1997–2003
Ken Lucas (Florence)	Democratic	January 3, 1999 – January 3, 2005	106th 107th 108th	Elected in 1998. Re-elected in 2000. Re-elected in 2002. Retired.	1997–2003
Ken Lucas (Florence)	Democratic	January 3, 1999 – January 3, 2005	106th 107th 108th	Elected in 1998. Re-elected in 2000. Re-elected in 2002. Retired.	2003–2013
Geoff Davis (Hebron)	Republican	January 3, 2005 – July 31, 2012	109th 110th 111th 112th	Elected in 2004. Re-elected in 2006. Re-elected in 2008. Re-elected in 2010. Resigned due to family health issues.	2003–2013
Vacant		July 31, 2012 – November 6, 2012	112th		2003–2013
Thomas Massie (Garrison)	Republican	November 6, 2012 – present	112th 113th 114th 115th 116th 117th 118th 119th	Elected to finish Davis's term. Elected to full term in 2012. Re-elected in 2014. Re-elected in 2016. Re-elected in 2018. Re-elected in 2020. Re-elected in 2022. Re-elected in 2024. Lost renomination.	2003–2013
Thomas Massie (Garrison)	Republican	November 6, 2012 – present	112th 113th 114th 115th 116th 117th 118th 119th	Elected to finish Davis's term. Elected to full term in 2012. Re-elected in 2014. Re-elected in 2016. Re-elected in 2018. Re-elected in 2020. Re-elected in 2022. Re-elected in 2024. Lost renomination.	2013–2023
Thomas Massie (Garrison)	Republican	November 6, 2012 – present	112th 113th 114th 115th 116th 117th 118th 119th	Elected to finish Davis's term. Elected to full term in 2012. Re-elected in 2014. Re-elected in 2016. Re-elected in 2018. Re-elected in 2020. Re-elected in 2022. Re-elected in 2024. Lost renomination.	2023–present
Ed Gallrein (Shelbyville)	Republican	Assuming office on January 3, 2027		Elected in 2026.	2023–present

== Recent election results ==
=== 2002 ===
Kentucky's 4th Congressional District Election (2002)
Party	Candidate	Votes	%
Democratic	Ken Lucas*	87,776	51.11
Republican	Geoff Davis	81,651	47.55
Libertarian	John Grote	2,308	1.34
Total votes		171,735	100.00
Turnout			
Democratic hold			

=== 2004 ===
Kentucky's 4th Congressional District Election (2004)
Party	Candidate	Votes	%
Republican	Geoff Davis	160,982	54.40
Democratic	Nick Clooney	129,876	43.89
Independent	Michael Slider	5,069	1.71
Total votes		295,927	100.00
Turnout			
Republican gain from Democratic			

=== 2006 ===
Kentucky's 4th Congressional District Election (2006)
Party	Candidate	Votes	%
Republican	Geoff Davis*	105,845	51.69
Democratic	Ken Lucas	88,822	43.38
Libertarian	Brian Houillion	10,100	4.93
Total votes		204,765	100.00
Turnout			
Republican hold			

=== 2008 ===
Kentucky's 4th Congressional District Election (2008)
Party	Candidate	Votes	%
Republican	Geoff Davis*	190,210	63.03
Democratic	Michael Kelley	111,549	36.97
Total votes		301,759	100.00
Turnout			
Republican hold			

=== 2010 ===
Kentucky's 4th Congressional District Election (2010)
Party	Candidate	Votes	%
Republican	Geoff Davis*	151,774	69.48
Democratic	John Waltz	66,675	30.52
Total votes		218,449	100.00
Turnout			
Republican hold			

=== 2012 ===
Kentucky's 4th Congressional District Election (2012)
Party	Candidate	Votes	%
Republican	Thomas Massie	186,026	62.13
Democratic	William Adkins	104,731	34.98
Independent	David Lewis	8,673	2.90
Total votes		299,430	100.00
Turnout			
Republican hold			

=== 2014 ===
Kentucky's 4th Congressional District, 2014
Party	Candidate	Votes	%
Republican	Thomas Massie (Incumbent)	150,464	67.7
Democratic	Peter Newberry	71,694	32.3
Total votes		222,158	100
Republican hold			

=== 2016 ===
Kentucky's 4th Congressional District, 2016
Party	Candidate	Votes	%
Republican	Thomas Massie (Incumbent)	233,922	71.32
Democratic	Calvin Sidle	94,065	28.68
Total votes		327,987	100
Republican hold			

=== 2018 ===
Kentucky's 4th Congressional District, 2018
Party	Candidate	Votes	%
Republican	Thomas Massie (Incumbent)	162,946	62.2
Democratic	Seth Hall	90,536	34.6
Independent	Mike Moffett	8,318	2.2
Independent	David Goodwin (write-in)	12	0.0
Total votes		261,812	100
Republican hold			

=== 2020 ===
Kentucky's 4th Congressional District, 2020
Party	Candidate	Votes	%
Republican	Thomas Massie (Incumbent)	256,613	67.1
Democratic	Alexandra Owensby	125,896	32.9
Total votes		382,509	100
Republican hold			

=== 2022 ===
Kentucky's 4th Congressional District, 2022
Party	Candidate	Votes	%
Republican	Thomas Massie (incumbent)	167,541	65.0
Democratic	Matthew Lehman	79,977	31.0
Pirate	Ethan Osborne (Note: Appeared on the ballot as an independent.)	10,111	3.9
Total votes		257,629	100.0
Republican hold			

=== 2024 ===
Kentucky's 4th Congressional District, 2024
Party	Candidate	Votes	%
Republican	Thomas Massie (incumbent)	278,386	99.6
Write-in		1,131	0.4
Total votes		279,517	100.0
Republican hold			

=== 2026 ===
Kentucky's 4th Congressional District, 2026
Party	Candidate	Votes	%
Republican	Ed Gallrein	137,623	54.22
Democratic	Melissa Strange	103,713	40.86
Libertarian	Jeremy Todd	12,484	4.92
Write-in		15	0.01
Total votes		253,835	100.0
Republican hold			

== See also ==
- Kentucky's congressional districts
- List of United States congressional districts
