= Senator Pugh =

Senator Pugh may refer to:

== Members of the United States Senate ==
- George E. Pugh (1822–1876), U.S. Senator from Ohio from 1855 to 1861
- James L. Pugh (1820–1907), U.S. Senator from Alabama from 1880 to 1897

== United States state senate members ==
- Adam Pugh (born 1977), Oklahoma State Senate
- Catherine Pugh (born 1950), Maryland State Senate
- Samuel Johnson Pugh (1850–1922), Kentucky State Senate
