= John D. Craddock =

American politician

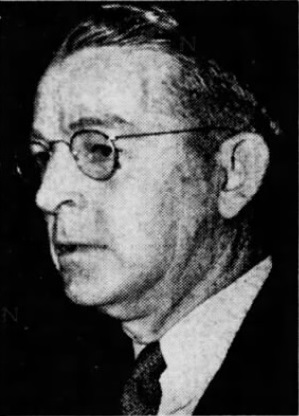
- From the May 21, 1942 edition of The Courier-Journal (Louisville, Kentucky)

Member of the United States House of Representatives
- In office March 4, 1929 – March 3, 1931
- Preceded by: Henry D. Moorman
- Succeeded by: Cap R. Carden
- Constituency: Kentucky's 4th congressional district

Personal details
- Born: October 26, 1881 Munfordville, Kentucky, U.S.
- Died: May 21, 1942 (aged 60) Louisville, Kentucky, U.S.
- Resting place: New Munfordville Cemetery, Munfordville, Kentucky, U.S.
- Party: Republican
- Spouse: Mary E. Craddock (m. 1910)
- Children: 1
- Education: Green River Collegiate Institute, Munfordville, Kentucky, U.S.
- Occupation: Farmer

Military service
- Service: United States Army
- Years of service: 1898–1902
- Rank: Sergeant
- Unit: Troop F, 3rd Cavalry Regiment
- Wars: Philippine–American War; China Relief Expedition

John Durrett Craddock (October 26, 1881 – May 20, 1942) was a U.S. representative from Kentucky.

== Biography ==
Craddock was born in Munfordville, Kentucky on October 26, 1881, a son of Berry Carter Craddock and Alice Green (McCarty) Craddock. He attended the public schools of Hart County and the Green River Collegiate Institute. The 1896 death of his father caused Berry to begin working to help support his seven brothers and sisters, and he was employed as a printer for the Hart County News.

In 1898, Craddock joined the United States Army for the Spanish–American War and was assigned to Troop F, 3rd Cavalry Regiment. He served in the Philippines during the Philippine–American War and in China during the China Relief Expedition, the U.S. response to the Boxer Rebellion. Craddock was promoted to corporal and sergeant, and was discharged at Fort Yates, North Dakota in 1902.

After returning to Kentucky, Craddock was employed in the transportation department of the Louisville and Nashville Railroad. In 1905, he accepted a position as a railroad engineer with the Isthmian Canal Commission, and he remained in the Panama Canal Zone until 1910. He returned to Munfordville in 1910 and became the owner and operator of a successful farm that grew tobacco in addition to raising cattle and hogs.

Craddock was active in politics as a Republican, and served as chairman of the party in Hart County. In addition to serving for several years as a justice of the peace, Craddock was a member of the Munfordville Board of Trustees from 1910 to 1925. During World War I, he recruited volunteers for the American Red Cross and YMCA, and organized several Liberty Loan drives. In 1922, he assisted in organizing the Burley Tobacco Growers Association, of which he served as a director until 1941. He served as member of the Kentucky Mammoth Cave National Park Commission from 1922 to 1928.

Craddock was elected as a Republican to the Seventy-first Congress (March 4, 1929 – March 3, 1931). He was an unsuccessful candidate for reelection in 1930 to the Seventy-second Congress. After leaving Congress, Craddock was a field representative for the Federal Farm Board in 1931 and 1932. He was an agent for the Kentucky Blue Grass Cooperative Association in 1933 and 1934.

From 1934 to 1935, Craddock served as treasurer of Hart County, Kentucky. He later resumed farming, and was a member of the State Agricultural Adjustment Administration Committee from 1939 until his death. Craddock died in Louisville, Kentucky on May 20, 1942. He was buried at New Munfordville Cemetery in Munfordville.

== Family ==
In 1910, Craddock married Mary E. Craddock; despite having the same last name before their marriage, they were not related. They were the parents of a son, John D. Craddock Jr.

U.S. House of Representatives
Preceded by Henry D. Moorman	Member of the U.S. House of Representatives from Kentucky's 4th congressional district March 4, 1929 – March 3, 1931	Succeeded by Cap R. Carden
