= Melissa Strange =

Melissa Claire Strange is an American politician and businesswoman from Villa Hills, Kentucky who ran to represent Kentucky's Fourth Congressional District in the House of Representatives in 2026. She received her bachelor's degree in international studies from Northern Kentucky University and her MBA from Thomas More University.
