= Sherrod Williams =

American politician

Member of the U.S. House of Representatives from Kentucky's 4th district
- In office March 4, 1835 – March 3, 1841
- Preceded by: Martin Beaty
- Succeeded by: Bryan Owsley

Personal details
- Born: 1804 Pulaski County, Kentucky, U.S.
- Died: March 24, 1876 (aged 71–72) San Jose, California, U.S.

Sherrod Williams (1804 – March 24, 1876) was an American politician and lawyer. He served as a member of the United States House of Representatives from Kentucky.

== Biography ==
Sherrod Williams was born in 1804 in Pulaski County, Kentucky, and he moved with his parents to Wayne County in childhood. He received a limited education, but had learned the trade of brickmaker in Monticello when about fifteen years of age. He studied law and was admitted to the bar and practiced law.

His sons included Thomas Hansford Williams, the former Attorney General of California from 1858 to 1862; and George E. Williams (1835–1899), a former member of the California State Assembly's 15th District, from 1873 to 1875.

He served as member of the Kentucky State House of Representatives from 1829 to 1834, and in 1846. Williams was elected as an Anti-Jacksonian Whig to the Twenty-fourth, Twenty-fifth, and Twenty-sixth Congresses (March 4, 1835 – March 3, 1841). He served as chairman of the Committee on Invalid Pensions (Twenty-sixth Congress). He was not a candidate for reelection.

He moved to California, where he died in San Jose, California on March 24, 1876. He was buried in Laurel Hill Cemetery in San Francisco, he was moved to Cypress Lawn Memorial Park.

U.S. House of Representatives
Preceded by Martin Beaty	Member of the U.S. House of Representatives from Kentucky's 4th congressional district March 4, 1835 – March 3, 1841	Succeeded by Bryan Owsley
