= 1935 United States House of Representatives elections =

There were seven special elections to the United States House of Representatives in 1935, during the 74th United States Congress, sorted here by election date.

== List of elections ==
District	Incumbent			This race	
District	Member	Party	First elected	Results	Candidates
Indiana 2	Vacant			Representative-elect Frederick Landis (R) died before the Congress began. New member elected January 29, 1935. Republican hold.	▌ ✓ Charles A. Halleck (Republican) 52.74%; ▌George R. Durgan (Democratic) 47.26%
Alabama 1	John McDuffie	Democratic	1918	Incumbent resigned March 2, 1935, to become U.S. District Judge. New member elected July 30, 1935. Democratic hold.	▌ ✓ Frank W. Boykin (Democratic); Unopposed
Rhode Island 1	Francis Condon	Democratic	1930 (special)	Incumbent resigned January 10, 1935, to become Associate Justice of the Rhode Island Supreme Court. New member elected August 6, 1935. Republican gain.	▌ ✓ Charles Risk (Republican) 57.81%; ▌Antonio Prince (Democratic) 42.19%
Kentucky 4	Cap R. Carden	Democratic	1930	Incumbent died June 13, 1935. New member elected November 5, 1935. Democratic hold.	▌ ✓ Edward W. Creal (Democratic); Unopposed
New York 2	William F. Brunner	Democratic	1928	Incumbent resigned September 27, 1935, after being elected Sheriff of Queens County, New York. New member elected November 5, 1935. Democratic hold.	▌ ✓ William B. Barry (Democratic) 73.11%; ▌Joseph M. Conroy (Republican) 24.56%; ▌Sam DeWitt (Socialist) 2.33%
New York 22	Anthony J. Griffin	Democratic	1918 (special)	Incumbent died January 13, 1935. New member elected November 5, 1935. Democratic hold.	▌ ✓ Edward W. Curley (Democratic) 69.33%; ▌Victor Santini (Republican) 22.26%; ▌Tyrell Wilson (Socialist) 2.61%; ▌Manning Johnson (Communist) 2.41%
Michigan 3	Henry M. Kimball	Republican	1934	Incumbent died October 19, 1935. New member elected December 17, 1935. Republican hold.	▌ ✓ Verner Main (Republican); ▌Howard W. Cavanagh (Democratic); ▌E. G. Keifer (Farmer–Labor)
