= Henry D. Moorman =

American politician (1880–1939)

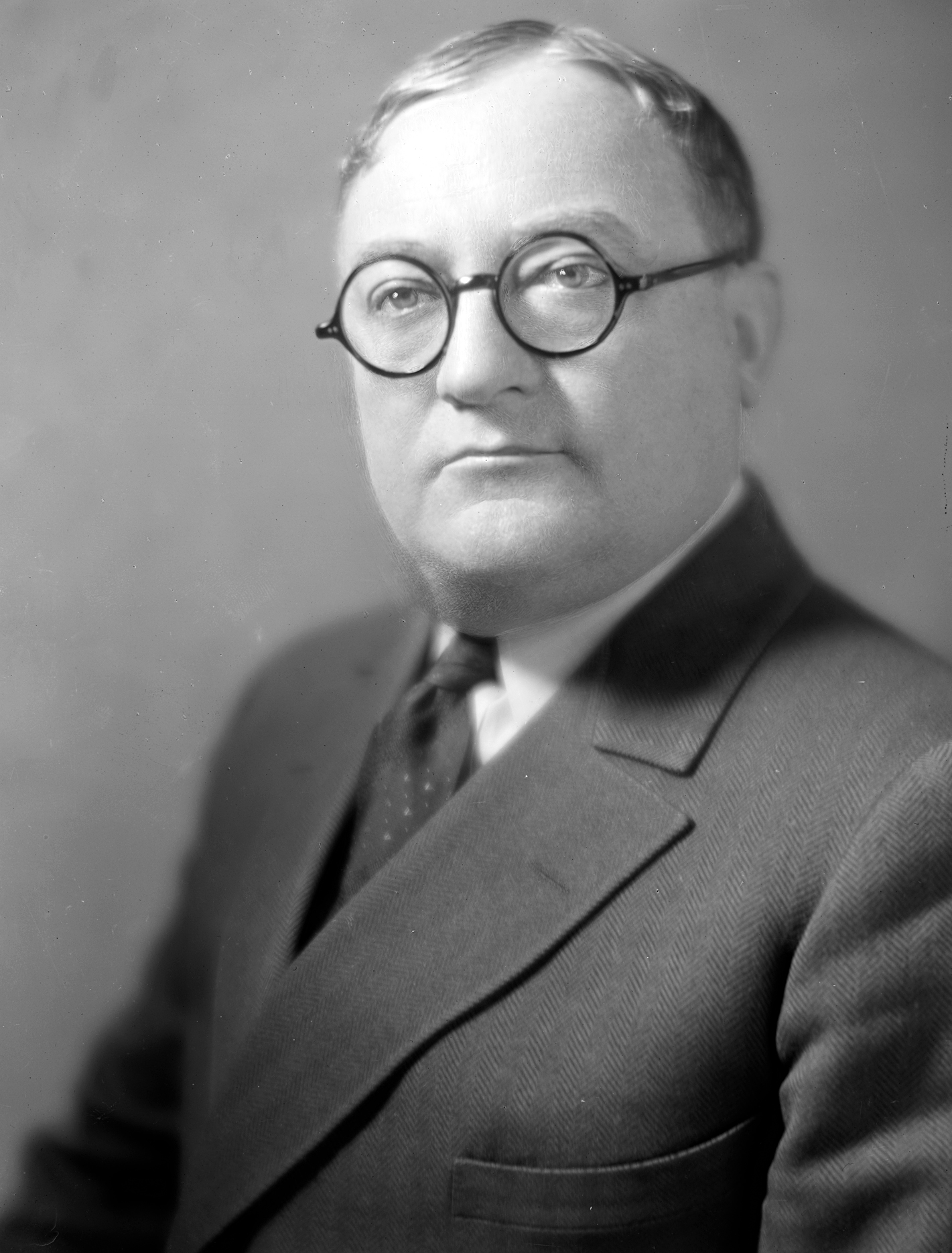
- Portrait by Harris & Ewing

Member of the U.S. House of Representatives from Kentucky's 4th district
- In office March 4, 1927 – March 3, 1929
- Preceded by: Ben Johnson
- Succeeded by: John D. Craddock

Personal details
- Born: Henry DeHaven Moorman; June 9, 1880 Glen Dean, Kentucky, U.S.
- Died: February 3, 1939 (aged 58) Hot Springs, Arkansas, U.S.
- Party: Democratic

Henry DeHaven Moorman (June 9, 1880 – February 3, 1939) was an American businessman and politician who served as a member of the U.S. House of Representatives from Kentucky's 4th congressional district from 1927 to 1929.

Born on a farm near Glen Dean, Kentucky, Moorman attended public school. He studied law, was admitted to the bar in 1900, and commenced practice in Hardinsburg. He also engaged in agricultural pursuits and in banking. He was county judge of Breckinridge County from 1905 to 1909 and commonwealth attorney of the ninth judicial district from 1914 to 1927.

He served as a private in Company C, 1st Regiment, Kentucky Volunteer Infantry, with service in Puerto Rico during the Spanish–American War. During the First World War, he enlisted in the United States Army on January 14, 1918, and was assigned to Headquarters Company, 10th Field Artillery Regiment. He was promoted to corporal and assigned to duty with the judge advocate general at Service of Supply headquarters, and was discharged April 1, 1919.

Moorman was elected as a Democrat to the 70th United States Congress. He served for a single term from March 4, 1927, to March 3, 1929, and lost reelection in 1928 to John D. Craddock. He resumed his former professional and business pursuits in Hardinsburg, and died while on a visit in Hot Springs, Arkansas, on February 3, 1939. He was interred in Ivy Hill Cemetery in Hardinsburg.

== Electoral history ==
Electoral history of Henry D. Moorman
Year	Office		Party	Votes			Result	Swing	Ref.
Year	Office		Party	Total	%	P.	Result	Swing	Ref.
1926	U.S. House	4th	Democratic	24,348	55.33	1st	Won	Hold	
1928	U.S. House	4th	Democratic	34,639	46.88	2nd	Lost	Gain	
Source: Clerk of the U.S. House | Election Statistics

U.S. House of Representatives
Preceded by Ben Johnson	Member of the U.S. House of Representatives from Kentucky's 4th congressional district March 4, 1927 – March 3, 1929	Succeeded by John D. Craddock
