= Bryan Owsley =

American politician

Register of the Kentucky Land Office
- In office September 1846 – October 27, 1849
- Governor: William Owsley
- Preceded by: James Robertson
- Succeeded by: Elisha A. Macurdy

Member of the U.S. House of Representatives from Kentucky's 4th district
- In office March 4, 1841 – March 3, 1843
- Preceded by: Sherrod Williams
- Succeeded by: George Caldwell

Personal details
- Born: August 19, 1798 Crab Orchard, Kentucky
- Died: October 27, 1849 (aged 51) Frankfort, Kentucky
- Party: Whig
- Relations: William Owsley (cousin)

Bryan Young Owsley (August 19, 1798 – October 27, 1849) was a United States representative from Kentucky.

== Biography ==
He was born near Crab Orchard, Kentucky and he attended the common schools of Lincoln County, Kentucky. He studied law and was admitted to the bar and then moved to Jamestown, Kentucky, where he was the clerk of the circuit court in 1827.

Owsley was elected as a Whig to the Twenty-seventh Congress (March 4, 1841 – March 3, 1843) but was an unsuccessful candidate for reelection in 1842 to the Twenty-eighth Congress. After leaving Congress, he was a registrar of the United States land office, with residence in Frankfort, Kentucky 1845–1849. He died in Frankfort in 1849.

Owsley was a first cousin to Governor William Owsley; their fathers, Anthony and William respectively, were brothers.

U.S. House of Representatives
Preceded by Sherrod Williams	Member of the U.S. House of Representatives from Kentucky's 4th congressional district March 4, 1841 – March 3, 1843	Succeeded by George Caldwell
