= Martin Beaty =

American politician (1784–1856)

Martin Beaty (October 8, 1784 – June 17, 1856) was a United States representative from Kentucky. He was born in Abingdon, Virginia. In his life, he worked as an iron furnace operator, a salt manufacturer, a rancher, and a farmer. Beaty was a slaveowner.

Beaty was a member of the Kentucky Senate from 1824–1828 and in 1832. He served as a presidential elector for Henry Clay and John Sergeant in 1832 and William Henry Harrison and Francis Granger in 1836. He was an unsuccessful candidate for election to the Twenty-first Congress in 1828, and to the Twenty-second Congress in 1830, but was elected as an Anti-Jacksonian to the Twenty-third Congress (March 4, 1833 – March 3, 1835). He was an unsuccessful candidate for reelection to the Twenty-fourth Congress in 1834. After leaving Congress, he was a member of the Kentucky House of Representatives, 1848. He died in 1856 in Belmont, Texas, where he was buried in Belmont Cemetery.

He was a great-grandfather of Fiddlin' John Carson (1868–1949), an early pioneer of country music.

U.S. House of Representatives
Preceded by Robert P. Letcher	Member of the U.S. House of Representatives from Kentucky's 4th congressional district March 4, 1833 – March 3, 1835	Succeeded by Sherrod Williams
