= Frank Chelf =

American politician

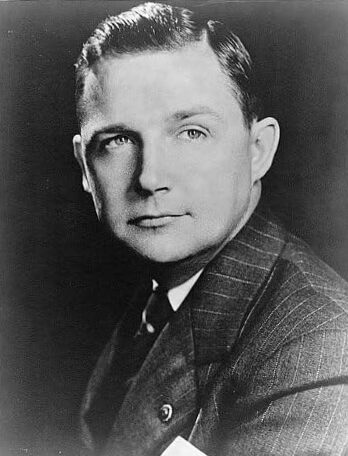

Member of the U.S. House of Representatives from Kentucky's 4th district
- In office January 3, 1945 – January 3, 1967
- Preceded by: Chester O. Carrier
- Succeeded by: Gene Snyder

Personal details
- Born: Frank Leslie Chelf; September 22, 1907 Elizabethtown, Kentucky, U.S.
- Died: September 1, 1982 (aged 74) Lebanon, Kentucky, U.S.
- Party: Democratic

Frank Leslie Chelf (September 22, 1907 – September 1, 1982) was a United States representative from Kentucky. He was born on a farm near Elizabethtown, Kentucky. He graduated from Masonic Home High School and lived at the Masonic Widows and Orphans Home (now Masonic Homes of Kentucky) in Louisville, KY. He attended the public schools as well as Centre College at Danville, Kentucky and St. Mary's College. He graduated from Cumberland School of Law at Cumberland University, Lebanon, Tennessee in 1931 and was admitted to the bar in 1931 and commenced practice in Lebanon, Kentucky. He served as an attorney of Marion County, Kentucky 1933–1944.

Chelf took leave of absence from his official duties on August 1, 1942, to volunteer in the United States Army and was commissioned a first lieutenant in the Air Corps and saw active service in World War II. He served as chief code designator, Intelligence Division, Air Transport Command, and later as executive officer, Plans and Liaison Division, and as assistant chief of Air Staff Training. He was discharged on August 10, 1944, due to physical disability, with rank of major in the Air Corps.

Chelf served as a delegate to the Democratic National Convention in 1936. He was elected as a Democrat to the Seventy-ninth and to the ten succeeding Congresses (January 3, 1945 – January 3, 1967) and was unsuccessful candidate for reelection in 1966 to the Ninetieth Congress. Chelf did not sign the 1956 Southern Manifesto, and voted in favor of the Civil Rights Acts of 1960 and 1968, as well as the 24th Amendment to the U.S. Constitution and the Voting Rights Act of 1965, but voted against the Civil Rights Acts of 1957 and 1964. During his time in Congress, Chelf amassed a mainly liberal voting record. After leaving Congress, he resumed the practice of law. He was a legislative consultant and resident of Lebanon, Kentucky until his death there in 1982. He was buried in Ryder Cemetery.

U.S. House of Representatives
| Preceded by Chester Carrier | Member of the U.S. House of Representatives from Kentucky's 4th congressional district January 3, 1945 – January 3, 1967 | Succeeded by Gene Snyder |
