= James N. Kehoe =

American politician

James Nicholas Kehoe
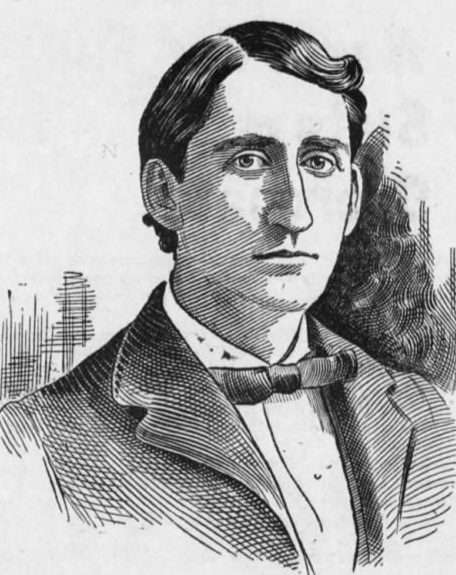

Member of the U.S. House of Representatives from Kentucky's 9th district
- In office March 4, 1901 – March 3, 1905
- Preceded by: Samuel J. Pugh
- Succeeded by: Joseph B. Bennett

Personal details
- Born: July 15, 1862 Maysville, Kentucky, U.S.
- Died: June 15, 1945 (aged 82) Cincinnati, Ohio, U.S.
- Resting place: Maysville Cemetery
- Party: Democratic

James Nicholas Kehoe (July 15, 1862, in Maysville, Kentucky – June 16, 1945, in Cincinnati, Ohio) was a U.S. representative from Kentucky.

Kehoe was born in Maysville, Kentucky and attended public and private schools. He engaged in the printing business until 1884, and studied law in Louisville, Kentucky before being admitted to the bar on November 1, 1888, and engaged in practice in Maysville. He served as precinct, county, and district chairman of the Democratic executive committee, and the city attorney of Maysville. He also served as master in chancery of the Mason County Circuit Court.

Kehoe was elected as a Democrat to the Fifty-seventh and Fifty-eighth Congresses (March 4, 1901 – March 3, 1905). He was an unsuccessful candidate for reelection in 1904 to the Fifty-ninth Congress. He then served as a delegate to the Democratic National Convention in 1912, and as vice president of the Ohio Valley Improvement Association and of the Burley Tobacco Growers' Cooperation Association. He also engaged in banking and served as president of the Kentucky Bankers' Association.

Kehoe died in Cincinnati, Ohio, June 16, 1945 and was interred in Maysville Cemetery, Maysville, Kentucky.

U.S. House of Representatives
Preceded by Samuel J. Pugh	Member of the U.S. House of Representatives from Kentucky's 9th congressional district 1901 – 1905	Succeeded by Joseph B. Bennett
