= Ben Johnson (Kentucky politician) =

American lawyer and politician (1858–1950)

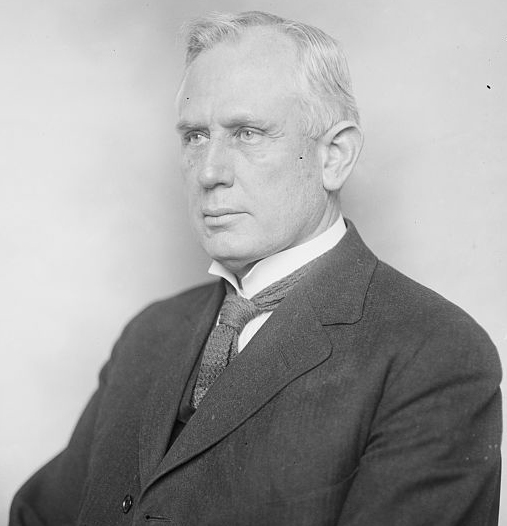

Member of the U.S. House of Representatives from Kentucky's 4th district
- In office March 4, 1907 – March 3, 1927
- Preceded by: David Highbaugh Smith
- Succeeded by: Henry D. Moorman

Member of the Kentucky Senate from the 14th district
- In office January 1, 1906 – November 5, 1906
- Preceded by: W. W. Booles
- Succeeded by: Samuel H. Peters

50th Speaker of the Kentucky House of Representatives
- In office December 30, 1887 – August 5, 1889
- Preceded by: Charles Offutt
- Succeeded by: Harvey Myers

Member of the Kentucky House of Representatives from Nelson County
- In office August 3, 1885 – August 5, 1889
- Preceded by: J. S. Humphreys
- Succeeded by: Isaac Middleton

Personal details
- Born: May 20, 1858 Nelson County, Kentucky, U.S.
- Died: June 4, 1950 (aged 92) Bardstown, Kentucky, U.S.
- Resting place: St. Joseph's Cemetery
- Party: Democratic
- Education: St. Mary's College; University of Louisville School of Law
- Occupation: Politician; lawyer

Ben Johnson (May 20, 1858 – June 4, 1950) was an American lawyer and politician who served in the United States House of Representatives from 1907 to 1927, representing Kentucky's 4th congressional district as a member of the Democratic Party.

== Early life and education ==
Born near Bardstown in Nelson County, Kentucky. His father was William Johnson, who was state senator and a Lieutenant Governor of Kentucky. His mother, Nancy, was a member of the committee that selected the design of the Confederate flag; they chose a design submitted by Nicola Marschall. After prep school he went to St. Mary's College, in Marion County, Kentucky, and graduated in June 1878. He then transferred to the Louisville Law University and graduated in 1882. That same year he was admitted to the bar and he began practicing law in Bardstown.

== Career ==
He was elected to the Kentucky State House of Representatives in 1885 and again in 1887. Johnson served as Kentucky speaker of the house in 1887. On July 10, 1893, he was appointed as a collector of internal revenue for the fifth district of Kentucky by President Grover Cleveland, he served this post until August 10, 1897.

Johnson was elected in 1905 as a member of the Kentucky State senate and served until he resigned, November 5, 1906, upon his election the U.S. House of Representatives. He served as a Representative from Kentucky, as a Democrat, to 10 straight congresses, Sixtieth through Sixty-ninth. Johnson served as chairman for the Committee on District of Columbia (62d - 65th Congresses), and served as a delegate at large to the Democratic National Conventions in 1912 and 1920. On January 20, 1914, Johnson was involved in a fistfight with lawyer John R. Shields in the House District Committee Room of the Capitol. Johnson was the sole Southern Democrat to vote in favor of the Dyer Anti-Lynching Bill.

In 1926 he decided to return to Bardstown and practice law again, he refused to be a candidate for the nomination that year. The following March he returned home after 20-years in Washington, D.C.

== Death and legacy ==
Johnson died at the age of 92, on June 4, 1950, in Bardstown and is interred in St. Joseph's Cemetery.

His House, the Ben Johnson House, is on the National Register of Historic Places.

U.S. House of Representatives
Preceded by David H. Smith	Member of the U.S. House of Representatives from Kentucky's 4th congressional district March 4, 1907 – March 3, 1927	Succeeded by Henry D. Moorman
