= George Caldwell (Kentucky politician) =

American politician (1814–1866)

George Alfred Caldwell

Member of the U.S. House of Representatives from Kentucky's 4th district
- In office March 4, 1843 – March 3, 1845
- In office March 4, 1849 – March 3, 1851

Member of the Kentucky House of Representatives
- In office 1839–1840

Personal details
- Born: October 18, 1814 Columbia, Kentucky, U.S.
- Died: September 17, 1866 (aged 51) Louisville, Kentucky, U.S.
- Resting place: Cave Hill Cemetery; Louisville, Kentucky, U.S.
- Relations: Isaac Caldwell (brother)
- Military career
- Allegiance: United States
- Service years: June 26, 1846 – August 25, 1848
- Rank: Lieutenant colonel
- Unit: Voltigeurs Regiment
- Conflicts: Mexican–American War; Battle of Chapultepec

George Alfred Caldwell (October 18, 1814 – September 17, 1866) was a United States representative from Kentucky's 4th Congressional district from 1843 to 1845 and 1849 to 1851. He also served in the Kentucky House of Representatives from 1839 to 1840.

== Early life ==
George Caldwell was born in Columbia, Kentucky, where he attended the common schools. He studied law and was admitted to the bar in 1837 and commenced practice in Adair County, Kentucky.

== Career ==
Caldwell was a member of the Kentucky House of Representatives in 1839 and 1840. He was elected as a Democrat to the Twenty-eighth Congress (March 4, 1843 – March 3, 1845). During his term, he served as chairman, Committee on Expenditures in the Department of the Treasury (Twenty-eighth Congress).

At the outbreak of the Mexican–American War, Caldwell was commissioned major and quartermaster of volunteers on June 26, 1846. He was promoted on several occasions including to Major of Infantry March 3, 1847, and Major of Voltigeurs on April 9, 1847. He was made a brevetted lieutenant colonel September 13, 1847, for service in the Battle of Chapultepec, Mexico and honorably mustered out August 25, 1848.

Caldwell was elected to the Thirty-first Congress (March 4, 1849 – March 3, 1851) where he again served the chairman, Committee on Expenditures in the Department of the Treasury (Thirty-first Congress). He was not a candidate for reelection to the Thirty-second Congress.

After leaving Congress, he resumed the practice of law in Louisville, Kentucky with his brother Isaac Caldwell. He was a delegate to the Union National Convention at Philadelphia in 1866.

== Personal life ==
Caldwell died in Louisville, Kentucky, on September 17, 1866. He was buried in Cave Hill Cemetery in Louisville.

U.S. House of Representatives
Preceded by Bryan Owsley	Member of the U.S. House of Representatives from Kentucky's 4th congressional district March 4, 1843 – March 3, 1845	Succeeded by Joshua F. Bell
Preceded by Aylette Buckner	Member of the U.S. House of Representatives from Kentucky's 4th congressional district March 4, 1849 – March 3, 1851	Succeeded by William T. Ward
