= Isaac Caldwell (died 1885) =

American lawyer and educator (1824–1885)

- Born: June 30, 1824; Columbia, Kentucky, U.S.
- Died: November 25, 1885 (aged 61)
- Resting place: St. Louis Cemetery; Louisville, Kentucky, U.S.
- Education: Georgetown College
- Occupations: Lawyer; educator
- Office: President of the University of Louisville
- Term: 1869–1885
- Spouse: Catherine Smith (m. 1857)
- Relatives: George Alfred Caldwell (brother)

Isaac Caldwell (June 30, 1824 – November 25, 1885) was an American lawyer and educator. He argued the U.S. Supreme Court case Blyew v. United States and served as the president of the University of Louisville from 1869 to 1885.

== Early life ==
Isaac Caldwell was born on June 30, 1824, near Columbia, Kentucky to Anne (née Trabue) and William Caldwell. He attended local schools and then worked for three years in his father's clerk's office. He attended Georgetown College and studied law for two years. He was admitted to the bar in March 1847.

== Career ==
Caldwell practiced law in Columbia, first with judge Zachariah Wheat. Caldwell and Wheat formed a partnership in January 1848 and worked together for several years. From around 1851 until the death of his brother in 1866, Caldwell formed a practice with his older brother, U.S. Congressman George Alfred Caldwell. They moved their offices to Louisville, Kentucky in March 1852. After the death of his brother, Caldwell started practicing criminal law, the side of the business that his brother had been affiliated with. In 1870, Caldwell fought for the business interests of Louisville & Nashville Railroad when the Kentucky legislature considered giving the Cincinnati Southern Railroad the central Kentucky right of way. In 1872, Caldwell opposed the federal authority in Kentucky civil rights and argued the case Blyew v. United States before the U.S. Supreme Court.

Caldwell's name was put forward as a candidate for the U.S. Senate in 1875, but he withdrew from the election.

Caldwell served as president of the University of Louisville from 1869 to 1885. While he was president, the university joined the Association of American Medical Colleges and he helped raise the standards of admission and graduation.

== Personal life ==
Caldwell married Catherine Smith of Louisville on January 20, 1857. He died on November 25, 1885, and was buried at St. Louis Cemetery in Louisville.
