= William Thomas Ward =

American politician (1808–1878)

William T. Ward
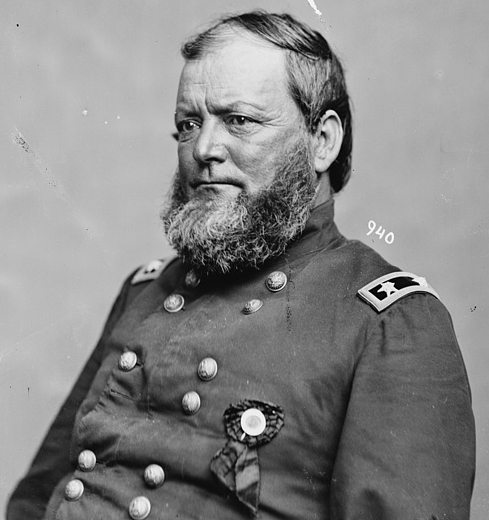

Member of the U.S. House of Representatives from Kentucky's 4th district
- In office March 4, 1851 – March 3, 1853
- Preceded by: George Caldwell
- Succeeded by: James Chrisman

Member of the Kentucky House of Representatives
- In office 1850

Personal details
- Born: August 9, 1808 Amelia County, Virginia, U.S.
- Died: October 12, 1878 (aged 70) Louisville, Kentucky, U.S.
- Resting place: Cave Hill Cemetery, Louisville, Kentucky, U.S.
- Party: Whig
- Education: St. Mary's College
- Profession: Lawyer

Military service
- Allegiance: United States of America; Union
- Branch/service: United States Army; Union Army
- Years of service: 1847–1848, 1861–1865
- Rank: Brigadier General
- Unit: XX Corps
- Battles/wars: Mexican–American War; American Civil War

William Thomas Ward (August 9, 1808 – October 12, 1878) was a brigadier general in the United States Army during the American Civil War, a United States Congressman from the U.S. state Kentucky, and member of the Kentucky Legislature.

== Biography ==
William T. Ward was born in Amelia County, Virginia, one of the many children of William Ward Jr. and Sally W. Elmore. His parents migrated with their extended family to Kentucky to settle on lands granted his maternal grandfather Thomas Elmore, due to his service in the American Revolutionary War. His maternal great uncle was John Archer Elmore. Ward attended common schools and then St. Mary's College near Lebanon, Kentucky. Ward studied law and was admitted to the bar, beginning practice in Greensburg, Kentucky.

Ward served in the Mexican–American War as a major of the 4th Kentucky Volunteers from 1847 to 1848. In 1850, Ward served as a member of the Kentucky House of Representatives. He was elected to represent the Kentucky 4th Congressional District to U.S. Congress as a member of the Whig Party, serving in the House of Representatives 32nd Congress (March 4, 1851 – March 3, 1853). He did not stand for renomination in 1852.

With the outbreak of the Civil War, Ward was commissioned as a brigadier general in the Union Army, serving throughout the war. Ward led a brigade in XX Corps during the early stages of the Atlanta campaign. After MG Daniel Butterfield went on leave, Ward commanded third division XX Corps for the remainder of the campaign including conspicuous service at the battle of Peachtree Creek. He also led it in Sherman's March to the Sea and the Carolinas campaign.

After the war was over, he returned to the private practice of law in Louisville, Kentucky, partnering with his son Ossian T. Ward.

Ward died in 1878 and was buried in the Cave Hill Cemetery in Louisville, Kentucky.

== See also ==
- List of American Civil War generals (Union)

U.S. House of Representatives
Preceded by George Caldwell	Member of the U.S. House of Representatives from Kentucky's 4th congressional district March 4, 1851 – March 3, 1853	Succeeded by James Chrisman
