= Joseph B. Bennett =

American politician

Joseph Bentley Bennett
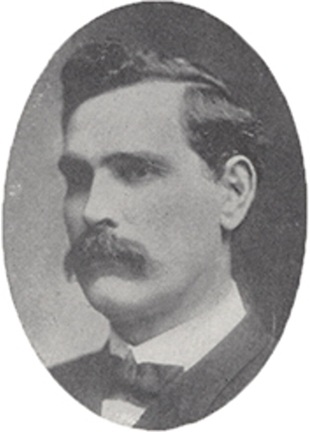
- From 1908's Members of the House of Representatives, Sixtieth Congress

Member of the U.S. House of Representatives from Kentucky's 9th district
- In office March 4, 1905 – March 3, 1911
- Preceded by: James Nicholas Kehoe
- Succeeded by: William J. Fields

Personal details
- Born: April 21, 1859 Greenup County, Kentucky, U.S.
- Died: November 7, 1923 (aged 64) Greenup, Kentucky, U.S.

Joseph Bentley Bennett (April 21, 1859 – November 7, 1923) was a U.S. representative from Kentucky.

Born in Greenup County, Kentucky, Bennett attended the common schools and Greenup Academy, Greenup, Kentucky. He taught in the public schools. He studied law. He was admitted to the bar in 1878 and commenced practice in 1880. He entered the mercantile business in 1885. He served as judge of Greenup County 1894–1897. He was reelected in 1897 and served until 1901. He served as member of the Republican State central committee in 1900 and 1904.

Bennett was elected as a Republican to the Fifty-ninth, Sixtieth, and Sixty-first Congresses (March 4, 1905 – March 3, 1911). He was an unsuccessful candidate for reelection in 1910 to the Sixty-second Congress. He continued the practice of his profession until his death in Greenup, Kentucky, November 7, 1923. He was interred in Riverview Cemetery.

U.S. House of Representatives
Preceded by James N. Kehoe	Member of the U.S. House of Representatives from Kentucky's 9th congressional district 1905 – 1911	Succeeded by William J. Fields
