= Gene Snyder =

American politician (1928–2007)

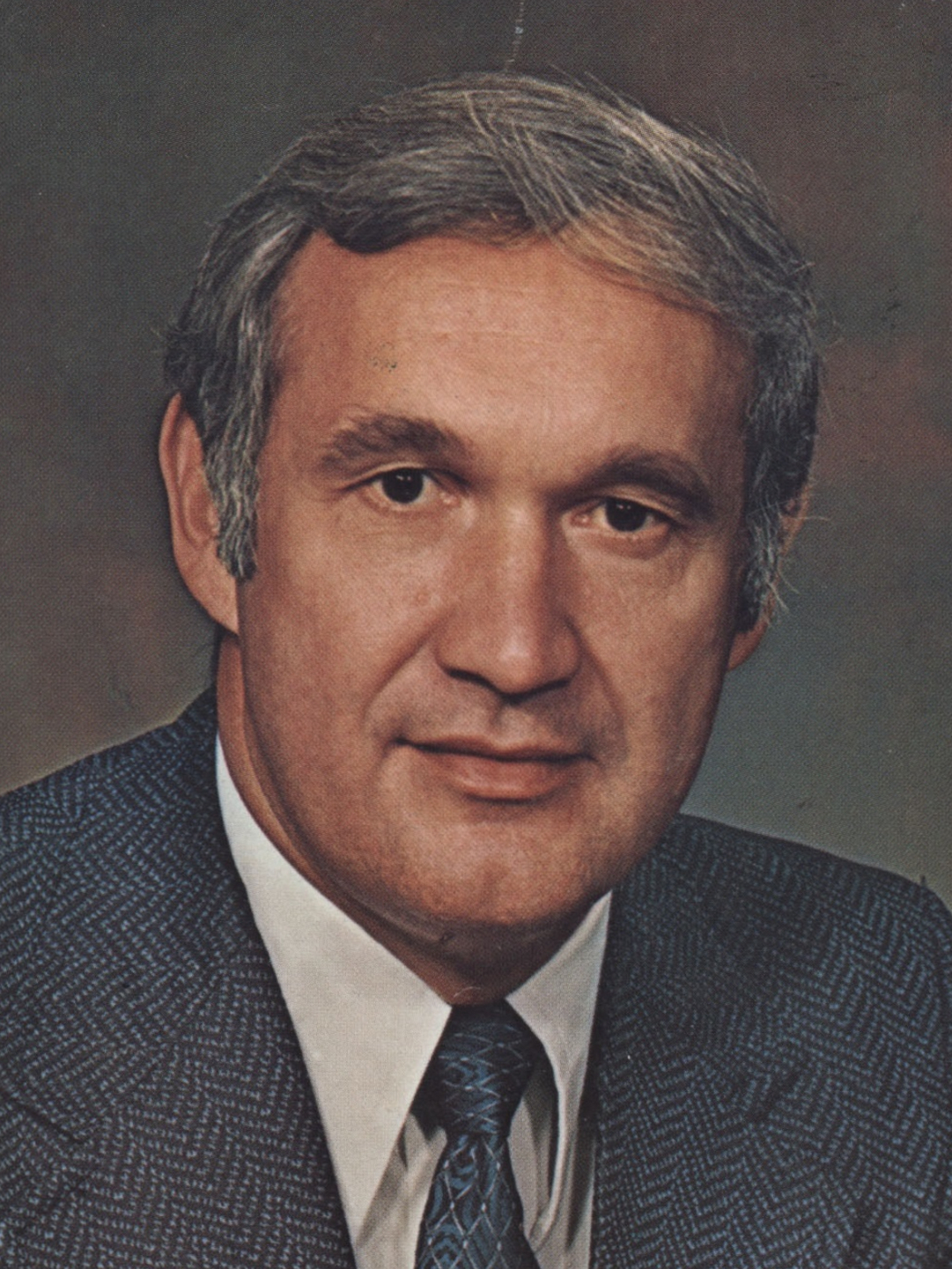
- Snyder in 1978

Member of the U.S. House of Representatives from Kentucky
- In office January 3, 1967 – January 3, 1987
- Preceded by: Frank Chelf
- Succeeded by: Jim Bunning
- Constituency: 4th district
- In office January 3, 1963 – January 3, 1965
- Preceded by: Frank W. Burke
- Succeeded by: Charles R. Farnsley
- Constituency: 3rd district

Personal details
- Born: Marion Eugene Snyder; January 26, 1928 Louisville, Kentucky, U.S.
- Died: February 16, 2007 (aged 79) Naples, Florida, U.S.
- Party: Republican
- Education: University of Louisville; Jefferson School of Law
- Occupation: Attorney

Marion Eugene Snyder (January 26, 1928 – February 16, 2007) was an American politician elected as a Republican to the United States House of Representatives from two different districts in his native Kentucky.

== Background ==
Snyder was born in Louisville and attended public schools there, having graduated from duPont Manual High School. He studied at the University of Louisville and graduated from the Jefferson School of Law. He began a career as a lawyer in Louisville in 1950. In 1954, he became the city attorney in Jeffersontown, a post that he held for some four years. Snyder was elected as the magistrate for the first district of Jefferson County in the fall of 1957 and was re-elected in 1961. He also had several business interests in farming, real estate, insurance, and construction.

== Political life ==
Snyder was elected to the House of Representatives from Kentucky's 3rd congressional district, based in Louisville, in 1962. He was one of the few Republicans to vote against the Civil Rights Act of 1964, although he later voted in favor of the Civil Rights Act of 1968. A Barry M. Goldwater supporter, he was unseated in 1964 after only one term by former Louisville Mayor Charlie Farnsley, amid the gigantic Lyndon B. Johnson-Hubert H. Humphrey Democratic landslide that year.

Snyder then moved to nearby Oldham County, which was in the neighboring 4th District, and prepared for a run against 11-term incumbent Frank Chelf in 1966. The 4th by that time was rapidly trending Republican because of an influx of new residents from Cincinnati; it had absorbed most of the Kentucky side of the Cincinnati metro area in the 1960s round of redistricting. He took full advantage of this trend and defeated Chelf by almost eight points. He was re-elected eight times from this district with almost no difficulty. In 1984, however, Democrat Pat Mulloy ran a surprisingly strong campaign and almost unseated Snyder; only Ronald Reagan's landslide win in Kentucky (by almost twenty points) helped Snyder remain in office. Rather than face Mulloy again, Snyder chose not to seek an 11th term in 1986. The seat then went to the Republican Jim Bunning, who in 1983 had been the unsuccessful Republican gubernatorial nominee against Martha Layne Collins.

In 1982, Congressman Snyder secured federal funds to build a beltway around Louisville. For this reason, a portion of I-265 was named for him in 1986. The federal courthouse building in Louisville and a general aviation airport near Falmouth, Kentucky (K62) also bear his name.

Snyder died in Naples, Florida in 2007.

U.S. House of Representatives
Preceded by Frank W. Burke	Member of the U.S. House of Representatives from Kentucky's 3rd congressional district 1963–1965	Succeeded by Charles R. Farnsley
Preceded by Frank Chelf	Member of the U.S. House of Representatives from Kentucky's 4th congressional district 1967–1987	Succeeded by Jim Bunning
Preceded by Pete McCloskey	Ranking Member of the House Merchant Marine and Fisheries Committee; 1981–1983	Succeeded by Edwin B. Forsythe
Preceded by Don Clausen	Ranking Member of the House Public Works and Transportation Committee; 1983–1987	Succeeded by John Paul Hammerschmidt
