= Chester O. Carrier =

American politician

Member of the U.S. House of Representatives from Kentucky's 4th district
- In office November 30, 1943 – January 3, 1945
- Preceded by: Edward W. Creal
- Succeeded by: Frank Chelf

Personal details
- Born: Chester Otto Carrier; May 5, 1897 Brownsville, Kentucky
- Died: September 24, 1980 (aged 83) North Seminole, Florida
- Party: Republican
- Occupation: Lawyer

Chester Otto Carrier (May 5, 1897 – September 24, 1980) was a U.S. representative from Kentucky.

Born on a farm near Brownsville, Edmonson County, Kentucky, Carrier attended the public schools of Grayson County, Kentucky, West Virginia University, and was graduated from the law department of the University of Louisville in 1924. He engaged in ranching in Wyoming for one year and took up railroading in Pennsylvania in 1920. He was admitted to the bar in 1923 and commenced practice in Leitchfield, Kentucky. He served as county attorney of Grayson County from 1925 to 1943.

Carrier was elected as a Republican to the Seventy-eighth Congress to fill the vacancy caused by the death of Edward W. Creal and served from November 30, 1943, to January 3, 1945. He was an unsuccessful candidate for reelection in 1944 to the Seventy-ninth Congress. He resumed the practice of law in Leitchfield. He retired to North Seminole, Florida, where he died September 24, 1980. He was interred in Clarkson Baptist Cemetery, Clarkson, Kentucky.

U.S. House of Representatives
Preceded by Edward W. Creal	Member of the U.S. House of Representatives from Kentucky's 4th congressional district November 30, 1943 – January 3, 1945	Succeeded by Frank Chelf
