= Cap R. Carden =

American politician

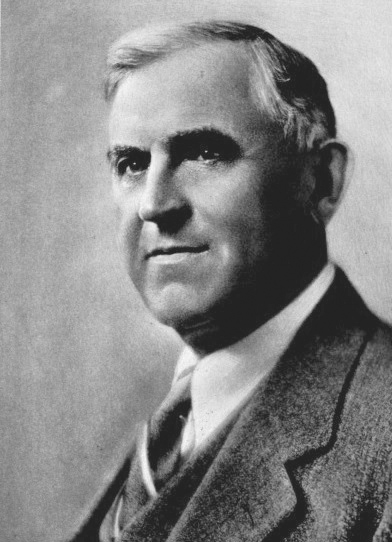
- Frontispiece of 1936's Cap Robert Carden, Late a Representative

Member of the U.S. House of Representatives from Kentucky
- In office March 4, 1931 – June 13, 1935
- Preceded by: John D. Craddock
- Succeeded by: Edward W. Creal
- Constituency: 4th district (1931-33, 1935); At-large district (1933-35)

Personal details
- Born: December 17, 1866 Munfordville, Kentucky, US
- Died: June 13, 1935 (aged 68) Louisville, Kentucky, US
- Resting place: Munfordville Cemetery, Munfordville, Kentucky, US
- Party: Democratic
- Spouse: Mamie Hubbard Carden (m. 1900)
- Children: 2
- Education: Bowling Green Business and Normal School (attended)
- Profession: Attorney

Cap Robert Carden (December 17, 1866 – June 13, 1935) was a U.S. representative from Kentucky.

Carden was born on a farm near Munfordville, Kentucky on December 17, 1866, a son of William P. Carden and Frances M. (King) Carden. Carden attended the rural schools and Bowling Green (Kentucky) Business and Normal School (now Western Kentucky University). He taught school for several years, studied law, was admitted to the bar in 1895 and commenced practice in Munfordville, Kentucky. He also engaged in agricultural pursuits and in banking. He was sheriff of Hart County from 1887 to 1890. He was elected county attorney of Hart County in 1890 and served from 1891 to 1894. He served as master commissioner of the circuit court of Hart County from 1900 to 1915.

Carden was elected as a Democrat to the Seventy-second, Seventy-third, and Seventy-fourth Congresses and served from March 4, 1931, until his death in Louisville, Kentucky, on June 13, 1935. He was interred in Munfordville Cemetery, Munfordville, Kentucky.

== See also ==
- List of members of the United States Congress who died in office (1900–1949)

U.S. House of Representatives
Preceded by John D. Craddock	Member of the U.S. House of Representatives from Kentucky's 4th congressional district 1931–1933	Succeeded by District inactive
Preceded by Seat created	Member of the U.S. House of Representatives from Kentucky's at-large congressional district 1933–1935	Succeeded by Seat eliminated
Preceded by District re-established	Member of the U.S. House of Representatives from Kentucky's 4th congressional district 1935	Succeeded by Edward W. Creal
