= Samuel J. Pugh =

American politician

Samuel Johnson Pugh
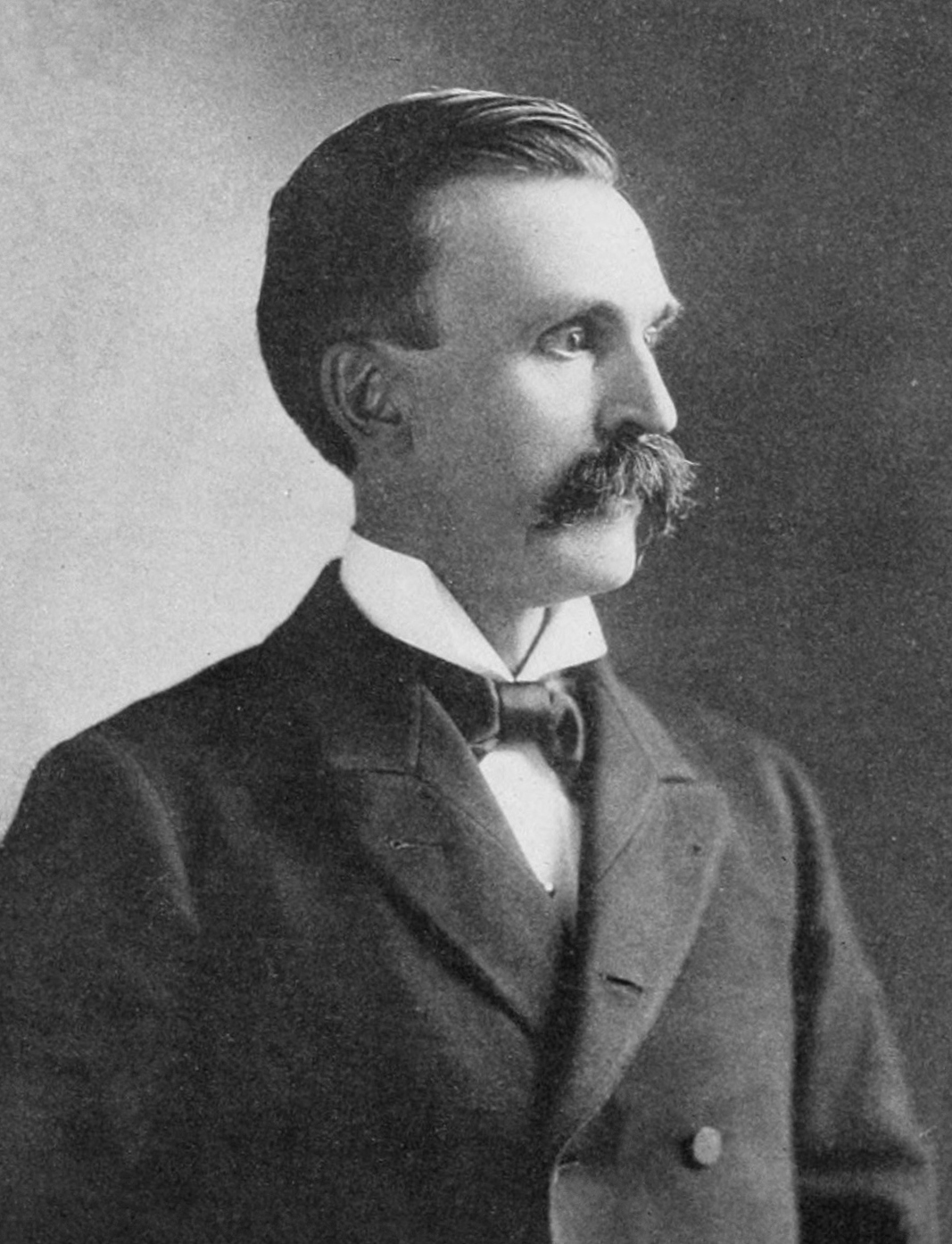

Member of the U.S. House of Representatives from Kentucky's 9th district
- In office March 4, 1895 – March 3, 1901
- Preceded by: Thomas H. Paynter
- Succeeded by: James Nicholas Kehoe

Member of the Kentucky Senate from the 31st district
- In office January 1, 1894 – January 1, 1896
- Preceded by: Garrett S. Wall
- Succeeded by: J. D. Rummans

Personal details
- Born: January 28, 1850 Greenup County, Kentucky
- Died: April 17, 1922 (aged 72) Vanceburg, Kentucky
- Resting place: Greenlawn Cemetery
- Party: Republican
- Education: Centre College
- Profession: Lawyer

Samuel Johnson Pugh (January 28, 1850 – April 17, 1922) was a U.S. representative from Kentucky.

Born in Greenup County, Kentucky, Pugh moved with his parents to Lewis County in 1852. He attended Chandler's Select School, Rand's Academy, and Centre College, Danville, Kentucky.

He studied law and was admitted to the bar, commencing practice in Vanceburg, Kentucky.

He held the following positions:

- City attorney, 1872–1873
- Master commissioner of the circuit court, 1874–1880
- County attorney, 1878–1886
- County judge, 1886–1890
- Delegate to the State constitutional convention, 1890–1891
- State senator, 1893–1894

Pugh was elected November 6, 1894 as a Republican to the 54th, 55th, and 56th Congresses (March 4, 1895 – March 3, 1901).

He resumed the practice of law in Vanceburg, Kentucky and died there April 17, 1922. He was interred in Woodland Cemetery.

U.S. House of Representatives
Preceded by Thomas H. Paynter	Member of the U.S. House of Representatives from Kentucky's 9th congressional district 1895 – 1901	Succeeded by James N. Kehoe
