= Edward W. Creal =

American politician

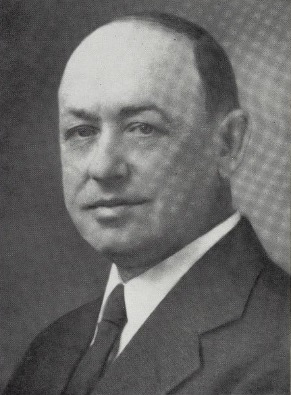
- Frontispiece of 1946's Edward Wester Creal, Late a Representative

Member of the U.S. House of Representatives from Kentucky's 4th district
- In office November 5, 1935 – October 13, 1943
- Preceded by: Cap R. Carden
- Succeeded by: Chester Carrier

Personal details
- Born: Edward Wester Creal; November 20, 1883 LaRue County, Kentucky
- Died: October 13, 1943 (aged 59) Hodgenville, Kentucky
- Party: Democratic Party
- Education: Centre College
- Occupation: lawyer

Edward Wester Creal (November 20, 1883 – October 13, 1943) was a U.S. representative from Kentucky.

Born in a log house in LaRue County, Kentucky near Mount Sherman, Kentucky, Creal attended the public schools of Hart and LaRue Counties, Kentucky. He taught school for nine years in LaRue County and between teaching terms attended Southern Normal School at Bowling Green, Kentucky, and East Lynn College at Buffalo, Kentucky. He was graduated from the law department of Centre College in Danville, Kentucky, in 1906. He was admitted to the bar in 1904 and commenced practice in Hodgenville, Kentucky, in 1910. County superintendent of schools of LaRue County, Kentucky from 1910 to 1918. County attorney 1918–1928. Commonwealth attorney 1929–1936. He was owner and publisher of a weekly newspaper in Hodgenville, Kentucky, from 1918 until the time of his death. He served as member of the Democratic State executive committee 1924–1940.

Creal was elected as a Democrat to the Seventy-fourth Congress to fill the vacancy caused by the death of Cap R. Carden. He was reelected to the Seventy-fifth and to the three succeeding Congresses and served from November 5, 1935, until his death in Hodgenville, Kentucky, on October 13, 1943. He was interred in Red Hill Cemetery.

== See also ==
- List of members of the United States Congress who died in office (1900–1949)

U.S. House of Representatives
| Preceded by Cap R. Carden | Member of the U.S. House of Representatives from Kentucky's 4th congressional district November 5, 1935 – October 13, 1943 | Succeeded by Chester Carrier |
