= Munfordville, Kentucky =

- City
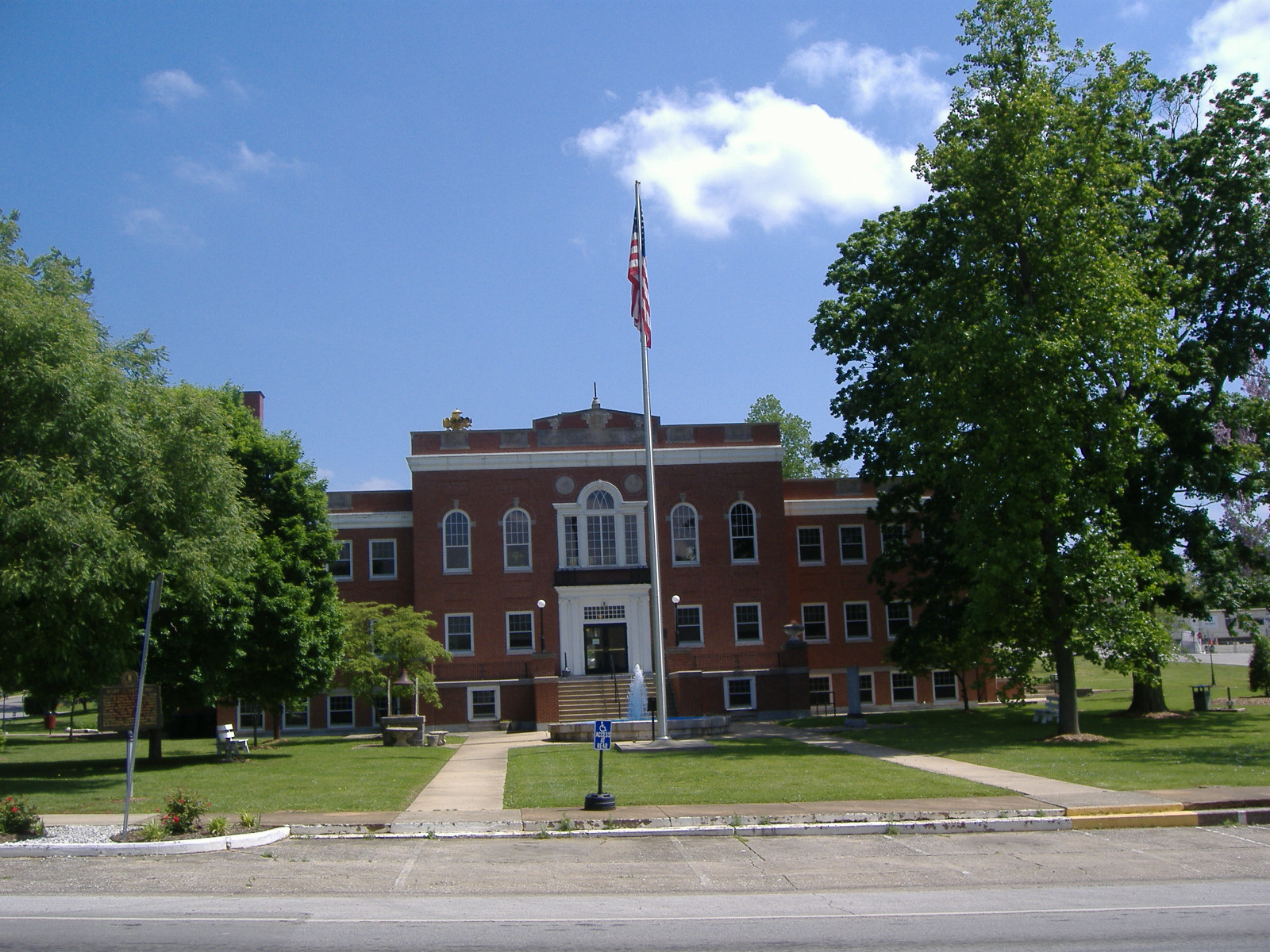
- Hart County Courthouse in Munfordville

- Location of Munfordville in Hart County, Kentucky.
- Coordinates: 37°16′36″N 85°53′52″W
- Country: United States
- State: Kentucky
- County: Hart
- Incorporated: 1880
- Named for: a local landowner

Area
  - Total: 2.25 sq mi (5.82 km^{2})
  - Land: 2.24 sq mi (5.80 km^{2})
  - Water: 0.0077 sq mi (0.02 km^{2})
- Elevation: 614 ft (187 m)

Population (2020)
  - Total: 1,686
  - Estimate (2022): 1,701
  - Density: 752.6/sq mi (290.59/km^{2})
- Time zone: UTC-6 (Central (CST))
  - Summer (DST): UTC-5 (CDT)
- ZIP code: 42765
- Area codes: 270 & 364
- FIPS code: 21-54570
- GNIS feature ID: 0499104
- Website: munfordvilleky.com

Munfordville is a home rule-class city in, and the county seat of, Hart County, Kentucky, United States. As of the 2020 census, Munfordville had a population of 1,686.

== History ==
The settlement was once known as "Big Buffalo Crossing". The current name came from Richard Jones Munford, who donated the land to establish the new county seat in 1816. Munfordville was incorporated in 1858.

In 1862, the Civil War Battle of Munfordville took place in the town.

== Geography ==
Munfordville is located in central Hart County at 37°16′36″N 85°53′52″W (37.276608, -85.897822), on the north side of the Green River. U.S. Route 31W is Munfordville's Main Street, while Interstate 65 passes just northwest of town, with access from Exit 65. I-65 leads north 32 miles (51 km) to Elizabethtown and southwest 40 miles (64 km) to Bowling Green.

According to the United States Census Bureau, Munfordville has a total area of 2.2 square miles (5.8 km^{2}), of which 0.01 square miles (0.03 km^{2}), or 0.47%, are water.

== Demographics ==
Historical population
Census	Pop.	Note	%±
1830	194		—
1840	274		41.2%
1860	265		—
1870	249		−6.0%
1880	274		10.0%
1900	440		—
1910	475		8.0%
1920	583		22.7%
1930	549		−5.8%
1940	832		51.5%
1950	894		7.5%
1960	1,157		29.4%
1970	1,233		6.6%
1980	1,783		44.6%
1990	1,556		−12.7%
2000	1,563		0.4%
2010	1,615		3.3%
2020	1,686		4.4%
2022 (est.)	1,701		0.9%
U.S. Decennial Census

=== 2020 census ===
As of the 2020 census, Munfordville had a population of 1,686. The median age was 41.8 years. 20.4% of residents were under the age of 18 and 19.9% of residents were 65 years of age or older. For every 100 females there were 103.9 males, and for every 100 females age 18 and over there were 103.3 males age 18 and over.

0.0% of residents lived in urban areas, while 100.0% lived in rural areas.

There were 720 households in Munfordville, of which 25.6% had children under the age of 18 living in them. Of all households, 31.1% were married-couple households, 21.4% were households with a male householder and no spouse or partner present, and 41.0% were households with a female householder and no spouse or partner present. About 38.9% of all households were made up of individuals and 18.5% had someone living alone who was 65 years of age or older.

There were 839 housing units, of which 14.2% were vacant. The homeowner vacancy rate was 0.9% and the rental vacancy rate was 8.8%.

Racial composition as of the 2020 census
Race	Number	Percent
White	1,430	84.8%
Black or African American	151	9.0%
American Indian and Alaska Native	0	0.0%
Asian	11	0.7%
Native Hawaiian and Other Pacific Islander	0	0.0%
Some other race	19	1.1%
Two or more races	75	4.4%
Hispanic or Latino (of any race)	50	3.0%

=== 2000 census ===
As of the census of 2000, there were 1,563 people, 698 households, and 418 families residing in the city. The population density was 619.0 inhabitants per square mile (239.0/km^{2}). There were 776 housing units at an average density of 307.3 per square mile (118.6/km^{2}). The racial makeup of the city was 87.33% White, 11.45% Black or African American, 0.13% Asian, 0.13% from other races, and 0.96% from two or more races. Hispanic or Latino of any race were 1.09% of the population.

There were 698 households, out of which 23.4% had children under the age of 18 living with them, 41.4% were married couples living together, 14.9% had a female householder with no husband present, and 40.0% were non-families. 36.5% of all households were made up of individuals, and 19.3% had someone living alone who was 65 years of age or older. The average household size was 2.18 and the average family size was 2.82.

The age distribution was 20.7% under the age of 18, 8.8% from 18 to 24, 23.7% from 25 to 44, 24.3% from 45 to 64, and 22.6% who were 65 years of age or older. The median age was 42 years. For every 100 females, there were 82.8 males. For every 100 females age 18 and over, there were 77.1 males.

The median income for a household in the city was $18,015, and the median income for a family was $26,333. Males had a median income of $25,417 versus $20,417 for females. The per capita income for the city was $11,447. About 23.7% of families and 26.2% of the population were below the poverty line, including 33.9% of those under age 18 and 25.8% of those age 65 or over.

=== Demographic estimates ===
In 2010, Munfordville had the 20th-lowest median household income of all places in the United States with a population over 1,000.

=== Amish settlement ===
The Amish settlement near Munfordville was founded in 1989. It has ties to the Geauga Amish settlement in Ohio, from where many of the Munfordville Amish came. It is the fastest-growing Amish settlement in America and had 14 church districts and a total population of about 1,800 as of 2013.

== Education ==
Munfordville has a lending library, the Hart County Public Library.

== Notable people ==
Several government officials were born in Munfordville. Thomas John Wood, a US Army major general, and Simon B. Buckner Sr, a Confederate lieutenant general, knew each other as boys but then fought on opposing sides during the American Civil War. Buckner became governor of Kentucky (1887–1891) and ran unsuccessfully for vice president of the United States (1896). His son, Simon Bolivar Buckner, Jr., was also born in Munfordville and served as a lieutenant general during World War II. Thelma Loyace Hawkins Stovall was a pioneering female Southern politician who won several statewide elective offices in Kentucky.

Poet, Davis McCombs, grew up in Munfordville.

== See also ==
- Johnson Springs
