= List of United States representatives in the 20th Congress =

This is a complete list of United States representatives during the 20th United States Congress listed by seniority. For the most part, representatives are ranked by the beginning of their terms in office.

As an historical article, the districts and party affiliations listed reflect those during the 20th Congress (March 4, 1827 – March 3, 1829). Seats and party affiliations on similar lists for other congresses will be different for certain members.

This article describes the criteria for seniority in the House of Representatives and sets out the list of members by seniority. It is prepared on the basis of the interpretation of seniority applied to the House of Representatives in the current congress. In the absence of information to the contrary, it is presumed that the twenty-first-century practice is identical to the seniority customs used during the 20th Congress.

== House seniority ==
Seniority in the House, for representatives with unbroken service, depends on the date on which the members first term began. That date is either the start of the Congress (March 4 in odd numbered years, for the era up to and including the 73rd Congress starting in 1933) or the date of a special election during the Congress. Since many members start serving on the same day as others, ranking between them is based on alphabetical order by the last name of the representative.

Representatives, in early congresses, were often elected after the legal start of the Congress. Such representatives are attributed with unbroken seniority, from the legal start of the congressional term, if they were the first person elected to a seat in a Congress. The date of the election is indicated in a note.

The seniority date is normally taken from the members entry in the Biographical Directory of the United States Congress, except where the date given is the legal start of the Congress and the actual election (for someone who was not the first person elected to the seat in that Congress) was later. The date of election is taken from United States Congressional Elections 1788-1997. In a few instances the latter work provides dates, for the start and end of terms, which correct those in the Biographical Directory.

The Biographical Directory normally uses the date of a special election, as the seniority date. However, mostly in early congresses, the date of the member taking his seat can be the one given. The date of the special election is mentioned in a note to the list below, when that date is not used as the seniority date by the Biographical Directory.

Representatives who returned to the House, after having previously served, are credited with service equal to one less than the total number of terms they served. When a representative has served a prior term of less than two terms (i.e. prior term minus one equals less than one), he is ranked above all others whose service begins on the same day.

== Leadership ==
In this Congress the only formal leader was the speaker of the House. A speakership election was held on December 3, 1827. Andrew Stevenson (J-VA) defeated John W. Taylor (A-NY), the speaker in the last Congress, to be elected on the first ballot.

| Candidate | 1st ballot |
|---|---|
| Andrew Stevenson (J-VA) | 104 |
| John W. Taylor (A-NY) | 094 |
| Philip P. Barbour (J-VA) | 004 |
| Scattering votes | 003 |

The title Dean of the House (sometimes known, in the nineteenth century, as Father of the House) was held by the member with the longest continuous service. It was not a formal leadership position.

== Standing committees ==
The House created its first standing committee, on April 13, 1789. There were twenty-seven standing committees, listed in the rules used by the 20th Congress.

Committees, in this period, were normally appointed for a session at a time by the speaker. However the resolution of March 30, 1816, which created the committees on departmental expenditures and Expenditures on Public Buildings, provided for those standing committees to be appointed for the whole Congress.

This list refers to the standing committees of the House in the 20th Congress, the year of establishment as a standing committee, the number of members assigned to the committee and the dates of appointment in each session (or if appropriate for the Congress), the end of the session (if appropriate) and its chairman. Chairmen, who were reappointed after serving at the end of the previous Congress, are indicated by an *.

The first session was December 3, 1827 – May 26, 1828 (175 days) and the second session was December 1, 1828 – March 3, 1829 (93 days).

| No. | Committee | From | Members | Term | Chairman |
|---|---|---|---|---|---|
| 1 | Accounts | 1805 | 3 | December 6, 1827 – May 26, 1828 | *Samuel C. Allen (A-MA) |
| 1 | Accounts | 1805 | 3 | December 3, 1828 – March 3, 1829 | *Samuel C. Allen (A-MA) |
| 2 | Agriculture | 1820 | 7 | December 6, 1827 – May 26, 1828 | *Stephen Van Rensselaer (A-NY) |
| 2 | Agriculture | 1820 | 7 | December 3, 1828 – March 3, 1829 | *Stephen Van Rensselaer (A-NY) |
| 3 | Claims | 1794 | 7 | December 6, 1827 – May 26, 1828 | *Lewis Williams (A-NC) |
| 3 | Claims | 1794 | 7 | December 3, 1828 – March 3, 1829 | William McCoy (J-VA) |
| 4 | Commerce | 1795 | 7 | December 6, 1827 – May 26, 1828 | Churchill C. Cambreleng (J-NY) |
| 4 | Commerce | 1795 | 7 | December 3, 1828 – March 3, 1829 | Churchill C. Cambreleng (J-NY) |
| 5 | District of Columbia | 1808 | 7 | December 6, 1827 – May 26, 1828 | *Mark Alexander (J-VA) |
| 5 | District of Columbia | 1808 | 7 | December 3, 1828 – March 3, 1829 | *Mark Alexander (J-VA) |
| 6 | Elections | 1789 | 7 | December 6, 1827 – May 26, 1828 | *John Sloane (A-OH) |
| 6 | Elections | 1789 | 7 | December 3, 1828 – March 3, 1829 | John Anderson (J-ME) |
| 7 | Expenditures in the Navy Department | 1816 | 3 | December 6, 1827-March 3, 1829 | Peter Little (A-MD) |
| 8 | Expenditures in the Post Office Department | 1816 | 3 | December 6, 1827-March 3, 1829 | Gabriel Holmes (J-NC) |
| 9 | Expenditures in the State Department | 1816 | 3 | December 6, 1827-March 3, 1829 | John Blair (J-TN) |
| 10 | Expenditures in the Treasury Department | 1816 | 3 | December 6, 1827-March 3, 1829 | Thomas H. Hall (J-NC) |
| 11 | Expenditures in the War Department | 1816 | 3 | December 6, 1827-March 3, 1829 | Charles E. Haynes (J-GA) |
| 12 | Expenditures on Public Buildings | 1816 | 3 | December 6, 1827-March 3, 1829 | Michael C. Sprigg (J-MD) |
| 13 | Foreign Affairs | 1822 | 7 | December 6, 1827 – May 26, 1828 | Edward Everett (A-MA) |
| 13 | Foreign Affairs | 1822 | 7 | December 3, 1828 – March 3, 1829 | Edward Everett (A-MA) |
| 14 | Indian Affairs | 1821 | 7 | December 6, 1827 – May 26, 1828 | William McLean (A-OH) |
| 14 | Indian Affairs | 1821 | 7 | December 3, 1828 – March 3, 1829 | William McLean (A-OH) |
| 15 | Judiciary | 1813 | 7 | December 6, 1827 – May 26, 1828 | Philip P. Barbour (J-VA) |
| 15 | Judiciary | 1813 | 7 | December 3, 1828 – March 3, 1829 | Philip P. Barbour (J-VA) |
| 16 | Manufactures | 1819 | 7 | December 6, 1827 – May 26, 1828 | *Rollin C. Mallary (A-VT) |
| 16 | Manufactures | 1819 | 7 | December 3, 1828 – March 3, 1829 | *Rollin C. Mallary (A-VT) |
| 17 | Military Affairs | 1822 | 7 | December 6, 1827 – May 26, 1828 | James Hamilton Jr. (J-SC) |
| 17 | Military Affairs | 1822 | 7 | December 3, 1828 – March 3, 1829 | William Drayton (J-SC) |
| 18 | Military Pensions | 1825 | 7 | December 6, 1827 – May 26, 1828 | *Tristram Burges (A-RI) |
| 18 | Military Pensions | 1825 | 7 | December 3, 1828 – March 3, 1829 | James C. Mitchell (J-TN) |
| 19 | Naval Affairs | 1822 | 7 | December 6, 1827 – May 26, 1828 | Michael Hoffman (J-NY) |
| 19 | Naval Affairs | 1822 | 7 | December 3, 1828 – March 3, 1829 | Michael Hoffman (J-NY) |
| 20 | Post Office and Post Roads | 1808 | 7 | December 6, 1827 – May 26, 1828 | *Samuel D. Ingham (J-PA) |
| 20 | Post Office and Post Roads | 1808 | 7 | December 3, 1828 – March 3, 1829 | Samuel McKean (J-PA) |
| 21 | Private Land Claims | 1816 | 7 | December 6, 1827 – May 26, 1828 | *Richard A. Buckner (A-KY) |
| 21 | Private Land Claims | 1816 | 7 | December 3, 1828 – March 3, 1829 | *Richard A. Buckner (A-KY) |
| 22 | Public Expenditures | 1814 | 7 | December 6, 1827 – May 26, 1828 | Jeromus Johnson (J-NY) |
| 22 | Public Expenditures | 1814 | 7 | December 3, 1828 – March 3, 1829 | Jeromus Johnson (J-NY) |
| 23 | Public Lands | 1805 | 7 | December 6, 1827 – May 26, 1828 | Jacob C. Isacks (J-TN) |
| 23 | Public Lands | 1805 | 7 | December 3, 1828 – March 3, 1829 | Jacob C. Isacks (J-TN) |
| 24 | Revisal and Unfinished Business | 1795 | 3 | December 6, 1827 – May 26, 1828 | Dutee J. Pearce (A-RI) |
| 24 | Revisal and Unfinished Business | 1795 | 3 | December 3, 1828 – March 3, 1829 | Dutee J. Pearce (A-RI) |
| 25 | Revolutionary Claims | 1813 | 7 | December 6, 1827 – May 26, 1828 | George Wolf (J-PA) |
| 25 | Revolutionary Claims | 1813 | 7 | December 3, 1828 – March 3, 1829 | George Wolf (J-PA) |
| 26 | Territories | 1825 | 7 | December 6, 1827 – May 26, 1828 | *James Strong (A-NY) |
| 26 | Territories | 1825 | 7 | December 3, 1828 – March 3, 1829 | *James Strong (A-NY) |
| 27 | Ways and Means | 1802 | 7 | December 6, 1827 – May 26, 1828 | John Randolph (J-VA) |
| 27 | Ways and Means | 1802 | 7 | December 3, 1828 – March 3, 1829 | George McDuffie (J-SC) |

== List of representatives by seniority ==
A numerical rank is assigned to each of the 213 members initially elected to the 20th Congress. Other members, who were not the first person elected to a seat but who joined the House during the Congress, are not assigned a number.

Eight representatives-elect were not sworn in. One resigned before the Congress started (DE-al:McLane). Seven more left the Congress before it convened. Three representatives-elect died (KY-11:Young, ME-1:Burleigh. OH-8:Wilson) and four resigned (GA-1:Tatnall, GA-2:Forsyth, MA-1:Webster, NY-29:Evans). The list below includes the representatives-elect (with name in italics), with the seniority they would have held if sworn in.

Party designations of representatives used in this article are A for Anti-Jacksonian (a supporter of President John Quincy Adams) and J for Jacksonian (an ally of Andrew Jackson). Territorial Delegates have not been given a party label, as the Biographical Directory does not specify a party for Delegates in this Congress. Designations used for past service, in the 4th to 18th Congresses, are (DR) for Democratic-Republican members and (F) for Federalist representatives. For the 18th Congress only, each party is further divided based upon the presidential candidates supported. The prefixes used are A- for Adams-Clay supporters, C- for the followers of Crawford and J- for the Jackson men.

U.S. House seniority
| Rank | Representative | Party | District | Seniority date | Notes |
|---|---|---|---|---|---|
Fourteen consecutive terms
| 1 | Thomas Newton Jr. | A | VA-1 | March 4, 1801 | Previously served (DR) 1801-23 and (A-DR) 1823-25 while in the House. Elected to this Congress: April 9–30, 1827. Dean of the House. |
Thirteen non-consecutive terms
| 2 | John Randolph | J | VA-5 | March 4, 1827 | Previously served (DR) 1799–1813, 1815–17, 1819–23, (C-DR) 1823-25 and (J) March 4-December 26, 1825 while in the House. Elected to this Congress: April 9–30, 1827. Chairman: Ways and Means (1827–28). Last term while serving in the House until 23rd Congress |
Ten non-consecutive terms
| 3 | Willis Alston | J | NC-2 | March 4, 1825 | Previously served (DR) 1799–1815. Elected to this Congress: August 9, 1827. |
| 4 | Burwell Bassett | J | VA-8 | March 4, 1821 | Previously served (DR) 1805–13, 1815–19, 1821–23 and (C-DR) 1823-25 while in the House. Elected to this Congress: April 9–30, 1827. Last term while serving in the House. |
Nine consecutive terms
| 5 | William McCoy | J | VA-19 | March 4, 1811 | Previously served (DR) 1811-23 and (C-DR) 1823-25 while in the House. Elected to this Congress: April 9–30, 1827. Chairman: Claims (1828–29). |
Eight consecutive terms
| 6 | John W. Taylor | A | NY-17 | March 4, 1813 | Previously served (DR) 1813-23 and (A-DR) 1823-25 while in the House. |
Eight non-consecutive terms
| 7 | Lemuel Sawyer | J | NC-1 | March 4, 1825 | Previously served (DR) 1807-13 and 1817–23. Elected to this Congress: August 9, 1827. Last term while serving in the House. |
| 8 | Peter Little | A | MD-5 | September 2, 1816 | Previously served (DR) 1811–13, September 2, 1816–23 and (J-DR) 1823–25. Chairman: Expenditures in the Navy Department. Last term while serving in the House. |
Seven consecutive terms
| 9 | Lewis Williams | A | NC-13 | March 4, 1815 | Previously served (DR) 1815-23 and (C-DR) 1823-25 while in the House. Elected to this Congress: August 9, 1827. Chairman: Claims (1827–28). |
Seven non-consecutive terms
| 10 | Philip P. Barbour | J | VA-11 | March 4, 1827 | Previously served (DR) September 19, 1814–23 and (C-DR) 1823-25 while in the House. Elected to this Congress: April 9–30, 1827. Chairman: Judiciary. |
| 11 | Lewis Condict | A | NJ-al | October 9, 1821 | Previously served (DR) 1811–17, October 9, 1821–23 and (J-DR) 1823-25 while in the House. |
| 12 | John Forsyth | J | GA-2 | March 4, 1823 | Previously served (DR) 1813-November 23, 1818 (resigned as Representative to 15th and Representative-elect to 16th Congress) and (C-DR) 1823-25 while in the House. Resigned, as Representative-elect: November 7, 1827. |
Six consecutive terms
| 13 | Samuel C. Allen | A | MA-7 | March 4, 1817 | Previously served (F) 1817-23 and (A-F) 1823-25 while in the House. Chairman: Accounts. Last term while serving in the House. |
| 14 | John Floyd | J | VA-20 | March 4, 1817 | Previously served (DR) 1817-23 and (C-DR) 1823-25 while in the House. Elected to this Congress: April 9–30, 1827. Last term while serving in the House. |
| 15 | Louis McLane | J | DE-al | March 4, 1817 | Previously served (F) 1817-23 and (C-F) 1823-25 while in the House. Resigned, as Representative-elect, before Congress started: January 16, 1827. |
| 16 | Charles F. Mercer | A | VA-14 | March 4, 1817 | Previously served (F) 1817-23 and (C-DR) 1823-25 while in the House. Elected to this Congress: April 9–30, 1827. |
| 17 | Starling Tucker | J | SC-9 | March 4, 1817 | Previously served (DR) 1817-23 and (J-DR) 1823-25 while in the House. |
Six non-consecutive terms
| 18 | Edward Livingston | J | LA-1 | March 4, 1823 | Previously served (DR-NY) 1795-1801 and (J-DR) 1823-25 while in the House. Last term while serving in the House. |
| 19 | John Reed Jr. | A | MA-13 | March 4, 1821 | Previously served (F) 1813–17, 1821–23 and (A-F) 1823-25 while in the House. |
| 20 | John Culpepper | A | NC-7 | March 4, 1827 | Previously served (F) 1807-January 2, 1808, February 23, 1808–09, 1813–17, 1819–21 and (A-F) 1823-25 while in the House. Elected to this Congress: August 9, 1827. Last term while serving in the House. |
| 21 | Samuel D. Ingham | J | PA-8 | October 8, 1822 | Previously served (DR) 1813-July 6, 1818, October 8, 1822–23 and (J-DR) 1823-25 while in the House. Chairman: Post Office and Post Roads (1827–28). |
Five consecutive terms
| 22 | Mark Alexander | J | VA-4 | March 4, 1819 | Previously served (DR) 1819-23 and (C-DR) 1823-25 while in the House. Elected to this Congress: April 9–30, 1827. Chairman: District of Columbia. |
| 23 | Thomas Metcalfe | A | KY-2 | March 4, 1819 | Previously served (DR) 1819-23 and (A-DR) 1823-25 while in the House. Elected to this Congress: August 6, 1827. Resigned while still serving in the House: June 1, 1828. |
| 24 | John Sloane | A | OH-12 | March 4, 1819 | Previously served (DR) 1819-23 and (A-DR) 1823-25 while in the House. Chairman: Elections (1827–28). Last term while serving in the House. |
| 25 | Silas Wood | A | NY-1 | March 4, 1819 | Previously served (F) 1819-23 and (A-DR) 1823-25 while in the House. Last term while serving in the House. |
| 26 | William S. Archer | J | VA-3 | January 3, 1820 | Previously served (DR) January 3, 1820–23 and (C-DR) 1823-25 while in the House. Elected to this Congress: April 9–30, 1827. |
| 27 | Rollin C. Mallary | A | VT-2 | January 13, 1820 | Previously served (DR) January 13, 1820–23 and (A-DR) 1823-25 while in the House. Chairman: Manufactures |
Five non-consecutive terms
| 28 | Philemon Beecher | A | OH-9 | March 4, 1823 | Previously served (F) 1817-21 and (A-DR) 1823-25 while in the House. Last term while serving in the House. |
| 29 | Thomas H. Hall | J | NC-3 | March 4, 1827 | Previously served (DR) 1817-23 and (C-DR) 1823-25 while in the House. Elected to this Congress: August 9, 1827. Chairman: Expenditures in the Treasury Department. |
| 30 | Alexander Smyth | J | VA-22 | March 4, 1827 | Previously served (DR) 1817-23 and (C-DR) 1823-25 while in the House. Elected to this Congress: April 9–30, 1827. |
| 31 | Henry R. Storrs | A | NY-14 | March 4, 1823 | Previously served (F) 1817-21 and (A-F) 1823-25 while in the House. |
| 32 | Daniel Webster | A | MA-1 | March 4, 1823 | Previously served (F-NH) 1813-17 and (A-F) 1823-25 while in the House. Resigned, as Representative-elect: May 30, 1827. |
| 33 | John Sergeant | A | PA-2 | March 4, 1827 | Previously served (F) October 10, 1815-23 while in the House. Elected to this Congress, by special election, after general election tied: October 9, 1827. Last term while serving in the House until 25th Congress. |
| 34 | John Taliaferro | A | VA-13 | March 24, 1824 | Previously served (DR) 1801–03, December 2, 1811–13 and (C-DR) March 24, 1824-25 while in the House. Elected to this Congress: April 9–30, 1827. |
Four consecutive terms
| 35 | Noyes Barber | A | CT-al | March 4, 1821 | Previously served (DR) 1821-23 and (A-DR) 1823-25 while in the House. Elected to this Congress: April 12, 1827. |
| 36 | James Buchanan | J | PA-4 | March 4, 1821 | Previously served (F) 1821-23 and (J-F) 1823-25 while in the House. |
| 37 | Henry W. Connor | J | NC-11 | March 4, 1821 | Previously served (DR) 1821-23 and (J-DR) 1823-25 while in the House. Elected to this Congress: August 9, 1827. |
| 38 | Henry W. Dwight | A | MA-9 | March 4, 1821 | Previously served (F) 1821-23 and (A-F) 1823-25 while in the House. Elected to this Congress: March 5, 1827. |
| 39 | George Holcombe | J | NJ-al | March 4, 1821 | Previously served (DR) 1821-23 and (J-DR) 1823-25 while in the House. Died while still serving in the House: January 14, 1828. |
| 40 | John Long | A | NC-10 | March 4, 1821 | Previously served (DR) 1821-23 and (C-DR) 1823-25 while in the House. Elected to this Congress: August 9, 1827. Last term while serving in the House. |
| 41 | George McDuffie | J | SC-5 | March 4, 1821 | Previously served (DR) 1821-23 and (J-DR) 1823-25 while in the House. Chairman: Ways and Means (1828–29). |
| 42 | Gabriel Moore | J | AL-1 | March 4, 1821 | Previously served (DR) 1821-23 and (J-DR) 1823-25 while in the House. Elected to this Congress: August 6, 1827. Last term while serving in the House. |
| 43 | Andrew Stevenson | J | VA-9 | March 4, 1821 | Previously served (DR) 1821-23 and (C-DR) 1823-25 while in the House. Elected to this Congress: April 9–30, 1827. Speaker of the House. |
| 44 | Andrew Stewart | A | PA-14 | March 4, 1821 | Previously served (DR) 1821–23, (J-DR) 1823-25 and (J) 1825-27 while in the House. Last term while serving in the House until 22nd Congress. |
| 45 | Samuel Swan | A | NJ-al | March 4, 1821 | Previously served (DR) 1821-23 and (J-DR) 1823-25 while in the House. |
| 46 | Edward F. Tattnall | J | GA-1 | March 4, 1821 | Previously served (DR) 1821-23 and (C-DR) 1823-25 while in the House. Resigned, as Representative-elect in 1827. |
| 47 | Wiley Thompson | J | GA-3 | March 4, 1821 | Previously served (DR) 1821-23 and (C-DR) 1823-25 while in the House. |
| 48 | Joseph Vance | A | OH-4 | March 4, 1821 | Previously served (DR) 1821-23 and (A-DR) 1823-25 while in the House. |
| 49 | Thomas Whipple Jr. | A | NH-al | March 4, 1821 | Previously served (DR) 1821-23 and (A-DR) 1823-25 while in the House. Elected to this Congress: March 13, 1827. Last term while serving in the House. |
| 50 | Churchill C. Cambreleng | J | NY-3 | December 3, 1821 | Previously served (DR) 1821-23 and (C-DR) 1823-25 while in the House. Chairman: Commerce. |
| 51 | Stephen Van Rensselaer | A | NY-10 | February 27, 1822 | Previously served (F) February 27, 1822–23 and (A-F) 1823-25 while in the House. Chairman: Agriculture. Last term while serving in the House. |
| 52 | Jonathan Jennings | A | IN-2 | December 2, 1822 | Previously served Delegate November 27, 1809 – December 11, 1816; Representative (DR) December 2, 1822–23 and (J-DR) 1823-25 while in the House. |
| 53 | John Carter | J | SC-8 | December 11, 1822 | Previously served (DR) December 11, 1822–23 and (J-DR) 1823-25 while in the House. Last term while serving in the House. |
| 54 | James Hamilton Jr. | J | SC-2 | December 13, 1822 | Previously served (DR) December 13, 1822–23 and (J-DR) 1823-25 while in the House. Chairman: Military Affairs (1827–28). Last term while serving in the House. |
| 55 | John C. Wright | A | OH-11 | March 4, 1823 | Previously served (DR) 17th Congress, but resigned before term started and (A-DR) 1823-25 while in the House. Last term while serving in the House. |
Four non-consecutive terms
| 56 | John Roane | J | VA-12 | March 4, 1827 | Previously served (DR) 1809-15 while in the House. Elected to this Congress: April 9–30, 1827. |
| 57 | James Strong | A | NY-8 | March 4, 1823 | Previously served (F) 1819-21 and (A-F) 1823-25 while in the House. Chairman: Territories. |
| 58 | James Clark | A | KY-3 | August 1, 1825 | Previously served (DR) 1813–16. Elected to this Congress: August 6, 1827. |
Three consecutive terms
| 59 | John S. Barbour | J | VA-15 | March 4, 1823 | Previously served (C-DR) 1823-25 while in the House. Elected to this Congress: April 9–30, 1827. |
| 60 | Ichabod Bartlett | A | NH-al | March 4, 1823 | Previously served (A-DR) 1823-25 while in the House. Elected to this Congress: March 13, 1827. Last term while serving in the House. |
| 61 | Mordecai Bartley | A | OH-14 | March 4, 1823 | Previously served (A-DR) 1823-25 while in the House. |
| 62 | John Blair | J | TN-1 | March 4, 1823 | Previously served (J-DR) 1823-25 while in the House. Elected to this Congress: August 2–3, 1827. Chairman: Expenditures in the State Department. |
| 63 | William L. Brent | A | LA-3 | March 4, 1823 | Previously served (A-DR) 1823-25 while in the House. Last term while serving in the House. |
| 64 | Richard A. Buckner | A | KY-8 | March 4, 1823 | Previously served (A-DR) 1823-25 while in the House. Elected to this Congress: August 6, 1827. Chairman: Private Land Claims. Last term while in the House. |
| 65 | William Burleigh | A | ME-1 | March 4, 1823 | Previously served (A-DR) 1823-25 while in the House. Died, as Representative-elect: July 2, 1827. |
| 66 | Benjamin W. Crowninshield | A | MA-2 | March 4, 1823 | Previously served (A-DR) 1823-25 while in the House. |
| 67 | Henry H. Gurley | A | LA-2 | March 4, 1823 | Previously served (A-DR) 1823-25 while in the House. |
| 68 | Jacob C. Isacks | J | TN-4 | March 4, 1823 | Previously served (J-DR) 1823-25 while in the House. Elected to this Congress: August 2–3, 1827. Chairman: Public Lands. |
| 69 | George Kremer | J | PA-9 | March 4, 1823 | Previously served (J-DR) 1823–25. Last term while serving in the House. |
| 70 | Robert P. Letcher | A | KY-4 | March 4, 1823 | Previously served (A-DR) 1823–25. Elected to this Congress: August 6, 1827. |
| 71 | John Locke | A | MA-6 | March 4, 1823 | Previously served (A-DR) 1823-25 while in the House. Last term while serving in the House. |
| 72 | Henry C. Martindale | A | NY-18 | March 4, 1823 | Previously served (A-F) 1823-25 while in the House. |
| 73 | Dudley Marvin | A | NY-26 | March 4, 1823 | Previously served (A-DR) 1823–25. Last term while serving in the House until 30th Congress. |
| 74 | Samuel McKean | J | PA-9 | March 4, 1823 | Previously served (J-DR) 1823–25. Chairman: Post Office and Post Roads (1828–29). Last term while serving in the House. |
| 75 | John McKee | J | AL-2 | March 4, 1823 | Previously served (J-DR) 1823-25 while in the House. Elected to this Congress: August 6, 1827. Last term while serving in the House. |
| 76 | William McLean | A | OH-3 | March 4, 1823 | Previously served (A-DR) 1823–25. Chairman: Indian Affairs. Last term while serving in the House. |
| 77 | Daniel H. Miller | J | PA-3 | March 4, 1823 | Previously served (J-DR) 1823-25 while in the House. |
| 78 | Thomas P. Moore | J | KY-7 | March 4, 1823 | Previously served (J-DR) 1823–25. Elected to this Congress: August 6, 1827. Last term while serving in the House until 23rd Congress. |
| 79 | Jeremiah O'Brien | A | ME-6 | March 4, 1823 | Previously served (A-DR) 1823-25 while in the House. Last term while serving in the House. |
| 80 | George W. Owen | J | AL-3 | March 4, 1823 | Previously served (J-DR) 1823-25 while in the House. Elected to this Congress: August 6, 1827. Last term while serving in the House. |
| 81 | William C. Rives | J | VA-10 | March 4, 1823 | Previously served (C-DR) 1823-25 while in the House. Elected to this Congress: April 9–30, 1827. |
| 82 | Samuel F. Vinton | A | OH-7 | March 4, 1823 | Previously served (A-DR) 1823-25 while in the House. |
| 83 | Elisha Whittlesey | A | OH-13 | March 4, 1823 | Previously served (A-DR) 1823-25 while in the House. |
| 84 | Charles A. Wickliffe | J | KY-9 | March 4, 1823 | Previously served (J-DR) 1823-25 while in the House. Elected to this Congress: August 6, 1827. |
| 85 | James Wilson | A | PA-11 | March 4, 1823 | Previously served (J-DR) 1823-25 while in the House. Last term while serving in the House. |
| 86 | William Wilson | A | OH-8 | March 4, 1823 | Previously served (C-DR) 1823-25 while in the House. Died, as Representative-elect: June 6, 1827. |
| 87 | George Wolf | J | PA-8 | December 9, 1824 | Previously served (J-DR) December 9, 1824-25 while in the House. Chairman: Revolutionary Claims. |
| 88 | John Bailey | A | MA-10 | December 13, 1824 | Previously served (A-DR) December 13, 1824-25 while in the House. |
Three non-consecutive terms
| 89 | John D. Dickinson | A | NY-9 | March 4, 1827 | Previously served (F) 1819-23 while in the House. |
| 90 | Thomas R. Mitchell | J | SC-3 | March 4, 1825 | Previously served (DR) 1821-23 while in the House. Last term while serving in the House until 22nd Congress. |
| 91 | Elisha Phelps | A | CT-al | March 4, 1825 | Previously served (DR) 1819-21 while in the House. Elected to this Congress: April 12, 1827. Last term while serving in the House. |
| 92 | William Creighton Jr. | A | OH-6 | March 4, 1827 | Previously served (DR) May 4, 1813-17 while in the House. Resigned 1828. Last term while serving in the House until 21st Congress. |
Two consecutive terms
| 93 | William Addams | J | PA-7 | March 4, 1825 | Last term while serving in the House. |
| 94 | John Anderson | J | ME-2 | March 4, 1825 | Chairman: Elections (1828–29). |
| 95 | William Armstrong | A | VA-16 | March 4, 1825 | Elected to this Congress: April 9–30, 1827 |
| 96 | John Baldwin | A | CT-al | March 4, 1825 | Elected to this Congress: April 12, 1827. Last term while serving in the House. |
| 97 | John Barney | A | MD-5 | March 4, 1825 | Last term while serving in the House. |
| 98 | John Heritage Bryan | A | NC-4 | March 4, 1825 | Formerly (J) 1825–27. Elected to this Congress: August 9, 1827. Last term while serving in the House. |
| 99 | Tristam Burges | A | RI-al | March 4, 1825 | Elected to this Congress: August 30, 1827. Chairman: Military Pensions (1827–28). |
| 100 | Samuel P. Carson | J | NC-12 | March 4, 1825 | Elected to this Congress: August 9, 1827 |
| 101 | Nathaniel H. Claiborne | J | VA-7 | March 4, 1825 | Elected to this Congress: April 9–30, 1827 |
| 102 | Thomas Davenport | J | VA-6 | March 4, 1825 | Elected to this Congress: April 9–30, 1827 |
| 103 | John Davis | A | MA-5 | March 4, 1825 | |
| 104 | Clement Dorsey | A | MD-1 | March 4, 1825 | |
| 105 | Edward Everett | A | MA-4 | March 4, 1825 | Chairman: Foreign Affairs |
| 106 | James Findlay | J | OH-1 | March 4, 1825 | |
| 107 | Daniel G. Garnsey | J | NY-30 | March 4, 1825 | Last term while serving in the House. |
| 108 | John Hallock Jr. | J | NY-6 | March 4, 1825 | Last term while serving in the House. |
| 109 | Jonathan Harvey | J | NH-al | March 4, 1825 | Elected to this Congress: March 13, 1827 |
| 110 | Charles E. Haynes | J | GA-5 | March 4, 1825 | Chairman: Expenditures in the War Department |
| 111 | Joseph Healy | A | NH-al | March 4, 1825 | Elected to this Congress: March 13, 1827. Last term while serving in the House. |
| 112 | Michael Hoffman | J | NY-15 | March 4, 1825 | Chairman: Naval Affairs |
| 113 | Gabriel Holmes | J | NC-5 | March 4, 1825 | Elected to this Congress: August 9, 1827. Chairman: Expenditures in the Post Office Department. |
| 114 | Ralph I. Ingersoll | A | CT-al | March 4, 1825 | Elected to this Congress: April 12, 1827 |
| 115 | Jeromus Johnson | J | NY-3 | March 4, 1825 | Chairman: Public Expenditures. Last term while serving in the House. |
| 116 | John L. Kerr | A | MD-7 | March 4, 1825 | Last term while serving in the House until 22nd Congress |
| 117 | Joseph Lawrence | A | PA-15 | March 4, 1825 | Last term while serving in the House until 27th Congress |
| 118 | Joseph Lecompte | J | KY-6 | March 4, 1825 | Elected to this Congress: August 6, 1827 |
| 119 | John H. Marable | J | TN-8 | March 4, 1825 | Elected to this Congress: August 2–3, 1827. Last term. |
| 120 | Henry Markell | A | NY-16 | March 4, 1825 | Last term while serving in the House. |
| 121 | Orange Merwin | A | CT-al | March 4, 1825 | Elected to this Congress: April 12, 1827. Last term. |
| 122 | Charles Miner | A | PA-4 | March 4, 1825 | Last term while serving in the House. |
| 123 | James C. Mitchell | J | TN-3 | March 4, 1825 | Elected to this Congress: August 2–3, 1827. Chairman: Military Pensions (1828–29). Last term while serving in the House. |
| 124 | John Mitchell | J | PA-12 | March 4, 1825 | Last term while serving in the House. |
| 125 | Dutee J. Pearce | A | RI-al | March 4, 1825 | Elected to this Congress: August 30, 1827. Chairman: Revisal and Unfinished Business. |
| 126 | James K. Polk | J | TN-6 | March 4, 1825 | Elected to this Congress: August 2–3, 1827 |
| 127 | Peleg Sprague | A | ME-4 | March 4, 1825 | Elected to but did not serve in 21st Congress |
| 128 | James S. Stevenson | J | PA-16 | March 4, 1825 | Last term while serving in the House. |
| 129 | James Trezvant | J | VA-2 | March 4, 1825 | Elected to this Congress: April 9–30, 1827 |
| 130 | Ebenezer Tucker | A | NJ-al | March 4, 1825 | Last term while serving in the House. |
| 131 | Espy Van Horne | J | PA-9 | March 4, 1825 | Last term while serving in the House. |
| 132 | John Varnum | A | MA-3 | March 4, 1825 | |
| 133 | Gulian C. Verplanck | J | NY-3 | March 4, 1825 | |
| 134 | George E. Wales | A | VT-3 | March 4, 1825 | Last term while serving in the House. |
| 135 | Aaron Ward | A | NY-4 | March 4, 1825 | Last term while serving in the House until 22nd Congress |
| 136 | John Woods | A | OH-2 | March 4, 1825 | Last term while serving in the House. |
| 137 | William S. Young | A | KY-11 | March 4, 1825 | Elected to this Congress: August 6, 1827. Died, as Representative-elect: September 20, 1827. |
| 138 | Titus Brown | A | NH-al | March 8, 1825 | Elected to this Congress: March 13, 1827. Last term while serving in the House. |
| 139 | William Drayton | J | SC-1 | May 17, 1825 | Chairman: Military Affairs (1828–29) |
| 140 | Robert Orr Jr. | J | PA-16 | October 11, 1825 | Last term while serving in the House. |
| 141 | John C. Weems | J | MD-2 | February 1, 1826 | Last term while serving in the House. |
| 142 | William Haile | J | MS-al | July 10, 1826 | Resigned: September 12, 1828 |
| 143 | James W. Ripley | J | ME-5 | September 11, 1826 | |
| 144 | Daniel L. Barringer | J | NC-8 | December 4, 1826 | Elected to this Congress: August 9, 1827 |
| 145 | Chauncey Forward | J | PA-13 | December 4, 1826 | |
| 146 | Robert L. McHatton | J | KY-5 | December 7, 1826 | Elected to this Congress: August 6, 1827. Last term while serving in the House. |
Two non-consecutive terms
| 147 | Daniel A. A. Buck | A | VT-5 | March 4, 1827 | Previously served (A-DR) 1823–25. Last term while serving in the House. |
| 148 | Wilson Lumpkin | J | GA-4 | March 4, 1827 | Previously served (DR) 1815-17 while in the House. |
| 149 | Thomas J. Oakley | J | NY-5 | March 4, 1827 | Previously served (F) 1813-15 while in the House. Resigned May 9, 1828. |
| 150 | David Woodcock | J | NY-25 | March 4, 1827 | Previously served (DR) 1821–23. Last term while serving in the House. |
One term
| 151 | Robert Allen | J | VA-17 | March 4, 1827 | Elected to this Congress: April 9–30, 1827 |
| 152 | Samuel Anderson | A | PA-4 | March 4, 1827 | Only term while serving in the House. |
| 153 | David Barker Jr. | A | NH-al | March 4, 1827 | Elected to this Congress: March 13, 1827. Only term while serving in the House. |
| 154 | Stephen Barlow | J | PA-18 | March 4, 1827 | Only term while serving in the House. |
| 155 | Daniel D. Barnard | A | NY-27 | March 4, 1827 | Only term while serving in the House until 26th Congress. |
| 156 | Edward Bates | A | MO-al | March 4, 1827 | Only term while serving in the House. |
| 157 | Isaac C. Bates | A | MA-8 | March 4, 1827 | Elected to this Congress: May 14, 1827 |
| 158 | George O. Belden | J | NY-7 | March 4, 1827 | Only term while serving in the House. |
| 159 | John Bell | J | TN-7 | March 4, 1827 | Elected to this Congress: August 2–3, 1827 |
| 160 | Thomas H. Blake | A | IN-1 | March 4, 1827 | Only term while serving in the House. |
| 161 | Rudolph Bunner | J | NY-20 | March 4, 1827 | Only term while serving in the House. |
| 162 | Samuel Butman | A | ME-7 | March 4, 1827 | Elected to this Congress: September 27, 1827 |
| 163 | Samuel Chase | A | NY-13 | March 4, 1827 | Only term while serving in the House. |
| 164 | John C. Clark | J | NY-21 | March 4, 1827 | Only term while serving in the House until 25th Congress |
| 165 | Richard Coulter | J | PA-17 | March 4, 1827 | |
| 166 | Davy Crockett | J | TN-9 | March 4, 1827 | Elected to this Congress: August 2–3, 1827 |
| 167 | Henry Daniel | J | KY-1 | March 4, 1827 | Elected to this Congress: August 6, 1827 |
| 168 | John Davenport | A | OH-10 | March 4, 1827 | Only term while serving in the House. |
| 169 | Warren R. Davis | J | SC-6 | March 4, 1827 | |
| 170 | John I. De Graff | J | NY-12 | March 4, 1827 | Only term while serving in the House until 25th Congress |
| 171 | Robert Desha | J | TN-5 | March 4, 1827 | Elected to this Congress: August 2–3, 1827 |
| 172 | Joseph Duncan | J | IL-al | March 4, 1827 | |
| 173 | Jonas Earll Jr. | J | NY-23 | March 4, 1827 | |
| 174 | David E. Evans | J | NY-29 | March 4, 1827 | Resigned, as Representative-elect: May 2, 1827 |
| 175 | John Floyd | J | GA-7 | March 4, 1827 | Only term while serving in the House. |
| 176 | Tomlinson Fort | J | GA-6 | March 4, 1827 | Only term while serving in the House. |
| 177 | Joseph Fry Jr. | J | PA-7 | March 4, 1827 | |
| 178 | Levin Gale | J | MD-6 | March 4, 1827 | Only term while serving in the House. |
| 179 | Nathaniel Garrow | J | NY-24 | March 4, 1827 | Only term while serving in the House. |
| 180 | Innis Green | J | PA-6 | March 4, 1827 | |
| 181 | Selah R. Hobbie | J | NY-11 | March 4, 1827 | Only term while serving in the House. |
| 182 | James L. Hodges | A | MA-12 | March 4, 1827 | Elected to this Congress: May 14, 1827 |
| 183 | Jonathan Hunt | A | VT-1 | March 4, 1827 | |
| 184 | Richard Keese | J | NY-19 | March 4, 1827 | Only term while serving in the House. |
| 185 | Adam King | J | PA-10 | March 4, 1827 | |
| 186 | Pryor Lea | J | TN-2 | March 4, 1827 | Elected to this Congress: August 2–3, 1827 |
| 187 | Isaac Leffler | A | VA-18 | March 4, 1827 | Elected to this Congress: April 9–30, 1827. Only term while serving in the House. |
| 188 | Chittenden Lyon | J | KY-12 | March 4, 1827 | Elected to this Congress: August 6, 1827 |
| 189 | John Magee | J | NY-28 | March 4, 1827 | |
| 190 | William D. Martin | J | SC-4 | March 4, 1827 | |
| 191 | Lewis Maxwell | A | VA-21 | March 4, 1827 | Elected to this Congress: April 9–30, 1827 |
| 192 | John Maynard | A | NY-26 | March 4, 1827 | Only term while serving in the House until 27th Congress |
| 193 | William T. Nuckolls | J | SC-7 | March 4, 1827 | |
| 194 | Isaac Pierson | A | NJ-al | March 4, 1827 | |
| 195 | David Plant | A | CT-al | March 4, 1827 | Elected to this Congress: April 12, 1827. Only term while serving in the House. |
| 196 | William Ramsey | J | PA-11 | March 4, 1827 | |
| 197 | Joseph Richardson | A | MA-11 | March 4, 1827 | |
| 198 | William Russell | J | OH-5 | March 4, 1827 | |
| 199 | Augustine H. Shepperd | J | NC-9 | March 4, 1827 | Elected to this Congress: August 9, 1827 |
| 200 | Oliver H. Smith | J | IN-3 | March 4, 1827 | Only term while serving in the House. |
| 201 | Michael C. Sprigg | J | MD-4 | March 4, 1827 | Chairman: Expenditures on Public Buildings |
| 202 | John B. Sterigere | J | PA-5 | March 4, 1827 | |
| 203 | John G. Stower | J | NY-22 | March 4, 1827 | Only term while serving in the House. |
| 204 | Joel B. Sutherland | J | PA-1 | March 4, 1827 | |
| 205 | Benjamin Swift | A | VT-4 | March 4, 1827 | |
| 206 | Hedge Thompson | A | NJ-al | March 4, 1827 | Died while still serving in the House: July 23, 1828 |
| 207 | Daniel Turner | J | NC-6 | March 4, 1827 | Elected to this Congress: August 9, 1827. Only term while serving in the House. |
| 208 | George C. Washington | A | MD-3 | March 4, 1827 | |
| 209 | Ephraim K. Wilson | A | MD-8 | March 4, 1827 | |
| 210 | Joseph F. Wingate | A | ME-3 | March 4, 1827 | |
| 212 | John J. Wood | J | NY-2 | March 4, 1827 | Only term while still serving in the House. |
| 212 | Silas Wright Jr. | J | NY-20 | March 4, 1827 | Resigned while still serving in the House: February 16, 1829. Declined to qualify for seat in 21st Congress, after election contest. |
| 213 | Joel Yancey | J | KY-10 | March 4, 1827 | Elected to this Congress: August 6, 1827 |
Members joining the House, after the start of the Congress
| ... | Benjamin Gorham | A | MA-1 | July 23, 1827 | Previously served (DR) November 6, 1820–23. Special election. |
| ... | Rufus McIntire | J | ME-1 | September 10, 1827 | Special election: September 27, 1827 |
| ... | George R. Gilmer | J | GA-1 | October 1, 1827 | Previously served (DR) 1821–23. Special election. Elected to 21st Congress, but did not accept. |
| ... | Kensey Johns Jr. | A | DE-al | October 2, 1827 | Special election |
| ... | William Stanbery | J | OH-8 | October 9, 1827 | Special election |
| ... | John Calhoon | A | KY-11 | November 5, 1827 | Special election. Resigned, as Representative-elect: November 7, 1827. Only term until 24th Congress. |
| ... | Phineas L. Tracy | A | NY-29 | November 5, 1827 | Special election: November 5–7, 1827 |
| ... | Richard H. Wilde | J | GA-2 | November 17, 1827 | Previously served (DR) 1815-17 and (C-DR) February 7–3 March 1825 while in the House. Special election. |
| ... | Thomas Chilton | J | KY-11 | December 22, 1827 | Special election: December 20, 1827 |
| ... | Thomas Hinds | J | MS-al | October 21, 1828 | Special election: October 20–21, 1828 |
| ... | Thomas Taber II | J | NY-5 | November 5, 1828 | Special election: November 3–5, 1828. Only term while serving in the House. |
| ... | John Chambers | A | KY-2 | December 1, 1828 | Special election: August 4, 1828. Only term while serving in the House until 24th Congress |
| ... | James F. Randolph | A | NJ-al | December 1, 1828 | Special election: November 3–4, 1828 |
| ... | Thomas Sinnickson | A | NJ-al | December 1, 1828 | Special election: November 3–4, 1828. Only term while serving in the House. |
| ... | Francis S. Muhlenberg | A | OH-6 | December 19, 1828 | Special election: December 2, 1828. Only term while serving in the House. |
Non voting members
| a | Henry W. Conway | - | AR-al | March 4, 1823 | Delegate from Arkansas Territory. Died, as Delegate-elect: November 9, 1827. |
| b | Joseph M. White | - | FL-al | March 4, 1825 | Delegate from Florida Territory |
| c | Austin E. Wing | - | MI-al | March 4, 1825 | Delegate from Michigan Territory. Last term until 22nd Congress. |
| d | Ambrose H. Sevier | - | AR-al | February 13, 1828 | Delegate from Arkansas Territory. Special election. |

== See also ==
- 20th United States Congress
- List of United States congressional districts
- List of United States senators in the 20th Congress
