= 1827 Kentucky's 11th congressional district special elections =

Two special elections were held in Kentucky's 11th congressional district in 1827 to fill a single vacancy.

== Background ==
In the 1827 elections, William S. Young (A) was re-elected to a 2nd term, but died on September 20, 1827 before Congress assembled. A special election was called to fill the resultant vacancy, held on November 5, 1827

== November election ==
Candidate	Party	Votes	Percent
John Calhoon	Anti-Jacksonian	2,290	57.6%
Thomas Chilton	Jacksonian	1,685	42.4%

The vote of one county had been thrown out, giving the election to Calhoon. By mutual agreement of both candidates, Calhoon subsequently resigned, and both Calhoon and Chilton petitioned the Governor to call a new election, which was held on December 20, 1827.

== December election ==
Candidate	Party	Votes	Percent
Thomas Chilton	Jacksonian	3,146	50.7%
John Calhoon	Anti-Jacksonian	3,063	49.3%

Chilton took his seat on January 11, 1828

== See also ==
- List of special elections to the United States House of Representatives
