= Vincent Boreing =

American politician

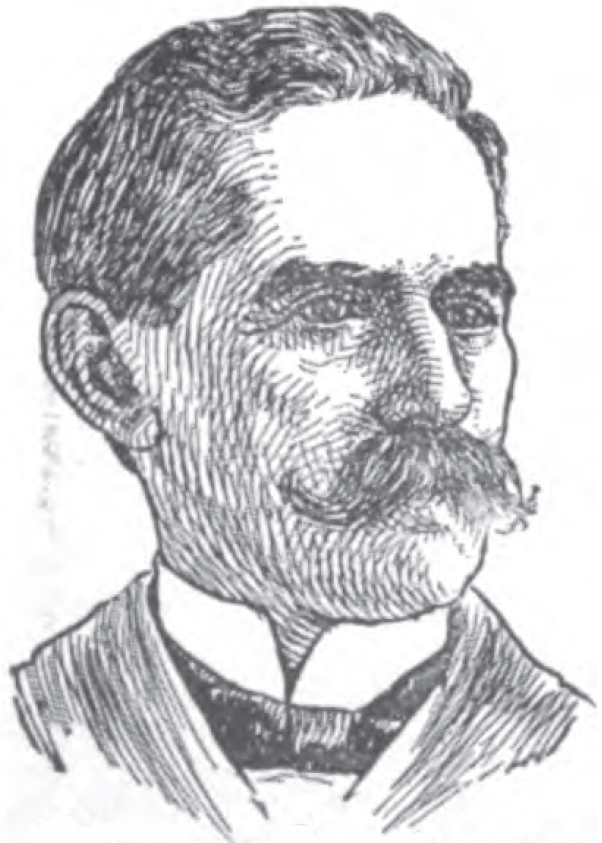

Member of the U.S. House of Representatives from Kentucky's 11th district
- In office March 4, 1899 – September 16, 1903
- Preceded by: David Grant Colson
- Succeeded by: W. Godfrey Hunter

Personal details
- Born: November 24, 1839 Washington County, Tennessee
- Died: September 16, 1903 (aged 63) London, Kentucky
- Resting place: Pine Grove Cemetery
- Party: Republican
- Education: Tusculum College
- Profession: Publisher, businessman
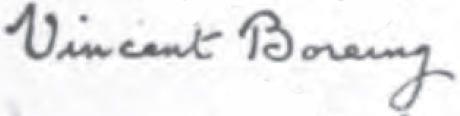
- Signature

Military service
- Allegiance: (United States) Union
- Branch/service: (United States) Union Army
- Years of service: 1861–1865
- Rank: First lieutenant
- Unit: Company A, 24th Regiment Kentucky Volunteer Infantry
- Battles/wars: American Civil War

Vincent Boreing (November 24, 1839 – September 16, 1903) was a U.S. representative from Kentucky.

== Biography ==
Boreing was born near Jonesboro, Washington County, Tennessee in 1839. He moved with his father to Laurel County, Kentucky, in 1847. He attended Laurel Seminary, London, Kentucky, and Tusculum College, Greenville, Tennessee, and was enlisted as a private in the Union Army in Company A, 24th Regiment Kentucky Volunteer Infantry on November 1, 1861. Boreing was commissioned as the first lieutenant for meritorious conduct.

=== Early careers ===
In 1868 through 1872, Boreing served as the county superintendent of public schools. Later in 1875, he established the Mountain Echo in London, the first Republican newspaper published in southeastern Kentucky.

Boreing served in various positions in the 1880s. He served as a county judge in 1886, president of the Cumberland Valley Land Co. in 1887, president of the First National Bank of London in 1888, and as a department commander of the Grand Army of the Republic in Kentucky in 1889.

=== U.S. Representative career ===
Boreing was elected as a Republican to the Fifty-sixth, Fifty-seventh, and Fifty-eighth Congresses, serving from March 4, 1899, until his death in London on September 16, 1903. He was buried at the Pine Grove Cemetery.

== Legacy ==
Vincent Boreing is the namesake of the community of Boreing, Kentucky.

== See also ==
- List of members of the United States Congress who died in office (1900–1949)

U.S. House of Representatives
Preceded by David G. Colson	Member of the U.S. House of Representatives from Kentucky's 11th congressional district 1899 – 1903 (obsolete district)	Succeeded by W. Godfrey Hunter
