= Caleb Powers =

American politician (1869–1932)

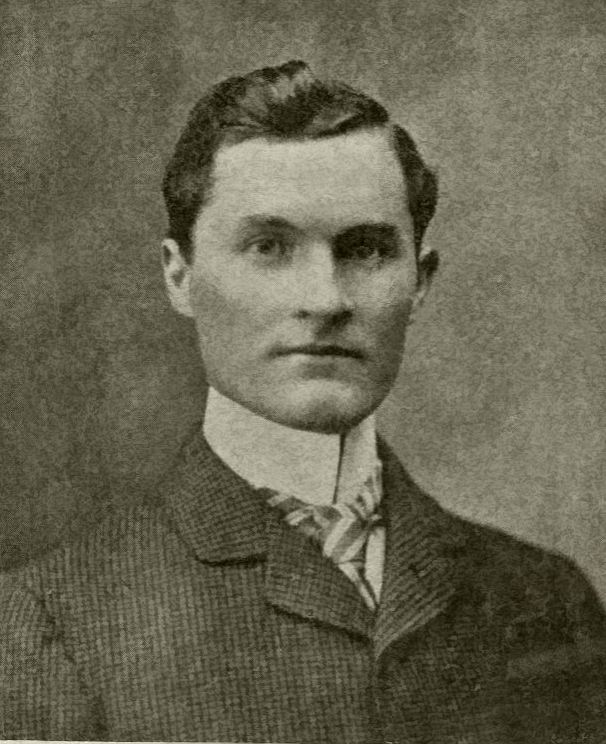
- Powers, c. 1903

Member of the U.S. House of Representatives from Kentucky's 11th district
- In office March 4, 1911 – March 3, 1919
- Preceded by: Don C. Edwards
- Succeeded by: John M. Robsion

55th Secretary of State of Kentucky
- In office December 12, 1899 – January 31, 1900
- Governor: William S. Taylor
- Preceded by: Charles Finley
- Succeeded by: Caleb Breckinridge Hill

Personal details
- Born: February 1, 1869 Whitley County, Kentucky, U.S.
- Died: July 25, 1932 (aged 63) Baltimore, Maryland, U.S.
- Party: Republican
- Spouse(s): Laura Rawlings (m. 1896; died 1896) Dorothy
- Children: 1
- Education: Valparaiso University
- Profession: Lawyer

Caleb Powers (February 1, 1869 – July 25, 1932) was an American attorney and politician who served as the U.S. representative for Kentucky's 11th congressional district from 1911 to 1919. He briefly served as the 55th Secretary of State of Kentucky, but was unseated following the assassination of Governor William Goebel, which he was accused of orchestrating.

== Early life ==
He was born near Williamsburg, Kentucky. He attended the public schools, Union College in Barbourville, Kentucky, the University of Kentucky at Lexington, Kentucky and Centre College in Danville, Kentucky. He graduated from the Northern Indiana Normal School and Business Institute (now known as Valparaiso University) in Valparaiso, Indiana and attended the United States Military Academy at West Point in 1890 and 1891. He was discharged due to having weak eyes which led to temporary blindness.

Powers studied law and was admitted to the bar in 1894 and commenced practice at Barbourville, Kentucky. He was the superintendent of public schools for Knox County, Kentucky 1894–1899. He was elected secretary of state of Kentucky in 1899 but was unseated after a contest.

== Assassination of William Goebel ==
Powers was convicted of complicity in the assassination of Governor William Goebel in 1900 who had just won the election. Goebel was walking to work at the Capitol between two body guards, when assassins opened fire and killed him. The prosecution charged that Powers was the mastermind of having a political opponent killed so that his boss, Governor William S. Taylor, could stay in office. Among his attorneys were R. C. O. Benjamin and Frank S. Black. Powers was found guilty and sentenced to life in prison. But an appeals court overturned Powers' conviction, though Powers was tried three more times, resulting in three convictions and a hung jury. Governor Augustus E. Willson pardoned Powers in 1908 after eight years in prison. While in prison, Powers authored the 1905 book My Own Story.

== Congress and later life ==
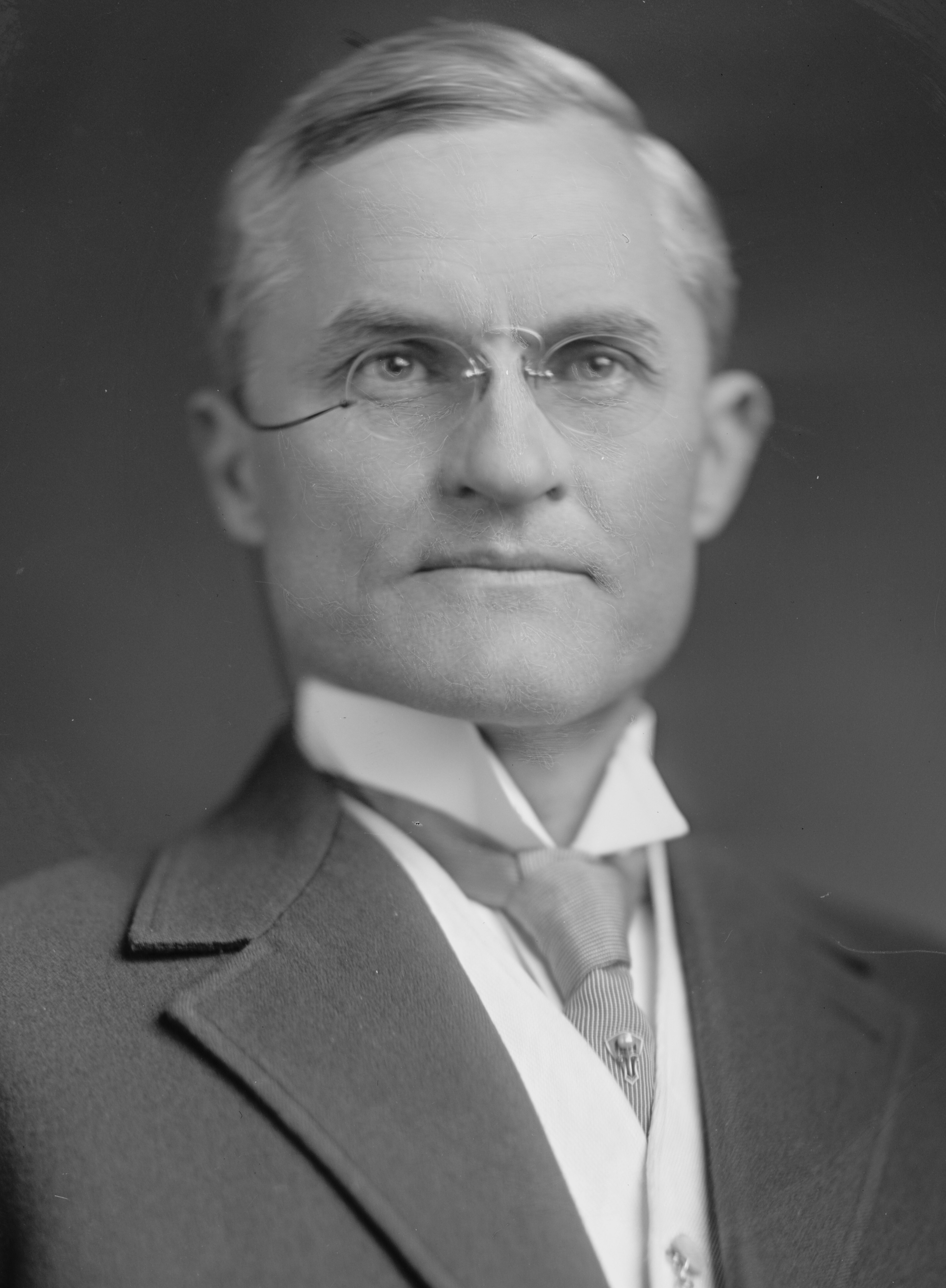
Powers' congressional portrait, c. 1911–1919

After leaving prison, Powers was elected as a Republican to the 62nd and to the three succeeding Congresses (March 4, 1911 – March 3, 1919) but was not a candidate for renomination in 1918. He served as a delegate to the Republican National Convention in 1912 and moved to Washington, D.C., and served as assistant counsel for the United States Shipping Board from 1921 until his death in Baltimore, Maryland, in 1932. He was buried in City Cemetery, Barbourville, Kentucky.

Caleb Powers married Laura Rawlings in January 1896 and she died six months later. He was survived by his second wife, Dorothy. He had one daughter, named Elsie.

== See also ==
- List of wrongful convictions in the United States

Political offices
Preceded by Charles Finley	Secretary of State of Kentucky; 1899–1900	Succeeded by Caleb B. Hill
U.S. House of Representatives
Preceded by Don C. Edwards	Member of the U.S. House of Representatives from Kentucky's 11th congressional district 1911 – 1919 (obsolete district)	Succeeded by John M. Robsion
