= Richard Menefee =

American politician (1809–1841)

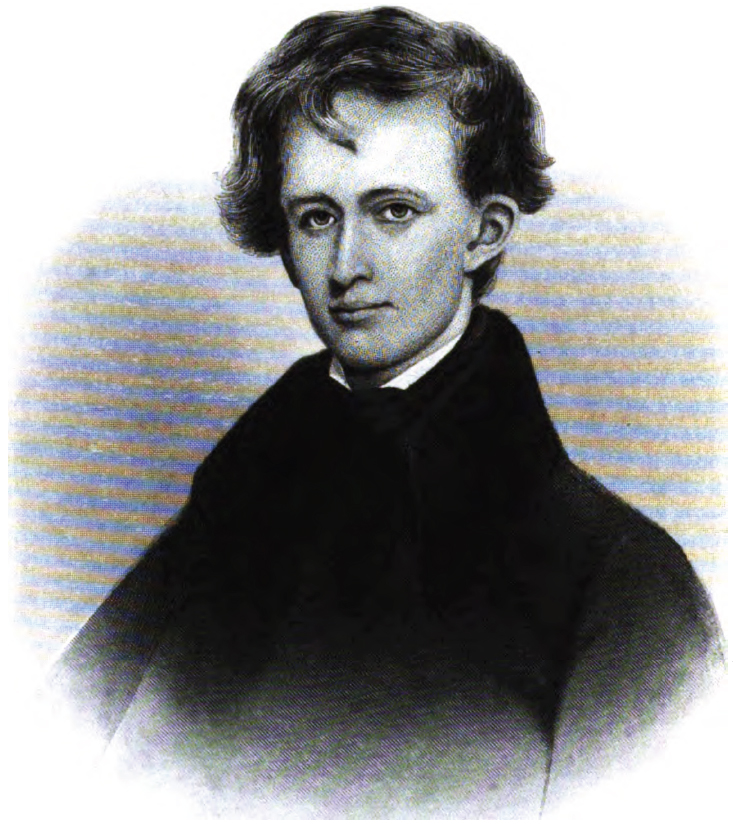

Member of the U.S. House of Representatives from Kentucky's 11th district
- In office March 4, 1837 – March 3, 1839
- Preceded by: Richard French
- Succeeded by: Landaff Andrews

Personal details
- Born: December 4, 1809 Owingsville, Kentucky, U.S.
- Died: February 21, 1841 (aged 31) Frankfort, Kentucky, U.S.
- Resting place: Cave Hill Cemetery; Louisville, Kentucky, U.S.
- Party: Whig
- Spouse: Sarah Bell Jouett (m. 1832)
- Children: 3
- Education: Transylvania University
- Occupation: Tavern keeper, teacher
- Profession: Lawyer
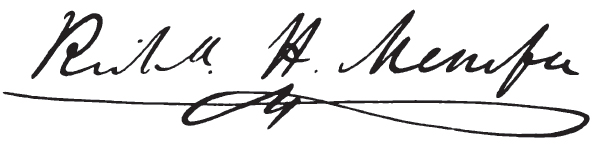
- Signature

Richard Hickman Menefee (December 4, 1809 – February 21, 1841) was a U.S. representative from Kentucky. Due to his oratory skill, he was dubbed "the young Patrick Henry of the West." He was presumed the successor to Henry Clay as leader of the Whig Party until his death at age thirty-one.

Menefee received a meager education in his early life. A dispute with his stepfather caused him to leave home in his mid-teens. He worked as a teacher to support himself and pay to finish his education. He graduated from Transylvania University and studied law. In 1831, he was appointed Commonwealth's Attorney for Kentucky's eleventh district and was elected to the Kentucky House of Representatives the following year.

In 1836, Menefee was elected to the House of Representatives. His best known speech in that body urged restraint in the Caroline affair with the British. His reputation, and that of fellow Kentuckian John J. Crittenden, were tarnished due to their involvement in a duel between Representatives William J. Graves and Jonathan Cilley, in which the latter was mortally wounded. He did not stand for re-election following his term in office and returned to his legal practice. In 1841, he was elected to the U.S. Senate, but died five days later before he could take office. Menifee County, Kentucky, despite the spelling discrepancy, is named in his honor.

== Early life ==
Richard Hickman Menefee was born on December 4, 1809, in Owingsville, Kentucky. He was the third of five sons born to Richard and Mary (Longsdale) Menefee. His father was an Irish potter who immigrated to Kentucky from Virginia in the 1790s and became one of the founders of the city of Owingsville. Despite a limited education, the elder Richard Menefee was elected to multiple terms in the Kentucky House of Representatives and one term in the Kentucky Senate.

It was while the elder Richard Menefee was in Frankfort for a session of the General Assembly that his son Richard was born. When asked to name the child at his baptism, his mother christened him Henry Clay Menefee, after Kentucky statesman Henry Clay. When his father returned from his legislative duties, he changed the child's name to Richard Hickman Menefee in honor of his Senate colleague, Richard Hickman.

Menefee's father died in 1815. Four years later, his mother married Colonel George Lansdown, proprietor of a spa in Bath County. Until the age of twelve, Menefee was educated by his mother. He then enrolled at Walker Bourne's preparatory school in Bath County, where he was a classmate of future congressmen Henry S. Lane and John Jameson. Two years later, family troubles forced him to withdraw from school and help support the family. He began work at a tavern in Owingsville and engaged in farm work during the summer months. He continued his studies as time allowed and became a teacher at age fifteen. A short time later, he left home due to a dispute with his stepfather. He relocated to Mount Sterling, Kentucky, and paid his way through school.

At age eighteen, Menefee entered Transylvania University in the junior class. Though the college's rules forbade conveying degrees upon underage candidates, Menefee was granted an exception by President Horace Holley and graduated with his class. Following his graduation, he read law with Judge James Trimble. He returned to Mount Sterling, where he was admitted to the bar in 1830 and opened a law practice in 1831. In October 1831, he enrolled at Transylvania University law school and on March 3, 1832, earned a law degree. Notable in Menefee's graduating class was George W. Johnson, who would later serve as governor of Kentucky's provisional Confederate government during the Civil War.

On August 14, 1832, Menefee married Sarah Bell Jouett, daughter of famed Kentucky painter Matthew Harris Jouett. The couple had three children: Alexander (who died as an infant), Richard, and Mary.

== Political career ==
On November 15, 1831, Governor Thomas Metcalfe appointed Menefee to succeed his law tutor, James Trimble, as Commonwealth's Attorney for the 11th district. He held this office until 1836, when he resigned to seek election to the Kentucky House of Representatives. In the midst of the campaign, Governor James Turner Morehead called for one thousand mounted soldiers for service in the Second Seminole War. A company was raised in Montgomery County, and they chose Menefee as their captain, but the requisite thousand men reached Governor Morehead before Menefee's company; consequently, Menefee's men were turned away. Menefee returned to the campaign trail, and he was elected as a Whig to represent Montgomery County in the Kentucky House of Representatives.

Menefee was appointed to the House Ways and Means Committee. The first bill he offered to the House authorized the construction of the first turnpike in Bath County and gave control of the turnpike to the Owingsville and Big Sandy Road Company; this bill passed and was signed into law by Governor James Clark on February 16, 1832. His most notable action in the House was arguing against the repeal of an 1833 law that prohibited the importation of slaves. Fellow representative Thomas F. Marshall called Menefee's speech on this occasion "the master effort of his mind that winter."

In April 1837, Menefee announced that he would challenge incumbent Democrat Richard French for his seat in the U.S. House of Representatives. Menefee defeated French by a margin of 234 votes and was the youngest member of the Twenty-fifth Congress. Youth's History of Kentucky, an 1898 school textbook, records that some referred to Menefee as "the young Patrick Henry of the West" due to his considerable oratory skill. He was appointed to the Committee on Expenditures of the Public Buildings and the Committee on Patents. He opposed several measures favored by President Martin van Buren, including a bill to cease distributing the federal budget surplus to the states and a bill authorizing the printing of an additional $10 million (~$330 million in 2025) in currency. Both measures passed over his objections.

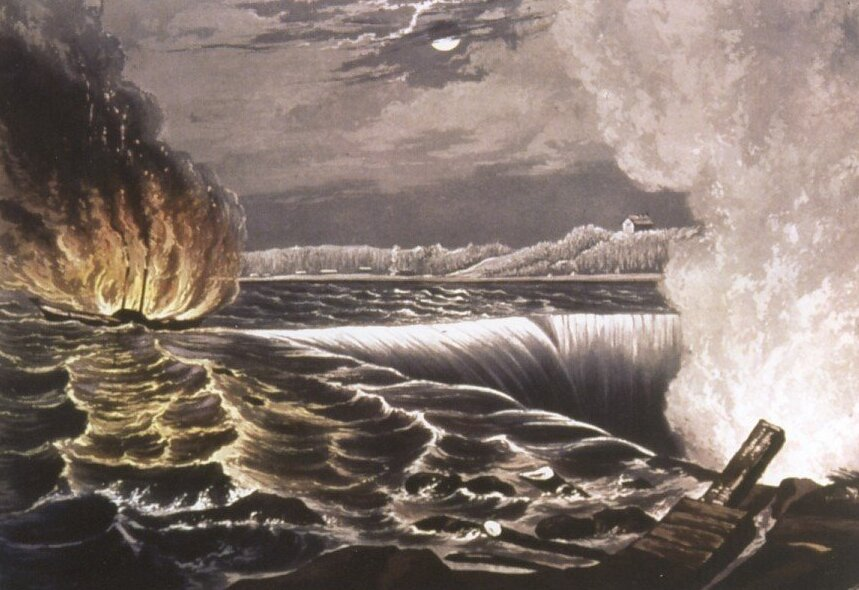
The Destruction of the Caroline by George Tattersall

In 1837, rebels seeking a more democratic Canada fled to Navy Island in the Niagara River. The rebels, led by William Lyon Mackenzie, found sympathy with Americans across the river in New York. These Americans carried supplies to the rebels aboard the steamship Caroline. In retaliation, an Anglo-Canadian crossed the river, loosed the Caroline and set her on fire, then put her in the river's current, sending her over Niagara Falls. The Caroline affair provoked anger and anti-British sentiment in the United States. It was upon this subject that Menefee made his most notable speech in the House. He urged restraint in responding to the British and proclaimed that he saw no great principles involved in the affair.^{[a]}

On February 1, 1838, a dispute arose surrounding the election of Seargent Smith Prentiss and Thomas J. Word – both of Mississippi – to the House of Representatives. Menefee contested the claims of Virginia's James M. Mason and South Carolina's Hugh S. Legare that the Mississippians had not been properly elected. Both were eventually allowed to retain their seats.

In 1838, Menefee and John J. Crittenden served as seconds for fellow Kentucky representative William J. Graves in a duel in which Graves killed Maine representative Jonathan Cilley. The House censured Graves over the incident, and the reputations of both Crittenden and Menefee were tarnished by their involvement. Shortly thereafter, the House passed anti-dueling legislation. Menefee's longest speech in the House was with regard to this law, and was delivered in three parts on April 23, 28, and 30, 1838. Menefee voluntarily retired from public life after serving only a single term in the House.

== Later life and death ==
Menefee returned to Kentucky, settling in Lexington, where he resumed his law practice. He had a 20-acre farm in a spot that was described in 1920 as "beyond the passenger depot of the Southern Railway." On a return trip to Owingsville, he successfully defended a man accused of murder in a dispute over rights to an ore bed. His opponent in the case was his old colleague from the House, Thomas F. Marshall. Menefee's biographer, John Townsend, called the case "the second greatest law case in which [Menefee] was ever engaged."

The greatest, according to Townsend, was the 1840 case involving the will of a man named James Rogers. In the will, Rogers expressed that he had already provided assets from his estate amounting to five thousand dollars to the children of his first marriage and that upon his death, his estate was to be divided among his second wife and her children. A team of Menefee, future governor James F. Robinson, and Madison C. Johnson represented the five children from the first marriage, who filed suit to set aside the will on the grounds that their father had suffered a stroke and was not of sound mind when constructing the will. They argued opposite Henry Clay and Robert C. Wickliffe. The case lasted six days, and the decision in the case went against Menefee and Robinson.

Menefee's health was already beginning to fail during the trial with Clay, and he last appeared in court in September 1840. In 1841, Cassius M. Clay nominated Menefee to fill the U.S. Senate seat vacated by the resignation of John J. Crittenden. He was elected, but died five days later. He was commonly reported to have died of tuberculosis, but Townsend claims the true cause of death was "consumption of the bowels." He was interred in a private cemetery in Fayette County. On October 28, 1893, he was re-interred in Cave Hill Cemetery in Louisville, Kentucky.

The Transylvania Law Society asked Menefee's colleague, Thomas F. Marshall, to deliver a speech on Menefee's life and character at Marshall's convenience. Marshall spent seven weeks preparing the eulogy. Afterward, the Society asked Marshall for the text of the speech, and it was published as a pamphlet. Kentucky historian Lewis Collins opined that, had he lived, Menefee would have succeeded Henry Clay as the leader of the Whig Party. Menifee County, Kentucky, is named in Menefee's honor, despite the unintentional misspelling of the name.

== Notes ==
^[a]A transcript of this speech can be found in Townsend's biography of Menefee on pages 113–128.

U.S. House of Representatives
Preceded by Richard French	Member of the U.S. House of Representatives from Kentucky's 11th congressional district 1837–1839 (obsolete district)	Succeeded by Landaff Andrews
