= W. Godfrey Hunter =

American politician (1841–1917)

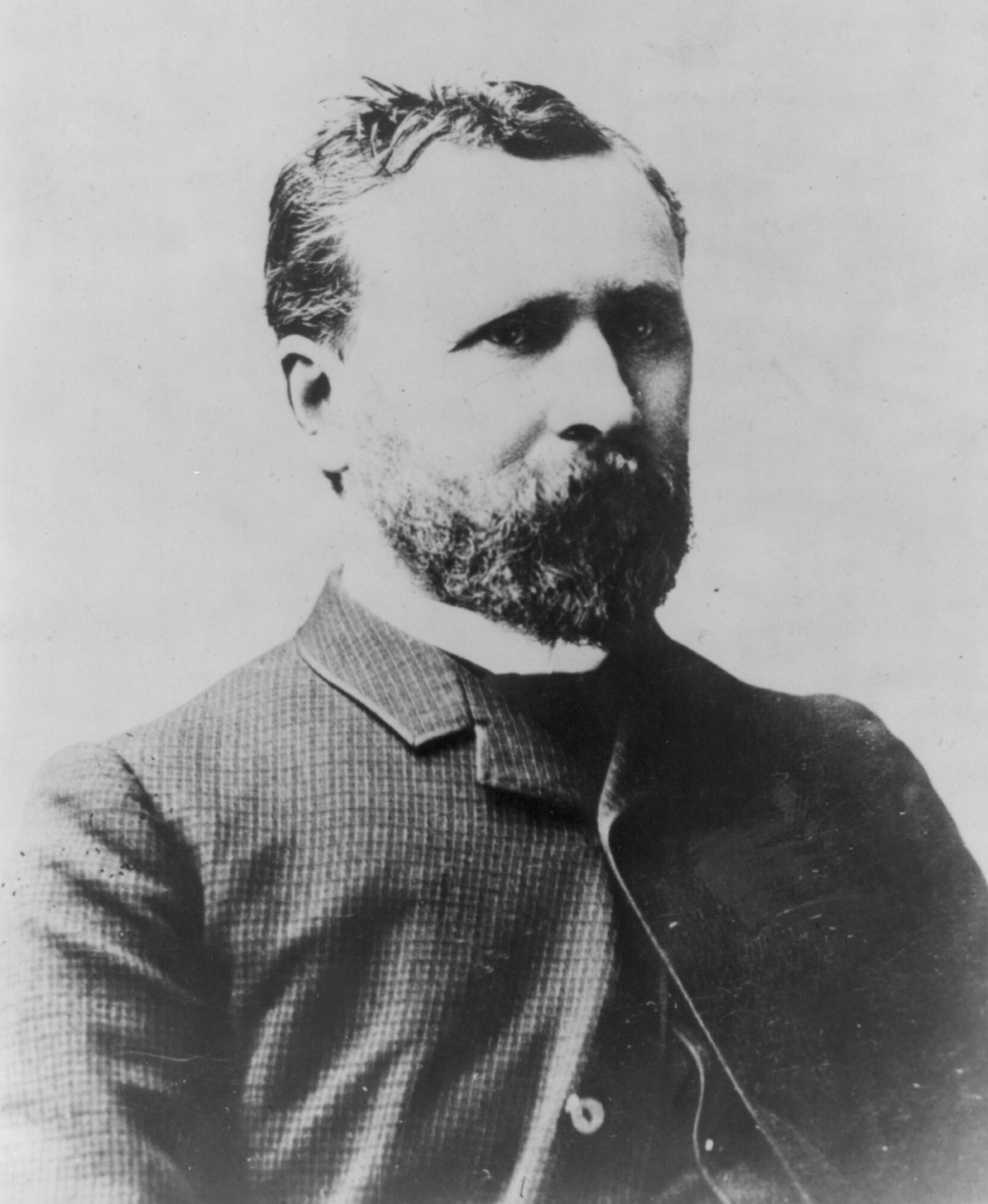
- Hunter, c. 1887

Member of the U.S. House of Representatives from Kentucky's 11th district
- In office November 10, 1903 – March 3, 1905
- Preceded by: Vincent S. Boreing
- Succeeded by: Don C. Edwards

United States Ambassador to Honduras
- In office January 19, 1899 – 1903
- Preceded by: Macgrane Coxe
- Succeeded by: Macgrane Coxe

United States Ambassador to Guatemala
- In office January 25, 1898 – February 2, 1903
- Preceded by: Macgrane Coxe
- Succeeded by: Macgrane Coxe

Member of the U.S. House of Representatives from Kentucky's 3rd district
- In office March 4, 1895 – March 3, 1897
- Preceded by: Isaac Goodnight
- Succeeded by: John Stockdale Rhea
- In office March 4, 1887 – March 3, 1889
- Preceded by: John Edward Halsell
- Succeeded by: Isaac Goodnight

Personal details
- Born: December 25, 1841 near Belfast, Ireland
- Died: November 2, 1917 (aged 75) Louisville, Kentucky, U.S.

Military service
- Allegiance: United States
- Branch/service: Union army
- Battles/wars: American Civil War

Whiteside Godfrey Hunter (December 25, 1841 – November 2, 1917) was a U.S. representative from Kentucky.

== Early life ==
Born near Belfast, Ireland, Hunter completed preparatory studies. He immigrated to the United States in 1858 and settled in New Castle, Pennsylvania. He studied medicine in Philadelphia and was admitted to practice.

== Career ==
Hunter was a surgeon in the Union Army during the Civil War. He moved to Burkesville, Kentucky, at the close of the war. He served as member of the Kentucky House of Representatives from 1874 to 1878. He served as delegate to the 1880 and 1892 Republican National Conventions. He served as the United States Minister to Guatemala and Honduras from November 8, 1897, to December 8, 1902.

Hunter was elected as a Republican to the Fiftieth Congress (March 4, 1887 – March 3, 1889). He was an unsuccessful candidate for reelection in 1888 to the Fifty-first Congress and for election in 1892 to the Fifty-third Congress.

Hunter was elected to the Fifty-fourth Congress (March 4, 1895 – March 3, 1897) and was instrumental in the election of Kentucky's first Republican governor, William O'Connell Bradley, in 1895. His bid for election to the U.S. Senate by the legislature was blocked by Republican factionalism. The winner of the election, William J. DeBoe, got President William McKinley to appoint Hunter as minister to Guatemala and Honduras in 1897 after Hunter was defeated for reelection in 1896 to the Fifty-fifth Congress.

Hunter was elected to the Fifty-eighth Congress to fill the vacancy caused by the death of Vincent S. Boreing and served from November 10, 1903, to March 3, 1905. He was not a candidate for renomination in 1904. He was interested in public utilities and the development of oil lands.

== Personal life ==
Hunter resided in Louisville, Kentucky, until his death there on November 2, 1917. He was interred in Cave Hill Cemetery in Louisville.

U.S. House of Representatives
Preceded by John Edward Halsell	Member of the U.S. House of Representatives from Kentucky's 3rd congressional district March 4, 1887–March 3, 1889	Succeeded by Isaac Goodnight
Preceded by Isaac Goodnight	Member of the U.S. House of Representatives from Kentucky's 3rd congressional district March 4, 1895–March 3, 1897	Succeeded by John Stockdale Rhea
Preceded by Vincent S. Boreing	Member of the U.S. House of Representatives from Kentucky's 11th congressional district November 10, 1903–March 3, 1905 (obsolete district)	Succeeded by Don C. Edwards
Diplomatic posts
Preceded by Macgrane Coxe	United States Minister to Guatemala; January 25, 1898–February 2, 1903	Succeeded by Leslie Combs
Preceded by Macgrane Coxe	United States Minister to Honduras; January 19, 1899–February 2, 1903	Succeeded by Leslie Combs
