= Landaff Andrews =

American politician

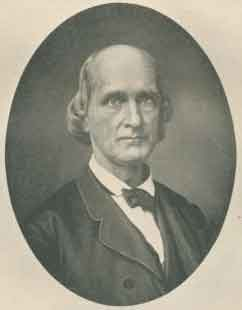

Member of the U.S. House of Representatives from Kentucky's 11th district
- In office March 4, 1839 – March 3, 1843
- Preceded by: Richard Menefee
- Succeeded by: District abolished

Member of the Kentucky Senate from the 35th district
- In office August 3, 1857 – August 5, 1861
- Preceded by: John A. Cavan
- Succeeded by: Walter Chiles

Member of the Kentucky House of Representatives from Fleming County
- In office August 5, 1861 – April 1862
- Preceded by: Harrison G. Burns; Henry B. Dobyns
- Succeeded by: William S. Botts
- In office August 1, 1836 – August 5, 1839 Serving with Robert G. Lewis (1836–37); Abram Gooding (1837–38); William W. Blair (1838–39)
- Preceded by: William W. Blair; Robert G. Lewis
- Succeeded by: John H. Botts; Henry D. Burgess
- In office August 4, 1834 – August 3, 1835 Serving with William W. Blair
- Preceded by: John Heddleston; Dorsey K. Stockton
- Succeeded by: William W. Blair; Robert G. Lewis

Personal details
- Born: February 12, 1803 Fleming County, Kentucky, US
- Died: December 23, 1888 (aged 85) Flemingsburg, Kentucky, US
- Resting place: Fleming County Cemetery
- Party: Whig (until 1854)
- Other political affiliations: Know Nothing (1857); Opposition (1859); Unionist (1861)
- Education: Transylvania University
- Profession: Lawyer

Landaff Watson Andrews (February 12, 1803 – December 23, 1888) was a United States representative from Kentucky.

== Biography ==
Born in Flemingsburg, Kentucky, Andrews graduated from the law department of Transylvania University, Lexington, Kentucky, in 1826 and was admitted to the bar the same year. Andrews commenced practice in Flemingsburg, Kentucky. He was also a slave owner.

Andrews was the prosecuting attorney of Fleming County, Kentucky, 1829–1839, and a member of the Kentucky House of Representatives, 1834–1838. He was elected as a Whig to the Twenty-sixth and Twenty-seventh Congresses (March 4, 1839 – March 3, 1843) but was an unsuccessful candidate for reelection in 1842 to the Twenty-eighth Congress. After leaving Congress, he served in the Kentucky Senate as an Know Nothing candidate in 1857 and was again elected a member of the Kentucky House of Representatives, in 1861, and served until 1862, when he resigned.

After leaving the state legislature, Andrews was the judge of the circuit court, 1862–1868. He resumed the practice of law in Flemingsburg, Kentucky where he died in 1888. His year of death is often given erroneously as 1887. He was buried in Fleming County Cemetery.

U.S. House of Representatives
Preceded by Richard Menefee	Member of the U.S. House of Representatives from Kentucky's 11th congressional district 1839 – 1843 (obsolete district)	Succeeded by District inactive
