= Charles Finley (politician) =

American politician (1865–1941)

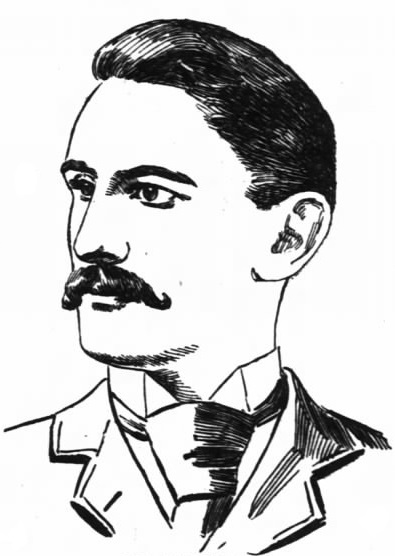
- Louisville Courier-Journal, March 10, 1900.

Member of the U.S. House of Representatives from Kentucky's 11th district
- In office February 15, 1930 – March 3, 1933
- Preceded by: John M. Robsion
- Succeeded by: District eliminated

52nd & 54th Secretary of State of Kentucky
- In office December 12, 1899 – December 29, 1899
- Governor: William S. Taylor
- Preceded by: John W. Headley
- Succeeded by: Caleb Powers
- In office January 1, 1896 – December 10, 1899
- Governor: William O'Connell Bradley
- Preceded by: John W. Headley
- Succeeded by: John W. Headley

Member of the Kentucky House of Representatives from the 69th district
- In office January 1, 1894 – January 1, 1896
- Preceded by: John M. Tinsley (Note: As the representative from Knox and Whitley Counties.)
- Succeeded by: W. R. Black

Personal details
- Born: March 26, 1865 Williamsburg, Kentucky, U.S.
- Died: March 18, 1941 (aged 75) Williamsburg, Kentucky, U.S.
- Resting place: Highland Cemetery; Williamsburg, Kentucky, U.S.
- Party: Republican
- Parent: Hugh Franklin Finley (father)
- Education: Milligan College
- Profession: Coal mine operator; banker; publisher

Charles Finley (March 26, 1865 – March 18, 1941) was a United States representative from Kentucky and son of Hugh Franklin Finley.

== Biography ==
Finley was born in Williamsburg, Kentucky, where he attended the common and subscription schools. Later, he attended Milligan College. He engaged in business as a coal operator, banker, and publisher.

Finley was a member of the Kentucky House of Representatives 1894-1896 and a delegate to the Republican state convention in 1895. He served as Secretary of State of Kentucky from 1896 to 1900.

=== Indicted for murder ===
On January 30, 1900, Democrat William Goebel was shot while the results of the previous year's election for Governor of Kentucky was still being contested; Goebel was declared the winner, and died shortly afterwards. Finley was one of several Republicans suspected of involvement; they were indicted, and arrest warrants were issued. Along with several others, Finley fled to Indiana to escape prosecution. The Republican governor there refused to honor extradition requests, and they continued to reside in Indiana while the case was litigated.

In 1909, Kentucky Governor Augustus E. Willson extended clemency to Finley and other suspects; they never faced trial, and then returned to Kentucky.

=== Other service ===
Finley was chairman of the Republican executive committee of the Eleventh Kentucky Congressional District from 1912 to 1928. He was elected as a Republican to the Seventy-first Congress to fill the vacancy caused by the resignation of John M. Robsion and was reelected to the Seventy-second Congress and served from February 15, 1930, to March 3, 1933. He was not a candidate for renomination in 1932.

After leaving Congress, he retired from business activities before dying in Williamsburg, Kentucky in 1941. He was buried in Highland Cemetery, Williamsburg, Kentucky.

== Sources ==
=== Internet ===
- United States Congress. "Charles Finley (id: F000130)". Biographical Directory of the United States Congress.

=== Newspapers ===
- "Gov. Willson Boldly Issues Sweeping Pardons Before Trial of Alleged Assassins of Gov. Goebel". The Courier-Journal. Louisville, KY. April 24, 1909. p. 1.
- "Goebel Slaying Suspect, Charles Finley, Dies". The Courier-Journal. Louisville, KY. March 20, 1941. p. 15.

Political offices
Preceded by John W. Headley	Secretary of State of Kentucky; 1896–1899	Succeeded by John W. Headley
Preceded by John W. Headley	Secretary of State of Kentucky; 1899	Succeeded by Caleb Powers
U.S. House of Representatives
Preceded by John M. Robsion	Member of the U.S. House of Representatives from Kentucky's 11th congressional district 1930 – 1933 (obsolete district)	Succeeded by District eliminated
