= Andrew Trumbo =

American politician (1797–1871)

Andrew Alkire Trumbo (September 15, 1797 – August 21, 1871) was a United States representative from Kentucky. He was born in Bath County, Kentucky and attended the common schools. He was employed in the county clerk's office. After studying law, he was admitted to the bar and commenced practice in Owingsville, Kentucky in 1824. In 1830, Andrew was the clerk and the Commonwealth attorney for Bath County.

Trumbo was elected as a Whig to the Twenty-ninth Congress (March 4, 1845 – March 3, 1847). After leaving Congress, he was the presidential elector on the Democratic ticket in 1848. He resumed the practice of law and moved to Franklin County, Kentucky. He died in Frankfort, Kentucky in 1871, and was buried in the City Cemetery, Owingsville, Kentucky.

U.S. House of Representatives
Preceded by Richard French	Member of the U.S. House of Representatives from Kentucky's 9th congressional district 1845 – 1847	Succeeded by Richard French
