= Philip Thompson (Kentucky politician) =

American politician (1789–1836)

Member of the U.S. House of Representatives from Kentucky's 11th district
- In office March 4, 1823 – March 3, 1829
- Preceded by: District created
- Succeeded by: William Singleton Young

Member of the Kentucky House of Representatives

Personal details
- Born: August 20, 1789 Mercer County, Kentucky, U.S.
- Died: November 25, 1836 (aged 47) Owensboro, Kentucky, U.S.
- Party: Adams-Clay Republican
- Spouse: Sally Clay Moseley Thompson
- Children: 6

Military service
- Allegiance: United States
- Branch/service: Kentucky Volunteer Militia
- Years of service: 1812
- Rank: Lieutenant
- Unit: 10th Company of Barbour's Regiment

Philip Thompson (August 20, 1789 – November 25, 1836) was a member of the U.S. representative from Kentucky.

Born in Mercer County, near Harrodsburg, Kentucky, Thompson received a limited education. He served as a lieutenant in the War of 1812 with 10th Company of Barbour's Regiment, Kentucky Volunteer Militia.

Thompson held several local offices and practiced law. He was admitted to the bar and commenced practice in Hartford, Ohio County, Kentucky. After moving to Owensboro, Kentucky, he served in the State house of representatives.

Thompson was elected as an Adams-Clay Republican to the Eighteenth Congress (March 4, 1823 – March 3, 1825). Apparently he did not seek re-election in 1824 and resumed the practice of law in Owensboro.

He died in Owensboro on November 25, 1836. Originally interred in the Moseley burying ground on Firth Street, he was reinterred in Rural Hill (later Rosehill Elmwood) Cemetery in 1856.

U.S. House of Representatives
Preceded by District created	Member of the U.S. House of Representatives from Kentucky's 11th congressional district March 4, 1823 – March 3, 1825 (obsolete district)	Succeeded by William S. Young
