= David G. Colson =

American politician (1861–1904)

David Grant Colson
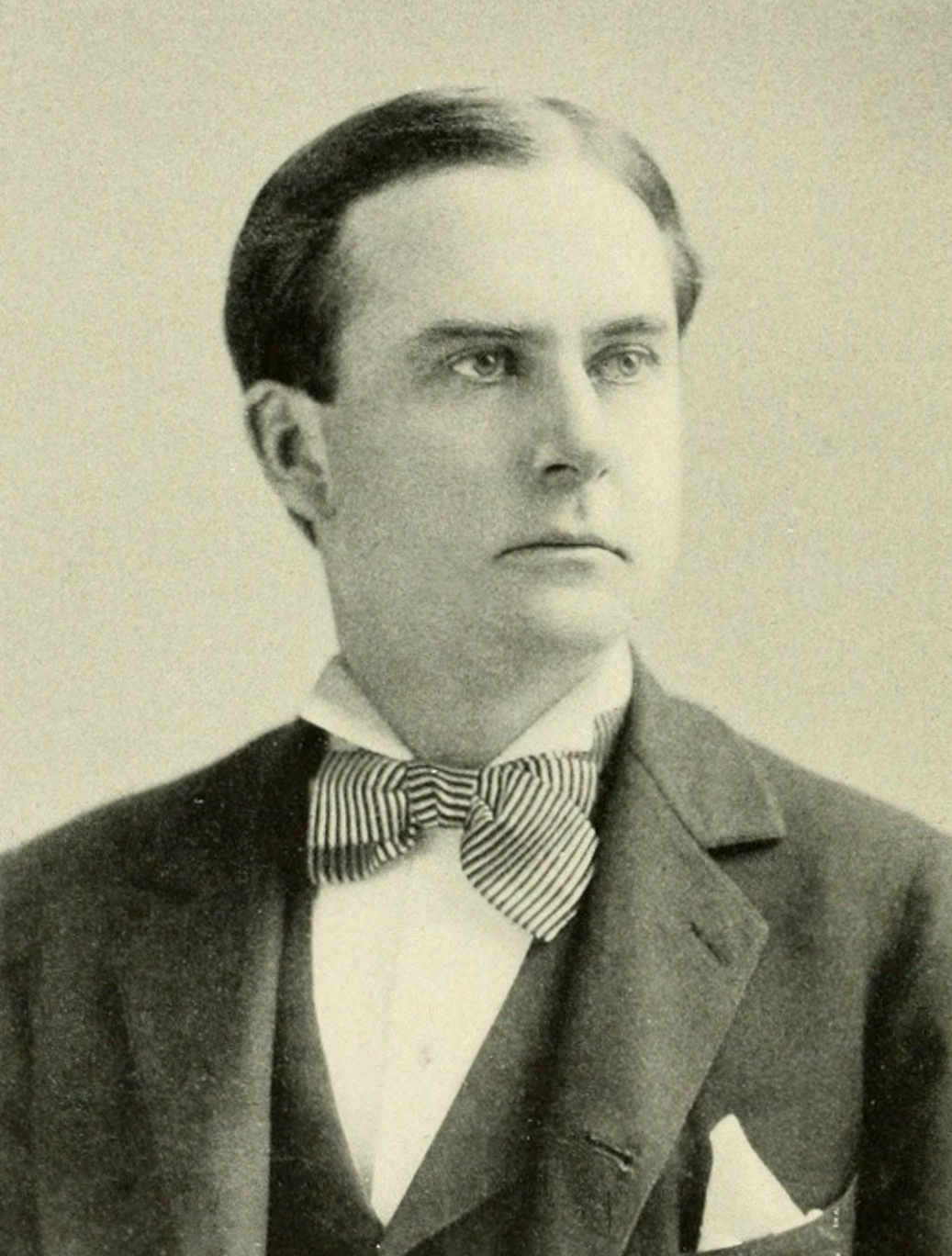
- Colson, c. 1899

Member of the U.S. House of Representatives from Kentucky's 11th district
- In office March 4, 1895 – March 3, 1899
- Preceded by: Silas Adams
- Succeeded by: Vincent Boreing

Member of the Kentucky House of Representatives
- In office August 1, 1887 – August 5, 1889
- Preceded by: Wright Kelly
- Succeeded by: W. P. Bentley
- Constituency: Bell, Harlan, Leslie and Perry Counties

Personal details
- Born: April 1, 1861 Middlesboro, Kentucky
- Died: September 27, 1904 (aged 43) Middlesboro, Kentucky
- Resting place: Colson Cemetery
- Party: Republican
- Education: University of Kentucky
- Profession: Lawyer

Military service
- Allegiance: United States of America
- Branch/service: Kentucky volunteers
- Rank: Colonel
- Battles/wars: Spanish–American War

David Grant Colson (April 1, 1861 – September 27, 1904) was an American politician from the State of Kentucky who served as a U.S. representative from Kentucky's 11th congressional district. He previously served in the Kentucky House of Representatives and as the mayor of Middlesboro.

== Biography ==
Colson was born in Yellow Creek (now Middlesboro, Kentucky), Knox (now Bell) County, Kentucky. He was the seventh of eleven children. Colson attended the common schools and the academies at Tazewell and Mossy Creek, Tennessee.

He studied law at the University of Kentucky at Lexington in 1879 and 1880. He was admitted to the bar and commenced practice in Pineville.

== Political career ==
Colson, a Republican, served as a state representative in 1887 and 1888, representing Bell, Harlan, Perry, and Leslie Counties, and again in 1902. He was the Republican nominee for State Treasurer in 1889. He served as mayor of Middlesboro in 1893–1895.

Colson was elected a US Representative in 1894 and re-elected in 1896, serving in the Fifty-fourth and Fifty-fifth Congresses (March 4, 1895 – March 3, 1899). He served as chairman of the Committee on Expenditures on Public Buildings in the Fifty-fifth Congress. During his second term in Congress, Colson was known as a supporter of President McKinley's administration, but often voted with Democrats on regional issues.

While a Representative, Colson was a member of the "Free Cuba" group. In 1898, during the Spanish–American War, Colson left his position in Congress to become colonel of the Fourth Kentucky Volunteer Infantry. After his military service, he did not run for re-election.

In 1899, Colson was shot in the arm by a fellow officer, Lieutenant Ethelbert Dudley Scott. Colson had previously brought court-martial charges against Scott. On January 16, 1900, Colson got in a pistol fight with Scott in a hotel lobby in Frankfort, Kentucky. Three men were killed: Scott and two bystanders, Charles Julian and Luther Demaree. Colson was acquitted of the charges that April.

Colson died at his farm outside of Middlesboro, Kentucky on September 27, 1904.

He was interred in Colson Cemetery.

U.S. House of Representatives
Preceded by Silas Adams	Member of the U.S. House of Representatives from Kentucky's 11th congressional district 1895 – 1899 (obsolete district)	Succeeded by Vincent Boreing
