= Isaac Goodnight =

American politician

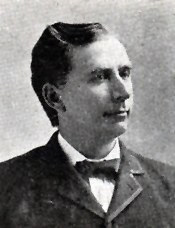
- Goodnight, c. 1893

Member of the U.S. House of Representatives from Kentucky's 3rd district
- In office March 4, 1889 – March 3, 1895
- Preceded by: W. Godfrey Hunter
- Succeeded by: W. Godfrey Hunter

Member of the Kentucky House of Representatives from Simpson County
- In office August 6, 1877 – August 4, 1879
- Preceded by: M. M. Sloss
- Succeeded by: J. E. Neeley

Personal details
- Born: January 31, 1849 Allen County, Kentucky
- Died: July 24, 1901 (aged 52) Franklin, Kentucky
- Resting place: Green Lawn Cemetery
- Party: Democratic
- Spouse: Ella Hoy
- Education: Cumberland University
- Profession: Lawyer

Isaac Herschel Goodnight (January 31, 1849 – July 24, 1901) was a United States representative from Kentucky.

== Early life and family ==
Isaac Goodnight was born near Scottsville, Kentucky on January 31, 1849. He was the son of Isaac and Lucinda (Billingsby) Goodnight. He is the great nephew of Isaac Goodnight of Harrodsburg, Kentucky, born January 1, 1782, who is believed to have been the first white male child born in what is now Kentucky.

Goodnight attended the common schools of the area. In 1870, his family moved to Franklin, Kentucky. He matriculated to Cumberland University in Lebanon, Tennessee earning a degree in 1872 a law degree in 1873. He returned to Franklin, serving as deputy circuit clerk while reading law, and was admitted to the bar in 1874. He commenced practice in Franklin.

On March 12, 1879, Goodnight married Ella Hoy. The couple had one son, Hoy Goodnight.

== Political career ==
In 1877, Goodnight was elected to the Kentucky House of Representatives, serving a single, two-year term. He served as the chairman of the Democratic Kentucky convention at Louisville, Kentucky in 1891. He was elected to represent the Third District in the U.S. House of Representatives in 1888. He was twice re-elected, serving in the Fifty-first, Fifty-second, and Fifty-third Congresses (March 4, 1889 – March 3, 1895). During his tenure, he was a member of the Judiciary Committee, rising to third in seniority on that committee by the end of his third term.

== Later life and death ==
Due to ill health and the fact that his absence from home was hurting his legal practice, Goodnight did not seek re-election in 1894. After leaving Congress, he was elected a judge of the seventh Kentucky circuit in 1897 and served until his death in Franklin on July 24, 1901. He was buried in Green Lawn Cemetery.

His home in Franklin, the Goodnight House, is listed on the National Register of Historic Places.

U.S. House of Representatives
Preceded by W. Godfrey Hunter	United States Representative, Kentucky's 3rd district 1889–1895	Succeeded by W. Godfrey Hunter
