= Amos Davis =

American lawyer and politician

Amos Davis (August 15, 1794 – June 11, 1835) was a United States House of Representatives member from Kentucky. He was born in Mount Sterling, Kentucky, where he completed preparatory studies. Later, he studied law, was admitted to the bar and commenced practice in Mount Sterling, Kentucky. He also served as sheriff of Montgomery County, Kentucky.

Davis was a Kentucky House of Representatives member in 1819, 1825, 1827 and 1828. He was an unsuccessful candidate for election to the Twentieth and Twenty-second Congresses but was elected as an Anti-Jacksonian to the Twenty-third Congress (March 4, 1833 – March 3, 1835). While he was a candidate for reelection, he died in Owingsville, Kentucky, while campaigning in 1835. He was buried in the City Cemetery, Mount Sterling, Kentucky. His brother, Garrett Davis, served as a member of the United States Senate.

U.S. House of Representatives
| Preceded by Albert G. Hawes | Member of the U.S. House of Representatives from Kentucky's 11th congressional district 1833 – 1835 (obsolete district) | Succeeded by Richard French |
