= Don C. Edwards =

American politician

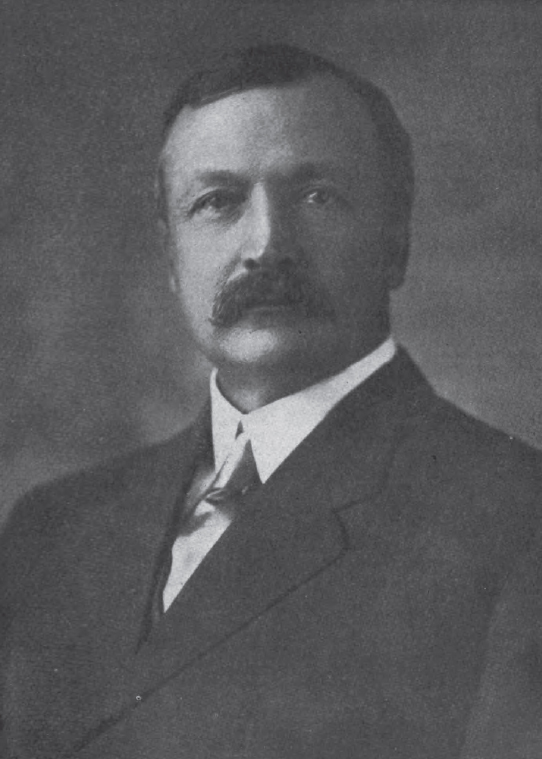
- Edwards, c. 1922

Member of the U.S. House of Representatives from Kentucky's 11th district
- In office March 4, 1905 – March 3, 1911
- Preceded by: W. Godfrey Hunter
- Succeeded by: Caleb Powers

Personal details
- Born: July 13, 1861 Moulton, Iowa
- Died: September 19, 1938 (aged 77) London, Kentucky
- Party: Republican
- Education: Campbell University
- Profession: Banker

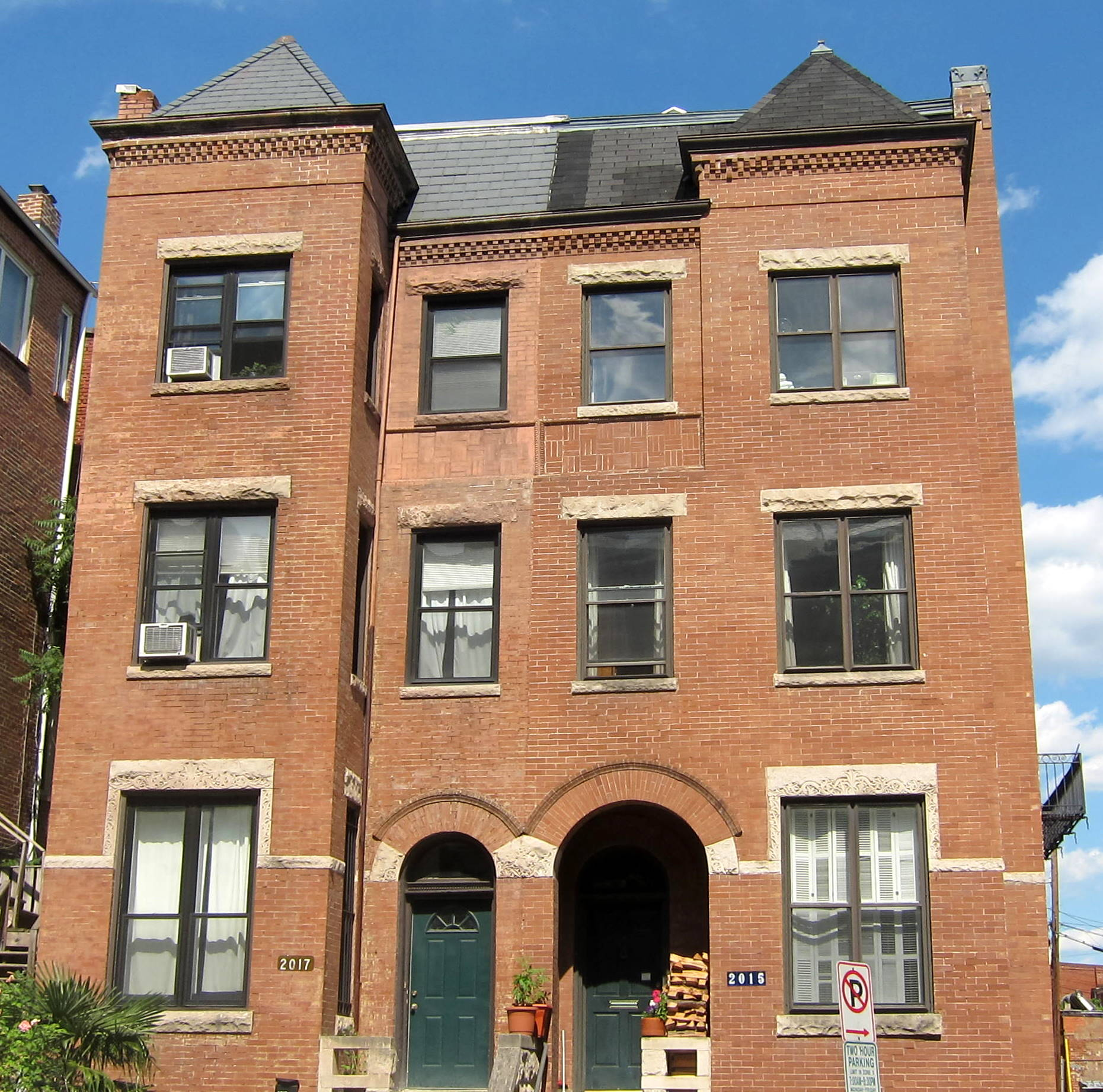
Edwards's former residence (left) in Washington, D.C.

Don Calvin Edwards (July 13, 1861 – September 19, 1938) was a U.S. representative from Kentucky.

== Biography ==
Born in Moulton, Iowa, Edwards moved to Erie, Kansas, with his parents in 1869. He attended the common schools of Iowa and Kansas, and Campbell University, Holton, Kansas. He engaged in banking and in the insurance business in Erie, Kansas, in 1883. He moved to London, Kentucky, in 1892 and engaged in the manufacture of staves and in the wholesale lumber business. He served as president of the National Bank of London, Kentucky. He served as clerk and master commissioner of the Laurel circuit court from 1898 to 1904. He served as chairman of the Kentucky State Republican convention in 1908.

Edwards was elected as a Republican to the Fifty-ninth, Sixtieth, and Sixty-first Congresses (March 4, 1905 – March 3, 1911). He served as chairman of the Committee on Expenditures in the Department of State (Sixty-first Congress). He was an unsuccessful candidate for reelection in 1910 to the Sixty-second Congress. He resumed the lumber and banking business in London, Kentucky. He served as delegate to the Republican National Convention in 1912. He was an unsuccessful candidate for nomination in 1918 to the Sixty-sixth Congress. He died in London, Kentucky, September 19, 1938. He was interred in Pine Grove Cemetery.

U.S. House of Representatives
| Preceded by W. Godfrey Hunter | Member of the U.S. House of Representatives from Kentucky's 11th congressional district 1905 – 1911 (obsolete district) | Succeeded by Caleb Powers |
