= List of United States senators in the 20th Congress =

This is a complete list of United States senators during the 20th United States Congress listed by seniority from March 4, 1827, to March 3, 1829.

Order of service is based on the commencement of the senator's first term. Behind this is former service as a senator (only giving the senator seniority within their new incoming class), service as vice president, a House member, a cabinet secretary, or a governor of a state. The final factor is the population of the senator's state.

Senators who were sworn in during the middle of the two-year congressional term (up until the last senator who was not sworn in early after winning the November 1828 election) are listed at the end of the list with no number.

== Terms of service ==
Class	Terms of service of senators that expired in years
Class 3	Terms of service of senators that expired in 1829 (AL, CT, GA, IL, IN, KY, LA, MD, MO, NC, NH, NY, OH, PA, SC, and VT.)
Class 1	Terms of service of senators that expired in 1831 (AL, DE, GA, IL, KY, LA, MA, ME, MS, NH, NJ, RI, SC, TN, VA, and VT.)
Class 2	Terms of service of senators that expired in 1833 (CT, DE, IN, MA, MD, ME, MO, MS, NC, NJ, NY, OH, PA, RI, TN, and VA)

== U.S. Senate seniority list ==
U.S. Senate seniority
Rank	Senator (party-state)	Seniority date	Other factors
1	Benjamin Ruggles (AJ-OH)	March 4, 1815	
2	Nathaniel Macon (J-NC)	December 5, 1815	
3	James Noble (AJ-IN)	December 11, 1816	
4	Mahlon Dickerson (J-NJ)	March 4, 1817	
5	Thomas Hill Williams (J-MS)	December 10, 1817	
6	Jesse Burgess Thomas (AJ-IL)	November 23, 1818	
7	Richard Mentor Johnson (J-KY)	December 10, 1819	
8	William Rufus de Vane King (J-AL)	December 14, 1819	
9	John Chandler (J-ME)	June 14, 1820	
10	Nehemiah Rice Knight (AJ-RI)	January 9, 1821	
11	Martin Van Buren (J-NY)	March 4, 1821	New York 1st in population (1810)
12	Horatio Seymour (AJ-VT)	March 4, 1821	Vermont 15th in population (1810)
13	David Barton (AJ-MO)	August 10, 1821	Alphabetical (Ba)
14	Thomas Hart Benton (J-MO)	August 10, 1821	Alphabetical (Be)
15	John Henry Eaton (J-TN)	September 27, 1821	
16	Samuel Smith (J-MD)	December 17, 1822	
17	John Branch (DR-NC)	March 4, 1823	Former governor; North Carolina 4th in population (1820)
18	Samuel Bell (AJ-NH)	March 4, 1823	Former governor; New Hampshire 15th in population (1820)
19	Robert Young Hayne (J-NH)	March 4, 1823	
20	Josiah Stoddard Johnston (AJ-LA)	January 15, 1824	
21	Charles Dominique Joseph Bouligny (AJ-LA)	November 19, 1824	
22	Thomas Willis Cobb (J-GA)	December 6, 1824	
23	Littleton Waller Tazewell (J-VA)	December 7, 1824	
24	Dudley Chase (AJ-VT)	March 4, 1825	Former senator
25	William Hendricks (AJ-IN)	March 4, 1825	Former representative (5 years)
26	William Henry Harrison (AJ-OH)	March 4, 1825	Former representative (3 years)
27	John Rowan (J-KY)	March 4, 1825	Former representative (2 years)
28	William Marks (AJ-PA)	March 4, 1825	Pennsylvania 2nd in population (1820)
29	John Macpherson Berrien (J-GA)	March 4, 1825	Georgia 11th in population (1820)
30	Elias Kent Kane (J-IL)	March 4, 1825	Illinois 24th in population (1820)
31	Levi Woodbury (J-NH)	March 16, 1825	
32	Calvin Willey (J-CT)	May 4, 1825	
33	Hugh Lawson White (J-TN)	October 28, 1825	
34	Ashur Robbins (AJ-RI)	October 31, 1825	
35	Nathan Sanford (AJ-NY)	January 14, 1826	
36	Ezekiel Forman Chambers (AJ-VA)	January 24, 1826	
37	Nathaniel Silsbee (AJ-MA)	May 31, 1826	
38	Ephraim Bateman (AJ-NJ)	November 10, 1826	
39	John McKinley (J-AL)	November 27, 1826	
40	William Smith (DR-SC)	November 29, 1826	
41	Henry Moore Ridgely (J-DE)	January 12, 1827	
42	Powhatan Ellis (J-MS)	March 4, 1827	Former senator
43	Louis McLane (J-DE)	March 4, 1827	Former representative (10 years)
44	John Tyler (J-VA)	March 4, 1827	Former representative (4 years, 2 months)
45	Samuel Augustus Foot (AJ-CT)	March 4, 1827	Former representative (4 years, 0 months)
46	Albion Keith Parris (J-ME)	March 4, 1827	Former representative (2 years)
47	Isaac Dutton Barnard (J-PA)	March 4, 1827	
48	Daniel Webster (AJ-MA)	June 8, 1827	
	Oliver Hillhouse Prince (J-GA)	November 7, 1828	
	Jacob Burnet (AJ-OH)	December 10, 1828	
	James Iredell Jr. (J-NC)	December 15, 1828	
	John Holmes (DR-ME)	January 15, 1829	Former representative
	Charles Edward Dudley (J-NY)	January 15, 1829	

== See also ==
- 20th United States Congress
- List of United States representatives in the 20th Congress
