= Hugh F. Finley =

American politician

Hugh Franklin Finley
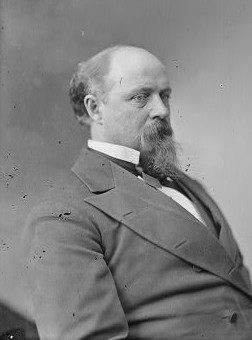

Member of the U.S. House of Representatives from Kentucky's 11th district
- In office March 4, 1887 – March 3, 1891
- Preceded by: Frank Lane Wolford
- Succeeded by: John Henry Wilson

Member of the Kentucky Senate from the 17th district
- In office August 2, 1875 – July 1876
- Preceded by: B. W. S. Huffaker
- Succeeded by: C. W. Lester

Member of the Kentucky House of Representatives from Whitley County
- In office August 5, 1861 – May 1862
- Preceded by: H. S. Tye
- Succeeded by: James M. Jones

Personal details
- Born: January 18, 1833 Tyes Ferry, Kentucky, U.S.
- Died: October 16, 1909 (aged 76) Williamsburg, Kentucky , U.S.

Hugh Franklin Finley (January 18, 1833 – October 16, 1909) was a U.S. Representative from Kentucky, father of Charles Finley.

Born at Tyes Ferry, Kentucky, Finley attended the common schools. He engaged in agricultural pursuits, and studied law, gaining admission to the bar in 1859 and commencing practice in Williamsburg, Kentucky. He served as member of the Kentucky House of Representatives from 1861 to August 1862, when he resigned. Finley was elected as a Kentucky Commonwealth's Attorney in 1862, and served until 1866, when he resigned. He was again elected to the position in 1867, and re-elected in 1868 for six more years.

In 1870, he was an unsuccessful candidate for election to the Forty-second Congress. He served in the Kentucky State Senate in 1875 and 1876, when he resigned. He was appointed in 1876 by President Grant as United States Attorney for Kentucky, and served until 1877. He resumed the practice of law. He served as judge of the fifteenth judicial circuit from 1880 to 1886.

Finley was elected as a Republican to the Fiftieth and Fifty-first Congresses (March 4, 1887 – March 3, 1891). He was an unsuccessful candidate for renomination in 1890. He resumed the practice of law and also engaged in the coal mining business.

He died in Williamsburg, Kentucky at the age of 73, and according to the United States Congress biography, he was interred in Woodlawn Cemetery, yet he was actually buried in Finley Cemetery in Williamsburg, Whitley County, Kentucky. His large upright grave marker lists his political accomplishments.

He married Jane Moss and the couple had two sons and three daughters.

U.S. House of Representatives
Preceded by Frank L. Wolford	Member of the U.S. House of Representatives from Kentucky's 11th congressional district 1887 – 1891 (obsolete district)	Succeeded by John H. Wilson
