= Richard French (American politician) =

American politician

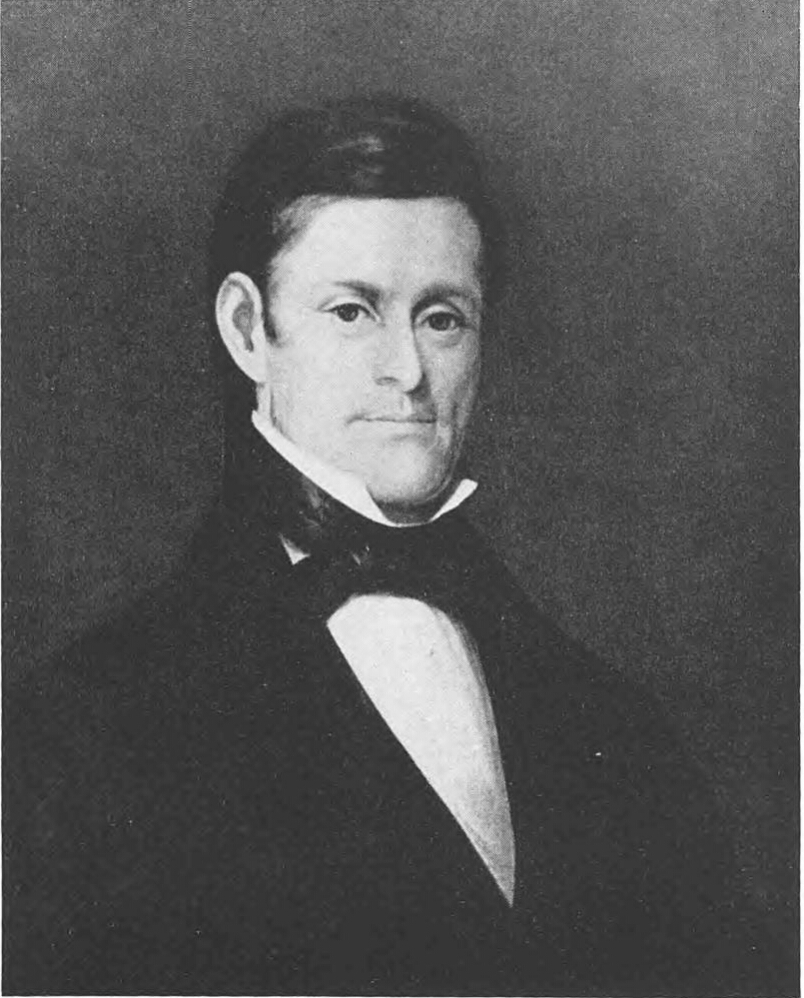
French circa 1840

Richard French (June 20, 1792 – May 1, 1854) was an American lawyer and politician who served three separate times as a U.S. representative from Kentucky.

== Early life and career ==
Born near Boonesborough, Kentucky, French attended private schools. He studied law. He was admitted to the bar in 1820 and commenced practice in Winchester, Kentucky. He served as member of the State house of representatives 1820–1826. He served as judge of the circuit court in 1829.

== U.S. House ==
French was elected as a Jacksonian to the Twenty-fourth Congress (March 4, 1835 – March 3, 1837). He was an unsuccessful candidate for reelection in 1836 to the Twenty-fifth Congress. He was an unsuccessful Democratic candidate for Governor of Kentucky in 1840.

French was elected as a Democrat to the Twenty-eighth Congress (March 4, 1843 – March 3, 1845). Defeated for re-election to the Twenty-ninth Congress, he was again elected to the Thirtieth Congress (March 4, 1847 – March 3, 1849).

== After Congress ==
French resumed the practice of law. He died in Covington, Kentucky, on May 1, 1854, and was interred in the family burial ground near Mount Sterling, Kentucky.

Party political offices
Preceded by Matthews Flournoy	Democratic nominee for Governor of Kentucky; 1840	Succeeded by William Orlando Butler
U.S. House of Representatives
Preceded by Amos Davis	Member of the U.S. House of Representatives from Kentucky's 11th congressional district 1835 – 1837 (obsolete district)	Succeeded by Richard Menefee
Preceded by John White	Member of the U.S. House of Representatives from Kentucky's 9th congressional district 1843 – 1845 (obsolete district)	Succeeded by Andrew Trumbo
Preceded by Andrew Trumbo	Member of the U.S. House of Representatives from Kentucky's 9th congressional district 1847 – 1849 (obsolete district)	Succeeded by John C. Mason
