= 24th Kentucky Infantry Regiment =

- Active: December 31, 1861, to January 31, 1865
- Country: United States
- Allegiance: Union
- Branch: Infantry
- Engagements: Battle of Shiloh; Siege of Corinth; Battle of Perryville; Knoxville Campaign; Atlanta campaign Battle of Resaca; Battle of Kennesaw Mountain; Siege of Atlanta; Battle of Jonesboro

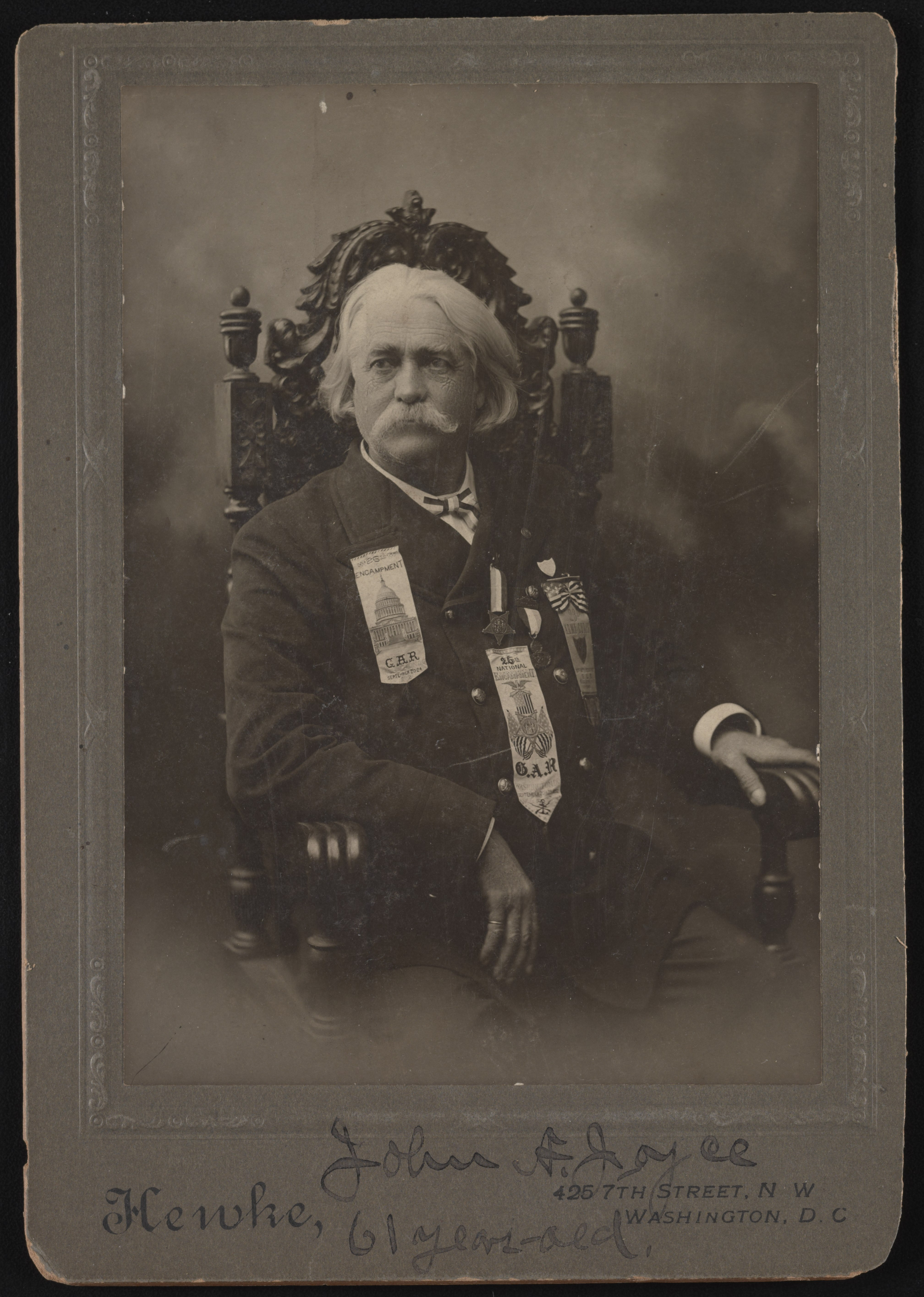
First Lieutenant John Alexander Joyce of Co. I, 24th Kentucky Infantry Regiment. From the Liljenquist Family Collection of Civil War Photographs, Prints and Photographs Division, Library of Congress

The 24th Kentucky Infantry Regiment was an infantry regiment that served in the Union Army during the American Civil War.

== Service ==
The 24th Kentucky Infantry Regiment was organized at Lexington, Kentucky and mustered in for a three-year enlistment on December 31, 1861.

The regiment was attached to 21st Brigade, Army of the Ohio, to January 1862. 21st Brigade, 6th Division, Army of the Ohio, to September 1862. 21st Brigade, 6th Division, II Corps, Army of the Ohio, to November 1862. 2nd Brigade, 1st Division, Left Wing, XIV Corps, Army of the Cumberland, to December 1862. 2nd Brigade, 2nd Division, Army of Kentucky, Department of the Ohio, to January 1863. 1st Brigade, District of Central Kentucky, Department of the Ohio, to June 1863. 2nd Brigade, 1st Division, XXIII Corps, Army of the Ohio, to July 1863. 2nd Brigade, 4th Division, XXIII Corps, to August 1863. 2nd Brigade, 3rd Division, XXIII Corps, to December 1864. Louisa, Kentucky, Military District of Kentucky, to January 1865.

The 24th Kentucky Infantry mustered out of service at Lexington, Kentucky January 31, 1865.

== Detailed service ==
Moved to Louisville, Ky., January 1, 1862; thence to Bardstown, Spring Garden (on Salt River), Lebanon and Munfordville, Ky. March to Nashville, Tenn., February 17–25. March to Savannah, Tenn., March 21-April 6. Battle of Shiloh April 7. Advance on and siege of Corinth, Miss., April 29-May 30. Pursuit to Booneville May 31-June 12. Buell's Campaign in northern Alabama and middle Tennessee June to August. March to Nashville, Tenn.; thence to Louisville, Ky., in pursuit of Bragg, August 21-September 20. Pursuit of Bragg into Kentucky October 1–22. Battle of Perryville, Ky., October 8. March to Nashville, Tenn., October 22-November 7. Ordered to Frankfort, Ky., November 24 and duty there until January 1863. Moved to Louisville, Ky.: thence to Nashville, Tenn. Owing to smallpox breaking out on boat, the regiment was quarantined above Nashville until February; then moved to Winchester, Ky., and duty there until March. At Mt. Vernon and Wild Cat engaged in outpost duty until June. Moved to Lancaster, thence to Camp Nelson, Ky. Burnside's March over Cumberland Mountains and campaign in eastern Tennessee August 16-October 17. Carter's Depot September 20–21. Jonesboro September 21. Watauga September 25. Knoxville Campaign November 4-December 23. Siege of Knoxville November 17-December 5. Armstrong's Hill November 25. Longstreet's assault on Fort Saunders November 29. Blain's Cross Roads December 17. Operations about Dandridge January 16–17. 1864. Strawberry Plains January 22. Operations in eastern Tennessee until April. Moved to Cleveland, Tenn., and Red Clay, Ga. Atlanta Campaign May to September. Demonstrations on Rocky Faced Ridge and Dalton May 8–13. Battle of Resaca May 14–15. Cartersville May 20. Battles about Dallas, New Hope Church and Allatoona Hills May 25-June 5. Near Marietta June 1–9. Operations about Marietta and against Kennesaw Mountain June 10-July 2. Lost Mountain June 15–17. Muddy Creek June 17. Noyes' Creek June 20. Cheyney's Farm June 22. Olley's Creek June 26–27. Assault on Kennesaw June 27. Nickajack Creek July 2–5. Chattahoochie River July 6–17. Isham's Ford, Chattahoochie River, July 8. Decatur July 19. Siege of Atlanta July 22-August 25. Utoy Creek August 5–7. Flank movement on Jonesboro August 25–30. Near Rough and Ready August 31. Battle of Jonesboro August 31-September 1. Lovejoy's Station September 2–6. At Decatur until October. Ordered to Lexington, Ky., and duty there until January 1865.

== Casualties ==
The regiment lost a total of 207 men during service; 2 officers and 28 enlisted men killed or mortally wounded, 3 officers and 174 enlisted men died of disease.

== Commanders ==
- Colonel Lewis Braxton Grigsby
- Colonel John S. Hurt

== See also ==
- List of Kentucky Civil War Units
- Kentucky in the Civil War
