= Kentucky's 11th congressional district =

District of US House of Representatives in Kentucky

Coordinates: 36°50′N 84°00′W

- Obsolete district
- Created: 1820; 1880
- Eliminated: 1840; 1930
- Years active: 1823–1843; 1883–1933

Kentucky's 11th congressional district was a district of the United States House of Representatives in Kentucky. It was lost to redistricting in 1933. Its last representative was Charles Finley.

== List of members representing the district ==
Member	Party	Years	Cong ress	Electoral history	Location
District created March 4, 1823
Philip Thompson (Yellow Banks)	Democratic-Republican	March 4, 1823 – March 3, 1825	18th	Elected in 1822. Retired.	1823–1833; Breckinridge, Butler, Daviess, Grayson, Hardin, Hart, Henderson, Muhlenberg, and Ohio counties
William S. Young (Elizabethtown)	Anti-Jacksonian	March 4, 1825 – September 20, 1827	19th 20th	Elected in 1824. Re-elected in 1827. Died.	1823–1833; Breckinridge, Butler, Daviess, Grayson, Hardin, Hart, Henderson, Muhlenberg, and Ohio counties
Vacant		September 20, 1827– November 5, 1827	20th		1823–1833; Breckinridge, Butler, Daviess, Grayson, Hardin, Hart, Henderson, Muhlenberg, and Ohio counties
John Calhoon (Hardinsburg)	Anti-Jacksonian	November 5, 1827 – November 7, 1827	20th	Elected to finish Young's term. Resigned due to election contest. (Note: The vote of one county had been thrown out, giving the election to Calhoon. By mutual agreement of both candidates, Calhoon subsequently resigned, and both Calhoon and Chilton petitioned the Governor to call a new election.)	1823–1833; Breckinridge, Butler, Daviess, Grayson, Hardin, Hart, Henderson, Muhlenberg, and Ohio counties
Vacant		November 7, 1827– December 22, 1827	20th		1823–1833; Breckinridge, Butler, Daviess, Grayson, Hardin, Hart, Henderson, Muhlenberg, and Ohio counties
Thomas Chilton (Elizabethtown)	Jacksonian	December 22, 1827 – March 3, 1831	20th 21st	Elected to finish Calhoon's term. Re-elected in 1829. Lost re-election.	1823–1833; Breckinridge, Butler, Daviess, Grayson, Hardin, Hart, Henderson, Muhlenberg, and Ohio counties
Albert G. Hawes (Hawesville)	Jacksonian	March 4, 1831 – March 3, 1833	22nd	Elected in 1831. Redistricted to the 2nd district.	1823–1833; Breckinridge, Butler, Daviess, Grayson, Hardin, Hart, Henderson, Muhlenberg, and Ohio counties
Amos Davis (Mount Sterling)	Anti-Jacksonian	March 4, 1833 – March 3, 1835	23rd	Elected in 1833. Died.	1833–1843 [data missing]
Richard French (Mount Sterling)	Jacksonian	March 4, 1835 – March 3, 1837	24th	Elected in 1835. Lost re-election.	1833–1843 [data missing]
Richard Menefee (Mount Sterling)	Whig	March 4, 1837 – March 3, 1839	25th	Elected in 1837. Retired.	1833–1843 [data missing]
Landaff Andrews (Flemingsburg)	Whig	March 4, 1839 – March 3, 1843	26th 27th	Elected in 1839. Re-elected in 1841. Redistricted to the 9th district and lost re-election.	1833–1843 [data missing]
District suspended March 3, 1843
District re-established March 4, 1883
Frank L. Wolford (Columbia)	Democratic	March 4, 1883 – March 3, 1887	48th 49th	Elected in 1882. Re-elected in 1884. Lost re-election.	1883–1893 [data missing]
Hugh F. Finley (Williamsburg)	Republican	March 4, 1887 – March 3, 1891	50th 51st	Elected in 1886. Re-elected in 1888. Lost renomination.	1883–1893 [data missing]
John H. Wilson (Barbourville)	Republican	March 4, 1891 – March 3, 1893	52nd	Redistricted from the 10th district and re-elected in 1890. Retired.	1883–1893 [data missing]
Silas Adams (Liberty)	Republican	March 4, 1893 – March 3, 1895	53rd	Elected in 1892. Lost re-election as an independent.	1893–1903 [data missing]
David G. Colson (Middlesboro)	Republican	March 4, 1895 – March 3, 1899	54th 55th	Elected in 1894. Re-elected in 1896. Retired.	1893–1903 [data missing]
Vincent Boreing (London)	Republican	March 4, 1899 – September 16, 1903	56th 57th 58th	Elected in 1898. Re-elected in 1900. Re-elected in 1902. Died.	1893–1903 [data missing]
Vincent Boreing (London)	Republican	March 4, 1899 – September 16, 1903	56th 57th 58th	Elected in 1898. Re-elected in 1900. Re-elected in 1902. Died.	1903–1913 [data missing]
Vacant		September 16, 1903 – November 10, 1903	58th		1903–1913 [data missing]
W. Godfrey Hunter (Burkesville)	Republican	November 10, 1903 – March 3, 1905	58th	Elected to finish Boreing's term. Retired.	1903–1913 [data missing]
Don C. Edwards (London)	Republican	March 4, 1905 – March 3, 1911	59th 60th 61st	Elected in 1904. Re-elected in 1906. Re-elected in 1908. Lost renomination.	1903–1913 [data missing]
Caleb Powers (Barbourville)	Republican	March 4, 1911 – March 3, 1919	62nd 63rd 64th 65th	Elected in 1910. Re-elected in 1912. Re-elected in 1914. Re-elected in 1916. Retired.	1903–1913 [data missing]
Caleb Powers (Barbourville)	Republican	March 4, 1911 – March 3, 1919	62nd 63rd 64th 65th	Elected in 1910. Re-elected in 1912. Re-elected in 1914. Re-elected in 1916. Retired.	1913–1933
John M. Robsion (Barbourville)	Republican	March 4, 1919 – January 10, 1930	66th 67th 68th 69th 70th 71st	Elected in 1918. Re-elected in 1920. Re-elected in 1922. Re-elected in 1924. Re-elected in 1926. Re-elected in 1928. Resigned when appointed U.S. Senator.	1913–1933
Vacant		January 10, 1930 – February 15, 1930	71st		1913–1933
Charles Finley (Williamsburg)	Republican	February 15, 1930 – March 3, 1933	71st 72nd	Elected to finish Robsion's term. Re-elected in 1930. Retired.	1913–1933
District eliminated March 3, 1933
