= Thomas Chilton =

American politician (1798–1854)

Thomas Chilton (July 30, 1798 – August 15, 1854) was a U.S. representative from Kentucky, a prominent Baptist clergyman, and the ghost writer of David Crockett's autobiography.

Born near Lancaster, Kentucky, a son of Rev. Thomas John Chilton and Margaret Bledsoe, Chilton attended schools in Paris, Kentucky. One week before his seventeenth birthday he married and commenced study for ordination as a Baptist minister. Simultaneously he began studying for the bar with Jesse Bledsoe, a maternal uncle. After setting up a law practice in Owingsville he was elected to the State House of Representatives at age 21. Chilton became enamored of the political persona of Andrew Jackson and carried Jackson's banner to the Twenty-first Congress from Elizabeth, Kentucky. Chilton was first seated in the U.S. House of Representatives on January 11, 1828.

In Washington, DC Chilton took residence at the boarding house of Mary Ball. He was lodged in the same room as a Representative from Tennessee, named David Crockett. The two men rapidly became friends and would spend the better part of the next six years acting in political concert. The most significant event they shared was disillusion with Andrew Jackson, and abandonment of his political party in March 1830. Chilton failed in his bid for reelection to the Twenty-second Congress but was elected as an Anti-Jacksonian to the Twenty-third Congress. By the end of that term both Chilton and Crockett were tired of dealing with the Jackson machine and associated dirty tricks. The two men were glad to turn their backs on Washington. In 1835 Chilton chose to resume the Baptist ministry in addition to law practice. He owned slaves.

== The Narrative ==
In 1834 a Philadelphia publisher released a book titled Narrative of the Life of David Crockett of the State of Tennessee. Many readers suspected that this autobiography was crafted by someone other than Crockett himself. It had indeed been crafted by Chilton, from Crockett's written material and in response to questioning, but the agreement between these friends was absolute public silence on the matter. After a century of historical suspicion the details were unearthed during research by Crockett biographer, James Atkins Shackford. Shackford discovered two letters in Crockett's hand which revealed the circumstances.

The first letter, written to his son John and dated January 10, 1834 says:

I am ingaged in writing a history of my life and I have completed one hundred and ten pages and I have Mr. Chlton [sic] to Correct as I write it.

The second letter, written to Messrs Cary & Hart, publishers, and dated February 23, 1834 says in part:

I wish you also to understand that the Hon. Thos Chilton of Kentucky is intitled to one equal half of the Sixty two and a half per cent of the entire profits of the work as by the agreement between you and my Self -- and also to half the Copy right in any Subsequent use or disposition which may be made of that I have thought proper to advise you of this fact and to request that you will drop him a memorandum recognizing his right as aforesaid that half the Said profits, which would otherwise be due to my Self may be subject to his order and control at all times....It is more over proper that this Should be done in order that if either of us should die our heirs may understand the arrangement. This will therefore be my relinquishment to Mr. Chilton of the interest afore- said one half of which you are duely notified. The manuscript of the Book is in his hand writing though the entire Substance of it is truly my own. The aid which I needed was to Classify the matter but the Style was not altered.

== After leaving Congress ==
Chilton remained in Kentucky for the next four years. In 1839 he removed his family to Talladega, Alabama. This was the location of his younger brother William Parish Chilton who had just been elected to the State legislature. Chilton continued some law practice but also accepted the pulpit of the Hope Baptist Church in Talladega. During a revival meeting, Chilton led to conversion his maternal cousin Robert Emmett Bledsoe Baylor. Baylor subsequently was ordained a minister of the Baptist faith, relocated to Texas, and in 1845 co-founded Baylor University in Independence, Texas. (Baylor was relocated to Waco, Texas in 1885.)

In 1841 Chilton served as president of the Alabama Baptist State Convention. After his first wife died in September 1842, he married a woman from his Talladega congregation and accepted a call to pastor the First Baptist Church of Montgomery, Alabama. Later, he pastored churches in Greensboro and Newbern.

In August 1851 Chilton was invited to pastor the First Baptist Church in Houston, Texas. He removed from Alabama with his wife, Louisa nee Conklin, and their six young children. He began his ministry there December 6, 1851 but resigned October 28, 1853 to pastor a church in Montgomery, Texas. While delivering a sermon on August 15, 1854 he suddenly clutched his chest, collapsed, and died of a heart attack before the congregation.

The town of Chilton, Texas was named for his son, Lysias B. Chilton. A grandson, Horace Chilton became a U.S. Senator from Texas, and was actually the first native born Texan to serve in Congress.

== Genealogical annoyance ==
Thomas Chilton was not the first-born son of Baptist clergyman Thomas John Chilton and does not bear his middle name as a Junior. On August 8, 1815 he received written permission from his father to marry "Frances T. Stoner". The "T" stood for her middle name, Tribble, but Chilton is identified only as Thomas, with no middle initial recorded by his own father. It has been reported, incorrectly, that Thomas Chilton's gravestone in Montgomery County, Texas bears the middle initial "B".

U.S. House of Representatives
Preceded by John Calhoon	Member of the U.S. House of Representatives from Kentucky's 11th congressional district 1827 – 1831 (obsolete district)	Succeeded by Albert G. Hawes
Preceded by Joseph Lecompte	Member of the U.S. House of Representatives from Kentucky's 6th congressional district 1833 – 1835	Succeeded by John Calhoon
