= William S. Young =

American politician

Member of the U.S. House of Representatives from Kentucky's 11th district
- In office March 4, 1825 – September 20, 1827
- Preceded by: Philip Thompson
- Succeeded by: John Calhoon

Personal details
- Born: April 10, 1790 near Bardstown, Kentucky
- Died: September 20, 1827 (aged 37) Elizabethtown, Kentucky
- Party: National Republican Party
- Relatives: Bryan Young (brother)
- Occupation: Physician

William Singleton Young (April 10, 1790 – September 20, 1827) was a U.S. representative from Kentucky, brother of Bryan Young and uncle of John Young Brown.

== Biography ==
Young was born near Bardstown, Kentucky. Although he initially studied medicine with a Dr. Bemiss, of Bloomfield, he graduated from the University of Louisville, Louisville, Kentucky, with a law degree. He commenced practice in Bloomfield, Kentucky, and continued in this after moving to Elizabethtown, Kentucky, in 1814. Young owned slaves.

Young was elected to the Nineteenth Congress. He was reelected to the Twentieth Congress and served from March 4, 1825, until his death in Elizabethtown, on September 20, 1827, before the assembling of the Twentieth Congress. He was interred in Elizabethtown Cemetery.

== See also ==
- List of members of the United States Congress who died in office (1790–1899)

U.S. House of Representatives
Preceded by Philip Thompson	Member of the U.S. House of Representatives from Kentucky's 11th congressional district March 4, 1825 – September 20, 1827 (obsolete district)	Succeeded by John Calhoon
