= John Calhoon =

American politician

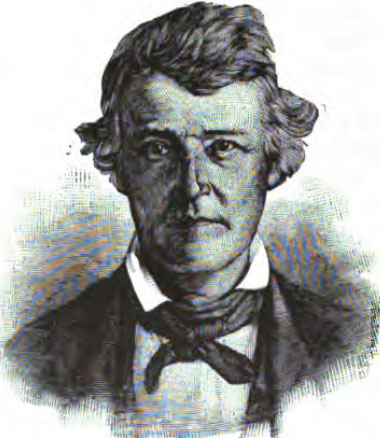

Member of the U.S. House of Representatives from Kentucky
- In office November 5, 1827 – November 7, 1827
- Preceded by: William S. Young
- Succeeded by: Thomas Chilton
- Constituency: 11th district
- In office March 4, 1835 – March 3, 1839
- Preceded by: Thomas Chilton
- Succeeded by: Willis Green
- Constituency: 6th district

Member of the Kentucky House of Representatives
- In office 1820-1821; 1829-1830

Personal details
- Born: April 13, 1793 Henry County, Kentucky, U.S.
- Died: October 15, 1852 (aged 59) Louisville, Kentucky, U.S.
- Party: National Republican; Whig
- Profession: Law

John Calhoon (April 13, 1793 – October 15, 1852) was a United States representative from Kentucky. He was born in Henry County, Kentucky in 1797. He studied law, was admitted to the bar, and practiced.

Calhoon was a member of the Kentucky House of Representatives in 1820, 1821, 1829, and 1830. He was unsuccessful candidate for election to the Twentieth Congress. He received the credentials of an election as an Adams candidate to the Twentieth Congress, held November 5–7, 1827, to fill the vacancy caused by the death of United States Representative William S. Young, but, in order to avoid a contest, resigned and, together with his opponent, Thomas Chilton, petitioned the Governor of Kentucky for a new election. He was again unsuccessful in this election.

Calhoon was elected as an Anti-Jacksonian to the Twenty-fourth Congress and as a Whig to the Twenty-fifth Congress (March 4, 1835 – March 3, 1839) and was not a candidate for reelection to the Twenty-sixth Congress. After leaving Congress, he moved to St. Louis, Missouri in 1839 and resumed the practice of law. He returned to Kentucky and was appointed judge of the fourteenth judicial district in January 1842. He died in 1852 in Louisville, Kentucky.

He is the namesake of Calhoun, Kentucky, the seat of McLean County.

U.S. House of Representatives
Preceded by William S. Young	Member of the U.S. House of Representatives from Kentucky's 11th congressional district 1827	Succeeded by Thomas Chilton
Preceded by Thomas Chilton	Member of the U.S. House of Representatives from Kentucky's 6th congressional district 1835 – 1839 (obsolete district)	Succeeded by Willis Green
