= Crosland =

Crosland or Crossland is a surname, and may refer to:

== In arts and media ==
- Camilla Dufour Crosland (1812–1895), English writer
- William Henry Crossland (1835–1909), British architect
- Thomas William Hodgson Crosland (1865–1924), British author
- Alan Crosland (1894–1936), American film director
- Philip Crosland (1918–2012) British journalist
- Jalan Crossland (fl. from 2000), American bluegrass singer and musician
- Jill Crossland (fl. from 2001), British pianist

== In business ==
- Leonard Crossland (1914–1999), British automobile executive

== In government, military, and politics ==
- Anthony Crosland (1918–1977), British politician
- Sir Joseph Crosland MP (1826–1904), English parliamentarian
- Thomas Crosland MP, (1816–1868), English parliamentarian
- Edward Crossland (1827–1881), Confederate officer in the American Civil War
- William Crossland (Nebraska politician) (1888–1958), American politician from Nebraska

== In science and engineering ==
- Charles Crossland (1844–1916), English mycologist
- Cyril Crossland (1878–1943), English zoologist
- Bernard Crossland (1923–2011), British engineer
- Ronald Crossland (1920–2006), English classical scholar

== In sport ==
- John Crossland (1852–1903), English cricketer
- Samuel Crossland (1851–1908), English cricketer
- Nealy Crosland (1880–1929), English rugby league footballer
- John Crosland (1922–2006), English professional footballer

== Places ==
- Crossland, Kentucky, a town in the United States
- Crossland, Ontario, a community in Canada
- Crossland High School, a school in Maryland

== Other uses ==
- Opel Crossland, a subcompact crossover SUV
