= Oscar Turner =

Oscar Turner may refer to:

- Oscar Turner (1825–1896), U.S. Representative from Kentucky
- Oscar Turner (1867–1902), U.S. Representative from Kentucky
