= Congressman Stone =

Congressman Stone may refer to:

- William Johnson Stone (1841-1923), Congressman from Kentucky
- William Joel Stone (1848–1918), Congressman from Missouri
- Frederick Stone (1820–1899), Congressman from Maryland
- Congressman Stone from Command Decision (film)
