= Samuel L. Casey =

American politician (1821–1902)

Member of the U.S. House of Representatives from Kentucky's 1st district
- In office March 10, 1862 – March 4, 1863
- Preceded by: Henry C. Burnett
- Succeeded by: Lucien Anderson

8th Treasurer of the United States
- In office April 4, 1853 – December 22, 1859
- President: Franklin Pierce; James Buchanan
- Preceded by: John Sloane
- Succeeded by: William C. Price

Personal details
- Born: Samuel Lewis Casey; February 12, 1821 near Caseyville, Kentucky, U.S.
- Died: August 25, 1902 (aged 81) Saint Joseph, Missouri, U.S.

Samuel Lewis Casey (February 12, 1821 – August 25, 1902) was a U.S. representative from Kentucky.

== Early life ==
Born near Caseyville, Kentucky, Casey attended the country schools. He engaged in mercantile pursuits.

== Career ==
In 1853, President of the United States Franklin Pierce nominated Casey to be Treasurer of the United States. Casey held this office from April 4, 1853, to December 22, 1859.

Casey was elected as a Union Democrat to the 37th United States Congress to fill the vacancy caused by the expulsion of Henry C. Burnett and served as representative of Kentucky's 1st congressional district from March 10, 1862, to March 4, 1863.

== Later life and death ==
Casey then retired from active business pursuits. He died in Saint Joseph, Missouri on August 25, 1902. He was cremated and his ashes interred in Caseyville Cemetery, Caseyville, Kentucky.

Government offices
| Preceded by John Sloane | Treasurer of the United States; April 4, 1853 – December 22, 1859 | Succeeded by William C. Price |
U.S. House of Representatives
| Preceded by Henry C. Burnett | Member of the U.S. House of Representatives from Kentucky's 1st congressional district 1862–1863 | Succeeded by Lucien Anderson |
