= Kentucky's 1st congressional district =

U.S. House district for Kentucky

Coordinates: 37°05′05″N 87°11′06″W

- Interactive map of district boundaries since January 3, 2023
- Representative: James Comer; R–Tompkinsville
- Distribution: 63.12% rural; 36.88% urban
- Population (2025): 755,832
- Median household income: $57,745
- Ethnicity: 83.8% White; 7.1% Black; 4.0% Two or more races; 3.8% Hispanic; 0.7% Asian; 0.6% other
- Cook PVI: R+23

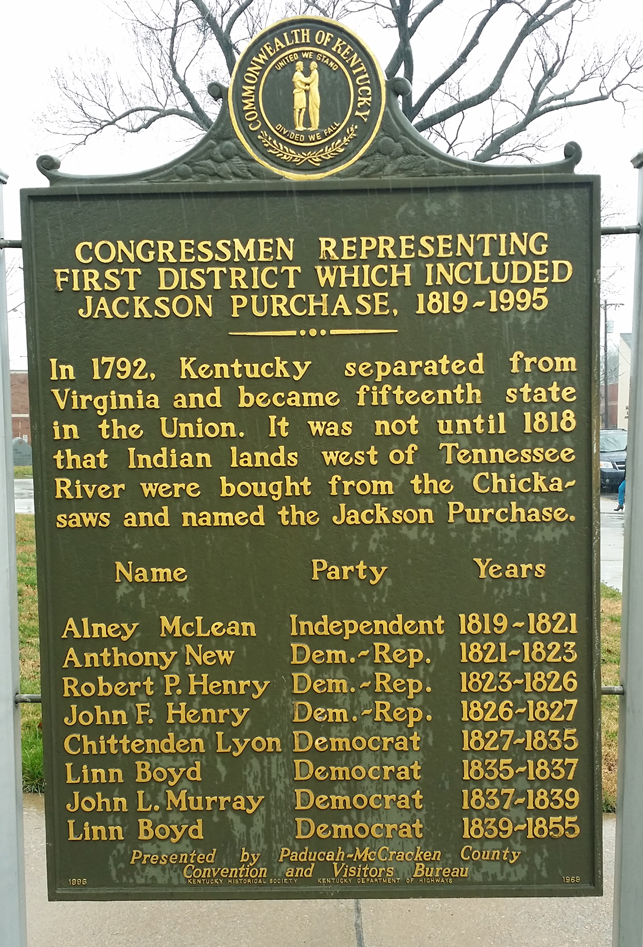
Sign in front of the McCracken, Kentucky Courthouse (in Paducah, Kentucky) commemorating early members of the U.S. House of Representatives representing Jackson Purchase (U.S. historical region). The "First District" in the title actually changed over time. It refers to the Jackson Purchase, which was in the 5th district from 1819 to 1823, the 12th district until 1833, and then the 1st district until the end of the sign's lineage in 1855.

Kentucky's 1st congressional district is a congressional district in the U.S. state of Kentucky. Located in Western Kentucky, and stretching into Central Kentucky, the district takes in Henderson, Hopkinsville, Madisonville, Paducah, Murray, Danville, and Frankfort. The district is represented by Republican James Comer who won a special election to fill the seat of Rep. Ed Whitfield who resigned in September 2016. Comer also won election to the regular term to begin January 3, 2017. With a Cook Partisan Voting Index rating of R+23, it is the second most Republican district in Kentucky and tied for the ninth most Republican district in the United States.

== Voter registration ==
On January 1, 2026, the district had 554,782 registered voters, who were registered with the following parties.

Party	Registration	
Party	Voters	%
Republican	279,107	50.31
Democratic	222,116	40.04
Independent	22,783	4.11
Libertarian	2,510	0.45
Green	359	0.06
Constitution	298	0.05
Socialist Workers	81	0.01
Reform	37	0.01
"Other"	27,491	4.96
Total	554,782	100.00

== Recent election results from statewide races ==
Year	Office	Results
2008	President	McCain 61% - 37%
2012	President	Romney 66% - 34%
2016	President	Trump 70% - 26%
2016	Senate	Paul 64% - 36%
2019	Governor	Bevin 57% - 41%
2019	Attorney General	Cameron 65% - 35%
2020	President	Trump 71% - 28%
2020	Senate	McConnell 65% - 31%
2022	Senate	Paul 71% - 29%
2023	Governor	Cameron 56% - 44%
2023	Attorney General	Coleman 67% - 33%
2023	Auditor of Public Accounts	Ball 69% - 31%
2023	Secretary of State	Adams 69% - 31%
2023	State Treasurer	Metcalf 66% - 34%
2024	President	Trump 73% - 26%

== Composition ==
For the 118th and successive Congresses (based on redistricting following the 2020 census), the district contains all or portions of the following counties and communities:

Adair County (1)

Columbia

Allen County (1)

Scottsville

Anderson County (0)

No incorporated or census-recognized communities

Ballard County (7)

All 7 communities

Boyle County (3)

All 3 communities

Caldwell County (3)

All 3 communities

Calloway County (3)

All 3 communities

Carlisle County (2)

Arlington, Bardwell

Casey County (1)

Liberty

Christian County (9)

All 9 communities

Clinton County (1)

Albany

Crittenden County (3)

All 3 communities

Cumberland County (2)

Burkesville, Marrowbone

Franklin County (1)

Frankfort

Fulton County (3)

All 3 communities

Graves County (10)

All 10 communities

Henderson County (6)

All 6 communities

Hickman County (2)

Clinton, Columbus

Hopkins County (10)

All 10 communities

Livingston County (6)

All 6 communities

Logan County (4)

Adairville, Dunmor (part; also 2nd; shared with Muhlenberg County), Lewisburg, Russellville

Lyon County (2)

Eddyville, Kuttawa

McCracken County (5)

All 5 communities

Marion County (4)

All 4 communities

Marshall County (4)

All 4 communities

Metcalfe County (2)

Edmonton, Summer Shade

Monroe County (3)

All 3 communities

Russell County (2)

Jamestown, Russell Springs

Simpson County (1)

Franklin

Taylor County (1)

Campbellsville

Todd County (5)

All 5 counties

Trigg County (2)

Cadiz, Cerulean (shared with Christian County)

Union County (5)

All 5 communities

Washington County (3)

All 3 communities

Webster County (8)

All 8 communities

== List of members representing the district ==
Member	Party	Service	Cong ress	Electoral history	Location
District created November 9, 1792
Christopher Greenup (Lexington)	Anti-Administration	November 9, 1792 – March 3, 1795	2nd 3rd 4th	Elected September 7, 1792. Re-elected in 1793. Re-elected in 1795. Retired.	1792–1803 "Southern district": Jefferson, Lincoln, Madison, Mercer, Nelson, Shelby, and Washington counties Added in 1797: Green, Hardin, and Logan counties Added in 1799: Barren, Bullitt, Christian, Cumberland, Garrard, Henderson, Henry, Livingston, Muhlenberg, Ohio, Pulaski, and Warren counties Added in 1801: Breckinridge, Knox, and Wayne counties
Christopher Greenup (Lexington)	Democratic-Republican	March 4, 1795 – March 3, 1797	2nd 3rd 4th	Elected September 7, 1792. Re-elected in 1793. Re-elected in 1795. Retired.	1792–1803 "Southern district": Jefferson, Lincoln, Madison, Mercer, Nelson, Shelby, and Washington counties Added in 1797: Green, Hardin, and Logan counties Added in 1799: Barren, Bullitt, Christian, Cumberland, Garrard, Henderson, Henry, Livingston, Muhlenberg, Ohio, Pulaski, and Warren counties Added in 1801: Breckinridge, Knox, and Wayne counties
Thomas T. Davis	Democratic-Republican	March 4, 1797 – March 3, 1803	5th 6th 7th	Elected in 1797. Re-elected in 1799. Re-elected in 1801. Retired.	1792–1803 "Southern district": Jefferson, Lincoln, Madison, Mercer, Nelson, Shelby, and Washington counties Added in 1797: Green, Hardin, and Logan counties Added in 1799: Barren, Bullitt, Christian, Cumberland, Garrard, Henderson, Henry, Livingston, Muhlenberg, Ohio, Pulaski, and Warren counties Added in 1801: Breckinridge, Knox, and Wayne counties
Matthew Lyon (Eddyville)	Democratic-Republican	March 4, 1803 – March 3, 1811	8th 9th 10th 11th	Elected in 1803. Re-elected in 1804. Re-elected in 1806. Re-elected in 1808. Lost re-election.	1803–1813; Adair, Barren, Christian, Cumberland, Henderson, Livingston, Logan, Muhlenberg, Ohio, Pulaski, Warren, and Wayne counties
Anthony New (Elkton)	Democratic-Republican	March 4, 1811 – March 3, 1813	12th	Elected in 1810. Redistricted to the 5th district and retired.	1803–1813; Adair, Barren, Christian, Cumberland, Henderson, Livingston, Logan, Muhlenberg, Ohio, Pulaski, Warren, and Wayne counties
James Clark (Winchester)	Democratic-Republican	March 4, 1813 – August 1816	13th 14th	Elected in 1812. Re-elected in 1814. Leave of absence April 8, 1816. Resigned prior to August 1816.	1813–1823; Bath, Clark, Estill, Fleming, Floyd, Greenup, and Montgomery counties
Vacant		August 1816 – December 2, 1816	14th		1813–1823; Bath, Clark, Estill, Fleming, Floyd, Greenup, and Montgomery counties
Thomas Fletcher (Owingsville)	Democratic-Republican	December 2, 1816 – March 3, 1817	14th	Elected to finish Clark's term. Retired.	1813–1823; Bath, Clark, Estill, Fleming, Floyd, Greenup, and Montgomery counties
David Trimble (Mount Sterling)	Democratic-Republican (Note: Supported the Adams-Clay faction in the 1824 United States presidential election)	March 4, 1817 – March 3, 1825	15th 16th 17th 18th 19th	Elected in 1816. Re-elected in 1818. Re-elected in 1820. Re-elected in 1822. Re-elected in 1824. Lost re-election.	1813–1823; Bath, Clark, Estill, Fleming, Floyd, Greenup, and Montgomery counties
David Trimble (Mount Sterling)	Democratic-Republican	March 4, 1817 – March 3, 1825	15th 16th 17th 18th 19th	Elected in 1816. Re-elected in 1818. Re-elected in 1820. Re-elected in 1822. Re-elected in 1824. Lost re-election.	1823–1833; Bath, Fleming, Floyd, Greenup, Lawrence, Lewis, Montgomery, and Pike counties
David Trimble (Mount Sterling)	Anti-Jacksonian	March 4, 1825 – March 3, 1827	15th 16th 17th 18th 19th	Elected in 1816. Re-elected in 1818. Re-elected in 1820. Re-elected in 1822. Re-elected in 1824. Lost re-election.	1823–1833; Bath, Fleming, Floyd, Greenup, Lawrence, Lewis, Montgomery, and Pike counties
Henry Daniel (Mount Sterling)	Jacksonian	March 4, 1827 – March 3, 1833	20th 21st 22nd	Elected in 1827. Re-elected in 1829. Re-elected in 1831. Lost re-election.	1823–1833; Bath, Fleming, Floyd, Greenup, Lawrence, Lewis, Montgomery, and Pike counties
Chittenden Lyon (Eddyville)	Jacksonian	March 4, 1833 – March 3, 1835	23rd	Redistricted from the 12th district and re-elected in 1833. Retired.	1833–1843 [data missing]
Linn Boyd (New Design)	Jacksonian	March 4, 1835 – March 3, 1837	24th	Elected in 1835. Lost re-election.	1833–1843 [data missing]
John L. Murray (Wadesboro)	Democratic	March 4, 1837 – March 3, 1839	25th	Elected in 1837. Retired.	1833–1843 [data missing]
Linn Boyd (Paducah)	Democratic	March 4, 1839 – March 3, 1855	26th 27th 28th 29th 30th 31st 32nd 33rd	Elected in 1839. Re-elected in 1841. Re-elected in 1843. Re-elected in 1845. Re-elected in 1847. Re-elected in 1849. Re-elected in 1851. Re-elected in 1853. Retired.	1833–1843 [data missing]
Linn Boyd (Paducah)	Democratic	March 4, 1839 – March 3, 1855	26th 27th 28th 29th 30th 31st 32nd 33rd	Elected in 1839. Re-elected in 1841. Re-elected in 1843. Re-elected in 1845. Re-elected in 1847. Re-elected in 1849. Re-elected in 1851. Re-elected in 1853. Retired.	1843–1853 [data missing]
Linn Boyd (Paducah)	Democratic	March 4, 1839 – March 3, 1855	26th 27th 28th 29th 30th 31st 32nd 33rd	Elected in 1839. Re-elected in 1841. Re-elected in 1843. Re-elected in 1845. Re-elected in 1847. Re-elected in 1849. Re-elected in 1851. Re-elected in 1853. Retired.	1853–1863 [data missing]
Henry C. Burnett (Cadiz)	Democratic	March 4, 1855 – December 3, 1861	34th 35th 36th 37th	Elected in 1855. Re-elected in 1857. Re-elected in 1859. Re-elected in 1861. Expelled due to collaborating with the Confederacy.	1853–1863 [data missing]
Vacant		December 3, 1861 – March 10, 1862	37th		1853–1863 [data missing]
Samuel L. Casey (Caseyville)	Union Democratic	March 10, 1862 – March 3, 1863	37th	Elected to finish Burnett's term. Retired.	1853–1863 [data missing]
Lucien Anderson (Mayfield)	Union Democratic	March 4, 1863 – March 3, 1865	38th	Elected in 1863. Retired.	1863–1873 [data missing]
Lawrence S. Trimble (Paducah)	Democratic	March 4, 1865 – March 3, 1871	39th 40th 41st	Elected in 1865. Re-elected in 1867. Re-elected in 1868. Lost renomination.	1863–1873 [data missing]
Edward Crossland (Mayfield)	Democratic	March 4, 1871 – March 3, 1875	42nd 43rd	Elected in 1870. Re-elected in 1872. Retired.	1863–1873 [data missing]
Edward Crossland (Mayfield)	Democratic	March 4, 1871 – March 3, 1875	42nd 43rd	Elected in 1870. Re-elected in 1872. Retired.	1873–1883 [data missing]
Andrew Boone (Mayfield)	Democratic	March 4, 1875 – March 3, 1879	44th 45th	Elected in 1874. Re-elected in 1876. Retired.	1873–1883 [data missing]
Oscar Turner (Oscar)	Independent Democratic	March 4, 1879 – March 3, 1881	46th 47th 48th	Elected in 1878. Re-elected in 1880. Re-elected in 1882. Retired.	1873–1883 [data missing]
Oscar Turner (Oscar)	Democratic	March 4, 1881 – March 3, 1883	46th 47th 48th	Elected in 1878. Re-elected in 1880. Re-elected in 1882. Retired.	1873–1883 [data missing]
Oscar Turner (Oscar)	Independent Democratic	March 4, 1883 – March 3, 1885	46th 47th 48th	Elected in 1878. Re-elected in 1880. Re-elected in 1882. Retired.	1883–1893 [data missing]
William J. Stone (Kuttawa)	Democratic	March 4, 1885 – March 3, 1895	49th 50th 51st 52nd 53rd	Elected in 1884. Re-elected in 1886. Re-elected in 1888. Re-elected in 1890. Re-elected in 1892. Retired.	1883–1893 [data missing]
William J. Stone (Kuttawa)	Democratic	March 4, 1885 – March 3, 1895	49th 50th 51st 52nd 53rd	Elected in 1884. Re-elected in 1886. Re-elected in 1888. Re-elected in 1890. Re-elected in 1892. Retired.	1893–1903 [data missing]
John K. Hendrick (Smithland)	Democratic	March 4, 1895 – March 3, 1897	54th	Elected in 1894. Lost renomination.	1893–1903 [data missing]
Charles K. Wheeler (Paducah)	Democratic	March 4, 1897 – March 3, 1903	55th 56th 57th	Elected in 1896. Re-elected in 1898. Re-elected in 1900. Retired.	1893–1903 [data missing]
Ollie M. James (Marion)	Democratic	March 4, 1903 – March 3, 1913	58th 59th 60th 61st 62nd	Elected in 1902. Re-elected in 1904. Re-elected in 1906. Re-elected in 1908. Re-elected in 1910. Retired to run for U.S. Senator.	1903–1913 [data missing]
Alben W. Barkley (Paducah)	Democratic	March 4, 1913 – March 3, 1927	63rd 64th 65th 66th 67th 68th 69th	Elected in 1912. Re-elected in 1914. Re-elected in 1916. Re-elected in 1918. Re-elected in 1920. Re-elected in 1922. Re-elected in 1924. Retired to run for U.S. Senator.	1913–1933
William V. Gregory (Mayfield)	Democratic	March 4, 1927 – March 3, 1933	70th 71st 72nd	Elected in 1926. Re-elected in 1928. Re-elected in 1928. Re-elected in 1930. Redistricted to the at-large district.	1913–1933
District inactive		March 4, 1933 – March 3, 1935	73rd		
William V. Gregory (Mayfield)	Democratic	March 4, 1935 – October 10, 1936	74th	Redistricted from the at-large district and re-elected in 1934. Died.	1935–1953
Vacant		October 10, 1936 – January 3, 1937	74th		1935–1953
Noble J. Gregory (Mayfield)	Democratic	January 3, 1937 – January 3, 1959	75th 76th 77th 78th 79th 80th 81st 82nd 83rd 84th 85th	Elected in 1936. Re-elected in 1938. Re-elected in 1940. Re-elected in 1942. Re-elected in 1944. Re-elected in 1946. Re-elected in 1948. Re-elected in 1950. Re-elected in 1952. Re-elected in 1954. Re-elected in 1956. Lost renomination.	1935–1953
Noble J. Gregory (Mayfield)	Democratic	January 3, 1937 – January 3, 1959	75th 76th 77th 78th 79th 80th 81st 82nd 83rd 84th 85th	Elected in 1936. Re-elected in 1938. Re-elected in 1940. Re-elected in 1942. Re-elected in 1944. Re-elected in 1946. Re-elected in 1948. Re-elected in 1950. Re-elected in 1952. Re-elected in 1954. Re-elected in 1956. Lost renomination.	1953–1957
Noble J. Gregory (Mayfield)	Democratic	January 3, 1937 – January 3, 1959	75th 76th 77th 78th 79th 80th 81st 82nd 83rd 84th 85th	Elected in 1936. Re-elected in 1938. Re-elected in 1940. Re-elected in 1942. Re-elected in 1944. Re-elected in 1946. Re-elected in 1948. Re-elected in 1950. Re-elected in 1952. Re-elected in 1954. Re-elected in 1956. Lost renomination.	1957–1963
Frank Stubblefield (Murray)	Democratic	January 3, 1959 – December 31, 1974	86th 87th 88th 89th 90th 91st 92nd 93rd	Elected in 1958. Re-elected in 1960. Re-elected in 1962. Re-elected in 1964. Re-elected in 1966. Re-elected in 1968. Re-elected in 1970. Re-elected in 1972. Lost renomination and resigned early.	1957–1963
Frank Stubblefield (Murray)	Democratic	January 3, 1959 – December 31, 1974	86th 87th 88th 89th 90th 91st 92nd 93rd	Elected in 1958. Re-elected in 1960. Re-elected in 1962. Re-elected in 1964. Re-elected in 1966. Re-elected in 1968. Re-elected in 1970. Re-elected in 1972. Lost renomination and resigned early.	1963–1967
Frank Stubblefield (Murray)	Democratic	January 3, 1959 – December 31, 1974	86th 87th 88th 89th 90th 91st 92nd 93rd	Elected in 1958. Re-elected in 1960. Re-elected in 1962. Re-elected in 1964. Re-elected in 1966. Re-elected in 1968. Re-elected in 1970. Re-elected in 1972. Lost renomination and resigned early.	1967–1973
Frank Stubblefield (Murray)	Democratic	January 3, 1959 – December 31, 1974	86th 87th 88th 89th 90th 91st 92nd 93rd	Elected in 1958. Re-elected in 1960. Re-elected in 1962. Re-elected in 1964. Re-elected in 1966. Re-elected in 1968. Re-elected in 1970. Re-elected in 1972. Lost renomination and resigned early.	1973–1983
Vacant		December 31, 1974 – January 3, 1975	93rd		1973–1983
Carroll Hubbard (Mayfield)	Democratic	January 3, 1975 – January 3, 1993	94th 95th 96th 97th 98th 99th 100th 101st 102nd	Elected in 1974. Re-elected in 1976. Re-elected in 1978. Re-elected in 1980. Re-elected in 1982. Re-elected in 1984. Re-elected in 1986. Re-elected in 1988. Re-elected in 1990. Lost renomination.	1973–1983
Carroll Hubbard (Mayfield)	Democratic	January 3, 1975 – January 3, 1993	94th 95th 96th 97th 98th 99th 100th 101st 102nd	Elected in 1974. Re-elected in 1976. Re-elected in 1978. Re-elected in 1980. Re-elected in 1982. Re-elected in 1984. Re-elected in 1986. Re-elected in 1988. Re-elected in 1990. Lost renomination.	1983–1993
Tom Barlow (Paducah)	Democratic	January 3, 1993 – January 3, 1995	103rd	Elected in 1992. Lost re-election.	1993–1997
Ed Whitfield (Hopkinsville)	Republican	January 3, 1995 – September 6, 2016	104th 105th 106th 107th 108th 109th 110th 111th 112th 113th 114th	Elected in 1994. Re-elected in 1996. Re-elected in 1998. Re-elected in 2000. Re-elected in 2002. Re-elected in 2004. Re-elected in 2006. Re-elected in 2008. Re-elected in 2010. Re-elected in 2012. Re-elected in 2014. Retired and resigned early.	1993–1997
Ed Whitfield (Hopkinsville)	Republican	January 3, 1995 – September 6, 2016	104th 105th 106th 107th 108th 109th 110th 111th 112th 113th 114th	Elected in 1994. Re-elected in 1996. Re-elected in 1998. Re-elected in 2000. Re-elected in 2002. Re-elected in 2004. Re-elected in 2006. Re-elected in 2008. Re-elected in 2010. Re-elected in 2012. Re-elected in 2014. Retired and resigned early.	1997–2003
Ed Whitfield (Hopkinsville)	Republican	January 3, 1995 – September 6, 2016	104th 105th 106th 107th 108th 109th 110th 111th 112th 113th 114th	Elected in 1994. Re-elected in 1996. Re-elected in 1998. Re-elected in 2000. Re-elected in 2002. Re-elected in 2004. Re-elected in 2006. Re-elected in 2008. Re-elected in 2010. Re-elected in 2012. Re-elected in 2014. Retired and resigned early.	2003–2013
Ed Whitfield (Hopkinsville)	Republican	January 3, 1995 – September 6, 2016	104th 105th 106th 107th 108th 109th 110th 111th 112th 113th 114th	Elected in 1994. Re-elected in 1996. Re-elected in 1998. Re-elected in 2000. Re-elected in 2002. Re-elected in 2004. Re-elected in 2006. Re-elected in 2008. Re-elected in 2010. Re-elected in 2012. Re-elected in 2014. Retired and resigned early.	2013–2023 34 Counties (Note: Adair, Allen, Ballard, Caldwell, Calloway, Carlisle, Casey, Christian, Clinton, Crittenden, Cumberland, Fulton, Graves, Henderson, Hickman, Hopkins, Livingston, Logan, Lyon, Marshall, Marion, McCracken, McLean, Metcalfe, Monroe, Muhlenberg, Ohio, Russell, Simpson, Taylor, Todd, Trigg, Union, Washington (part), and Webster counties)
Vacant		September 6, 2016 – November 8, 2016	114th		2013–2023 34 Counties
James Comer (Tompkinsville)	Republican	November 8, 2016 – present	114th 115th 116th 117th 118th 119th	Elected to finish Whitfield's term. Elected to full term in 2016. Re-elected in 2018. Re-elected in 2020. Re-elected in 2022. Re-elected in 2024. Re-elected in 2026.	2013–2023 34 Counties
James Comer (Tompkinsville)	Republican	November 8, 2016 – present	114th 115th 116th 117th 118th 119th	Elected to finish Whitfield's term. Elected to full term in 2016. Re-elected in 2018. Re-elected in 2020. Re-elected in 2022. Re-elected in 2024. Re-elected in 2026.	2023–present

== Recent election results ==
=== 2000 ===
Kentucky's 1st Congressional District Election (2000)
Party	Candidate	Votes	%
Republican	Ed Whitfield*	132,115	58.00
Democratic	Brian Roy	95,806	42.000
Total votes		227,921	100.00
Republican hold			

=== 2002 ===
Kentucky's 1st Congressional District Election (2002)
Party	Candidate	Votes	%
Republican	Ed Whitfield*	117,600	65.26
Democratic	Klint Alexander	62,617	34.74
Total votes		180,217	100.00
Republican hold			

=== 2004 ===
Kentucky's 1st Congressional District Election (2004)
Party	Candidate	Votes	%
Republican	Ed Whitfield*	175,972	67.37
Democratic	Billy Cartwright	85,229	32.63
Total votes		261,201	100.00
Republican hold			

=== 2006 ===
Kentucky's 1st Congressional District Election (2006)
Party	Candidate	Votes	%
Republican	Ed Whitfield*	123,618	59.58
Democratic	Tom Barlow	83,865	40.42
Total votes		207,483	100.00
Republican hold			

=== 2008 ===
Kentucky's 1st Congressional District Election (2008)
Party	Candidate	Votes	%
Republican	Ed Whitfield*	178,107	64.35
Democratic	Heather Ryan	98,674	35.65
Total votes		276,781	100.00
Turnout			
Republican hold			

=== 2010 ===
Kentucky's 1st Congressional District Election (2010)
Party	Candidate	Votes	%
Republican	Ed Whitfield*	153,519	71.25
Democratic	Charles K. Hatchett	61,690	28.75
Total votes		215,209	100.00
Republican hold			

=== 2012 ===
Kentucky's 1st Congressional District Election (2012)
Party	Candidate	Votes	%
Republican	Ed Whitfield*	199,956	69.63
Democratic	Charles K. Hatchett	87,199	30.37
Total votes		287,155	100.00
Republican hold			

=== 2014 ===
2014 United States House of Representatives elections in Kentucky
Party	Candidate	Votes	%
Republican	Ed Whitfield (incumbent)	173,022	73.1
Democratic	Charles Kendall Hatchett	63,596	26.9
Total votes		236,618	100.0
Republican hold			

=== 2016 ===
2016 United States House of Representatives elections in Kentucky
Party	Candidate	Votes	%
Republican	James Comer	216,959	72.6
Democratic	Sam Gaskins	81,710	27.3
Independent	Terry McIntosh (write-in)	332	0.1
Total votes		299,001	100.0
Republican hold			

=== 2018 ===
2018 United States House of Representatives elections in Kentucky
Party	Candidate	Votes	%
Republican	James Comer (incumbent)	172,167	68.6
Democratic	Paul Walker	78,849	31.4
Total votes		251,016	100.0
Republican hold			

=== 2020 ===
2020 United States House of Representatives elections in Kentucky
Party	Candidate	Votes	%
Republican	James Comer (incumbent)	246,329	75.0
Democratic	James Rhodes	82,141	25.0
Total votes		328,470	100.0
Republican hold			

=== 2022 ===
2022 United States House of Representatives elections in Kentucky
Party	Candidate	Votes	%
Republican	James Comer (incumbent)	184,157	74.9
Democratic	Jimmy Ausbrooks	61,701	25.1
Total votes		245,858	100.0
Republican hold			

=== 2024 ===
2024 United States House of Representatives elections in Kentucky
Party	Candidate	Votes	%
Republican	James Comer (incumbent)	252,729	74.7
Democratic	Erin Marshall	85,524	25.3
Total votes		338,253	100.0
Republican hold			

== See also ==
- Kentucky's congressional districts
- List of United States congressional districts
