= J. Swagar Sherley =

American politician (1871–1941)

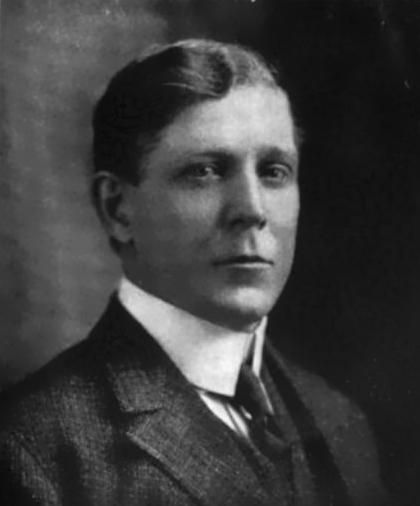

Member of the U.S. House of Representatives from Kentucky's 5th district
- In office March 4, 1903 – March 3, 1919
- Preceded by: Harvey Samuel Irwin
- Succeeded by: Charles F. Ogden

Personal details
- Born: November 28, 1871 Louisville, Kentucky, U.S.
- Died: February 13, 1941 (aged 69) Louisville, Kentucky, U.S.
- Resting place: Cave Hill Cemetery; Louisville, Kentucky, U.S.
- Party: Democratic

Joseph Swagar Sherley (November 28, 1871 – February 13, 1941) was a U.S. representative from Kentucky.

== Biography ==
Born in Louisville, Kentucky, Sherley attended public schools, graduating from the Louisville High School in 1889 and from the law department of the University of Virginia at Charlottesville in 1891. He was admitted to the bar the same year and commenced practice in Louisville, Kentucky.

Sherley was elected as a Democrat to the Fifty-eighth and to the seven succeeding Congresses (March 4, 1903 – March 3, 1919). He served as chairman of the Committee on Appropriations during the Sixty-fifth Congress. He was an unsuccessful candidate for reelection in 1918 to the Sixty-sixth Congress. Following his defeat, he served as director of the division of finance of the United States Railroad Administration from April 1919 to September 1920, when he resigned and resumed the practice of law in Washington, D.C. In January 1933, he was offered the position of Director of the Bureau of the Budget by President-elect Franklin D. Roosevelt, but declined because of ill health. He died while on a visit in Louisville, Kentucky, February 13, 1941 and was interred in Cave Hill Cemetery.

U.S. House of Representatives
Preceded by Harvey S. Irwin	Member of the U.S. House of Representatives from Kentucky's 5th congressional district March 4, 1903 – March 3, 1919	Succeeded by Charles F. Ogden
