= Andrew Boone =

American politician

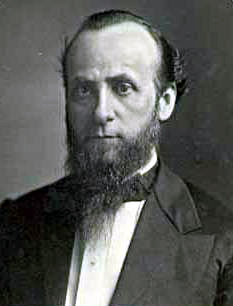

Member of the U.S. House of Representatives from Kentucky's 1st district
- In office March 4, 1875 – March 3, 1879
- Preceded by: Edward Crossland
- Succeeded by: Oscar Turner

Member of the Kentucky House of Representatives from Graves County
- In office August 5, 1861 – December 21, 1861
- Preceded by: John W. Cook
- Succeeded by: Richard Neel

Personal details
- Born: Andrew Rechmond Boone; April 4, 1831 Davidson County, Tennessee, U.S.
- Died: January 26, 1886 (aged 54) Mayfield, Kentucky, U.S.
- Party: Democratic
- Profession: Lawyer; Judge politician

Andrew Rechmond Boone (April 4, 1831 – January 26, 1886) was a United States representative from Kentucky. He was born in Davidson County, Tennessee and moved with his parents to Mayfield, Kentucky in 1833. He attended the public schools. Later, he studied law and was admitted to the bar in 1852 and practiced in Mayfield.

Boone was elected judge of the Graves County court in 1854 and reelected in 1858 and served until 1861, when he resigned. He was a member of the Kentucky House of Representatives in 1861 and a circuit judge for the first judicial district of Kentucky 1868–1874. He was elected as a Democrat to the Forty-fourth and Forty-fifth Congresses (March 4, 1875 – March 3, 1879) but was not a candidate for reelection in 1878. After leaving Congress, he was chairman of the Kentucky Railroad Commission 1882–1886. He died in Mayfield, Kentucky in 1886 and was buried in Mayfield Cemetery.

U.S. House of Representatives
Preceded by Edward Crossland	Member of the U.S. House of Representatives from Kentucky's 1st congressional district March 4, 1875 – March 3, 1879	Succeeded by Oscar Turner
