= 8th Kentucky Infantry Regiment (Confederate) =

- Active: September 1861 – May 4, 1865
- Country: Confederate States of America
- Branch: Confederate States Army
- Type: Infantry & Mounted Infantry
- Engagements: Battle of Fort Donelson; Vicksburg Campaign; Siege of Jackson; Battle of Tupelo; Battle of Franklin; Wilson's Raid

The 8th Kentucky Infantry Regiment was an infantry regiment that served in the Confederate States Army during the American Civil War.

== Service ==
The 8th Kentucky Infantry Regiment was organized in September 1861, at Camp Boone in Montgomery County, Tennessee, because Kentucky had officially declared its neutrality in the war. Henry Cornelius Burnett, a former member of the United States House of Representatives, helped organize the regiment and was commissioned its colonel, but he never took active command.

The regiment was captured at the Battle of Fort Donelson in February 1862. Of the 312 men engaged in the battle, 99 were killed or wounded. Burnett had joined the regiment prior to the battle, again not commanding, but escaped capture by leaving on a river boat with Brig. Gen. John B. Floyd's command. Burnett then resigned from the army to serve full-time as a Confederate senator for Kentucky. After being exchanged in September 1862, the regiment was attached first to Brig. Gen. Lloyd Tilghman's Brigade, and then to Brig. Gen. Abraham Buford's Brigade in the Department of Mississippi and East Louisiana.

The regiment fought under Generals Earl Van Dorn and John C. Pemberton during the Vicksburg Campaign. Prior to the surrender of Vicksburg on July 4, 1863, Colonel Hylan Benton Lyon and 250 men of the 8th Kentucky managed to fight their way out. Lyon led them to Jackson, Mississippi, where they joined the Confederate forces stationed there.

In Spring 1864, the 8th Kentucky was converted to mounted infantry and fought the remainder of the war as dragoons. It served under Lt. Gen. Nathan Bedford Forrest for much of that time.

The 8th Kentucky Regiment surrendered on May 4, 1865, at Columbus, Mississippi, nearly a month after Robert E. Lee's surrender at Appomattox Court House in Virginia. The regiment was paroled and the men allowed to make their way home on their own.

== Battles and skirmishes of the 8th Kentucky Infantry Regiment ==
- Fought on 13 February 1862 at Fort Donelson, TN
- Fought on 15 February 1862 at Fort Donelson, TN
- Fought on 16 February 1862 at Fort Donelson, TN
- Fought on 6 April 1862 at Shiloh, TN (those who escaped capture at Fort Donelson)
- Fought on 1 December 1862
- Fought on 2 December 1862 at Tallahatchie River
- Fought on 4 December 1862
- Fought on 5 December 1862 at Coffeeville, MS
- Fought on 16 May 1863 at Baker's Creek, MS
- Fought on 4 July 1863 at Vicksburg, MS
- Fought on 10 July 1863 at Jackson, MS
- Fought on 11 July 1863 at Jackson, MS
- Fought on 15 July 1863 at Harrisburg, MS
- Fought on 17 July 1863 at Jackson, MS
- Fought on 22 December 1863
- Fought on 15 February 1864 at Canton, MS
- Fought on 25 March 1864 at Paducah, KY
- Fought on 1 April 1864
- Fought on 18 April 1864 at Paducah, KY
- Fought on 20 April 1864 in Kentucky
- Fought on 10 June 1864 at Tishomingo Creek, MS
- Fought on 11 June 1864 at Tishomingo Creek, MS
- Fought on 20 June 1864 at Kenesaw Mountain, GA
- Fought on 14 July 1864 at Harrisburg, MS

== Commanders ==
- Colonel Henry Cornelius Burnett - commissioned, but never commanded
- Colonel Hylan Benton Lyon
- Lieutenant Colonel A. R. Shacklett
- Major Jabez Bingham
- Major R. W. Henry

== See also ==
- List of Kentucky Civil War Confederate units
- Kentucky in the Civil War
