= Charles F. Ogden =

American politician

Charles Franklin Ogden
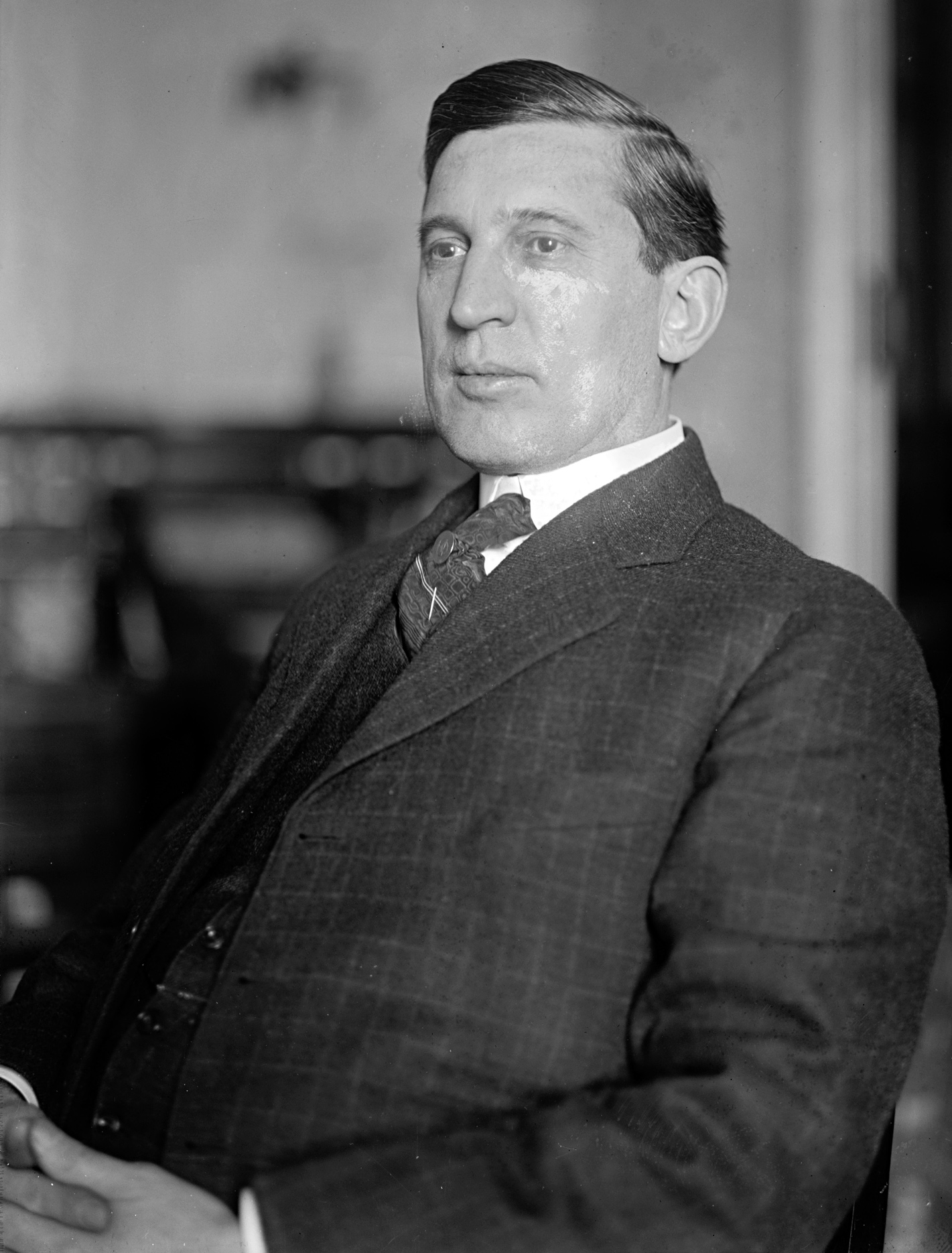

Member of the U.S. House of Representatives from 's 5th district
- In office March 4, 1919 – March 3, 1923
- Preceded by: J. Swagar Sherley
- Succeeded by: Maurice Thatcher

Member of the Kentucky House of Representatives from the 47th district
- In office January 1, 1898 – January 1, 1900
- Preceded by: C. S. Dodson
- Succeeded by: John R. Kelday

Personal details
- Born: February 4, 1873 Charlestown, Indiana, U.S.
- Died: April 10, 1933 (aged 60) Louisville, Kentucky, U.S.

Charles Franklin Ogden (February 4, 1873 – April 10, 1933) was a U.S. representative from Kentucky.

Born in Charlestown, Indiana, Ogden graduated from Jeffersonville High School, Jeffersonville, Indiana. He graduated from the University of Louisville Law School, Louisville, Kentucky, 1896.

He was a lawyer in private practice. He served as member of the Kentucky House of Representatives from 1898 to 1899. Company H, Eighth Regiment, United States Volunteer Infantry, Spanish–American War. He was an unsuccessful candidate for county attorney in 1901. He was an unsuccessful candidate for Kentucky state senator in 1902.

Ogden was elected as a Republican to the Sixty-sixth and to the succeeding Congress (March 4, 1919 – March 3, 1923). He was not a candidate for renomination to the Sixty-eighth Congress in 1922.

He died on April 10, 1933, in Louisville, Kentucky. He was interred in Resthaven Cemetery, Louisville, Kentucky.

U.S. House of Representatives
Preceded by J. Swagar Sherley	Member of the U.S. House of Representatives from Kentucky's 5th congressional district March 4, 1919 – March 3, 1923	Succeeded by Maurice Thatcher
