= William C. Price =

American lawyer and politician (1816–1901)

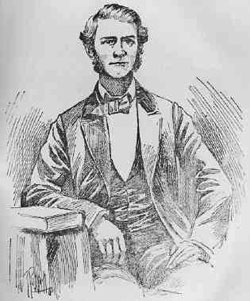

9th Treasurer of the United States
- In office February 28, 1860 – March 21, 1861
- President: James Buchanan; Abraham Lincoln
- Preceded by: Samuel L. Casey
- Succeeded by: Francis E. Spinner

Personal details
- Born: William Cecil Price; 1816 Russell County, Virginia, U.S.
- Died: 1901 (aged 84–85)
- Party: Democratic
- Relatives: Sterling Price (double cousin)
- Education: Knoxville College
- Occupation: Lawyer; judge

William Cecil Price (1816–1901) was an American lawyer and judge who was active in the proslavery faction of the Missouri Democratic Party from the 1840s on, and who served as Treasurer of the United States from 1860 to 1861.

== Early life ==
William C. Price was born in Russell County, Virginia in 1816. He was double cousin of Sterling Price. A farmer William Price moved to Greene County, Missouri in 1836. He then attended Knoxville College before returning to Missouri to work as a teacher and store clerk and to read law.

== Career ==
He became Deputy Sheriff of Greene County in 1840. In 1841, he took an administrative position with the Greene County court. He was admitted to the bar in 1844. In 1847, he was elected as a probate judge with the Greene County court.

Price was active in the proslavery wing of the Missouri Democratic Party. Price claimed that he had originated the idea that the Missouri Compromise must be repealed. In 1844, he traveled through Missouri, warning slaveholders of the dangers to their situation if the Missouri Compromise were not repealed. Price was a supporter of the leader of the Missouri pro-slavery Democrats, Claiborne Fox Jackson, and opposed the Bentonite faction of the Missouri Democratic Party. Price was the author of the so-called Jackson Resolutions that Claiborne Fox Johnson introduced in the Missouri General Assembly in December 1848. The Jackson Resolutions declared that the actions of the Northern states had released the slaveholding states from any obligation to comply with the terms of the Missouri Compromise; that the people in any of the Territories of the United States had the right to determine for themselves if they would permit slavery; and that any Act of Congress conflicting with the Jackson Resolutions would require the slaveholding states to band together to protect themselves against northern aggression.

During the period when the Compromise of 1850 was being discussed, Price met in New Orleans with Jefferson Davis, Judah P. Benjamin, and Robert Toombs. At this meeting, these pro-slavery Democrats concluded that if slavery were not expanded westward, conflict with the North and the secession of the South was inevitable.

Price was elected to the Missouri Senate in 1854. He resigned in 1857 when he was appointed as a judge of the circuit court. In 1859, Governor of Missouri Samuel Medary appointed Price to represent Missouri in discussions with the United States General Land Office about the use of swamp and overflowed lands.

=== Treasurer of the United States ===
In 1860, President of the United States James Buchanan named Price Treasurer of the United States, an office Price held from February 28, 1860 to March 21, 1861.

With the outbreak of the American Civil War, Price joined Missouri's Confederate brigade, under the command of his cousin, Sterling Price. He was taken prisoner by Union forces at the Battle of Pea Ridge (March 6–8, 1862) and was imprisoned at Alton, Illinois for eight months. He was then exchanged for a Union prisoner held by the Confederacy at Vicksburg, Mississippi. Confederate President Jefferson Davis then assigned him as a recruiting officer in Missouri with the rank of Major.

Price resigned in 1864 and moved to Arkansas in an attempt to rebuild his finances as a farmer.

== Later life and death ==
After the war, he returned to Missouri, practicing law first at St. Louis, Missouri, later at Springfield, Missouri.

A longtime member of the Methodist Episcopal Church, South, Price became increasingly interested in theological topics in his later years. He has been described as a "religious fanatic."

Price died in 1901.

Government offices
Preceded by Samuel L. Casey	Treasurer of the United States; February 28, 1860 – March 21, 1861	Succeeded by Francis E. Spinner
