= John K. Hendrick =

American politician (1849–1921)

John Kerr Hendrick
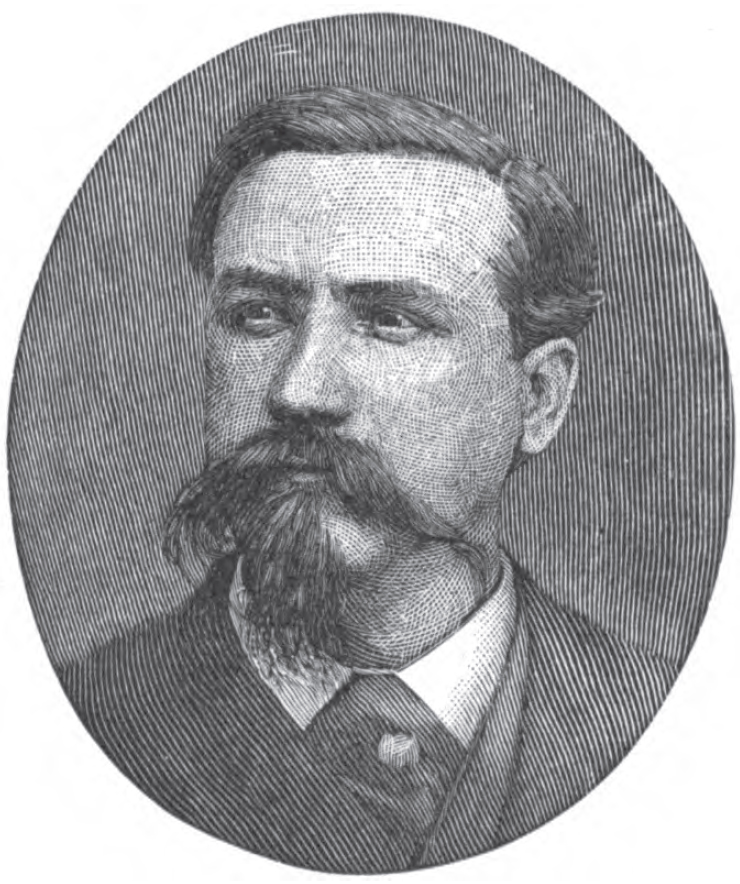

Member of the U.S. House of Representatives from Kentucky's 1st district
- In office March 4, 1895 – March 3, 1897
- Preceded by: William Johnson Stone
- Succeeded by: Charles K. Wheeler

Member of the Kentucky Senate from the 3rd district
- In office August 1, 1887 – August 3, 1891
- Preceded by: R. A. Burnett
- Succeeded by: Tipton A. Miller

Personal details
- Born: October 10, 1849 Caswell County, North Carolina
- Died: June 20, 1921 (aged 71) Paducah, Kentucky
- Resting place: Maplelawn Cemetery
- Party: Democratic
- Profession: Lawyer

John Kerr Hendrick (October 10, 1849 – June 20, 1921) was a U.S. representative from Kentucky.

Born in Caswell County, North Carolina, Hendrick moved with his parents to Logan County and later to Todd County, Kentucky, attended private schools and Bethel College, Russellville, Kentucky, moved to Crittenden County, Kentucky, in 1869 and engaged in teaching school. He studied law and was admitted to the bar in 1874, commencing practice in Smithland, Kentucky. He served as prosecuting attorney of Livingston County from 1878 to 1886, and as member of the Kentucky Senate from 1887 to 1891. During that time, he served as delegate to the 1888 Democratic National Convention.

Hendrick was elected as a Democrat to the Fifty-fourth Congress (March 4, 1895 – March 3, 1897). He was an unsuccessful candidate for renomination in 1896.

He resumed the practice of law in Paducah, Kentucky, where he died June 20, 1921. He was interred in Maplelawn Cemetery.

== Footnotes ==
U.S. House of Representatives
Preceded by William J. Stone	Member of the U.S. House of Representatives from Kentucky's 1st congressional district 1895–1897	Succeeded by Charles K. Wheeler
