= Harvey Samuel Irwin =

American politician (1844–1916)

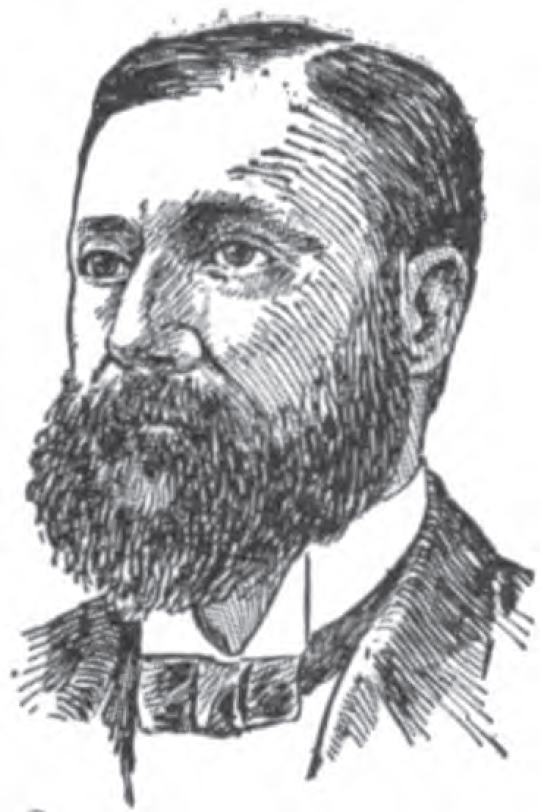

Member of the U.S. House of Representatives from Kentucky's 5th district
- In office March 4, 1901 – March 3, 1903
- Preceded by: Oscar Turner
- Succeeded by: J. Swagar Sherley

Personal details
- Born: December 10, 1844 Highland County, Ohio, U.S.
- Died: September 3, 1916 (aged 71) Vienna, Virginia, U.S.
- Resting place: Cave Hill Cemetery; Louisville, Kentucky, U.S.
- Party: Republican
- Profession: Lawyer; politician
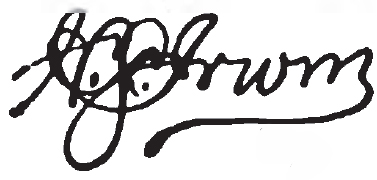
- Signature

Military service
- Allegiance: Union
- Branch/service: Union Army
- Rank: Lieutenant
- Battles/wars: American Civil War

Harvey Samuel Irwin (December 10, 1844 – September 3, 1916) was a U.S. representative from Kentucky.

Born in Highland County, Ohio, Irwin attended the public schools. He was graduated from the high school of Greenfield, Ohio. He studied law, but abandoned the same to enlist in the Union Army during the Civil War. Assisted in raising a regiment of Artillery and was commissioned a lieutenant. Transferred to a special corps in the Regular Army, in which he served until the close of the war. He settled in Louisville, Kentucky. He resumed the study of law. He was admitted to the bar and practiced. He was appointed successively assistant internal revenue assessor, deputy clerk of the United States district court, and chief deputy collector of the fifth internal revenue district of Kentucky. Railroad commissioner in 1895.

Irwin was elected as a Republican to the Fifty-seventh Congress (March 4, 1901 – March 3, 1903). He was an unsuccessful candidate for reelection in 1902. He resumed the practice of law in Washington, D.C. He was licensed as an evangelist in Washington, D.C., in 1913. Had a charge in Idylwood and Vienna, Virginia. He died in Vienna, Virginia, September 3, 1916. He was interred in Cave Hill Cemetery, Louisville, Kentucky.

U.S. House of Representatives
Preceded by Oscar Turner	Member of the U.S. House of Representatives from Kentucky's 5th congressional district March 4, 1901 – March 3, 1903	Succeeded by J. Swagar Sherley
