= Francis E. Spinner =

American politician

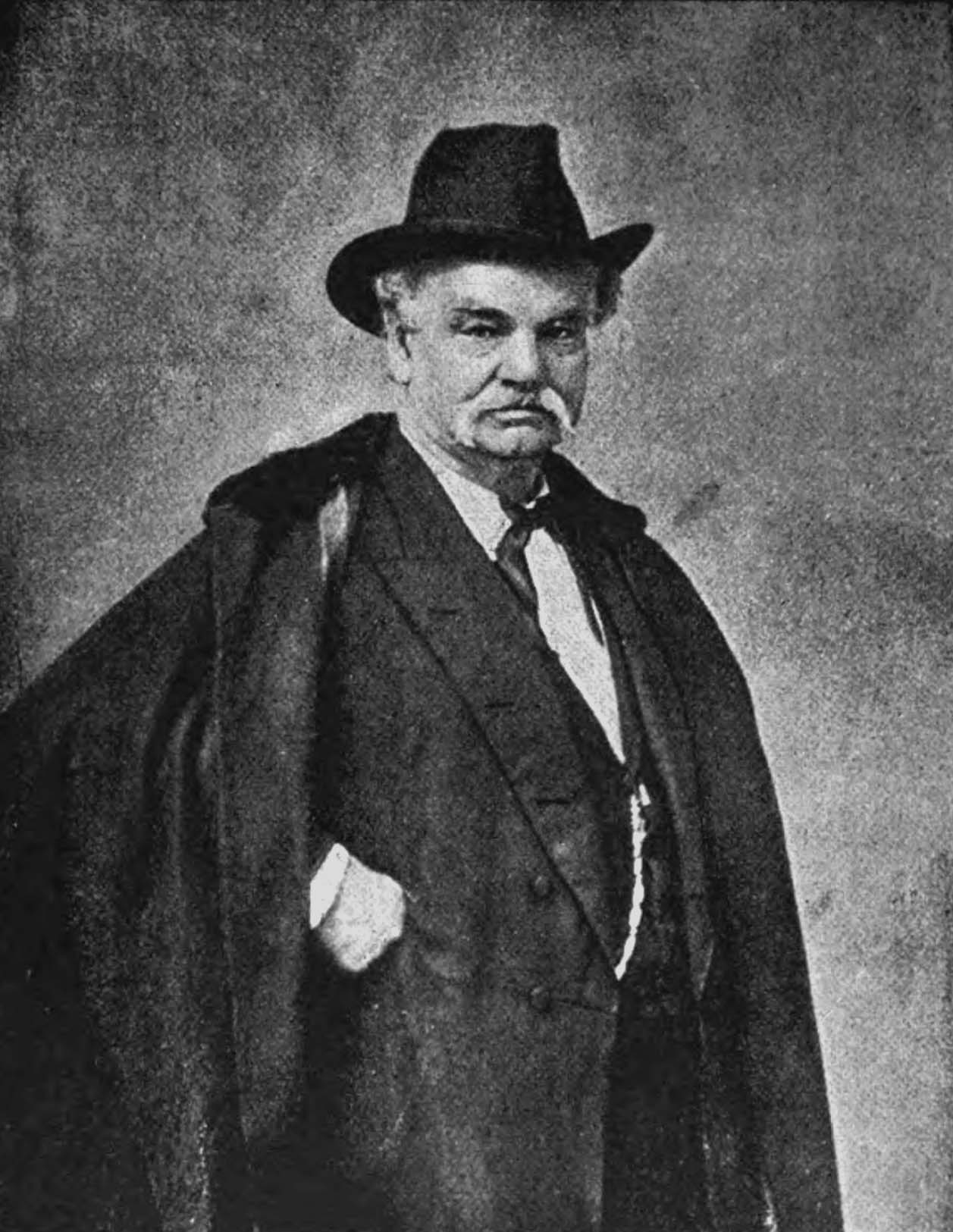

10th Treasurer of the United States
- In office March 16, 1861 – July 30, 1875
- President: Abraham Lincoln; Andrew Johnson; Ulysses S. Grant
- Preceded by: William C. Price
- Succeeded by: John C. New

Member of the U.S. House of Representatives from New York's 17th district
- In office March 4, 1855 – March 3, 1861
- Preceded by: Bishop Perkins
- Succeeded by: Socrates N. Sherman

Personal details
- Born: Francis Elias Spinner; January 21, 1802 German Flatts, New York, U.S.
- Died: December 31, 1890 (aged 88) Jacksonville, Florida, U.S.
- Resting place: Mohawk Cemetery; Mohawk, New York
- Parent(s): John Peter Spinner; Mary Magdalene Fidelis Brument Spinner
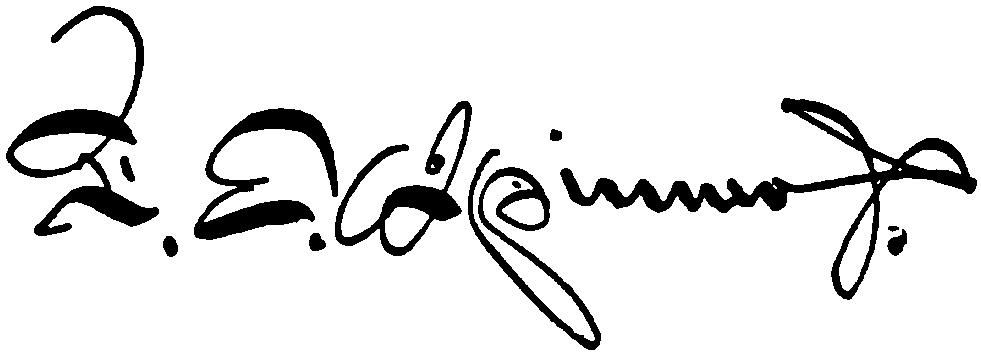
- Signature

Francis Elias Spinner (January 21, 1802 – December 31, 1890) was an American politician from New York. He served as Treasurer of the United States from 1861 to 1875, and was the first administrator in the federal government to employ women for clerical jobs.

== Life ==
His father was John Peter Spinner (born in Werbach, Baden, January 18, 1768; died in German Flatts, New York, May 27, 1848), a Catholic priest who became a Protestant, married Mary Magdalene Fidelis Brument, emigrated to the United States in 1801, and was pastor of two German-speaking Dutch Reformed churches, at Herkimer and German Flatts until his death.

Francis Spinner was the eldest of nine children, six sons and three daughters. His father instructed him in languages, and in the common schools of Herkimer County he learned English grammar, reading, writing and arithmetic. His father required Spinner to learn a trade.

=== Early career ===
Francis elected to become a merchant, and for about a year was employed as a clerk in a store. The store failed, and Francis was apprenticed to a confectioner in Albany.

In Albany, Spinner made the acquaintance of some educated men who took an interest in his welfare. Peter Gansevoort allowed him the use of his library. Two years after his arrival, when his father found he was being employed as a salesman and bookkeeper, Spinner was removed from that situation and apprenticed to a saddle and harness maker in Amsterdam, New York. Here Spinner became a shareholder in the circulating library, and studied its volumes when he wasn't busy learning his trade.

In 1824, Spinner moved back to Herkimer County, where he engaged in mercantile pursuits. In 1826, he married Caroline Caswell of Herkimer. He entered the state militia, and by 1834 had risen to the rank of major general. He was appointed deputy sheriff in 1829, and was sheriff of the County from 1834 to 1837. He was appointed one of the commissioners for the construction of the state lunatic asylum at Utica, New York in 1838. When he was removed from this post on political grounds, he engaged in banking, first as cashier and later as president, at the Mohawk Bank.

He was state inspector of turnpikes, and served as commissioner and supervisor of schools. He was appointed auditor and deputy naval officer in charge of the Port of New York in 1845 and served four years.

=== Congressman ===
Spinner was elected as an anti-slavery Democrat to the 34th Congress. An active Republican from the formation of the party, he was re-elected as a Republican to the 35th and 36th United States Congresses, altogether serving from March 4, 1855, to March 3, 1861. He served on the Committee on Privileges and Elections, on a special committee to investigate the assault made by Preston Brooks on Charles Sumner, and on a conference committee of both houses on the Army appropriation bill, which the senate had rejected on account of a clause that forbade the use of the military against Kansas settlers. During his last term (36th Congress), he was chairman of the Committee on Accounts.

=== Treasurer ===
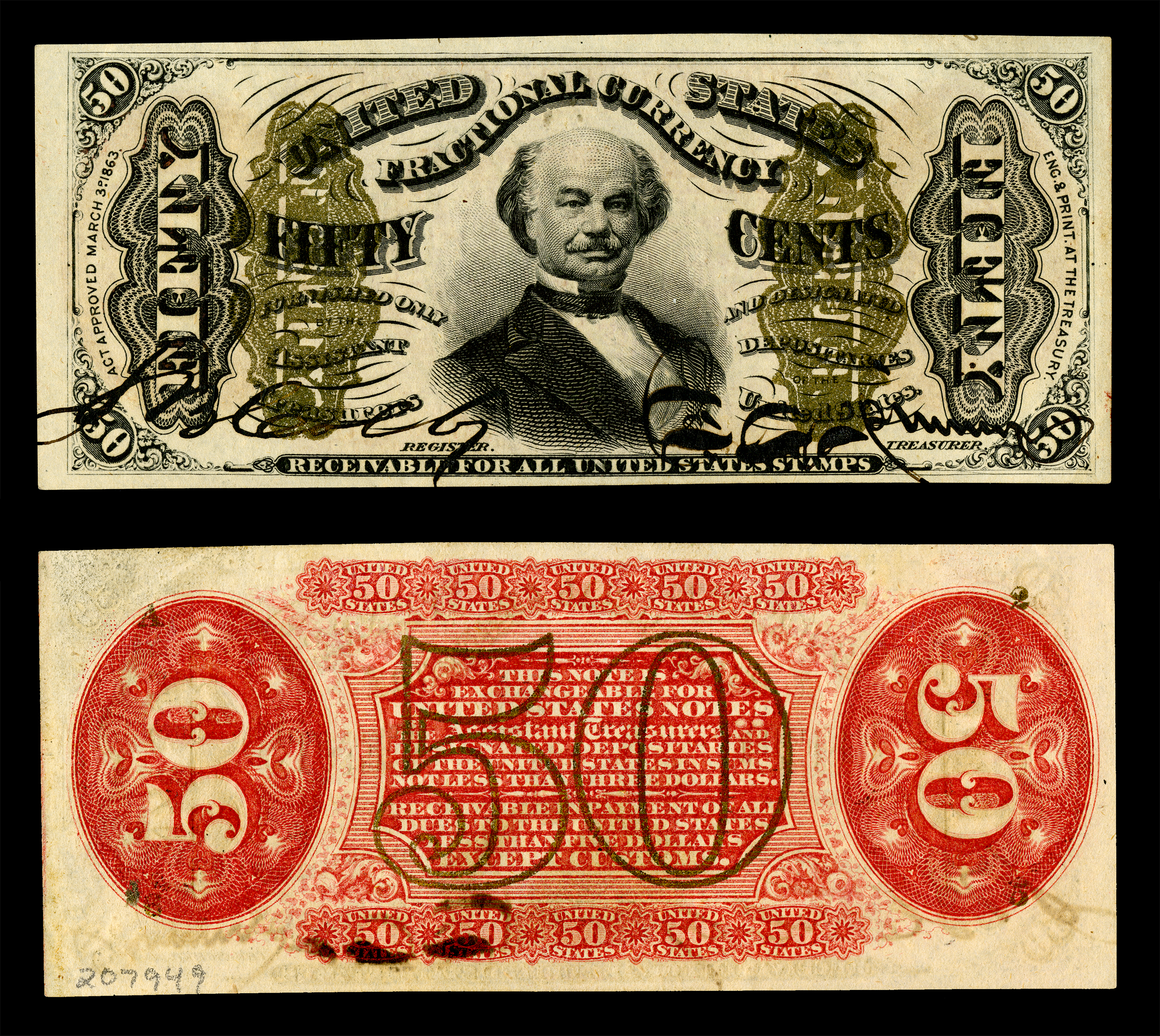
Fifty-cent Fractional Currency depicting Spinner, with autograph signature.

On the recommendation of Secretary of the Treasury Salmon P. Chase, he was appointed by President Lincoln as Treasurer of the United States and served from March 16, 1861, until his resignation on July 1, 1875. Within 60 days of his assuming office, the Civil War broke out and the expenditures of the federal government increased dramatically.

He was the first to suggest the employment of women in government offices. During the Civil War, many of the clerks of the Treasury Department joined the army, and Spinner suggested to Secretary Chase the advisability of employing women. As a proof of concept, Spinner hired a woman to trim money. He chose Jennie Douglas, a brawny woman and the former teacher of his daughter. Douglas was so successful that Spinner later stated, "her first day's work settled the matter forever in her and in the women's favor. The men left and women took their place." He subsequently employed seven more women.

Spinner's suggestion was taken up, and he carried it into effect successfully, though not without much opposition. The women were first employed to count money, and later took up various clerical duties. He eventually hired over 100 women, paid them well, and retained them after the war was over.

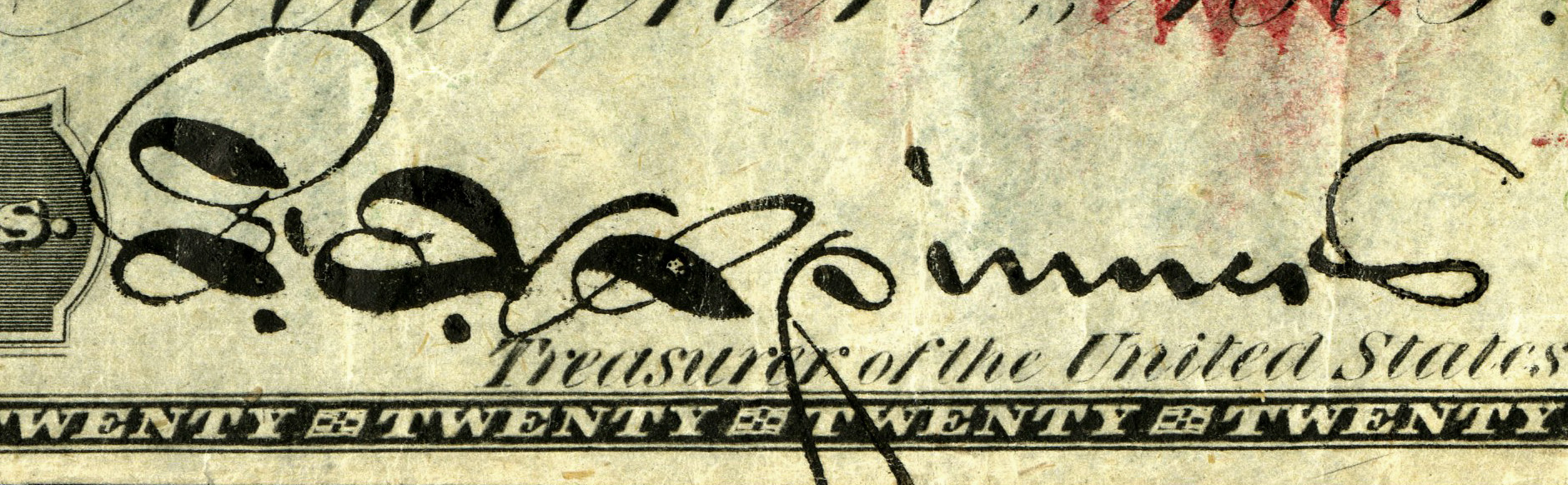
Spinner's signature on an 1862 issue United States Note.

He signed the different series of paper money in a singular handwriting, which he cultivated in order to prevent counterfeiting. His signature on the "greenbacks" of the United States was the most familiar autograph in the country. The history Spinner gave of his signature was:

I first practiced it while in the sheriff's office about 1835; I used it while commissioner for building the asylum at Utica, and as cashier and president of the Mohawk valley bank, and for franking while in congress. It was brought to its highest perfection when I was treasurer.

=== Resignation and later career ===
He resigned his office because of a disagreement over staffing appointments. A new Secretary refused to give him final say over his staff. Spinner thought that, as a bonded officer, he should have control over the appointment of clerks for whose acts he was responsible. When he resigned his office, the money in the treasury was counted. The result showed a very small discrepancy, and many days were spent in recounting and examining the books of accounts, until finally the mistake was discovered.

In 1875, he ran on the Republican ticket for New York State Comptroller but was defeated by Democrat Lucius Robinson. He moved south, and for some years he lived in camp at Pablo Beach, Florida, where he lived a vigorous outdoor life, and also took up the study of Greek. He was survived by one of his three daughters.

== Death and legacy ==
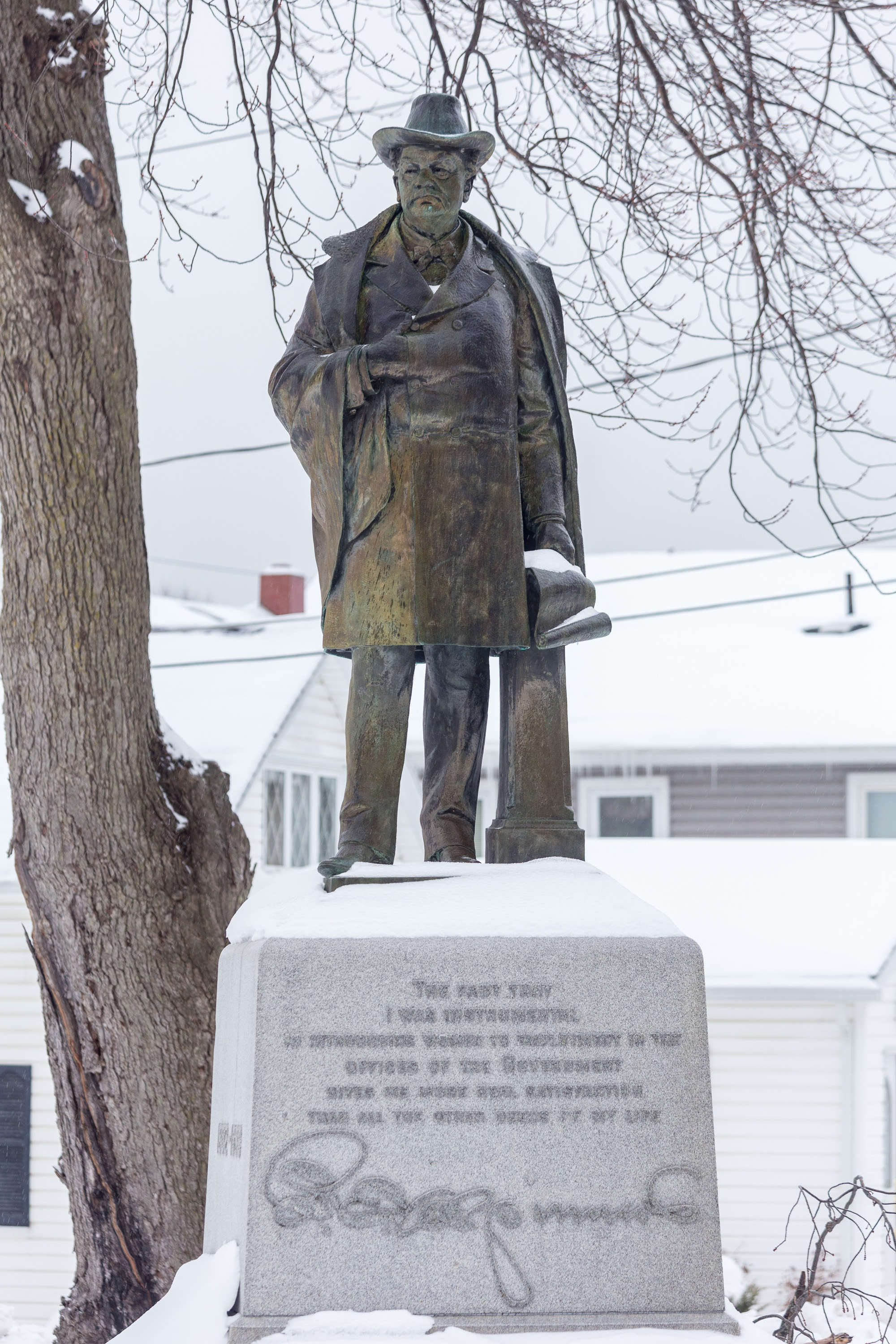
Francis E. Spinner (1894, installed 1909) by Henry Jackson Ellicott. The base prominently features Spinner's signature.

Spinner was buried at the Mohawk Cemetery, in Mohawk, New York.

Following Spinner's death, sculptor Henry Jackson Ellicott was commissioned to create a bronze statue of him. A group of women who worked in the Treasury Department contributed $10,000 toward the monument's $20,000 cost. It was completed in 1894, but never installed in front of the U.S. Treasury Building in Washington, D.C. Following years in storage, the Herkimer chapter of the Daughters of the American Revolution petitioned for the statue to be transferred to his home town. On June 29, 1909, the bronze statue was unveiled "with impressive ceremonies" in Herkimer's Myers Park. "[S]aid to be a very good likeness," the 7.5 ft (2.3 m) "splendid piece of bronze" faces Spinner's birthplace. The statue's base bears a likeness of his famous signature, which was then well-known from its appearance on U.S. Treasury notes. The inscription reads:

The fact that I was instrumental in introducing women to employment in the offices of the government gives me more real satisfaction than all the other deeds of my life.

== Sources ==
- United States Congress. "Francis E. Spinner (id: S000737)". Biographical Directory of the United States Congress.
- This article incorporates text from a publication now in the public domain: Wilson, J. G.; Fiske, J., eds. (1900). "Spinner, Francis Elias" . Appletons' Cyclopædia of American Biography. New York: D. Appleton.
- This article incorporates text from a publication now in the public domain: Rines, George Edwin, ed. (1920). "Spinner, Francis Elias" . Encyclopedia Americana.
- Gilman, D. C.; Peck, H. T.; Colby, F. M., eds. (1905). "Spinner, Francis Elias" . New International Encyclopedia (1st ed.). New York: Dodd, Mead.

U.S. House of Representatives
Preceded by Bishop Perkins	Member of the U.S. House of Representatives from New York's 17th congressional district 1855–1861	Succeeded by Socrates N. Sherman
Government offices
Preceded by William C. Price	Treasurer of the United States; March 16, 1861 – July 30, 1875	Succeeded by John C. New
