= Lucien Anderson =

American politician

Lucien Anderson (Note: Anderson's first name is spelled "Lucian" on his gravestone, as indicated in the photo on his Find A Grave memorial. Other sources, including his official Congressional biography, spell it "Lucien".)
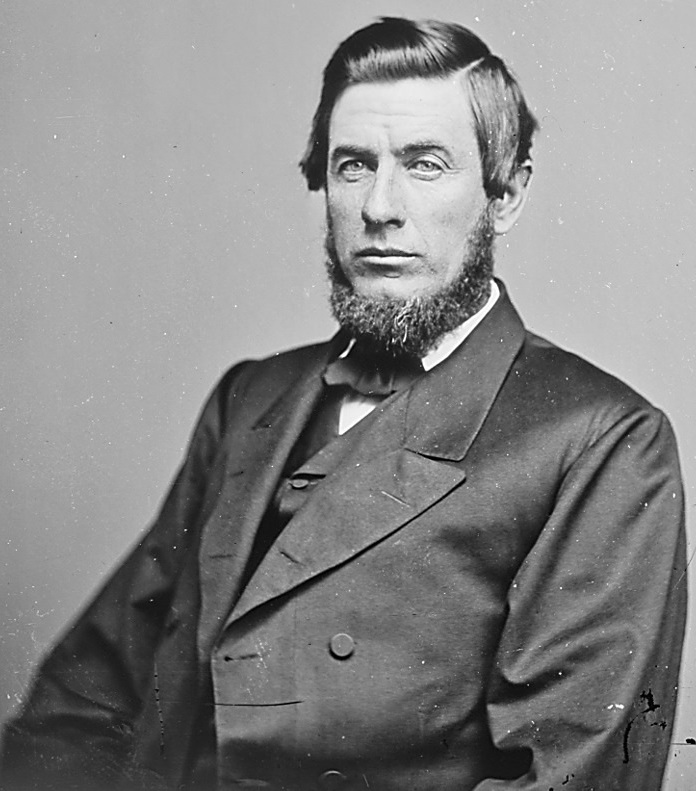

Member of the U.S. House of Representatives from Kentucky's 1st district
- In office March 4, 1863 – March 3, 1865
- Preceded by: Samuel L. Casey
- Succeeded by: Lawrence S. Trimble

Member of the Kentucky House of Representatives from Graves County
- In office August 6, 1855 – August 3, 1857
- Preceded by: Alexander H. Willingham
- Succeeded by: Samuel F. Morse

Personal details
- Born: June 23, 1824 Fleming County, Kentucky, US
- Died: October 18, 1898 (aged 74) Mayfield, Kentucky, US
- Party: Whig (before 1857); Union Democratic (1863–64); Unconditional Union (1864–65)
- Profession: Lawyer; Politician

Lucien Anderson (June 23, 1824 – October 18, 1898) was a Unionist slave owner and United States Representative from Kentucky.

== Biography ==
Anderson was born near Mayfield, Kentucky. The spelling of his first name is disputed; his official Congressional biography and many contemporaneous accounts spelled it, "Lucien," but some modern biographers claim the original spelling was, "Lucian."

He attended the public schools and studied law. In 1845, he was admitted to the bar and commenced practice in Mayfield. He served in local office including Graves County Attorney.

Anderson served as a Presidential Elector on the Whig ticket of Winfield Scott and William A. Graham in 1852. He served as a member of the Kentucky House of Representatives from 1855 to 1857

He was elected as Union Democrat to the Thirty-eighth Congress, but once in office emerged as a leader of the new Unconditional Union Party, which favored the abolition of slavery. Shortly following his election, he was kidnapped by Confederate sympathizers, but then released in a prisoner swap for some Confederate prisoners. While in Congress, he advocated for the emancipation of all slaves and voted for the 13th Amendment to the US Constitution, despite having been a slave-owner, possibly even at the time of his voting for the Amendment.

He declined to be a candidate for renomination in 1864. He served as a delegate to the 1864 National Union Convention that nominated Abraham Lincoln for re-election.

After leaving Congress, Anderson resumed the practice of law. Near the end of his life he was judged to be of unsound mind as the result of his age and ill health, and a trustee was appointed to manage his affairs. He died in Mayfield, Kentucky, on October 17, 1898.

== Notes ==
U.S. House of Representatives
Preceded by Samuel L. Casey	Member of the U.S. House of Representatives from Kentucky's 1st congressional district March 4, 1863 – March 3, 1865	Succeeded by Lawrence S. Trimble
