= Charles K. Wheeler =

American politician (1863–1933)

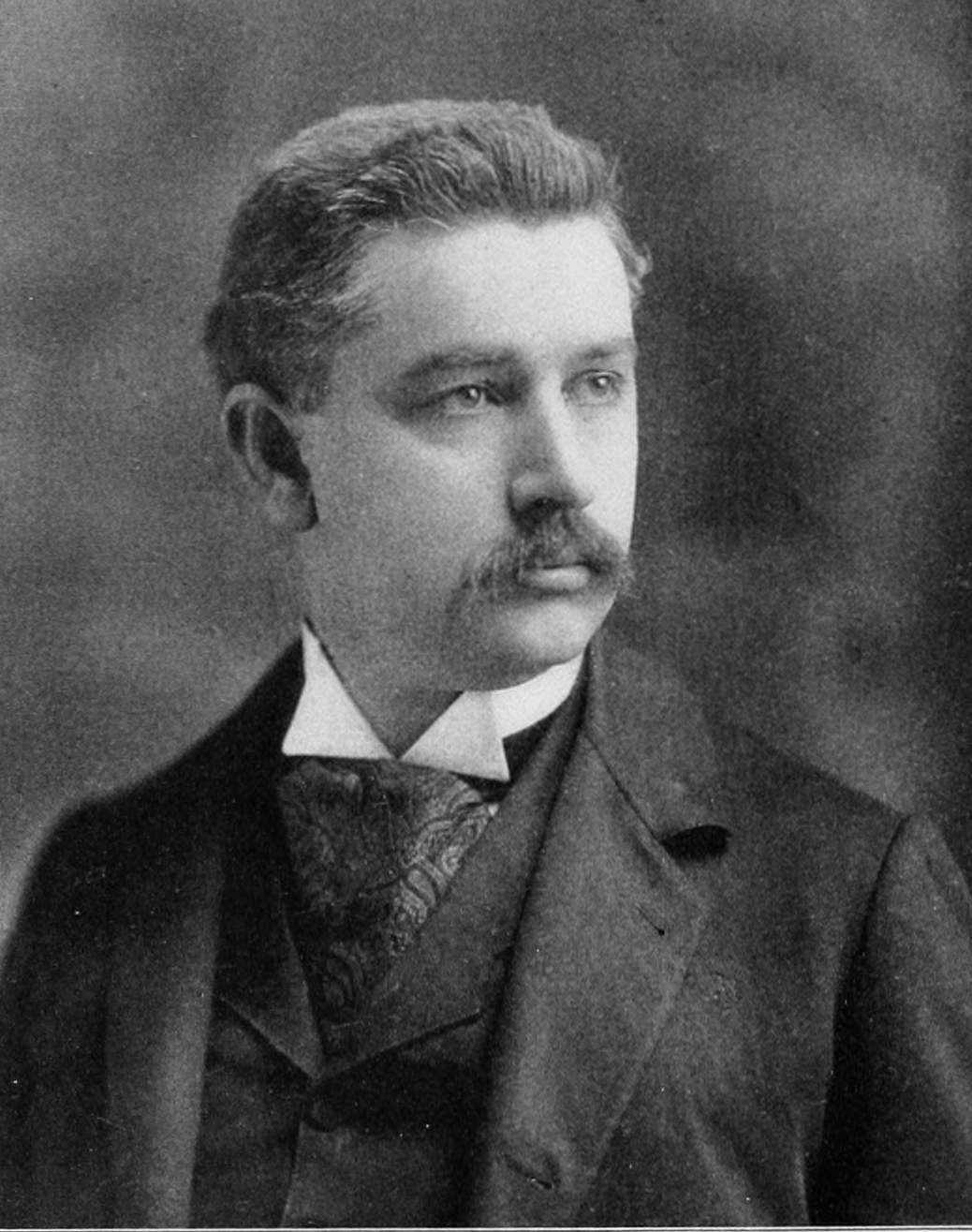

Member of the U.S. House of Representatives from Kentucky's 1st district
- In office March 4, 1897 – March 3, 1903
- Preceded by: John Kerr Hendrick
- Succeeded by: Ollie Murray James

Personal details
- Born: April 18, 1863 Christian County, Kentucky
- Died: June 15, 1933 (aged 70) Paducah, Kentucky
- Resting place: Oak Grove Cemetery
- Party: Democratic
- Spouse: Mary Kirkpatrick Guthrie
- Education: Rhodes College; Cumberland University
- Profession: Lawyer

Charles Kennedy Wheeler (April 18, 1863 – June 15, 1933) was a U.S. representative from Kentucky.

== Early life and family ==
Charles K. Wheeler was born near Hopkinsville in Christian County, Kentucky. He was the youngest of twelve children born to Dr. James and Elizabeth (Watkins) Wheeler. His father was a doctor who immigrated from England around 1830.

Wheeler received his early education from a private tutor. At age seventeen, he graduated from Southwestern University in Clarksville, Tennessee (now Rhodes College in Memphis, Tennessee). He then studied law at Cumberland University in Lebanon, Tennessee, graduating in 1880. He was admitted to the bar the same year through the enactment of a special grant by the State legislature and commenced practice in Paducah, Kentucky.

On October 10, 1888, Wheeler married Mary Kirkpatrick Guthrie. The couple had four children – James Guthrie Wheeler and Mary Wheeler, Charlotte Wheeler, and Margaret Wheeler.

== Political career ==
Wheeler was known as an outstanding orator, and frequently campaigned on behalf of Democratic candidates for office. He served as an assistant presidential elector for his party in the presidential elections of 1884 and 1888 and was the elector for the First District in 1892. In 1892, he was elected city solicitor of Paducah, serving until 1896.

Wheeler was elected to represent the First District in the U.S. House of Representatives. He served in the Fifty-fifth, Fifty-sixth, and Fifty-seventh Congresses (March 4, 1897 – March 3, 1903). Wheeler secured significant appropriations for projects in his district, including the expansion of a federal courthouse in Paducah and the protection of a local ice harbor. He used his influence as a member of the Naval Affairs Committee to secure the naming of the USS Paducah. He was later chosen to give the presentation address when the city of Paducah presented a silver service for use on the ship. The Paducah Company of the Kentucky State Guard adopted the name "The Wheeler Guard" in his honor.

When the British tried to prevent U.S. involvement in the Cuban War of Independence and enlisted American citizens for service in the Second Boer War, Wheeler criticized the administration of Republican President Theodore Roosevelt, particularly Secretary of State John Hay, for bringing the country to "this humiliating condition". He vehemently opposed U.S. efforts to purchase the Philippines from Spain for the sum of $20 million. In 1902, he made national headlines by criticizing an official reception for Prince Henry of Prussia and the attendance of Alice Roosevelt at the coronation of King Edward VII as "flunkeyism" and "toadyism". His comments drew mixed reaction from the press, but President Theodore Roosevelt cancelled his daughters trip to King Edward's coronation as a result.

== Later life and death ==
Wheeler did not seek renomination to Congress in 1902. He desired election to the U.S. Senate, but was never seriously considered as a candidate by the state legislature. Following his tenure in Congress, he returned to Paducah and started a law firm with D. H. Hughes and W. A. Berry. Among those who studied in the firm was a young Alben Barkley, who would later become Vice-President of the United States. Wheeler campaigned on Barkley's behalf when Barkley sought election to Wheeler's old congressional seat in 1912.

In 1913, Wheeler became a charter member and first president of the Paducah Country Club. He was involved in several civic organizations and a member of the Grace Episcopal Church.

He died in Paducah on June 15, 1933, and was interred in Oak Grove Cemetery.

U.S. House of Representatives
Preceded by Charles K. Wheeler	Member of the U.S. House of Representatives from Kentucky's 1st congressional district 1897–1903	Succeeded by Alben W. Barkley
