= Lawrence S. Trimble =

American politician

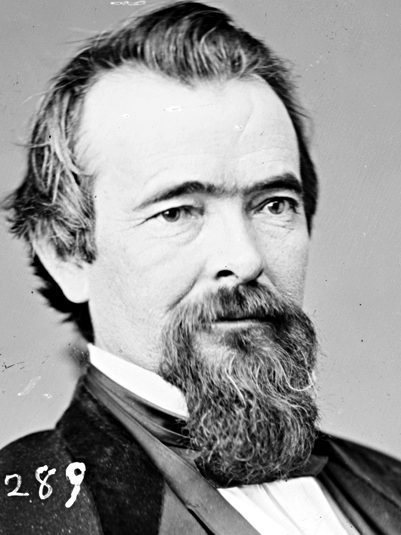

Member of the U.S. House of Representatives from Kentucky's 1st district
- In office March 4, 1865 – March 3, 1871
- Preceded by: Lucien Anderson
- Succeeded by: Edward Crossland

Judge of the Kentucky 1st Judicial District Equity and Criminal Court
- In office 1856–1860

Member of the Kentucky House of Representatives
- In office 1851–1853

Personal details
- Born: Lawrence Strother Trimble; August 26, 1825 Fleming County, Kentucky
- Died: August 9, 1904 (aged 78) Albuquerque, New Mexico
- Resting place: Fairview Cemetery
- Party: Democratic
- Profession: Lawyer; Judge; Railroad executive State legislator

Lawrence Strother Trimble (August 26, 1825 – August 9, 1904) was a United States congressman from Kentucky, a Kentucky judge, and New Mexican politician and lawyer.

Trimble was born in Fleming County, Kentucky to the farming family of James and Harriet (Triplett) Trimble. He completed preparatory studies and later studied law there, and was admitted to the bar there at the age of 22. In 1847, he moved to Paducah, opened a law practice and entered politics. He served as a representative in Kentucky's legislature from 1851 to 1853. Trimble was a slave-holder up to the Civil War. He was elected as a judge for the equity and criminal court in the First Judicial District of Kentucky in 1856 and served until 1860. From 1860 until 1865 he was president of the New Orleans & Ohio Railroad Company.

Trimble served three consecutive terms in the U.S. House of Representatives from 1865 to 1870 as a Democrat for the 1st Congressional District of Kentucky. He was one of the 47 representatives who voted against the impeachment of Andrew Johnson in 1868. In 1870, he failed to receive the Democratic party nomination from his district for congress.

In 1879, Trimble moved to Albuquerque, New Mexico, where he continued the practice of law and again entered politics. He was the only Democrat elected to the New Mexico Constitutional Convention of 1889 where he represented Bernalillo County and gave the opening address. After the convention he retired to his ranch. Trimble died in Albuquerque, August 9, 1904, and was buried in the Fairview Cemetery off of Yale Boulevard.

== Notes ==
U.S. House of Representatives
Preceded by Lucien Anderson	Member of the U.S. House of Representatives from Kentucky's 1st congressional district March 4, 1865 – March 3, 1871	Succeeded by Edward Crossland
