= Oscar Turner (1825–1896) =

American politician and lawyer (1825–1896)

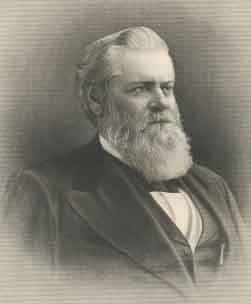

Member of the U.S. House of Representatives from Kentucky's 1st district
- In office March 4, 1879 – March 3, 1885
- Preceded by: Andrew Boone
- Succeeded by: William Johnson Stone

Member of the Kentucky Senate from the 2nd district
- In office August 5, 1867 – August 7, 1871
- Preceded by: J. M. Bigger
- Succeeded by: Jesse C. Gilbert

Personal details
- Born: February 3, 1825 New Orleans, Louisiana, U.S.
- Died: January 22, 1896 (aged 70) Louisville, Kentucky, U.S.
- Resting place: Cave Hill Cemetery; Louisville, Kentucky, U.S.
- Party: Independent Democrat; Democrat
- Education: Transylvania University
- Profession: Lawyer

Oscar Turner (February 3, 1825 – January 22, 1896) was a U.S. representative from Kentucky, father of Oscar Turner.

Born in New Orleans, Louisiana, Turner moved with his parents to Fayette County, Kentucky, in 1826. He completed preparatory studies. He moved to Ballard County, Kentucky, in 1843. He was graduated from the law department of Transylvania University, Lexington, Kentucky, in 1847. Commonwealth attorney 1851–1855. He was admitted to the bar and practiced until 1861. He represented the 2nd district of the Kentucky Senate from 1867 to 1871, which comprised Ballard, Marshall, and McCracken Counties.

Turner was elected as an Independent Democrat to the Forty-sixth Congress, as a Democrat to the Forty-seventh Congress, and as an Independent Democrat to the Forty-eighth Congress (March 4, 1879 – March 3, 1885). He resumed the practice of law. He died in Louisville, Kentucky, on January 22, 1896. He was interred in Cave Hill Cemetery.

U.S. House of Representatives
Preceded by Andrew Boone	Member of the U.S. House of Representatives from Kentucky's 1st congressional district March 4, 1879 – March 3, 1885	Succeeded by William J. Stone
