= Thomas William Hodgson Crosland =

British author, poet and journalist

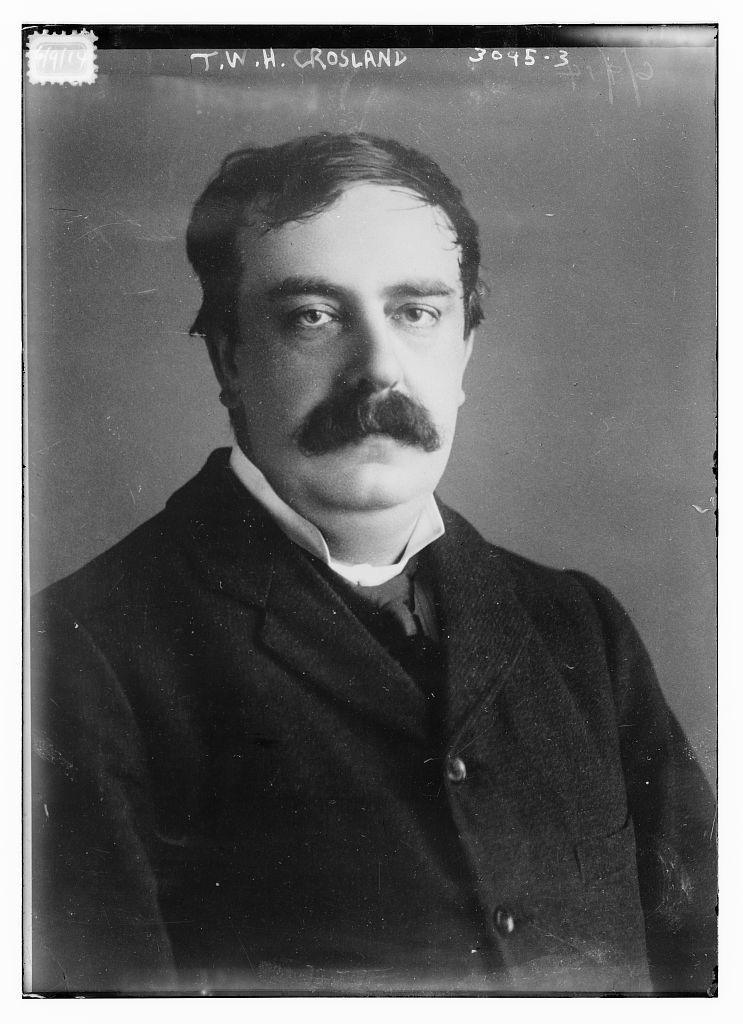

Thomas William Hodgson Crosland (21 July 1865 – 23 December 1924) was a British author, poet and journalist.

== Biography ==
Crosland was born in Leeds in 1865, the son of Methodist New Connexion preacher and superintendent of the Prudential Assurance Company William Crosland (son of cloth manufacturer Thomas Crosland, of Isles House, Holbeck, Leeds) and Hannah, daughter of farmer John Hodgson.

He was an associate and friend of Lord Alfred Douglas, who was Oscar Wilde's lover. The bitter feud between Lord Alfred's father the Marquess of Queensberry and his son resulted in Wilde suing the Marquess for libel at Douglas's urging. Subsequently, Wilde was charged with homosexuality after the Marquess produced evidence of Wilde's behaviour as justifying the libel. In 1895 Wilde was found guilty and imprisoned. After the trial Crosland united with Douglas, who had become a pious Catholic, and together they persecuted Robbie Ross in the civil courts in a variety of actions. They also repeatedly wrote and visited the police and the Director of Public Prosecutions, trying to ensure Ross's arrest for homosexual offences.

In 1913 the author Arthur Ransome recalled "the rather endearing story of his (Crosland's) first arrival in London from Yorkshire, by road, pushing a perambulator that was shared by manuscripts and a baby". This was at the trial of Ransome and others for libelling Douglas in Ransome's 1912 book on Wilde; Crosland and the impecunious Douglas had hoped for substantial damages but lost. When Douglas was declared bankrupt in February 1913, his solicitor had informed the court that damages of £2,500 "a fortune", were expected, which alarmed Ransome when he saw it in The Times. The judge was rather scathing about Douglas's behaviour in the box, and the jury found that the words complained of were a libel but were true. Ransome's biographer referred to Crosland as a "shady associate" of Douglas, and Ross's biographer calls him "a narrow-minded bigot" and a "right-wing Tory". Crosland wrote a condemnation of Wilde's De Profundis, in verse, titled The First Stone, in 1912, and ghost-wrote Douglas's memoir Oscar Wilde and Myself in 1914.

In 1914, Robbie Ross, Oscar Wilde's literary executor and rival for Wilde's affection, charged Crosland with criminal libel, plus writs for criminal conspiracy and perjury against Douglas and Crosland jointly. Crosland was found not guilty, though the judge did say that acquittal would not imply that Ross was guilty of any offence.

== Personal life ==
Crosland was a humanitarian who frequently wrote in his poems about the impoverished and sick and unemployed, especially caring about returned soldiers in the First World War. In 1894 he married Annie Moore. They had three sons: William Philip; John Jordan; and Laurence Oldmeadow. After many illnesses, he died in Surrey in 1924, survived by his wife and their son John. John Crosland was father of the journalist Philip Crosland.

A biography, The life and genius of T. W. H. Crosland, by W. Sorley Brown was published in 1928.

== Publications ==
- The Unspeakable Scot (1902)
- The Egregious English (1903)
- The Truth about Japan (1904)
- The Wild Irishman (1905)
- The Suburbans (1905)
- Taffy Was A Welshman (1912)
- The First Stone: On Reading the Unpublished Parts of 'De Profundis' (1912)
- The collected poems of T.W.H. Crosland (1917)
- The fine old Hebrew gentleman (1922)
