= William Johnson Stone =

American politician (1841–1923)

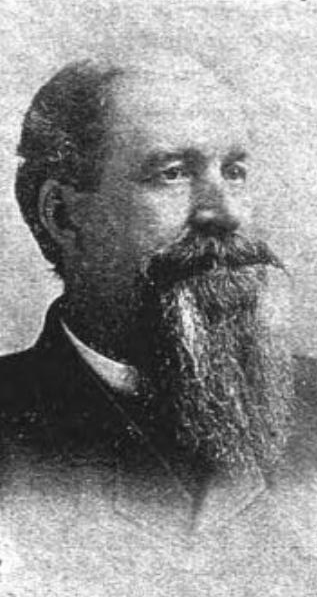
- Stone, c. 1900

Member of the U.S. House of Representatives from Kentucky's 1st district
- In office March 4, 1885 – March 3, 1895
- Preceded by: Oscar Turner
- Succeeded by: John Kerr Hendrick

Member of the Kentucky House of Representatives
- In office August 6, 1883 – March 3, 1885
- Preceded by: W. C. Holland
- Succeeded by: William M. Reed
- Constituency: Lyon and Marshall Counties
- In office August 2, 1875 – August 6, 1877
- Preceded by: Thomas J. Morrow (Note: As the representative from Caldwell and Lyon Counties.)
- Succeeded by: William M. Reed
- Constituency: Lyon and Marshall Counties
- In office August 5, 1867 – August 2, 1869
- Preceded by: Theodore Thompson (Note: As the representative from Livingston and Lyon Counties.)
- Succeeded by: P. M. Thurmond
- Constituency: Caldwell and Lyon Counties

Personal details
- Born: June 26, 1841 Kuttawa, Kentucky
- Died: March 12, 1923 (aged 81) Frankfort, Kentucky
- Resting place: New Bethel Cemetery
- Party: Democratic
- Occupation: Farmer, Merchant

Military service
- Allegiance: Confederate States of America
- Branch/service: Confederate States Army
- Rank: Captain
- Battles/wars: American Civil War

William Johnson Stone (June 26, 1841 – March 12, 1923) was a U.S. representative from Kentucky.

== Biography ==
He was born in Kuttawa, Caldwell (now Lyon) County, Kentucky on June 26, 1841. He attended the common schools and Q.M. Tyler's Collegiate Institute in Cadiz, Trigg County. Stone studied law. During the American Civil War he served as captain in the Confederate Army. After the war he engaged in agricultural pursuits. He was a member of the Kentucky House of Representatives in 1867, 1875, and 1883, serving as speaker in 1875.

He was elected as a Democrat to the Forty-ninth and to the four succeeding Congresses (March 4, 1885 – March 3, 1895): chairman, Committee on War Claims (Fiftieth Congress) He engaged in mercantile pursuits in Kuttawa, Lyon County; Confederate pension commissioner of Kentucky in 1912 and served until his death in Frankfort, Kentucky, March 12, 1923; interment in New Bethel Cemetery, Lyon County, Kentucky.

Throughout his political career, Stone was a vocal advocate for Confederate veterans, testifying on behalf of their right to receive pensions and ultimately winning his case.

== Notes ==
U.S. House of Representatives
Preceded by Oscar Turner	Member of the U.S. House of Representatives from Kentucky's 1st congressional district 1885–1895	Succeeded by John K. Hendrick
