= Philip Crosland =

English journalist (1918–2012)

- Born: 30 July 1918; Guildford, Surrey, United Kingdom
- Died: 14 July 2012 (aged 93)
- Known for: Journalist

Philip William John Crosland (30 July 1918 – 14 July 2012) was "one of the last of a group of British journalists to make a career working in the Indian national press."

== Life ==
Crosland was born in Guildford, Surrey, eldest of four children of John and Harriet Crosland. His paternal grandfather was the writer Thomas William Hodgson Crosland. He was educated at Kingston Grammar School. At 17 he was working as a junior reporter for the Essex Express and Independent, and in October 1938, when he was 20, joined the staff of The Statesman in Calcutta (now Kolkata), and was transferred to the Delhi office two months later.

After the outbreak of World War II, in November 1939, Crosland received an emergency commission as an officer in the 15th Punjab Regiment of the Indian Army. In May 1941 he was posted with the 2nd Battalion 15th Punjab Regiment to Kuching in Sarawak on the island of Borneo, where the battalion was to defend the landing ground. After the Japanese invasion of Borneo commenced in mid-December, the scorched earth policy was brought into play and Crosland assisted with the destruction of the oilfields at Miri and Seria and the landing ground at Kuching. When the Japanese arrived at Kuching on 24 December 1941, the Punjabis were ordered to withdraw into Dutch West Borneo to join forces with the Dutch troops there. Crosland commanded two platoons, and they joined up with the rest of the battalion at Sanggau on 29 December.

A period of fighting followed when the Dutch forces and the battalion tried to prevent the Japanese from reaching Singkawang II Aerodrome, but the attack came on 24 January 1942, and running out of both food and ammunition, the Commanding Officer ordered the battalion to withdraw to the south Borneo coast. Ten weeks of arduous trekking through deep jungle followed. The battalion finally surrendered at Kumai in April 1942.

Along with the remnants of the 2/15th battalion, Crosland was incarcerated in several POW camps: Tanjung Priok at Batavia (now Jakarta) in Java, which they left on 22 September 1942 for Singapore. After about two weeks in Singapore they reached Batu Lintang camp in Kuching on 13 October 1942, where they were to spend the rest of the war, housed in the very army barracks that had been built for the 2/15th Punjabis before the invasion. The camp was liberated in September 1945.

Crosland returned to work at The Statesman at Calcutta in June 1946. In September 1955, he was appointed News Editor for the Delhi edition of the paper. He became Resident Editor in April 1962, then was transferred back to Calcutta as Deputy Editor in August 1963, and in March 1965 he was appointed Chief Administrative Officer. He also wrote for papers such as the Montreal Star, the New Zealand Herald, The Age (Melbourne), The Times and The Observer, sometimes under the pseudonym Jonathan Swayne.

Crosland returned to England in 1967 to be with his family. He worked for the Central Office of Information and on the editorial staff of the Surrey Advertiser. He finally retired from journalism at the age of 80. A contribution by Crosland was included in the 2010 publication Sahibs Who Loved India, edited by Khushwant Singh.

== Personal life ==
Crosland married Joy Shaw in 1946, and they had a son and a daughter. His wife predeceased him in 2007.
