= Edward Crossland =

American politician (1827–1881)

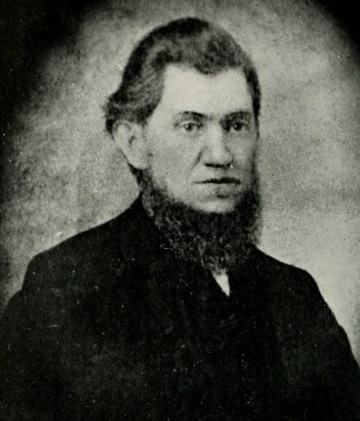
- From the August 1911 edition of Confederate Veteran magazine.

Member of the U.S. House of Representatives from Kentucky's 1st district
- In office March 4, 1871 – March 3, 1875
- Preceded by: Lawrence S. Trimble
- Succeeded by: Andrew Boone

Member of the Kentucky House of Representatives from Fulton and Hickman Counties
- In office August 3, 1857 – August 1, 1859
- Preceded by: Richard B. Alexander
- Succeeded by: William D. Lanham

Personal details
- Born: June 30, 1827 Hickman County, Kentucky, U.S.
- Died: September 11, 1881 (aged 54) near Mayfield, Kentucky
- Resting place: Maplewood Cemetery in Mayfield, Kentucky
- Party: Democratic
- Profession: Lawyer; Sheriff; Judge; Politician

Military service
- Allegiance: Confederate States of America
- Branch/service: Confederate States Army
- Years of service: 1861–1865
- Rank: Colonel
- Unit: 7th Kentucky Cavalry
- Commands: Crossland's Brigade of Forrest's Cavalry Corps
- Battles/wars: American Civil War: Battle of Dranesville; Battle of Nashville; Battle of Franklin; Third Battle of Murfreesboro; Battle of Selma

Edward Crossland (June 30, 1827 – September 11, 1881) was a Confederate army officer in the American Civil War and later a United States representative from Kentucky. He commanded a brigade of cavalry in the Western Theater and served in several battles.

Crossland was born in Hickman County, Kentucky, to Samuel Crossland and his wife Elizabeth Harry. He studied law and was admitted to the bar in 1852. He began his practice at Clinton, Kentucky, and also served as sheriff of Hickman County in 1851 and 1852. Crossland was member of the Kentucky House of Representatives in 1857 and 1858.

In 1861, at the beginning of the Civil War, he became a captain in the Confederate Army's 1st Kentucky Infantry Regiment. He went to Northern Virginia with his regiment, and in December 1861 they fought in the Battle of Dranesville under J. E. B. Stuart. The regiment was then assigned to the Army of Northern Virginia, where it served until its one-year enlistment expired. Crossland had by then become a lieutenant colonel.

Following his discharge, Crossland was elected colonel of the 7th Kentucky Infantry Regiment and served with them in Mississippi. In 1864, the 7th Kentucky Infantry was mounted and assigned to Maj. Gen. Hylan B. Lyon's Brigade of Gen. Nathan Bedford Forrest's Cavalry Corps. Crossland served under Forrest until the war's end in May 1865. His last battle was at Selma, Alabama, on April 2, 1865.

In August 1867, Crossland was elected judge of the court of common pleas of the first judicial district of Kentucky for the term of six years. However, he resigned his office on November 1, 1870.

He was elected as a Democrat to the Forty-second and Forty-third Congresses (March 4, 1871 – March 3, 1875). He then left Congress and practiced law in Mayfield, Kentucky. In August 1880, he was again elected judge of the circuit court for the first judicial district of Kentucky, and served until his death the following year at the age of 54. He was survived by his wife and five of their thirteen children.

Crossland was buried in Maplewood Cemetery in Mayfield, Kentucky.

Crossland, Kentucky is named for him.

U.S. House of Representatives
Preceded by Lawrence S. Trimble	Member of the U.S. House of Representatives from Kentucky's 1st congressional district March 4, 1871 – March 3, 1875	Succeeded by Andrew Boone
