= Crossland, Kentucky =

Unincorporated community in Kentucky, United States

- Unincorporated community
- Location within the state of Kentucky Crossland (the United States)
- Coordinates: 36°30′2″N 88°22′49″W
- Country: United States
- State: Kentucky
- County: Calloway
- Elevation: 587 ft (179 m)
- Time zone: UTC-6 (Central (CST))
  - Summer (DST): UTC-5 (CST)
- GNIS feature ID: 490399

Crossland is an unincorporated community in Calloway County, Kentucky, United States. The town is on the Kentucky-Tennessee state line and was named for Edward Crossland who was a local judge at the time. The town had a post office from March 28, 1868, until 1925.
