= Caseyville, Kentucky =

Unincorporated community in Kentucky, United States

- Unincorporated community
- Location within Kentucky
- Coordinates: 37°32′16″N 88°03′51″W
- Country: United States
- State: Kentucky
- County: Union
- Elevation: 367 ft (112 m)
- Time zone: UTC-6 (Central (CST))
  - Summer (DST): UTC-5 (CDT)
- Area code: 270
- GNIS feature ID: 489053

Caseyville is an unincorporated community in Union County, Kentucky, United States. Caseyville is located on the Ohio River and Kentucky Route 1508, 4.5 miles (7.2 km) west of Sturgis.

During the Civil War, many of Caseyville's residents were Confederate sympathizers, and Confederate troops used the community as a base during skirmishes in October 1862. After the Confederates seized a Union steamboat, Union troops at Battery Rock entered into a standoff with the troops at Caseyville. The Confederates eventually left the town, and the Union Army entered the city; after temporarily arresting every male resident of the town and charging a fee for damages to the steamer, the army mandated that the town bar Confederate troops from entering.
