= Oscar Turner (1867–1902) =

American politician (1867–1902)

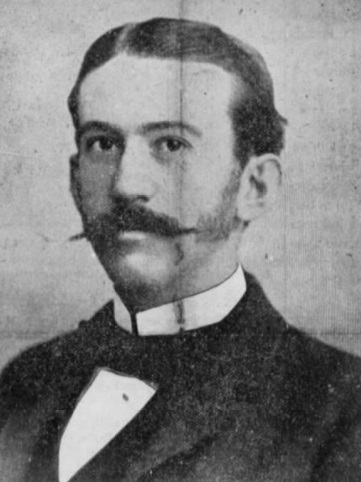
- Kentucky Irish American (Louisville, KY), October 1, 1898

Member of the U.S. House of Representatives from Kentucky's 5th district
- In office March 4, 1899 – March 3, 1901
- Preceded by: Walter Evans
- Succeeded by: Harvey S. Irwin

Personal details
- Born: October 19, 1867 Woodville, Kentucky, U.S.
- Died: July 17, 1902 (aged 34) Louisville, Kentucky, U.S.
- Resting place: Cave Hill Cemetery; Louisville, Kentucky, U.S.
- Party: Democratic
- Spouse: Mary Jane Caldwell (m. 1901)
- Children: 1
- Parent(s): Caroline (Gardner) Turner; Oscar Turner
- Relatives: Winthrop Sargent (great-grandfather); Edward Turner (grand-uncle); Ben F. Caldwell (father in law)
- Education: University of Louisville (attended); University of Virginia School of Law (LL.B., 1886)
- Profession: Attorney; politician

Oscar Turner (October 19, 1867 – July 17, 1902) was an American attorney and politician from Kentucky. A Democrat, he was most notable for his service in the United States House of Representatives from 1899 to 1901.

== Biography ==
Oscar Turner was born at Woodlands, his father's farm near Woodville, Kentucky, on October 19, 1867. He was the son of Caroline (Gardner) Turner and Oscar Turner, who served in Congress from 1879 to 1885. Turner's great-grandfather was Winthrop Sargent, who served as governor of Mississippi Territory. Edward Turner, who served as an associate justice of the Supreme Court of Mississippi, was his grand-uncle.

Turner attended the public schools of Ballard County and Washington, D.C., as well as the Louisville Rugby School in Louisville, Kentucky. He studied law at the University of Louisville, then at the University of Virginia School of Law, from which he graduated in 1886. Having graduated at nineteen, Turner did not meet the minimum age required to practice law (twenty-one), so he furthered his education with extensive travel before attaining admission to the bar in 1891 and beginning to practice in Louisville. In addition to practicing law, Turner was active in several business ventures, to include mines in Mexico, a Dallas, Texas, book publishing firm, and real estate including farms and timberland.

A Democrat, in 1898, Turner was elected to the United States House of Representatives. He served in the Fifty-sixth Congress (March 4, 1899, to March 3, 1901). He declined to run for a second term in 1900 and resumed the practice of law in 1901.

In July 1902, Turner became ill while on board a train near Dallas, where he was traveling for business. Turner was hospitalized at St. Paul Sanitarium in Dallas, but refused heart surgery and asked to be taken home. He traveled to Louisville by train but did not recover. Turner died at "Melrose", his home in the Crescent Hill section of Louisville, on July 17, 1902. He was interred at Cave Hill Cemetery in Louisville.

== Family ==
In 1901, Turner married Mary Jane Caldwell, the daughter of Ben F. Caldwell. They were the parents of a son, also named Oscar Turner, who was born on May 3, 1902, and died on June 13, 1975. In 1909, Turner's widow married William Norman Cottrell (1870–1916), a Chicago attorney and judge.

U.S. House of Representatives
Preceded by Walter Evans	Member of the U.S. House of Representatives from Kentucky's 5th congressional district March 4, 1899 – March 3, 1901	Succeeded by Harvey S. Irwin
