= 1862–63 United States House of Representatives elections =

House elections for the 38th U.S. Congress

- June 2, 1862– November 3, 1863 (Note: Regular elections only; excluding specials and states admitted after the start of Congress.)

All 183 seats (Note: Including late elections.) (Note: An additional 58 seats were vacant as a result of secession.) in the United States House of Representatives 92 seats needed for a majority
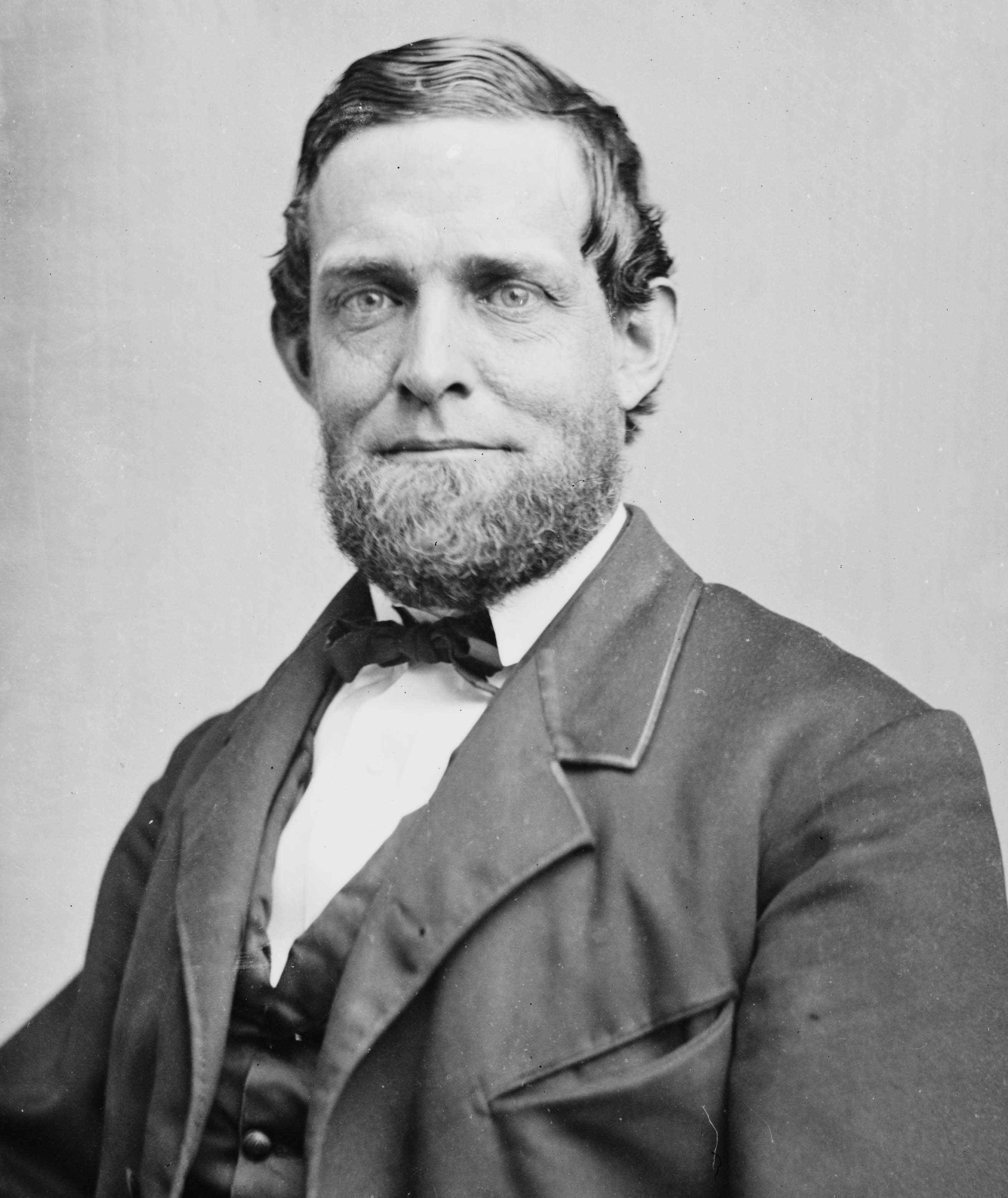

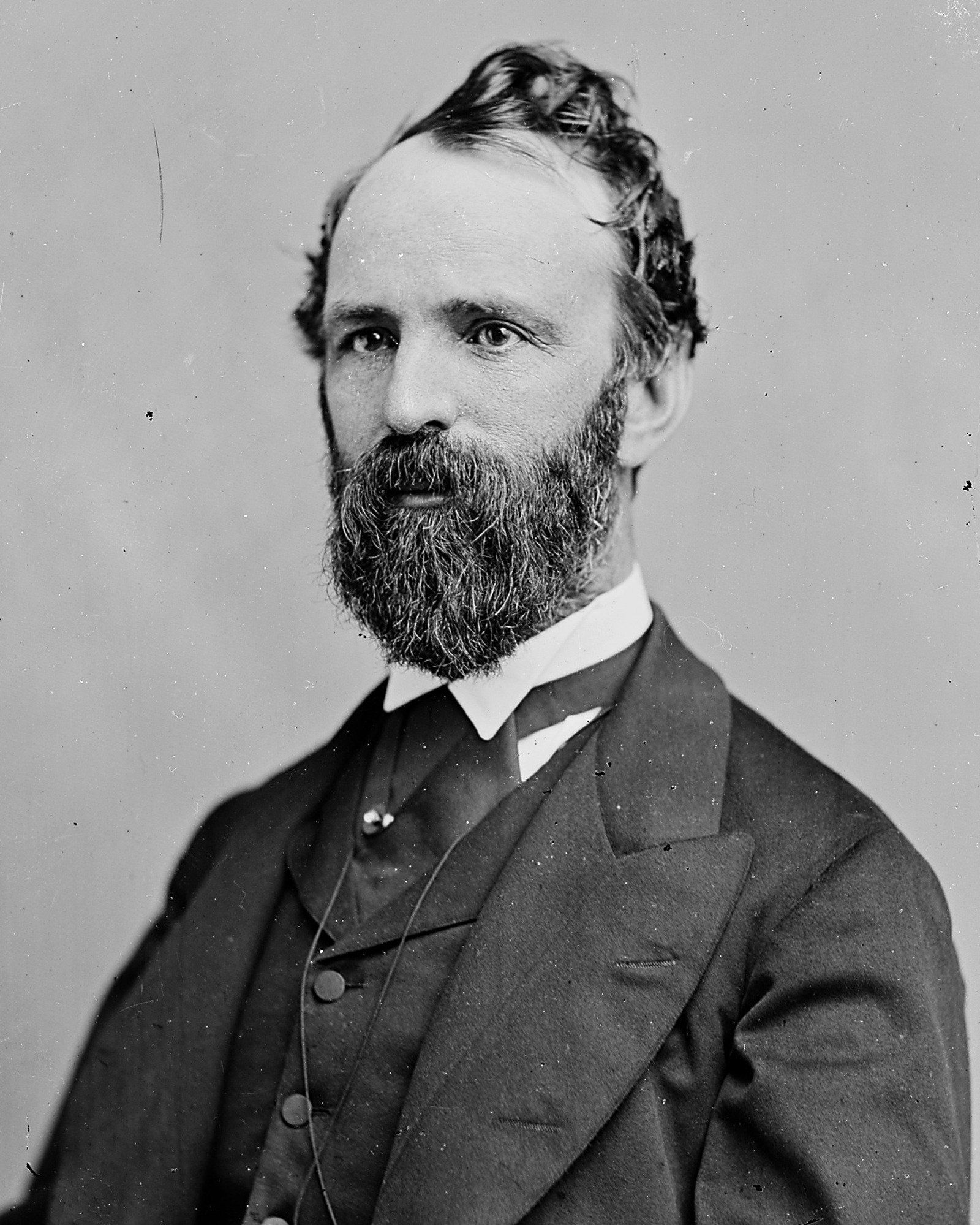
	First party	Second party
Leader	Schuyler Colfax	Samuel Cox
Party	Union	Democratic
Alliance	Republican–Union	—
Leader's seat	Indiana 9th	Ohio 7th
Last election	121 seats, 49.98% (Note: This includes votes for the Unionist Party in Maryland and the People's Party in Delaware, which were subsumed into the National Union Party.)	43 seats, 40.91%
Seats won	98	73
Seat change	▼25	▲30
Popular vote	1,622,831 (Note: This includes 842,132 votes for National Unionists, and 41,969 votes for Emancipationists.)	1,440,408
Percentage	50.11%	44.48%
Swing	▲0.13 pp	▲3.57 pp
	Third party	Fourth party
Party	Union Democratic	Conservative Union
Last election	9 seats, 2.45% (Note: This is based on the Unionist vote in Kentucky in the 1860-1861 election cycle.)	Pre-creation
Seats won	8	1
Seat change	▼1	▲1
Popular vote	60,840	9,937
Percentage	1.88%	0.31%
Swing	▼0.57 pp	New party
	Fifth party	Sixth party
Party	Unconditional Union Democratic	Independent
Last election	Pre-creation	1 seat (Note: Including 1 Independent Democrat, James E. Kerrigan, elected from New York's 4th congressional district), 1.87%
Seats won	1	2 (Note: Including 1 Independent Unionist and 1 War Democrat)
Seat change	▲1	▲1
Popular vote	6,936	33,580 (Note: Including all votes for Independents, Independent Democrats, Independent Unionists, Independent Union Democrats, Peace Democrats, and War Democrats)
Percentage	0.21%	1.04%
Swing	New party	▼0.83 pp
- Results; Democratic gain Union gain Republican gain Democratic hold Union hold Republican hold Union Democratic hold Emancipation gain Independent gain Conservative Union gain Unconditional Union Democratic gain
Speaker before election
Galusha A. Grow
Republican
Elected Speaker
Schuyler Colfax
Republican–Union

The 1862–63 United States House of Representatives elections were held between June 2, 1862, and November 3, 1863, to elect the 184 members and eight non-voting delegates of the House of Representatives. The Republican–Union coalition lost seats but retained an overall majority against the backdrop of the American Civil War.

In the first real test of opposition to the Lincoln administration, the Democratic Party made large gains in these and concurrent elections held in 1862 and 1863 but failed to take control of the House. Much of the campaign focussed on emancipation and Lincoln's handling of the war. Lincoln issued the preliminary Emancipation Proclamation on September 22, weeks before critical races in Indiana, Ohio, Pennsylvania, (October 14) and New York (November 3). Democrats denounced emancipation as tyrannical and a threat to white supremacy. Democratic election propaganda charged their opponents with bloodlust and religious fanaticism and made frequent appeals to anti-Black racism. While Radical Republicans defended the measure, others felt compelled to distance themselves from the president's policy. In Indiana and Ohio, the Union Party downplayed the slavery issue. The issue was particularly troublesome for Unionists in the border states. Kentucky's Union Democratic Party disavowed the proclamation ahead of congressional elections held in August 1863. In Maryland and Missouri, Unionists welcomed emancipation in principle but divided over questions over gradual versus immediate abolition and the enlistment of Black soldiers.

Other issues impacted the election, including Lincoln's suspension of habeas corpus, conscription, and the progress of the war. Inconclusive Union victories at Antietam, Corinth, and Perryville contributed to a perception that the administration's military strategy was ineffective. Democrats charged the administration with subordinating the restoration of the Union to the radical social policy of the abolitionist movement.

During this election, the Republican Party formed a coalition with War Democrats and border state unionists who supported the war effort. In most states, this coalition was known as the Union Party or as the Republican–Union Party. In parts of New England and the Upper Midwest, pro-administration candidates still called themselves Republicans. The Missouri Unionists were known as the Emancipation Party and split between Immediate and Gradual Emancipationists during this election. The Republican–Union coalition became the basis for the National Union Party which contested the next election.

While contemporary observers interpreted the elections as a "severe reproof" of the administration, the results of the elections were inconclusive. Democrats flipped more than 30 seats compared to the last election, while Republican–Unionists suffered serious losses across the Lower North. The strong showing for Union candidates in the border states, however, salvaged the Republican–Unionist majority. Among the defeated Republican–Unionists was the incumbent speaker of the House of Representatives Galusha A. Grow, who lost his Pennsylvania district to a Democratic challenger. This was the last election in which a sitting speaker of the House was defeated for re-election until 1994, when George Nethercutt defeated Tom Foley in Washington's 5th congressional district.

== Results ==
=== Federal ===
↓
73	12	98
Democratic	(Note: 8 Union Democrats, 1 Conservative Unionist, 1 Independent Unionist, 1 Unconditional Union Democrat, and 1 War Democrat were elected.)	Republican–Union

1862–63 United States House of Representatives elections (Note: Not including rejected elections in Arkansas, Louisiana, and Virginia)
Parties	Seats				Popular vote	
Parties	1860–61	1862–63	±	%	Votes	%
Union Party	12	56	▲44	30.60	1,134,687	35.40
Republican Party	108	36	▼72	19.67	412,647	12.87
Immediate Emancipation Party	0	4	▲4	2.18	25,328	0.79
Emancipation Party	0	1	▲1	0.55	14,415	0.45
Gradual Emancipation Party	0	1	▲1	0.55	4,901	0.15
Republican–Union coalition	120	98	▼22	53.55	1,591,978	49.66
Democratic Party	43	73	▲30	39.89	1,444,328	45.06
Union Democratic Party	9	8	▼1	4.37	59,550	1.86
Independent Republican–Unionists	0	1	▲1	0.55	15,519	0.48
War Democrats	0	1	▲1	0.55	13,255	0.41
Conservative Union Party	0	1	▲1	0.55	9,937	0.31
Unconditional Union Democratic Party	0	1	▲1	0.55	6,936	0.22
People's Party	0	0	Steady	0.00	45,285	1.41
Union Party (Kansas)	0	0	Steady	0.00	4,666	0.15
Independent Democrats	1	0	▼1	0.00	4,393	0.14
Peace Democrats	0	0	Steady	0.00	2,857	0.09
Independent Union Democrats	0	0	Steady	0.00	2,487	0.08
Others	7	0	▼7	0.00	4,506	0.14
Total	183	183	Steady	100.00	3,205,697	100.00

=== Results by state ===
State	Type	Date	Total seats		Democratic		Republican–Union (Note: Including: Outgoing: 108 Republicans, 12 Unionists, 1 People's; Incoming: 99 Republican–Unionists)		Others (Note: Including: Outgoing: 9 Union Democrats, 4 Constitutional Unionists, 1 Southern Rights, 1 Union and Peace; Incoming: 8 Union Democrats, 1 Conservative Unionist, 1 Unconditional Union Democrat)	
State	Type	Date	Seats	Change	Seats	Change	Seats	Change	Seats	Change
Oregon	At-large	June 2, 1862	1	Steady	0	▼1	1	▲1	0	Steady
Maine	Districts	September 8, 1862	5	▼1	1	▲1	4	▼2	0	Steady
Indiana	Districts	October 14, 1862	11	Steady	7	▲3	4	▼3	0	Steady
Iowa	Districts	October 14, 1862	6	▲4	0	Steady	6	▲4	0	Steady
Ohio	Districts	October 14, 1862	19	▼2	14	▲6	5	▼8	0	Steady
Pennsylvania	Districts	October 14, 1862	24	▼1	12 (Note: Including 1 War Democrat)	▲6	12 (Note: Including 1 Independent Unionist)	▼7	0	Steady
Delaware	At-large	November 1, 1862	1	Steady	1	▲1	0	▼1	0	Steady
Massachusetts	Districts	November 1, 1862	10	▼1	0	Steady	10	Steady	0	▼1 (Note: Constitutional Unionist)
Illinois	Mixed (Note: 13 single-member districts and one at-large seat)	November 4, 1862 (Election Day) (Note: In 1845, Congress passed a law providing for a uniform date for choosing presidential electors (see: Statutes at Large, 28th Congress, 2nd Session, p. 721). Congressional elections were unaffected by this law, but the date was gradually adopted by the states for congressional elections as well.)	14	▲5	9	▲4	5	▲1	0	Steady
Kansas	At-large	November 4, 1862 (Election Day)	1	Steady	0	Steady	1	Steady	0	Steady
Michigan	Districts	November 4, 1862 (Election Day)	6	▲2	1	▲1	5	▲1	0	Steady
Minnesota	Districts	November 4, 1862 (Election Day)	2	Steady	0	Steady	2	Steady	0	Steady
Missouri	Districts	November 4, 1862 (Election Day)	9	▲2	2	▼3	6	▲5	1 (Note: The incumbent Constitutional Unionist was re-elected as a Conservative Unionist.)	Steady
New Jersey	Districts	November 4, 1862 (Election Day)	5	Steady	4	▲1	1	▼1	0	Steady
New York	Districts	November 4, 1862 (Election Day)	31	▼2	17	▲7	14	▼9	0	Steady
Wisconsin	Districts	November 4, 1862 (Election Day)	6	▲3	3	▲3	3	Steady	0	Steady
Late elections (after the March 4, 1863 beginning of the term)
New Hampshire	Districts	March 10, 1863	3	Steady	1	▲1	2	▼1	0	Steady
Rhode Island	Districts	April 1, 1863	2	Steady	0	Steady	2	▲2	0	▼2 (Note: Constitutional Unionists)
Connecticut	Districts	April 6, 1863	4	Steady	1	▼1	3	▲1	0	Steady
Kentucky	Districts	August 3, 1863	9	▼1	0	Steady	0	Steady	9 (Note: 8 Union Democrats and 1 Unconditional Union Democrat)	▼1 (Note: Southern Rights)
Vermont	Districts	September 1, 1863	3	Steady	0	Steady	3	Steady	0	Steady
California	At-large	September 2, 1863	3	Steady	0	Steady	3	Steady	0	Steady
West Virginia	Districts	October 22, 1863	3	▲3	0	Steady	3	▲3	0	Steady
Maryland	Districts	November 3, 1863	5	▼1	1	▲1	4	▼1	0	▼1 (Note: Union and Peace)
Seceded states not holding elections
Alabama	Districts	None	6	▼1						
Arkansas	Districts	None	3	▲1						
Florida	At-large	None	1	Steady						
Georgia	Districts	None	7	▼1						
Louisiana	Districts	None	5	▲1						
Mississippi	Districts	None	5	Steady						
North Carolina	Districts	None	7	▼1						
South Carolina	Districts	None	4	▼2						
Tennessee	Districts	None	8	▼2				▼3		
Texas	Districts	None	4	▲2						
Virginia	Districts	None	11 (Note: Three seats were subsequently transferred to the new state of West Virginia.)	▼2				▼4		
Total			183	▲4	74	▲30	99	▼22	10	▼5
Total			58 Vacancies		40.4%		54.1%		5.5%	

Popular vote
Republican–Union	49.7%
Democratic	45.1%
Union Democratic	1.9%
People's	1.4%
Other	1.3%
Conservative Union	0.3%
Unconditional Union Democratic	0.2%
Union (Kansas)	0.2%

House seats
Republican–Union	53.6%
Democratic	39.9%
Union Democratic	4.4%
War Democrats	0.5%
Independent Unionists	0.5%
Conservative Union	0.5%
Unconditional Union Democratic	0.5%

=== Maps ===
Vacant seats filled by special elections in 1862

Seats elected in 1862

Seats elected in 1863

Winner's share of the popular vote

== Reapportionment ==
Reapportionment took place following the 1860 United States census. The 1862 apportionment act increased the size of the House to 241 seats from 233. Fifty-eight seats were vacant due to secession.

Three seats were transferred from Virginia to West Virginia following the latter's admission on June 20, 1863. One seat was allocated to Nevada upon its admission on October 31, 1864, increasing the size of the House to 242 seats and the number of elected members to 184.

== Special elections ==
Special elections were held in 1862 and 1863 to fill 12 vacancies in the 37th Congress and four vacancies in the 38th Congress.

=== 37th Congress ===
District	Incumbent			This race	
District	Member	Party	First elected	Results	Candidates
Missouri 5	John William Reid	Democratic	1860	Incumbent expelled December 2, 1861. New member elected January 6, 1862. Democratic hold.	▌ ✓ Thomas L. Price (Democratic) 78.33%; ▌George R. Smith (Unknown) 20.83%; Scattering 0.83%
Kentucky 1	Henry C. Burnett	Southern Rights	1855	Incumbent expelled December 3, 1861. New member elected January 20, 1862. Union Democratic gain.	▌ ✓ Samuel L. Casey (Union Democratic) 54.05%; ▌Lawrence S. Trimble (Peace Democratic) 44.16%; Scattering 1.80%
Virginia 1	Vacant (Note: Unionist Joseph Segar won the previous election for this seat, but was not seated by the House.)			Winner not seated February 11, 1862. Previous winner re-elected March 15, 1862. Union gain.	▌ ✓ Joseph Segar (Union) 54.91%; ▌Athur Watson (Unknown) 43.03%; Scattering 2.06%
Illinois 9	John A. Logan	Democratic	1858	Incumbent resigned April 2, 1862. New member elected May 6, 1862. Democratic hold.	▌ ✓ William J. Allen (Democratic) 35.65%; ▌Isham N. Haynie (Democratic) 30.14%; ▌Samuel S. Marshall (Democratic) 29.62%; Scattering 4.60%
Pennsylvania 7	Thomas B. Cooper	Democratic	1860	Incumbent died April 4, 1862. New member elected May 24, 1862. Democratic hold.	▌ ✓ John D. Stiles (Democratic) 51.64%; ▌George Lear (Republican) 48.36%
Maine 2	Charles W. Walton	Republican	1860	Incumbent resigned May 26, 1862. New member elected September 8, 1862. Republican hold.	▌ ✓ T. A. D. Fessenden (Republican) 53.70%; ▌Calvin Record (Democratic) 46.30%
Kentucky 2	James S. Jackson	Union; Democratic	1861	Incumbent resigned December 13, 1861. New member elected October 27, 1862. Union Democratic hold.	▌ ✓ George H. Yeaman (Union Democratic) 55.67%; ▌Edward R. Weir (Unknown) 43.61%; ▌Archibald Dixon (Unknown) 0.72%
Massachusetts 9	Goldsmith Bailey	Republican	1860	Incumbent died May 8, 1862. New member elected November 4, 1862. Republican hold.	▌ ✓ Amasa Walker (Republican) 66.36%; ▌Isaac Davis (Democratic) 33.64%
Wisconsin 2	Luther Hanchett	Republican	1860	Incumbent died November 24, 1862. New member elected December 30, 1862. Republican hold. Winner was also elected to the next term; see below.	▌ ✓ Walter D. McIndoe (Republican) 56.52%; ▌N. S. Ferris (Democratic) 41.06%; ▌Charles S. Benton (Democratic) 2.01%; Scattering 0.42%
Virginia 7	Charles H. Upton	Union	1861	Incumbent unseated February 27, 1862. New member elected January 15, 1863. Union hold.	▌ ✓ Lewis McKenzie (Union) 41.12%; ▌Andrew Wylie (Unknown) 38.95%; ▌Charles H. Upton (Unknown) 12.86%; ▌Chauncey H. Snow (Unknown) 7.07%
Louisiana 1	Vacant			Incumbent withdrew January 26, 1861. New member elected December 3, 1862. Union gain.	▌ ✓ Benjamin Flanders (Union) 93.08%; ▌John E. Bouligny (Union) 6.27%; Scattering 0.64%
Louisiana 2	Vacant			Incumbent withdrew January 26, 1861. New member elected December 3, 1862. Union gain.	▌ ✓ Michael Hahn (Union) 54.7%; ▌Edward H. Durell (Union) 28.49%; ▌Jacob Barker (Secessionist) 8.85%; ▌W. R. Greathouse (Unknown) 6.98%; Scattering 0.98%

=== 38th Congress ===
District	Incumbent			This race	
District	Member	Party	First elected	Results	Candidates
Wisconsin 6	Luther Hanchett	Republican	1860	Incumbent died November 23, 1862, after winning re-election. New member elected December 30, 1862. Republican hold. Successor was also elected to finish the current term; see above.	▌ ✓ Walter D. McIndoe (Republican) 57.29%; ▌Charles S. Benton (Democratic) 42.71%
Missouri 3	John W. Noell	Emancipation	1860	Incumbent died March 14, 1863. New member elected August 3, 1863. Democratic gain.	▌ ✓ John G. Scott (Democratic) 52.14%; ▌James Lindsay (Immediate Emancipation) 41.65%; ▌Joseph Bogy (Independent Democratic) 6.22%
New York 14	Erastus Corning	Democratic	1860	Incumbent resigned October 5, 1863. New member elected November 3, 1863. Democratic hold.	▌ ✓ John V. L. Pruyn (Democratic) 56.61%; ▌John K. Porter (Union) 43.39%
Delaware at-large	William Temple	Democratic	1862	Incumbent died May 28, 1863. New member elected November 19, 1863. Union gain.	▌ ✓ Nathaniel B. Smithers (Union) 99.73%; Scattering 0.27%

== Alabama ==
Alabama did not hold elections as a result of secession.

District	Incumbent			This race	
District	Member	Party	First elected	Results	Candidates
Alabama 1	Vacant			Seat vacant since January 12, 1861. No election.	None.
Alabama 2	Vacant			Seat vacant since January 12, 1861. No election.	None.
Alabama 3	Vacant			Seat vacant since January 12, 1861. No election.	None.
Alabama 4	Vacant			Seat vacant since January 12, 1861. No election.	None.
Alabama 5	Vacant			Seat vacant since January 12, 1861. No election.	None.
Alabama 6	Vacant			Seat vacant since January 12, 1861. No election.	None.

== Arkansas ==
Arkansas held no elections in 1862 or 1863 as a result of secession. Late elections were held in 1864, but the elected members were not seated by the House.

District	Incumbent			This race	
District	Member	Party	First elected	Results	Candidates
Arkansas 1	Vacant			Seat vacant since May 6, 1861. No election.	None.
Arkansas 2	Vacant			Seat vacant since May 6, 1861. No election.	None.
Arkansas 3	Vacant			Seat vacant since May 6, 1861. No election.	None.

== California ==
California elected its members on September 2, 1863, after the term began but before Congress convened. Voters chose three members on a statewide general ticket to represent the state's at-large congressional district.

District	Incumbent			This race	
District	Member	Party	First elected	Results	Candidates
California at-large Plural district with 3 seats	Timothy Phelps	Republican	1861	Incumbent retired. Union gain.	▌ ✓ Cornelius Cole (Union) 19.94%; ▌ ✓ Thomas B. Shannon (Union) 19.92%; ▌ ✓ William Higby (Union) 19.91%; ▌Ninian E. Whiteside (Democratic) 13.44%; ▌John B. Weller (Democratic) 13.40%; ▌John Bigler (Democratic) 13.39%
California at-large Plural district with 3 seats	Aaron A. Sargent	Republican	1861	Incumbent retired. Union gain.	▌ ✓ Cornelius Cole (Union) 19.94%; ▌ ✓ Thomas B. Shannon (Union) 19.92%; ▌ ✓ William Higby (Union) 19.91%; ▌Ninian E. Whiteside (Democratic) 13.44%; ▌John B. Weller (Democratic) 13.40%; ▌John Bigler (Democratic) 13.39%
California at-large Plural district with 3 seats	Frederick F. Low	Republican	1861	Incumbent retired. Union gain.	▌ ✓ Cornelius Cole (Union) 19.94%; ▌ ✓ Thomas B. Shannon (Union) 19.92%; ▌ ✓ William Higby (Union) 19.91%; ▌Ninian E. Whiteside (Democratic) 13.44%; ▌John B. Weller (Democratic) 13.40%; ▌John Bigler (Democratic) 13.39%

== Connecticut ==
Connecticut elected its members April 6, 1863, after the term began but before Congress convened.

District	Incumbent			This race	
District	Member	Party	First elected	Results	Candidates
Connecticut 1	Dwight Loomis	Republican	1859	Incumbent retired. Union gain.	▌ ✓ Henry C. Deming (Union) 50.81%; ▌Alvan P. Hyde (Democratic) 49.19%
Connecticut 2	James E. English	Democratic	1861	Incumbent re-elected.	▌ ✓ James E. English (Democratic) 52.33%; ▌Samuel L. Warner (Union) 47.67%
Connecticut 3	Alfred A. Burnham	Republican	1859	Incumbent retired. Union gain.	▌ ✓ Augustus Brandegee (Republican) 58.17%; ▌William M. Converse (Democratic) 41.83%
Connecticut 4	George C. Woodruff	Democratic	1861	Incumbent lost re-election. Union gain.	▌ ✓ John Henry Hubbard (Union) 50.80%; ▌George Catlin Woodruff (Democratic) 49.20%

== Colorado Territory ==
See non-voting delegates, below.

== Delaware ==
Delaware elected its member on November 1, 1862.

District	Incumbent			This race	
District	Member	Party	First elected	Results	Candidates
Delaware at-large	George P. Fisher	People's	1860	Incumbent lost re-election. Democratic gain.	▌ ✓ William Temple (Democratic) 50.12%; ▌George P. Fisher (Union) 49.88%

== Dakota Territory ==
See non-voting delegates, below.

== Florida ==
Florida did not hold elections as a result of secession.

District	Incumbent			This race	
District	Member	Party	First elected	Results	Candidates
Florida at-large	Vacant			Seat vacant since January 10, 1861. No election.	None.

== Georgia ==
Georgia did not hold elections as a result of secession.

District	Incumbent			This race	
District	Member	Party	First elected	Results	Candidates
Georgia 1	Vacant			Seat vacant since January 19, 1861. No election.	None.
Georgia 2	Vacant			Seat vacant since January 19, 1861. No election.	None.
Georgia 3	Vacant			Seat vacant since January 19, 1861. No election.	None.
Georgia 4	Vacant			Seat vacant since January 19, 1861. No election.	None.
Georgia 5	Vacant			Seat vacant since January 19, 1861. No election.	None.
Georgia 6	Vacant			Seat vacant since January 19, 1861. No election.	None.
Georgia 7	Vacant			Seat vacant since January 19, 1861. No election.	None.

== Idaho Territory ==
See non-voting delegates, below.

== Illinois ==
Illinois elected its members on November 4, 1862.

District	Incumbent			This race	
District	Member	Party	First elected	Results	Candidates (Note: Dubin lists the Union candidates as Republicans; however, the Illinois Republican Party had reformed as the Union Party earlier in 1862.)
Illinois at-large	None (new seat)			New seat. Democratic gain.	▌ ✓ James C. Allen (Democratic) 53.21%; ▌Ebon C. Ingersoll (Union) 46.79%
Illinois 1	Isaac N. Arnold; Redistricted from the 2nd district	Republican	1860	Incumbent re-elected as a Unionist. Union gain.	▌ ✓ Isaac N. Arnold (Union) 54.45%; ▌Francis C. Sherman (Democratic) 45.55%
Illinois 2	Vacant			Incumbent redistricted to the 1st district. Union gain.	▌ ✓ John F. Farnsworth (Union) 72.50%; ▌Neil Donnelly (Democratic) 27.50%
Illinois 3	Elihu B. Washburne; Redistricted from the 1st district	Republican	1852	Incumbent re-elected as a Unionist. Union gain.	▌ ✓ Elihu B. Washburne (Union) 60.74%; ▌Elias B. Stiles (Democratic) 39.26%
Illinois 4	William Kellogg	Republican	1856	Incumbent retired. Democratic gain.	▌ ✓ Charles M. Harris (Democratic) 57.17%; ▌Charles B. Lawrence (Union) 42.83%
Illinois 5	Owen Lovejoy; Redistricted from the 3rd district	Republican	1856	Incumbent re-elected as a Unionist. Union gain.	▌ ✓ Owen Lovejoy (Union) 50.10%; ▌Francis C. Sherman (Democratic) 47.26%
Illinois 6	None (new seat)			New seat. Union gain.	▌ ✓ Jesse O. Norton (Union) 55.74%; ▌F. Lyle Dickey (Democratic) 44.26%
Illinois 7	None (new seat)			New seat. Democratic gain.	▌ ✓ John R. Eden (Democratic) 53.18%; ▌Elijah McCarty (Union) 46.82%
Illinois 8	Philip B. Fouke	Democratic	1858	Incumbent retired. Democratic hold.	▌ ✓ John T. Stuart (Democratic) 52.81%; ▌Leonard Swett (Union) 47.19%
Illinois 9	None (new seat)			New seat. Democratic gain.	▌ ✓ Lewis W. Ross (Democratic) 99.06%; Scattering 0.94%
Illinois 10	Anthony L. Knapp; Redistricted from the 6th district	Democratic	1861 (special)	Incumbent re-elected.	▌ ✓ Anthony L. Knapp (Democratic) 64.90%; ▌Samuel W. Moulton (Union) 35.10%
Illinois 11	James C. Robinson; Redistricted from the 7th district	Democratic	1858	Incumbent re-elected	▌ ✓ James C. Robinson (Democratic) 71.19%; ▌Stephen G. Hicks (Union) 28.81%
Illinois 12	None (new seat)			New seat. Democratic gain.	▌ ✓ William R. Morrison (Democratic) 61.61%; ▌Robert Smith (Union) 38.39%
Illinois 13	William J. Allen; Redistricted from the 9th district	Democratic	1862 (special)	Incumbent re-elected.	▌ ✓ William J. Allen (Democratic) 68.88%; ▌Milton Bartley (Union) 31.12%

== Indiana ==
Indiana elected its members on October 14, 1862.

District	Incumbent			This race	
District	Member	Party	First elected	Results	Candidates
Indiana 1	John Law	Democratic	1860	Incumbent re-elected.	▌ ✓ John Law (Democratic) 55.52%; ▌Alvah Johnson (Union) 44.48%
Indiana 2	James A. Cravens	Democratic	1860	Incumbent re-elected.	▌ ✓ James A. Cravens (Democratic) 63.73%; ▌J. G. May (Union) 36.27%
Indiana 3	William M. Dunn	Republican	1858	Incumbent lost re-election. Democratic gain.	▌ ✓ Henry W. Harrington (Democratic) 53.18%; ▌William M. Dunn (Union) 46.82%
Indiana 4	William S. Holman	Democratic	1858	Incumbent re-elected.	▌ ✓ William S. Holman (Democratic) 57.75%; ▌James Gavin (Union) 42.25%
Indiana 5	George W. Julian	Republican	1860	Incumbent re-elected as a Unionist. Union gain.	▌ ✓ George W. Julian (Union) 55.57%; ▌Edmund Johnson (Democratic) 44.43%
Indiana 6	Albert G. Porter	Republican	1858	Incumbent retired. Union gain.	▌ ✓ Ebenezer Dumont (Union) 51.80%; ▌Alexander B. Conduitt (Democratic) 48.20%
Indiana 7	Daniel W. Voorhees	Democratic	1860	Incumbent re-elected.	▌ ✓ Daniel W. Voorhees (Democratic) 55.38%; ▌Harvey D. Scott (Union) 44.62%
Indiana 8	Albert Smith White	Republican	1860	Incumbent retired. Union gain.	▌ ✓ Godlove S. Orth (Union) 51.78%; ▌John Pettit (Democratic) 48.22%
Indiana 9	Schuyler Colfax	Republican	1854	Incumbent re-elected as a Unionist. Union gain.	▌ ✓ Schuyler Colfax (Union) 50.39%; ▌David Turpie (Democratic) 49.61%
Indiana 10	William Mitchell	Republican	1860	Incumbent lost re-election. Democratic gain.	▌ ✓ Joseph K. Edgerton (Democratic) 50.90%; ▌William Mitchell (Union) 49.10%
Indiana 11	John U. Pettit	Republican	1856	Incumbent retired. Democratic gain.	▌ ✓ James F. McDowell (Democratic) 51.82%; ▌John P. C. Shanks (Union) 48.18%

== Iowa ==
Iowa elected its members on October 14, 1862.

District	Incumbent			This race	
District	Member	Party	First elected	Results	Candidates
Iowa 1	Samuel R. Curtis	Republican	1856	Incumbent retired. Republican hold.	▌ ✓ James F. Wilson (Republican) 54.78%; ▌Joseph K. Hornish (Democratic) 45.22%
Iowa 2	William Vandever	Republican	1858	Incumbent retired. Republican hold.	▌ ✓ Hiram Price (Republican) 63.42%; ▌Edward H. Thayer (Democratic) 36.58%
Iowa 3	None (new seat)			New seat. Republican gain.	▌ ✓ William B. Allison (Republican) 58.90%; ▌Dennis Mahony (Democratic) 41.10%
Iowa 4	None (new seat)			New seat. Republican gain.	▌ ✓ Josiah B. Grinnell (Republican) 52.81%; ▌Hugh M. Martin (Democratic) 47.19%
Iowa 5	None (new seat)			New seat. Republican gain.	▌ ✓ John A. Kasson (Republican) 58.38%; ▌D. O. Finch (Democratic) 41.62%
Iowa 6	None (new seat)			New seat. Republican gain.	▌ ✓ Asahel W. Hubbard (Republican) 66.16%; ▌John F. Duncombe (Democratic) 33.84%

== Kansas ==
Kansas elected its member on November 4, 1862.

Whereas the Union Party replaced the Republicans in most states during the war, the Kansas Republican Party remained active. In a factional schism, opponents of U.S. senator Jim Lane split from the Republican Party in 1862 to form the Union Party with the support of the state's Democrats. This party, which nominated Marcus J. Parrott for Congress, was not affiliated with the national Republican–Union coalition and broke apart during the 1864 presidential election.

District	Incumbent			This race	
District	Member	Party	First elected	Results	Candidates
Kansas at-large	Martin F. Conway	Republican	1859	Incumbent retired. Republican hold.	▌ ✓ A. Carter Wilder (Republican) 63.35%; ▌Marcus J. Parrott (Union) 30.56%; ▌William G. Mathias (Democratic) 6.09%

== Kentucky ==
Kentucky elected its members on August 3, 1863, after the new term began but before Congress convened.

District	Incumbent			This race	
District	Member	Party	First elected	Results	Candidates
Kentucky 1	Samuel L. Casey	Union; Democratic	1862 (special)	Incumbent retired. Union Democratic hold.	▌ ✓ Lucien Anderson (Union Democratic) 82.44%; ▌Lawrence S. Trimble (Peace Democratic) 13.56%; ▌Thomas Owens 3.17%; Scattering 0.84%
Kentucky 2	George H. Yeaman	Union; Democratic	1862 (special)	Incumbent re-elected.	▌ ✓ George H. Yeaman (Union Democratic) 72.92%; ▌John H. McHenry (Peace Democratic) 27.08%
Kentucky 3	Henry Grider	Union; Democratic	1861	Incumbent re-elected.	▌ ✓ Henry Grider (Union Democratic) 87.00%; ▌Thomas C. Winfrey (Peace Democratic) 23.00%
Kentucky 4	Aaron Harding	Union; Democratic	1861	Incumbent re-elected.	▌ ✓ Aaron Harding (Union Democratic) 80.62%; ▌William J. Heady (Peace Democratic) 19.38%
Kentucky 5	Charles A. Wickliffe	Union; Democratic	1861	Incumbent retired. Union Democratic loss.	▌ ✓ Robert Mallory (Union Democratic) 71.64%; ▌Nathaniel Wolfe (Peace Democratic) 28.36%
Kentucky 5	Robert Mallory; Redistricted from the 7th district	Union; Democratic	1859	Incumbent re-elected.	▌ ✓ Robert Mallory (Union Democratic) 71.64%; ▌Nathaniel Wolfe (Peace Democratic) 28.36%
Kentucky 6	George W. Dunlap	Union; Democratic	1859	Incumbent retired. Unconditional Union Democratic gain.	▌ ✓ Green C. Smith (Unconditional Union Democratic) 61.99%; ▌John W. Menzies (Union Democratic) 20.40%; ▌John W. Leathers (Peace Democratic) 17.61%
Kentucky 6	John W. Menzies; Redistricted from the 10th district	Union; Democratic	1861	Incumbent lost re-election. Union Democratic loss.	▌ ✓ Green C. Smith (Unconditional Union Democratic) 61.99%; ▌John W. Menzies (Union Democratic) 20.40%; ▌John W. Leathers (Peace Democratic) 17.61%
Kentucky 7	Vacant			Incumbent redistricted to the 5th district. Union Democratic hold.	▌ ✓ Brutus J. Clay (Union Democratic) 50.43%; ▌Jere T. Boyle (Independent Union Democratic) 26.62%; ▌Richard A. Buckner (Peace Democratic) 22.94%
Kentucky 8	Vacant (Note: The incumbent Union Democrat John J. Crittenden died prior to the election.)			Incumbent died July 26, 1863. Union Democratic hold.	▌ ✓ William H. Randall (Union Democratic) 97.58%; ▌Robert Bradley (Peace Democratic) 2.42%
Kentucky 9	William H. Wadsworth	Union; Democratic	1861	Incumbent re-elected.	▌ ✓ William H. Wadsworth (Union Democratic) 92.13%; ▌Thomas S. Brown (Peace Democratic) 7.87%

== Louisiana ==
Louisiana held no elections for the 38th Congress in 1862 or 1863 as a result of secession. Late elections were held on September 5, 1864, but the elected members were not seated by the House.

District	Incumbent			This race	
District	Member	Party	First elected	Results	Candidates
Louisiana 1	Benjamin Flanders	Union	1862	No election. Union loss.	None.
Louisiana 2	Michael Hahn	Union	1862	No election. Union loss.	None.
Louisiana 3	Vacant			Seat vacant since January 26, 1861. No election.	None.
Louisiana 4	Vacant			Seat vacant since January 26, 1861. No election.	None.
Louisiana 5	Vacant			Seat vacant since January 26, 1861. No election.	None.

== Maine ==
Maine elected its members on September 8, 1862.

District	Incumbent			This race	
District	Member	Party	First elected	Results	Candidates
Maine 1	John N. Goodwin	Republican	1860	Incumbent lost re-election. Democratic gain.	▌ ✓ Lorenzo D. Sweat (Democratic) 48.73%; ▌John N. Goodwin (Republican) 48.13%; Scattering 3.14%
Maine 2	Charles W. Walton	Republican	1860	Incumbent retired. Republican hold.	▌ ✓ Sidney Perham (Republican) 57.00%; ▌George Bates (Democratic) 43.00%
Maine 3	Samuel C. Fessenden	Republican	1860	Incumbent retired. Republican hold.	▌ ✓ James G. Blaine (Republican) 58.13%; ▌Albert P. Gould (Democratic) 38.18%; Scattering 3.70%
Maine 4	Anson Morrill	Republican	1856	Incumbent retired. Republican loss.	▌ ✓ John H. Rice (Republican) 61.47%; ▌Gorham L. Boynton (Democratic) 28.76%; ▌Isaac Hayes (War Democratic) 9.77%
Maine 4	John H. Rice; Redistricted from the 5th district	Republican	1860	Incumbent re-elected.	▌ ✓ John H. Rice (Republican) 61.47%; ▌Gorham L. Boynton (Democratic) 28.76%; ▌Isaac Hayes (War Democratic) 9.77%
Maine 5	Frederick A. Pike; Redistricted from the 6th district	Republican	1860	Incumbent re-elected.	▌ ✓ Frederick A. Pike (Republican) 52.71%; ▌James White (Democratic) 47.29%

== Maryland ==
Maryland elected its members on November 3, 1863, after the new term began but before Congress convened.

District	Incumbent			This race	
District	Member	Party	First elected	Results	Candidates
Maryland 1	John W. Crisfield	Union	1861	Incumbent lost re-election as a Democrat. Union hold.	▌ ✓ John Creswell (Union) 57.39%; ▌John W. Crisfield (Democratic) 44.45%; ▌Daniel McHenry (Unknown) 0.88%
Maryland 2	Edwin H. Webster	Union	1859	Incumbent re-elected.	▌ ✓ Edwin H. Webster (Union) 100.0%
Maryland 3	Cornelius Leary	Union	1861	Incumbent retired. Union hold.	▌ ✓ Henry W. Davis (Union) 100.0%
Maryland 4	Henry May	Union and Peace	1861	Incumbent retired. Union and Peace loss.	▌ ✓ Francis Thomas (Union) 100.0%
Maryland 4	Francis Thomas; Redistricted from the 5th district	Union	1861	Incumbent re-elected.	▌ ✓ Francis Thomas (Union) 100.0%
Maryland 5	Charles B. Calvert; Redistricted from the 6th district	Union	1861	Incumbent lost re-election as a Conservative Unionist. Democratic gain.	▌ ✓ Benjamin G. Harris (Democratic) 46.91%; ▌Jonathan C. Holland (Union) 31.84%; ▌Charles B. Calvert (Conservative Union) 21.25%

== Massachusetts ==
Massachusetts elected its members on November 1, 1862.

Massachusetts Republicans resisted incorporation into the Union Party in 1861 and 1862. Conservative Republicans, former Whigs, and Democrats attended the state convention of the Constitutional Union Party which nominated candidates for the upcoming elections. The convention called itself the People's Party in order to attract votes from Democrats. Conservative former Whigs and Republicans in the party expressed strong support for the Lincoln administration during the spring and summer under the belief that the president firmly opposed emancipation. The Preliminary Emancipation Proclamation, issued less than two weeks before the state convention met, helped to divide and defeat the new party in its infancy.

District	Incumbent			This race	
District	Member	Party	First elected	Results	Candidates
Massachusetts 1	Thomas D. Eliot	Republican	1858	Incumbent re-elected.	▌ ✓ Thomas D. Eliot (Republican) 70.57%; ▌Daniel Fisher (Democratic) 23.21%; ▌William R. Easter (Unknown) 6.23%
Massachusetts 2	James Buffington	Republican	1854	Incumbent retired. Republican hold.	▌ ✓ Oakes Ames (Republican) 61.08%; ▌William D. Swan (People's) 38.92%
Massachusetts 3	Alexander H. Rice; Redistricted from the 4th district	Republican	1858	Incumbent re-elected.	▌ ✓ Alexander H. Rice (Republican) 50.12%; ▌John S. Sleeper (People's) 49.88%
Massachusetts 4	Samuel Hooper; Redistricted from the 5th district	Republican	1861 (special)	Incumbent re-elected.	▌ ✓ Samuel Hooper (Republican) 52.13%; ▌Josiah G. Abbott (People's) 47.87%
Massachusetts 5	John B. Alley; Redistricted from the 6th district	Republican	1858	Incumbent re-elected.	▌ ✓ John B. Alley (Republican) 61.17%; ▌Benjamin Poole (People's) 38.83%
Massachusetts 6	Daniel W. Gooch; Redistricted from the 7th district	Republican	1858	Incumbent re-elected.	▌ ✓ Daniel W. Gooch (Republican) 56.91%; ▌Oliver H. Perry (People's) 43.09%
Massachusetts 7	Benjamin F. Thomas; Redistricted from the 3rd district	Union	1861 (special)	Incumbent lost re-election as a Populist. Republican gain.	▌ ✓ George S. Boutwell (Republican) 55.17%; ▌Benjamin F. Thomas (People's) 44.83%
Massachusetts 8	Charles R. Train	Republican	1858	Incumbent retired. Republican hold.	▌ ✓ John D. Baldwin (Republican) 66.17%; ▌Paul Whitin (People's) 33.83%
Massachusetts 9	Vacant (Note: The Republican incumbent Goldsmith Bailey died prior to the election.)			Incumbent died May 8, 1862. Republican hold.	▌ ✓ William B. Washburn (Republican) 99.23%; Scattering 0.77%
Massachusetts 10	Charles Delano	Republican	1858	Incumbent retired. Republican loss.	▌ ✓ Henry L. Dawes (Republican) 56.29%; ▌Chester W. Chapin (People's) 43.71%
Massachusetts 10	Henry L. Dawes; Redistricted from the 11th district	Republican	1856	Incumbent re-elected.	▌ ✓ Henry L. Dawes (Republican) 56.29%; ▌Chester W. Chapin (People's) 43.71%

== Michigan ==
Michigan elected its members on November 4, 1862.

A Democratic proposal for a bipartisan Union ticket was rejected by the Radical leadership of the Michigan Republican Party. The Democrats went ahead with plans for a Union state convention and called themselves Union Democrats or Fusionists during the campaign in hopes of attracting votes from disaffected Conservative Republicans. Some conservatives did support the Union ticket, which was disavowed by the Republican state committee.

District	Incumbent			This race	
District	Member	Party	First elected	Results	Candidates
Michigan 1	Fernando C. Beaman; Redistricted from the 2nd district	Republican	1860	Incumbent re-elected.	▌ ✓ Fernando C. Beaman (Republican) 50.36%; ▌Ebenezer J. Penniman (Union Democratic) 49.64%
Michigan 2	None (new seat)			New seat. Republican gain.	▌ ✓ Charles Upson (Republican) 55.41%; ▌John W. Turner (Union Democratic) 44.59%
Michigan 3	Bradley F. Granger; Redistricted from the 1st district	Republican	1860	Incumbent lost re-election as a Union Democrat. Republican hold.	▌ ✓ John W. Longyear (Republican) 51.81%; ▌Bradley F. Granger (Union Democratic) 48.19%
Michigan 4	Francis W. Kellogg; Redistricted from the 3rd district	Republican	1858	Incumbent re-elected.	▌ ✓ Francis W. Kellogg (Republican) 57.81%; ▌Thomas B. Church (Union Democratic) 42.19%
Michigan 5	Rowland E. Trowbridge; Redistricted from the 4th district	Republican	1860	Incumbent lost re-election. Union Democratic gain.	▌ ✓ Augustus C. Baldwin (Union Democratic) 50.62%; ▌Rowland E. Trowbridge (Republican) 49.38%
Michigan 6	None (new seat)			New seat. Republican gain.	▌ ✓ John F. Driggs (Republican) 51.77%; ▌John Moore (Union Democratic) 48.23%

== Minnesota ==
Minnesota elected its members on November 4, 1862.

District	Incumbent			This race	
District	Member	Party	First elected	Results	Candidates
Minnesota 1	William Windom; Redistricted from the at-large district	Republican	1859	Incumbent re-elected.	▌ ✓ William Windom (Republican) 58.18%; ▌Andrew G. Chatfield (Democratic) 41.82%
Minnesota 2	Cyrus Aldrich; Redistricted from the at-large district	Republican	1859	Incumbent retired to run for U.S. senator. Republican hold.	▌ ✓ Ignatius L. Donnelly (Republican) 58.46%; ▌William J. Cullen (Democratic) 41.54%

== Mississippi ==
Mississippi did not hold elections as a result of secession.

District	Incumbent			This race	
District	Member	Party	First elected	Results	Candidates
Mississippi 1	Vacant			Seat vacant since January 9, 1861. No election.	None.
Mississippi 2	Vacant			Seat vacant since January 9, 1861. No election.	None.
Mississippi 3	Vacant			Seat vacant since January 9, 1861. No election.	None.
Mississippi 4	Vacant			Seat vacant since January 9, 1861. No election.	None.
Mississippi 5	Vacant			Seat vacant since January 9, 1861. No election.	None.

== Missouri ==
Missouri elected its members on November 4, 1862.

Missouri Unionists contested this election as the Emancipation Party. The party was divided ideologically between conservative Claybanks, who favored a plan of gradual emancipation, and radical Charcoals, who supported immediate emancipation. In St. Louis, Gradual and Immediate Emancipationists ran opposing tickets. Some sources list the Gradual Emancipation candidates as Republicans; however, the Republican state committee deliberately deemphasized old party labels in its call for the state convention which gave rise to the Emancipation Party. Francis Preston Blair Jr., the most prominent leader of the Antebellum Missouri Republican Party, was nominated on the Union Emancipation ticket in Missouri's 1st congressional district and contested the election as a Gradual Emancipationist.

District	Incumbent			This race	
District	Member	Party	First elected	Results	Candidates
Missouri 1	Francis P. Blair Jr.	Republican	1860	Incumbent re-elected as a Gradual Emancipationist. Gradual Emancipation gain.	▌ ✓ Francis P. Blair Jr. (Gradual Emancipation) 39.96%; ▌Samuel Knox (Immediate Emancipation) 38.67%; ▌Lewis V. Bogy (Democratic) 21.37%
Missouri 2	None (new seat)			New seat. Immediate Emancipation gain.	▌ ✓ Henry T. Blow (Immediate Emancipation) 69.51%; ▌Thomas Allen (Democratic) 28.95%; ▌Thomas S. Nelson (Gradual Emancipation) 1.53%
Missouri 3	John B. Clark	Democratic	1856	Incumbent retired. Democratic loss.	▌ ✓ John W. Noell (Emancipation) 48.39%; ▌John G. Scott (Democratic) 48.27%; ▌William Lawson (Independent Democratic) 3.34%
Missouri 3	John W. Noell; Redistricted from the 7th district	Democratic	1858	Incumbent re-elected as an Emancipationist. Emancipation gain.	▌ ✓ John W. Noell (Emancipation) 48.39%; ▌John G. Scott (Democratic) 48.27%; ▌William Lawson (Independent Democratic) 3.34%
Missouri 4	Elijah H. Norton	Democratic	1860	Incumbent retired. Immediate Emancipation gain.	▌ ✓ Sempronius H. Boyd (Immediate Emancipation) 62.54%; ▌John S. Phelps (Democratic) 37.46%
Missouri 4	John S. Phelps; Redistricted from the 6th district	Democratic	1844	Incumbent lost re-election. Democratic loss.	▌ ✓ Sempronius H. Boyd (Immediate Emancipation) 62.54%; ▌John S. Phelps (Democratic) 37.46%
Missouri 5	Thomas L. Price	Democratic	1862 (special)	Incumbent lost re-election. Immediate Emancipation gain.	▌ ✓ Joseph W. McClurg (Immediate Emancipation) 53.22%; ▌Thomas L. Price (Democratic) 46.78%
Missouri 6	Vacant			Incumbent redistricted to the 4th district. Democratic gain.	▌ ✓ Austin A. King (Democratic) 45.28%; ▌James H. Birch (Peace Democratic) 30.49%; ▌Edward M. Samuel (Independent Democratic) 17.35%; ▌Henry B. Bouton (Emancipation) 6.87%
Missouri 7	None (new seat)			New seat. Immediate Emancipation gain.	▌ ✓ Benjamin F. Loan (Immediate Emancipation) 43.53%; ▌John P. Bruce (Democratic) 35.58%; ▌Henry B. Branch (Emancipation) 20.90%
Missouri 8	William A. Hall; Redistricted from the 3rd district	Democratic	1861 (special)	Incumbent re-elected.	▌ ✓ William A. Hall (Democratic) 53.01%; ▌Moses P. Green (Emancipation) 46.99%
Missouri 9	James S. Rollins; Redistricted from the 2nd district	Constitutional; Union	1860	Incumbent re-elected as a Conservative Unionist. Conservative Union gain.	▌ ✓ James S. Rollins (Conservative Union (Note: Dubin lists Rollins as a Democrat; however, Rollins's biographer clarifies that Rollins was elected as a Conservative Unionist and joined the Democratic Party toward the end of his term.)) 73.35%; ▌Arnold Krekel (Emancipation) 26.65%

== Nebraska Territory ==
See non-voting delegates, below.

== Nevada Territory ==
See non-voting delegates, below.

== New Hampshire ==
New Hampshire elected its members on March 10, 1863.

District	Incumbent			This race	
District	Member	Party	First elected	Results	Candidates
New Hampshire 1	Gilman Marston	Republican	1859	Incumbent retired. Democratic gain.	▌ ✓ Daniel Marcy (Democratic) 50.17%; ▌Joel Eastman (Republican) 49.83%
New Hampshire 2	Edward H. Rollins	Republican	1861	Incumbent re-elected.	▌ ✓ Edward H. Rollins (Republican) 50.90%; ▌John H. George (Democratic) 49.10%
New Hampshire 3	Thomas M. Edwards	Republican	1859	Incumbent retired. Republican hold.	▌ ✓ James W. Patterson (Republican) 50.64%; ▌William Burns (Democratic) 49.36%

== New Mexico Territory ==
See non-voting delegates, below.

== New Jersey ==
New Jersey elected its members on November 4, 1862.

District	Incumbent			This race	
District	Member	Party	First elected	Results	Candidates
New Jersey 1	John T. Nixon	Republican	1858	Incumbent retired. Union gain.	▌ ✓ John F. Starr (Union) 51.44%; ▌Nathaniel T. Stratton (Democratic) 48.56%
New Jersey 2	John L. N. Stratton	Republican	1858	Incumbent retired. Democratic gain.	▌ ✓ George Middleton (Democratic) 52.86%; ▌William F. Brown (Union) 47.14%
New Jersey 3	William G. Steele	Democratic	1860	Incumbent re-elected.	▌ ✓ William G. Steele (Democratic) 63.34%; ▌Orestes Brownson (Union) 36.66%
New Jersey 4	George T. Cobb	Democratic	1860	Incumbent retired. Democratic hold.	▌ ✓ Andrew J. Rogers (Democratic) 56.71%; ▌John Linn (Union) 43.29%
New Jersey 5	Nehemiah Perry	Democratic	1860	Incumbent re-elected	▌ ✓ Nehemiah Perry (Democratic) 58.57%; ▌Joseph B. Bradley (Union) 41.43%

== New York ==
New York elected its members on November 4, 1862.

District	Incumbent			This race	
District	Member	Party	First elected	Results	Candidates
New York 1	Edward H. Smith	Democratic	1860	Incumbent retired. Democratic hold.	▌ ✓ Henry G. Stebbins (Democratic) 56.08%; ▌Richard C. McCormick (Union) 43.92%
New York 2	William Wall; Redistricted from the 5th district	Republican	1860	Incumbent lost re-election. Democratic gain.	▌ ✓ Martin Kalbfleisch (Democratic) 66.30%; ▌William Wall (Union) 33.70%
New York 3	Moses F. Odell; Redistricted from the 2nd district	Democratic	1860	Incumbent re-elected.	▌ ✓ Moses F. Odell (Democratic) 54.29%; ▌James Humphrey (Union) 45.71%
New York 4	Benjamin Wood; Redistricted from the 3rd district	Democratic	1860	Incumbent re-elected.	▌ ✓ Benjamin Wood (Democratic) 63.32%; ▌Hiram Walbridge (Union) 36.68%
New York 5	Vacant			Incumbent redistricted to the 2nd district. Democratic gain.	▌ ✓ Fernando Wood (Democratic) 70.10%; ▌John Duffy (Union) 29.90%
New York 6	Frederick A. Conkling	Republican	1860	Incumbent lost re-election. Republican loss.	▌ ✓ Elijah Ward (Democratic) 54.33%; ▌Frederick A. Conkling (Union) 37.87%; ▌Orrison Hunt (People's Union) 7.80%
New York 6	Elijah Ward; Redistricted from the 7th district	Democratic	1860	Incumbent re-elected.	▌ ✓ Elijah Ward (Democratic) 54.33%; ▌Frederick A. Conkling (Union) 37.87%; ▌Orrison Hunt (People's Union) 7.80%
New York 7	Vacant			Incumbent redistricted to the 6th district. Democratic hold.	▌ ✓ John W. Chanler (Democratic) 76.05%; ▌Henry A. Burr (Union) 23.95%
New York 8	Isaac C. Delaplaine	Democratic	1860	Incumbent retired. Democratic hold.	▌ ✓ James Brooks (Democratic) 63.34%; ▌Elliot Cowdin (Union) 36.66%
New York 9	Vacant			Incumbent redistricted to the 10th district. Democratic hold.	▌ ✓ Anson Herrick (Democratic) 64.19%; ▌Leod Murphy (Union) 35.81%
New York 10	Charles Van Wyck	Republican	1858	Incumbent retired. Democratic gain.	▌ ✓ William Radford (Democratic) 45.82%; ▌ Edward Haight (Union) 40.88%; ▌Andrew E. Suffern (Independent Democratic) 13.30%
New York 10	Edward Haight; Redistricted from the 9th district	Democratic	1860	Incumbent lost re-election. Democratic loss.	▌ ✓ William Radford (Democratic) 45.82%; ▌ Edward Haight (Union) 40.88%; ▌Andrew E. Suffern (Independent Democratic) 13.30%
New York 11	Vacant			Incumbent redistricted to the 13th district. Democratic hold.	▌ ✓ Charles H. Winfield (Democratic) 55.19%; ▌Stephen Fullerton (Union) 44.81%
New York 12	Charles L. Beale	Republican	1858	Incumbent lost re-election. Democratic gain.	▌ ✓ Homer A. Nelson (Democratic) 53.40%; ▌Charles L. Beale (Union) 46.60%
New York 13	John B. Steele; Redistricted from the 11th district	Democratic	1860	Incumbent re-elected.	▌ ✓ John B. Steele (Democratic) 54.93%; ▌Thomas Cornell (Union) 45.07%
New York 14	Erastus Corning	Democratic	1860	Incumbent re-elected.	▌ ✓ Erastus Corning (Democratic) 59.57%; ▌Henry Smith (Union) 40.43%
New York 15	James B. McKean	Republican	1858	Incumbent retired. Democratic gain.	▌ ✓ John A. Griswold (Democratic) 52.78%; ▌Edward Dodd (Union) 47.22%
New York 16	William A. Wheeler	Republican	1860	Incumbent retired. Union gain.	▌ ✓ Orlando Kellogg (Union) 52.28%; ▌Benjamin P. Burhans (Democratic) 47.72%
New York 17	Socrates N. Sherman	Republican	1860	Incumbent retired. Union gain.	▌ ✓ Calvin T. Hulburd (Union) 67.19%; ▌David C. Judson (Democratic) 32.81%
New York 18	Chauncey Vibbard	Democratic	1860	Incumbent retired. Union gain.	▌ ✓ James M. Marvin (Union) 51.00%; ▌Isaiah Blood (Democratic) 49.00%
New York 19	Richard Franchot	Republican	1860	Incumbent retired. Union gain.	▌ ✓ Samuel F. Miller (Union) 52.45%; ▌Robert Parker (Democratic) 47.55%
New York 20	Ambrose W. Clark; Redistricted from the 23rd district	Republican	1860	Incumbent re-elected as a Unionist. Union gain.	▌ ✓ Ambrose W. Clark (Union) 57.34%; ▌Lorenzo Carryl (Democratic) 42.66%
New York 21	Roscoe Conkling; Redistricted from the 20th district	Republican	1858	Incumbent lost re-election. Democratic gain.	▌ ✓ Francis Kernan (Democratic) 50.25%; ▌Roscoe Conkling (Union) 49.75%
New York 22	William E. Lansing	Republican	1860	Incumbent retired. Union gain.	▌ ✓ DeWitt C. Littlejohn (Union) 59.98%; ▌William Titus (Democratic) 40.02%
New York 23	Vacant			Incumbent redistricted to the 20th district. Union gain.	▌ ✓ Thomas T. Davis (Union) 58.47%; ▌John M. Strong (Democratic) 41.53%
New York 24	Charles B. Sedgwick	Republican	1858	Incumbent retired. Republican loss.	▌ ✓ Theodore M. Pomeroy (Union) 55.27%; ▌Sterling C. Hadley (Democratic) 44.73%
New York 24	Theodore M. Pomeroy; Redistricted from the 25th district	Republican	1860	Incumbent re-elected as a Unionist. Union gain.	▌ ✓ Theodore M. Pomeroy (Union) 55.27%; ▌Sterling C. Hadley (Democratic) 44.73%
New York 25	Vacant			Incumbent redistricted to the 24th district. Union gain.	▌ ✓ Daniel Morris (Union) 58.74%; ▌Scott Lord (Democratic) 41.26%
New York 26	Jacob P. Chamberlain	Republican	1860	Incumbent retired. Union gain.	▌ ✓ Giles W. Hotchkiss (Union) 58.68%; ▌Charles G. Day (Democratic) 41.32%
New York 27	Alexander S. Diven	Republican	1860	Incumbent retired. Republican loss.	▌ ✓ Robert B. Van Valkenburgh (Union) 58.01%; ▌Samuel C. Hathaway (Democratic) 41.99%
New York 27	Robert B. Van Valkenburgh; Redistricted from the 28th district	Republican	1860	Incumbent re-elected as a Unionist. Union gain.	▌ ✓ Robert B. Van Valkenburgh (Union) 58.01%; ▌Samuel C. Hathaway (Democratic) 41.99%
New York 28	Vacant			Incumbent redistricted to the 27th district. Union gain.	▌ ✓ Freeman Clarke (Union) 53.23%; ▌Sanford E. Church (Democratic) 46.77%
New York 29	Alfred Ely	Republican	1858	Incumbent retired. Republican loss.	▌ ✓ Augustus Frank (Union) 52.10%; ▌Washington Hunt (Democratic) 47.90%
New York 29	Augustus Frank; Redistricted from the 30th district	Republican	1858	Incumbent re-elected as a Unionist. Union gain.	▌ ✓ Augustus Frank (Union) 52.10%; ▌Washington Hunt (Democratic) 47.90%
New York 30	Elbridge G. Spaulding; Redistricted from the 32nd district	Republican	1858	Incumbent lost re-election. Democratic gain.	▌ ✓ John Ganson (Democratic) 57.98%; ▌Elbridge G. Spaulding (Union) 42.02%
New York 31	Burt Van Horn	Republican	1860	Incumbent retired. Republican loss.	▌ ✓ Reuben Fenton (Union) 63.12%; ▌Stephen D. Caldwell (Democratic) 36.88%
New York 31	Reuben Fenton	Republican	1856	Incumbent re-elected as a Unionist. Union gain.	▌ ✓ Reuben Fenton (Union) 63.12%; ▌Stephen D. Caldwell (Democratic) 36.88%

== North Carolina ==
North Carolina did not hold elections as a result of secession.

District	Incumbent			This race	
District	Member	Party	First elected	Results	Candidates
North Carolina 1	Vacant			Seat vacant since May 20, 1861. No election.	None.
North Carolina 2	Vacant			Seat vacant since May 20, 1861. No election.	None.
North Carolina 3	Vacant			Seat vacant since May 20, 1861. No election.	None.
North Carolina 4	Vacant			Seat vacant since May 20, 1861. No election.	None.
North Carolina 5	Vacant			Seat vacant since May 20, 1861. No election.	None.
North Carolina 6	Vacant			Seat vacant since May 20, 1861. No election.	None.
North Carolina 7	Vacant			Seat vacant since May 20, 1861. No election.	None.

== Ohio ==
Ohio elected its members on October 14, 1862.

District	Incumbent			This race	
District	Member	Party	First elected	Results	Candidates
Ohio 1	George H. Pendleton	Democratic	1856	Incumbent re-elected.	▌ ✓ George H. Pendleton (Democratic) 54.04%; ▌William S. Groesbeck (Union) 45.96%
Ohio 2	John A. Gurley	Republican	1858	Incumbent lost re-election. Democratic gain.	▌ ✓ Alexander Long (Democratic) 50.46%; ▌John A. Gurley (Union) 49.54%
Ohio 3	Clement Vallandigham	Democratic	1858	Incumbent lost re-election. Union gain.	▌ ✓ Robert C. Schenck (Union) 52.53%; ▌Clement Vallandigham (Democratic) 47.47%
Ohio 4	William Allen	Democratic	1858	Incumbent retired. Democratic hold.	▌ ✓ John F. McKinney (Democratic) 51.99%; ▌William H. West (Union) 48.01%
Ohio 5	Vacant			Incumbent redistricted to the 10th district. Democratic gain.	▌ ✓ Francis C. Le Blond (Democratic) 63.00%; ▌Conduce H. Gatch (Union) 37.00%
Ohio 6	Chilton A. White	Democratic	1860	Incumbent re-elected.	▌ ✓ Chilton A. White (Democratic) 51.98%; ▌Robert M. Briggs (Union) 48.02%
Ohio 7	Richard A. Harrison	Union	1861 (special)	Incumbent retired. Union loss.	▌ ✓ Samuel S. Cox (Democratic) 50.66%; ▌Samuel Shellabarger (Union) 49.34%
Ohio 7	Samuel S. Cox; Redistricted from the 12th district	Democratic	1856	Incumbent re-elected.	▌ ✓ Samuel S. Cox (Democratic) 50.66%; ▌Samuel Shellabarger (Union) 49.34%
Ohio 7	Samuel Shellabarger; Redistricted from the 8th district	Republican	1860	Incumbent lost re-election. Republican loss.	▌ ✓ Samuel S. Cox (Democratic) 50.66%; ▌Samuel Shellabarger (Union) 49.34%
Ohio 8	Vacant			Incumbent redistricted to the 7th district. Democratic gain.	▌ ✓ William Johnston (Democratic) 51.05%; ▌James H. Godman (Union) 48.95%
Ohio 9	Warren P. Noble	Democratic	1860	Incumbent re-elected.	▌ ✓ Warren P. Noble (Democratic) 52.79%; ▌Samuel T. Worcester (Union) 47.21%
Ohio 9	Samuel T. Worcester; Redistricted from the 13th district	Republican	1861 (special)	Incumbent lost re-election. Republican loss.	▌ ✓ Warren P. Noble (Democratic) 52.79%; ▌Samuel T. Worcester (Union) 47.21%
Ohio 10	James M. Ashley; Redistricted from the 5th district	Republican	1858	Incumbent re-elected as a Unionist. Union gain.	▌ ✓ James M. Ashley (Union) 38.55%; ▌Morrison Waite (Independent Union) 32.26%; ▌James W. Phelps (Democratic) 29.19%
Ohio 11	Valentine B. Horton	Republican	1860	Incumbent retired. Democratic gain.	▌ ✓ Wells A. Hutchins (Democratic) 56.22%; ▌Hezekiah S. Bundy (Union) 43.78%
Ohio 12	Carey A. Trimble; Redistricted from the 10th district	Republican	1858	Incumbent lost re-election. Democratic gain.	▌ ✓ William E. Finck (Democratic) 62.97%; ▌Carey A. Trimble (Union) 37.03%
Ohio 13	Vacant			Incumbent redistricted to the 9th district. Democratic gain.	▌ ✓ John O'Neill (Democratic) 56.82%; ▌George B. Wright (Union) 43.18%
Ohio 14	Harrison G. O. Blake	Republican	1859 (special)	Incumbent retired. Democratic gain.	▌ ✓ George Bliss (Democratic) 50.09%; ▌Martin Welker (Union) 49.91%
Ohio 15	Robert H. Nugen	Democratic	1860	Incumbent retired. Democratic loss.	▌ ✓ James R. Morris (Democratic) 52.94%; ▌William P. Cutler (Union) 47.06%
Ohio 15	James R. Morris; Redistricted from the 17th district	Democratic	1860	Incumbent re-elected.	▌ ✓ James R. Morris (Democratic) 52.94%; ▌William P. Cutler (Union) 47.06%
Ohio 15	William P. Cutler; Redistricted from the 16th district	Republican	1860	Incumbent lost re-election. Republican loss.	▌ ✓ James R. Morris (Democratic) 52.94%; ▌William P. Cutler (Union) 47.06%
Ohio 16	Vacant			Incumbent redistricted to the 15th district. Democratic gain.	▌ ✓ Joseph W. White (Democratic) 55.16%; ▌John Bingham (Union) 44.84%
Ohio 17	Vacant			Incumbent redistricted to the 16th district. Union gain.	▌ ✓ Ephraim R. Eckley (Union) 52.44%; ▌George Belden (Democratic) 47.56%
Ohio 18	Sidney Edgerton	Republican	1858	Incumbent retired. Union gain.	▌ ✓ Rufus P. Spalding (Union) 68.96%; ▌David R. Paige (Democratic) 31.04%
Ohio 19	Albert G. Riddle	Republican	1860	Incumbent retired. Union gain.	▌ ✓ James A. Garfield (Union) 66.27%; ▌George W. Wood (Democratic) 33.73%

== Oregon ==
Oregon elected its members on June 2, 1862.

District	Incumbent			This race	
District	Member	Party	First elected	Results	Candidates
Oregon at-large	George Shiel	Democratic	1860	Incumbent retired. Union gain.	▌ ✓ John R. McBride (Union) 65.18%; ▌A. E. Wait (Democratic) 34.82%

== Pennsylvania ==
Pennsylvania elected its members on October 14, 1862.

District	Incumbent			This race	
District	Member	Party	First elected	Results	Candidates (Note: Dubin lists the Union candidates as Republicans; however, the Pennsylvania People's Party, the state's Republican affiliate, had reformed as the Union Party earlier in 1862.)
Pennsylvania 1	William E. Lehman	Democratic	1860	Incumbent retired. Democratic hold.	▌ ✓ Samuel J. Randall (Democratic) 55.17%; ▌Edward G. Webb (Union) 44.83%
Pennsylvania 2	Charles J. Biddle	Democratic	1861 (special)	Incumbent lost re-election. Union gain.	▌ ✓ Charles O'Neill (Union) 58.67%; ▌Charles J. Biddle (Democratic) 41.33%
Pennsylvania 3	John P. Verree	People's	1858	Incumbent retired. Union gain.	▌ ✓ Leonard Myers (Union) 50.13%; ▌John Kilne (Democratic) 49.87%
Pennsylvania 4	William D. Kelley	People's	1860	Incumbent re-elected as a Unionist. Union gain.	▌ ✓ William D. Kelley (Union) 52.43%; ▌James B. Nicholson (Democratic) 47.57%
Pennsylvania 5	William M. Davis	People's	1860	Incumbent retired. Union gain.	▌ ✓ M. Russell Thayer (Union) 50.16%; ▌Charles W. Carrigan (Democratic) 49.84%
Pennsylvania 6	John Hickman	People's	1856	Incumbent retired. People's loss.	▌ ✓ John D. Stiles (Democratic) 58.31%; ▌David Krause (Union) 41.69%
Pennsylvania 6	John D. Stiles; Redistricted from the 7th district	Democratic	1862 (special)	Incumbent re-elected.	▌ ✓ John D. Stiles (Democratic) 58.31%; ▌David Krause (Union) 41.69%
Pennsylvania 7	Vacant			Incumbent redistricted to the 6th district. Union gain.	▌ ✓ John M. Broomall (Union) 60.55%; ▌George A. McCall (Democratic) 39.45%
Pennsylvania 8	Sydenham E. Ancona	Democratic	1860	Incumbent re-elected.	▌ ✓ Sydenham E. Ancona (Democratic) 67.17%; ▌Joel B. Warner (Union) 32.83%
Pennsylvania 9	Thaddeus Stevens	People's	1858	Incumbent re-elected as a Unionist. Union gain.	▌ ✓ Thaddeus Stevens (Union) 62.69%; ▌George M. Steinman (Democratic) 37.31%
Pennsylvania 10	John W. Killinger	People's	1858	Incumbent retired. Democratic gain.	▌ ✓ Myer Strouse (Democratic) 52.03%; ▌James H. Campbell (Union) 47.97%
Pennsylvania 10	James H. Campbell; Redistricted from the 11th district	People's	1858	Incumbent lost re-election. People's loss.	▌ ✓ Myer Strouse (Democratic) 52.03%; ▌James H. Campbell (Union) 47.97%
Pennsylvania 11	Philip Johnson; Redistricted from the 13th district	Democratic	1860	Incumbent re-elected.	▌ ✓ Philip Johnson (Democratic) 82.04%; ▌Edward H. Rouch (Union) 17.96%
Pennsylvania 12	Hendrick B. Wright	Democratic	1861 (special)	Incumbent retired. Democratic hold.	▌ ✓ Charles Denison (Democratic) 54.20%; ▌Galusha A. Grow (Union) 45.80%
Pennsylvania 12	Galusha A. Grow; Redistricted from the 14th district	People's	1850	Incumbent lost re-election. People's loss.	▌ ✓ Charles Denison (Democratic) 54.20%; ▌Galusha A. Grow (Union) 45.80%
Pennsylvania 13	Vacant			Incumbent redistricted to the 11th district. Union gain.	▌ ✓ Henry W. Tracy (Union) 55.27%; ▌Robert F. Clark (Democratic) 44.73%
Pennsylvania 14	Vacant			Incumbent redistricted to the 12th district. Democratic gain.	▌ ✓ William H. Miller (Democratic) 51.26%; ▌John J. Patterson (Union) 48.74%
Pennsylvania 15	Joseph Bailey; Redistricted from the 16th district	Democratic	1860	Incumbent re-elected as a War Democrat. War Democratic gain.	▌ ✓ Joseph Bailey (War Democratic) 55.11%; ▌Adam J. Glossbrenner (Democratic) 44.89%
Pennsylvania 16	Edward McPherson; Redistricted from the 17th district	People's	1858	Incumbent lost re-election. Democratic gain.	▌ ✓ Alexander H. Coffroth (Democratic) 51.05%; ▌Edward McPherson (Union) 48.95%
Pennsylvania 17	Samuel S. Blair; Redistricted from the 18th district	People's	1858	Incumbent lost re-election. Democratic gain.	▌ ✓ Archibald McAllister (Democratic) 52.30%; ▌Samuel S. Blair (Union) 47.70%
Pennsylvania 18	James T. Hale; Redistricted from the 15th district	People's	1858	Incumbent re-elected as an Independent Unionist. Independent Union gain.	▌ ✓ James T. Hale (Independent Union) 49.29%; ▌ William H. Armstrong (Union (Note: Dubin lists Armstrong as a Democrat; however, Armstrong was nominated by the Union Party in the 18th district to oppose Hale, who ran as an independent candidate. Contemporary sources identify Armstrong as a Unionist and Hale as an Independent Unionist.)) 47.31%; ▌ Hiram A. Childs (Democratic) 3.40%
Pennsylvania 19	John Covode	People's	1854	Incumbent retired. Union gain.	▌ ✓ Glenni W. Scofield (Union) 51.27%; ▌Milton C. Courtwright (Democratic) 48.73%
Pennsylvania 20	Vacant			Incumbent districted to the 24th district. Union gain.	▌ ✓ Amos Myers (Union) 51.70%; ▌Gaylord Church (Democratic) 48.30%
Pennsylvania 21	Vacant			Incumbent redistricted to the 22nd district. Democratic gain.	▌ ✓ John L. Dawson (Democratic) 50.55%; ▌William Stewart (Union) 49.45%
Pennsylvania 22	Robert McKnight	People's	1858	Incumbent retired. People's loss.	▌ ✓ James K. Moorhead (Union) 58.60%; ▌George P. Hamilton (Democratic) 41.40%
Pennsylvania 22	James K. Moorhead; Redistricted from the 21st district	People's	1858	Incumbent re-elected as a Unionist. Union gain.	▌ ✓ James K. Moorhead (Union) 58.60%; ▌George P. Hamilton (Democratic) 41.40%
Pennsylvania 23	Vacant			Incumbent redistricted to the 24th district. Union gain.	▌ ✓ Thomas Williams (Union) 54.07%; ▌Jacob Ziegler (Democratic) 45.93%
Pennsylvania 24	Elijah Babbitt	People's	1858	Incumbent retired. People's loss.	▌ ✓ Jesse Lazear (Democratic) 51.09%; ▌John W. Wallace (Union) 48.91%
Pennsylvania 24	Jesse Lazear; Redistricted from the 20th district	Democratic	1860	Incumbent re-elected.	▌ ✓ Jesse Lazear (Democratic) 51.09%; ▌John W. Wallace (Union) 48.91%
Pennsylvania 24	John Winfield Wallace; Redistricted from the 23rd district	People's	1860	Incumbent lost re-election. People's loss.	▌ ✓ Jesse Lazear (Democratic) 51.09%; ▌John W. Wallace (Union) 48.91%

== Rhode Island ==
Rhode Island elected its members on April 1, 1863, after the term began but before the Congress convened.

District	Incumbent			This race	
District	Member	Party	First elected	Results	Candidates
Rhode Island 1 Eastern district	William P. Sheffield	Constitutional; Union	1861	Incumbent retired. Union gain.	▌ ✓ Thomas Jenckes (Union) 58.61%; ▌Charles S. Bradley (Democratic) 41.39%
Rhode Island 2 Western district	George H. Browne	Constitutional; Union	1861	Incumbent lost re-election as a Democrat. Union gain.	▌ ✓ Nathan F. Dixon (Union) 56.92%; ▌George H. Browne (Democratic) 43.08%

== South Carolina ==
South Carolina did not hold elections as a result of secession.

District	Incumbent			This race	
District	Member	Party	First elected	Results	Candidates
South Carolina 1	Vacant			Seat vacant since December 20, 1860. No election.	None.
South Carolina 2	Vacant			Seat vacant since December 20, 1860. No election.	None.
South Carolina 3	Vacant			Seat vacant since December 20, 1860. No election.	None.
South Carolina 4	Vacant			Seat vacant since December 20, 1860. No election.	None.

== Tennessee ==
Tennessee did not hold elections as a result of secession.

District	Incumbent			This race	
District	Member	Party	First elected	Results	Candidates
Tennessee 1	Vacant			Seat vacant since June 8, 1861. No election.	None.
Tennessee 2	Horace Maynard	Union	1857	No election. Union loss.	None.
Tennessee 3	George W. Bridges	Union	1861	No election. Union loss.	None.
Tennessee 4	A. J. Clements	Union	1861	No election. Union loss.	None.
Tennessee 5	Vacant			Seat vacant since June 8, 1861. No election.	None.
Tennessee 6	Vacant			Seat vacant since June 8, 1861. No election.	None.
Tennessee 7	Vacant			Seat vacant since June 8, 1861. No election.	None.
Tennessee 8	Vacant			Seat vacant since June 8, 1861. No election.	None.

== Texas ==
Texas did not hold elections as a result of secession.

District	Incumbent			This race	
District	Member	Party	First elected	Results	Candidates
Texas 1	Vacant			Seat vacant since February 1, 1861. No election.	None.
Texas 2	Vacant			Seat vacant since February 1, 1861. No election.	None.
Texas 3	Vacant			Seat vacant since February 1, 1861. No election.	None.
Texas 4	Vacant			Seat vacant since February 1, 1861. No election.	None.

== Utah Territory ==
See non-voting delegates, below.

== Vermont ==
Vermont elected its members on September 1, 1863, after the term began but before the Congress convened.

District	Incumbent			This race	
District	Member	Party	First elected	Results	Candidates
Vermont 1	E. P. Walton	Republican	1856	Incumbent retired. Republican hold.	▌ ✓ Frederick E. Woodbridge (Republican) 69.18%; ▌John A. White (Democratic) 27.18%; ▌Loyal C. Kellogg (Independent Republican) 3.64%
Vermont 2	Justin S. Morrill	Republican	1854	Incumbent re-elected.	▌ ✓ Justin S. Morrill (Republican) 70.42%; ▌Charles N. Davenport (Democratic) 29.55%; ▌Peter T. Washburn (Unknown) 0.02%; Scattering 0.04%
Vermont 3	Portus Baxter	Republican	1860	Incumbent re-elected.	▌ ✓ Portus Baxter (Republican) 70.96%; ▌Giles Harrington (Democratic) 26.22%; ▌George J. Stannard (Unknown) 2.38%; ▌William Sewall (Unknown) 0.22%; ▌J. H. Woodward (Unknown) 0.03%; Scattering 0.18%

== Virginia ==
The Restored Government of Virginia held elections in three districts on May 28, 1863, after the term began but before Congress convened. The elected members were not seated by the House.

District	Incumbent			This race	
District	Member	Party	First elected	Results	Candidates
Virginia 1	Joseph Segar	Union	1862 (special)	Incumbent re-elected but not seated. Union loss.	▌ ✓ Joseph Segar (Unknown)
Virginia 2	Vacant			Seat vacant since April 17, 1861. Winner not seated.	▌ ✓ Lucius H. Chandler (Unknown) 100.00%
Virginia 3	Vacant			Seat vacant since April 17, 1861. Winner not seated.	None.
Virginia 4	Vacant			Seat vacant since April 17, 1861. Winner not seated.	None.
Virginia 5	Vacant			Seat vacant since April 17, 1861. Winner not seated.	None.
Virginia 6	Vacant			Seat vacant since April 17, 1861. Winner not seated.	None.
Virginia 7	Lewis McKenzie	Union	1863 (special)	Incumbent lost re-election. Winner not seated. Union loss.	▌ ✓ Bethuel Kitchen (Unknown) 46.77%; ▌Lewis McKenzie (Unknown) 34.81%; ▌[FNU] Gallagher (Unknown) 13.03%; ▌Charles H. Upton (Unknown) 5.40%
Virginia 8	Vacant			Seat vacant since April 17, 1861. No election.	None.
Virginia 9	Vacant			Seat vacant since April 17, 1861. No election. Seat transferred to West Virginia on June 20, 1863; see below.	None.
Virginia 10	William G. Brown Sr.	Union	1861	No election. Union loss. Seat transferred to West Virginia on June 20, 1863; see below.	None.
Virginia 11	John S. Carlile	Union	1861	No election. Union loss. Seat transferred to West Virginia on June 20, 1863; see below.	None.

== Washington Territory ==
See non-voting delegates, below.

== West Virginia ==
West Virginia elected its members on October 22, 1863, after the term began but before the Congress convened. The state and its congressional districts had formed part of Western Virginia before being admitted to the Union on June 20, 1863, with the consent of the Restored Government of Virginia. The West Virginian members were seated on December 7, 1863.

District	Incumbent			This race	
District	Member	Party	First elected	Results	Candidates
West Virginia 1	None (new seat)			New seat. Union gain.	▌ ✓ Jacob B. Blair (Union) 93.02%; ▌Wills DeHass (Union) 6.98%
West Virginia 2	None (new seat)			New seat. Union gain.	▌ ✓ William G. Brown Sr. (Union) 57.86%; ▌John S. Burdett (Union) 29.19%; ▌William B. Zinn (Union) 12.94%
West Virginia 3	None (new seat)			New seat. Union gain.	▌ ✓ Kellian Whaley (Union) 55.72%; ▌Daniel E. Frost (Union) 44.28%

== Wisconsin ==
Wisconsin elected its members on November 4, 1862.

District	Incumbent			This race	
District	Member	Party	First elected	Results	Candidates
Wisconsin 1	John F. Potter	Republican	1856	Incumbent lost re-election. Democratic gain.	▌ ✓ James S. Brown (Democratic) 55.56%; ▌John F. Potter (Republican) 44.44%
Wisconsin 2	None (new seat)			New seat. Republican gain.	▌ ✓ Ithamar Sloan (Republican) 54.43%; ▌Joshua J. Guppey (Democratic) 45.57%
Wisconsin 3	A. Scott Sloan	Republican	1860	Incumbent retired. Republican hold.	▌ ✓ Amasa Cobb (Republican) 57.11%; ▌Philemon Simpson (Democratic) 42.89%
Wisconsin 4	None (new seat)			New seat. Democratic gain.	▌ ✓ Charles A. Eldredge (Democratic) 61.50%; ▌Edward S. Bragg (Republican) 38.50%
Wisconsin 5	None (new seat)			New seat. Democratic gain.	▌ ✓ Ezra Wheeler (Democratic) 52.42%; ▌Edward L. Browne (Republican) 47.58%
Wisconsin 6	Luther Hanchett; Redistricted from the 2nd district	Republican	1860	Incumbent re-elected. Incumbent died November 23, 1862, after winning re-election, leading to two special elections; see above.	▌ ✓ Luther Hanchett (Republican) 57.53%; ▌Thomas Benton Stoddard (Democratic) 42.47%

== Non-voting delegates ==
District	Incumbent			This race	
District	Delegate	Party	First elected	Results	Candidates
Colorado Territory at-large	Hiram P. Bennet	Republican	1861	Incumbent re-elected as a Unionist. Union gain.	▌ ✓ Hiram P. Bennet (Union) 42.07%; ▌J. M. Francisco (Democratic) 31.74%; ▌William Gilpin (People's) 26.19%
Dakota Territory at-large	John B. S. Todd	Independent	1861	Incumbent lost re-election. Republican & Union gain.	▌ ✓ William Jayne (Republican & Union) 62.16%; ▌John B. S. Todd (People's Union) 37.84%
Idaho Territory at-large	None (new seat)			New seat. Union gain.	▌ ✓ William H. Wallace (Union) 54.12%; ▌J. M. Cannaday (Democratic) 45.88%
Nebraska Territory at-large	Samuel G. Daily	Republican	1859	Incumbent re-elected.	▌ ✓ Samuel G. Daily (Republican) 51.70%; ▌John F. Kinney (Democratic) 48.30% (Note: "Judge Kinney is the newly elected Mormon Representative from Utah. [...] He ran last fall for Member of Congress in Nebraska Territory, on the Democratic ticket, and was beaten by Samuel G. Daley.")
Nevada Territory at-large	John Cradlebaugh	Independent Union	1861	Incumbent retired. Republican gain.	▌ ✓ Gordon N. Mott (Republican) 42.34%; ▌J. D. Winters (Democratic) 26.49%; ▌J. H. Ralston (Unknown) 20.68%; ▌J. J. Mussner (Unknown) 10.49%
New Mexico Territory at-large	John S. Watts	Republican	1861	Incumbent retired. Republican hold.	▌ ✓ Francisco Perea (Republican) 52.95%; ▌José M. Gallegos (Democratic) 47.05%
Utah Territory at-large	John M. Bernhisel	Independent	1861	Incumbent retired. Democratic gain.	▌ ✓ John F. Kinney (Democratic) **
Washington Territory at-large	William H. Wallace	Republican	1861	Incumbent retired. Democratic gain.	▌ ✓ George E. Cole (Democratic) 50.04%; ▌J. O. Raynor (Republican) 45.03%; Scattering 3.93%

== See also ==
- 1862 United States elections
  - 1862–63 United States Senate elections
- 37th United States Congress
- 38th United States Congress

== Bibliography ==
=== Primary sources ===
- Annual Cyclopaedia (1863). The American Annual Cyclopaedia and Register of Important Events of the Year 1862. New York: D. Appleton & Co.
- Emancipation Convention (1862). Proceedings of the Emancipation Convention [...]. St. Louis.
- Evening Journal Almanac (1863). The Evening Journal Almanac: 1863. Albany.
- Evening Journal Almanac (1864). The Evening Journal Almanac: 1864. Albany.
- Greeley, Horace, ed. (1863). The Tribune Almanac and Political Register for 1863. New York.
- Greeley, Horace, ed. (1864). The Tribune Almanac and Political Register for 1864. New York.

=== Secondary sources ===
- Allardice, Bruce S. (Spring–Summer 2011). "'Illinois is Rotten with Traitors!' The Republican Defeat in the 1862 State Election". Journal of the Illinois State Historical Society. 104 (1/2): 97–114. JSTOR 41201305.
- Anderson, Kristen Layne (2016). Abolitionizing Missouri: German Immigrants and Racial Ideology in Nineteenth-Century America. Baton Rouge: Louisiana State University Press. ISBN 978-0-8071-6198-2.
- Baker, Jean H. (1973). The Politics of Continuity: Maryland Political Parties from 1858 to 1870. Baltimore: Johns Hopkins University. p. 62. ISBN 978-0-8018-1418-1.
- Clymer, Adam (October 18, 2013). "Thomas Foley, House Speaker, Dies at 84". New York Times.
- Dubin, Michael J. (March 1, 1998). United States Congressional Elections, 1788–1997: The Official Results of the Elections of the 1st through 105th Congresses. Jefferson, N.C.: McFarland and Company. ISBN 978-0-7864-0283-0.
- Ferril, Will C., ed. (1911). Sketches of Colorado. Denver: Western Press Bureau Company.
- Harris, Wilmer C. (1917). Public Life of Zachariah Chandler, 1851–1875. n.p.: Michigan Historical Commission.
- Holt, Michael F. (1992). Political Parties and American Political Development: From the Age of Jackson to the Age of Lincoln. Baton Rouge: Louisiana State University Press. ISBN 978-0-8071-1728-6.
- Hood, James Larry (July 1978). "For the Union: Kentucky's Unconditional Unionist Congressmen and the Development of the Republican Party in Kentucky, 1863–1865". Register of the Kentucky Historical Society. 76 (3): 197–215. JSTOR 23378981.
- Kingsbury, George W. (1915). History of Dakota Territory. Vol. 1. Chicago: S. J. Clarke Publishing Company.
- Linn, John Blair (1883). History of Centre and Clinton Counties, Pennsylvania. Philadelphia.
- Mering, John (April 1959). "The Political Transition of James S. Rollins". Missouri Historical Review. 53 (3): 217–226.
- McPherson, James M. (1988). Battle Cry of Freedom: The Civil War Era. New York: Oxford University.
- Nalty, Sean (2012). "'Come Weal, Come Woe, I Am With the Anti-Slavery Party': Federalism and the Formation of the Pennsylvania Union Party, 1860–1864". In Gallagher, Gary W.; Shelden, Rachel A. (eds.). A Political Nation: New Directions in Mid-Nineteenth-Century American Political History. Charlottesville: University of Virginia Press. pp. 143–66. ISBN 978-0-8139-3282-8.
- Parrish, William E. (1971). A History of Missouri, Volume 3: 1860 to 1875. Columbia: University of Missouri Press. ISBN 978-0-8262-0108-9.
- Parrish, William E. (1963). Turbulent Partnership: Missouri and the Union, 1861–1865. Columbia, MO: University of Missouri Press. LCCN 63-8072.
- Ponce, Pearl T., ed. (2011). Kansas's War: The Civil War in Documents. Athens: Ohio University Press.
- Silbey, Joel H. (1977). A Respectable Minority: The Democratic Party in the Civil War Era, 1860–1868. New York: W. W. Norton and Company. ISBN 978-0-393-05648-8.
- Smith, Adam I. P. (2006). No Party Now: Politics in the Civil War North. New York: Oxford University Press. ISBN 978-0-19-518865-3.
- Stone, William Fisk (1918). History of Colorado. Vol. 1. Chicago: S. J. Clarke Publishing Company.
- State of Vermont (2024). "Election Results Archive". Vermont Official State Website.
