= Kentucky's 2nd congressional district =

U.S. House district for Kentucky

Coordinates: 37°32′41″N 85°59′26″W

- Interactive map of district boundaries since January 3, 2023
- Representative: Brett Guthrie; R–Bowling Green
- Distribution: 57.53% urban; 42.47% rural
- Population (2025): 785,318
- Median household income: $70,188
- Ethnicity: 83.5% White; 5.4% Black; 4.2% Hispanic; 4.1% Two or more races; 2.0% Asian; 0.7% other
- Cook PVI: R+20

Kentucky's 2nd congressional district is a congressional district in the U.S. state of Kentucky. Located in west central Kentucky, the district includes Bowling Green, Owensboro, Elizabethtown, and a portion of eastern Louisville. The district has not seen an incumbent defeated since 1884.

The district is currently represented by Republican Brett Guthrie.

Former Representative Democrat William Natcher is noted for holding the record for most consecutive roll call votes in the history of Congress—more than 18,000 votes.

== Characteristics ==
The district is similar in character to the 1st district. While Democrats still hold most local offices in the district, they tend to be very conservative on social issues, a trend that leads them to vote Republican in most national elections.

== Voter registration ==
On January 1, 2026, the district had 552,548 registered voters, who were registered with the following parties.

Party	Registration	
Party	Voters	%
Republican	286,199	51.80
Democratic	205,799	37.25
Independent	26,809	4.85
Libertarian	2,743	0.50
Green	408	0.07
Constitution	308	0.06
Socialist Workers	94	0.02
Reform	44	0.01
"Other"	30,144	5.46
Total	552,548	100.00

== Recent election results from statewide races ==
Year	Office	Results
2008	President	McCain 60% - 38%
2012	President	Romney 64% - 36%
2016	President	Trump 68% - 28%
2016	Senate	Paul 61% - 39%
2019	Governor	Bevin 54% - 44%
2019	Attorney General	Cameron 64% - 36%
2020	President	Trump 67% - 31%
2020	Senate	McConnell 62% - 33%
2022	Senate	Paul 68% - 32%
2023	Governor	Cameron 54% - 46%
2023	Attorney General	Coleman 64% - 36%
2023	Auditor of Public Accounts	Ball 66% - 34%
2023	Secretary of State	Adams 66% - 34%
2023	Treasurer	Metcalf 63% - 37%
2024	President	Trump 70% - 29%

== Composition ==
For the 118th and successive Congresses (based on redistricting following the 2020 census), the district contains all or portions of the following counties and communities:

Barren County (4)

All 4 communities

Breckinridge County (3)

All 3 communities

Bullitt County (9)

All 9 communities

Butler County (3)

All 3 communities

Daviess County (10)

All 10 communities

Edmondson County (1)

Brownsville

Grayson County (4)

All 4 communities

Green County (2)

Greensburg, Summersville

Hancock County (2)

Hawesville, Lewisport

Hardin County (10)

All 10 communities

Hart County (3)

All 3 communities

Jefferson County (2)

Louisville (part; also 3rd), Middletown (part; also 3rd)

LaRue County (4)

All 4 communities

Logan County (1)

Auburn

McLean County (5)

All 5 communities

Meade County (5)

All 5 communities

Muhlenberg County (10)

All 10 communities

Nelson County (4)

Bardstown (part; also 4th), Boston, New Haven, New Hope

Ohio County (7)

All 7 communities

Warren County (6)

All 6 communities

== List of members representing the district ==
Member	Party	Years	Cong ress	Electoral history	Location
District created November 8, 1792
Alexander D. Orr (Maysville)	Anti-Administration	November 8, 1792 – March 3, 1795	2nd 3rd 4th	Elected September 7, 1792. Re-elected in 1793. Re-elected in 1795. Retired.	1792–1797: "Northern district": Bourbon, Fayette, Mason, Scott, and Woodford counties
Alexander D. Orr (Maysville)	Democratic-Republican	March 4, 1795 – March 3, 1797	2nd 3rd 4th	Elected September 7, 1792. Re-elected in 1793. Re-elected in 1795. Retired.	1792–1797: "Northern district": Bourbon, Fayette, Mason, Scott, and Woodford counties
John Fowler (Lexington)	Democratic-Republican	March 4, 1797 – March 3, 1803	5th 6th 7th	Elected in 1797. Re-elected in 1799. Re-elected in 1801. Redistricted to the 5th district.	1797–1803: "Northern district": Bourbon, Campbell, Clark, Fayette, Franklin, Harrison, Mason, Scott, and Woodford counties
John Boyle (Lancaster)	Democratic-Republican	March 4, 1803 – March 3, 1809	8th 9th 10th	Elected in 1803. Re-elected in 1804. Re-elected in 1806. Retired.	1803–1813 [data missing]
Samuel McKee (Lancaster)	Democratic-Republican	March 4, 1809 – March 3, 1813	11th 12th	Elected in 1808. Re-elected in 1810. Redistricted to the 7th district.	1803–1813 [data missing]
Henry Clay (Lexington)	Democratic-Republican	March 4, 1813 – January 19, 1814	13th	Redistricted from the 5th district and re-elected in 1812. Resigned to accept a position as diplomatic envoy to Great Britain.	1813–1823 [data missing]
Vacant		January 19, 1814 – March 29, 1814	13th		1813–1823 [data missing]
Joseph H. Hawkins (Lexington)	Democratic-Republican	March 29, 1814 – March 3, 1815	13th	Elected to finish Clay's term. Retired.	1813–1823 [data missing]
Vacant		March 3, 1815 – October 30, 1815	14th	Henry Clay was re-elected in 1814, but the Governor declared the seat vacant as Clay was out of the country.	1813–1823 [data missing]
Henry Clay (Lexington)	Democratic-Republican	October 30, 1815 – March 3, 1821	14th 15th 16th	Elected to finish his vacant term. Re-elected in 1816. Re-elected in 1818. Retired.	1813–1823 [data missing]
Samuel H. Woodson (Lexington)	Democratic-Republican	March 4, 1821 – March 3, 1823	17th	Elected in 1820. Redistricted to the 7th district and lost re-election.	1813–1823 [data missing]
Thomas Metcalfe (Carlisle)	Democratic-Republican	March 3, 1823 – March 3, 1825	18th 19th 20th	Redistricted from the 4th district and re-elected in 1822. Re-elected in 1824. Re-elected in 1827. Resigned to run for Governor of Kentucky.	1823–1833; Bourbon, Bracken, Mason, Nicholas counties
Thomas Metcalfe (Carlisle)	Anti-Jacksonian	March 4, 1825 – June 1, 1828	18th 19th 20th	Redistricted from the 4th district and re-elected in 1822. Re-elected in 1824. Re-elected in 1827. Resigned to run for Governor of Kentucky.	1823–1833; Bourbon, Bracken, Mason, Nicholas counties
Vacant		June 1, 1828 – December 1, 1828	20th		1823–1833; Bourbon, Bracken, Mason, Nicholas counties
John Chambers (Washington)	Anti-Jacksonian	December 1, 1828 – March 3, 1829	20th	Elected to finish Metcalfe's term. Retired.	1823–1833; Bourbon, Bracken, Mason, Nicholas counties
Nicholas D. Coleman (Washington)	Jacksonian	March 4, 1829 – March 3, 1831	21st	Elected in 1829. Retired.	1823–1833; Bourbon, Bracken, Mason, Nicholas counties
Thomas A. Marshall (Paris)	Anti-Jacksonian	March 4, 1831 – March 3, 1833	22nd	Elected in 1831. Redistricted to the 12th district.	1823–1833; Bourbon, Bracken, Mason, Nicholas counties
Albert G. Hawes (Hawesville)	Jacksonian	March 4, 1833 – March 3, 1837	23rd 24th	Redistricted from the 11th district and re-elected in 1833. Re-elected in 1835. Retired.	1833–1843 [data missing]
Edward Rumsey (Greenville)	Whig	March 4, 1837 – March 3, 1839	25th	Elected in 1837. Retired.	1833–1843 [data missing]
Philip Triplett (Owensboro)	Whig	March 4, 1839 – March 3, 1843	26th 27th	Elected in 1839. Re-elected in 1841. Retired.	1833–1843 [data missing]
Willis Green (Green)	Whig	March 4, 1843 – March 3, 1845	28th	Redistricted from the 6th district and re-elected in 1843. Retired.	1843–1853 [data missing]
John H. McHenry (Hartford)	Whig	March 4, 1845 – March 3, 1847	29th	Elected in 1845. Renominated but withdrew prior to election.	1843–1853 [data missing]
Beverly L. Clarke (Franklin)	Democratic	March 4, 1847 – March 3, 1849	30th	Elected in 1847. Retired to become a delegate to the state constitutional convention.	1843–1853 [data missing]
James L. Johnson (Owensboro)	Whig	March 4, 1849 – March 3, 1851	31st	Elected in 1849. Renominated but declined.	1843–1853 [data missing]
Benjamin E. Grey (Hopkinsville)	Whig	March 4, 1851 – March 3, 1855	32nd 33rd	Elected in 1851. Re-elected in 1853. Lost re-election.	1843–1853 [data missing]
Benjamin E. Grey (Hopkinsville)	Whig	March 4, 1851 – March 3, 1855	32nd 33rd	Elected in 1851. Re-elected in 1853. Lost re-election.	1853–1863 [data missing]
John P. Campbell Jr. (Belleview)	Know Nothing	March 4, 1855 – March 3, 1857	34th	Elected in 1855. Renominated but declined.	1853–1863 [data missing]
Samuel Peyton (Hartford)	Democratic	March 4, 1857 – March 3, 1861	35th 36th	Elected in 1857. Re-elected in 1859. Lost renomination.	1853–1863 [data missing]
James S. Jackson (Hopkinsville)	Union Democratic	March 4, 1861 – December 13, 1861	37th	Elected in 1861. Resigned to enter the Union Army.	1853–1863 [data missing]
Vacant		December 13, 1861 – December 1, 1862	37th		1853–1863 [data missing]
George H. Yeaman (Owensboro)	Union Democratic	December 1, 1862 – March 3, 1865	37th 38th	Elected to finish Jackson's term. Re-elected in 1863. Lost re-election.	1853–1863 [data missing]
George H. Yeaman (Owensboro)	Union Democratic	December 1, 1862 – March 3, 1865	37th 38th	Elected to finish Jackson's term. Re-elected in 1863. Lost re-election.	1863–1873 [data missing]
Burwell C. Ritter (Hopkinsville)	Democratic	March 4, 1865 – March 3, 1867	39th	Elected in 1865. Retired.	1863–1873 [data missing]
Vacant		March 4, 1867 – March 3, 1869	40th	John Y. Brown was elected in 1867 but the seat was declared vacant due to Brown's alleged disloyalty during the Civil War, and the district refused to elect anyone to fill the vacancy.	1863–1873 [data missing]
William N. Sweeney (Owensboro)	Democratic	March 4, 1869 – March 3, 1871	41st	Elected in 1868. Renominated but declined.	1863–1873 [data missing]
Henry D. McHenry (Hartford)	Democratic	March 4, 1871 – March 3, 1873	42nd	Elected in 1870. Retired.	1863–1873 [data missing]
John Y. Brown (Henderson)	Democratic	March 4, 1873 – March 3, 1877	43rd 44th	Elected in 1872. Re-elected in 1874. Retired.	1873–1883 [data missing]
James A. McKenzie (Long View)	Democratic	March 4, 1877 – March 3, 1883	45th 46th 47th	Elected in 1876. Re-elected in 1878. Re-elected in 1880. Lost renomination.	1873–1883 [data missing]
James F. Clay (Henderson)	Democratic	March 4, 1883 – March 3, 1885	48th	Elected in 1882. Lost renomination.	1883–1893 [data missing]
Polk Laffoon (Madisonville)	Democratic	March 4, 1885 – March 3, 1889	49th 50th	Elected in 1884. Re-elected in 1886. Retired.	1883–1893 [data missing]
William T. Ellis (Owensboro)	Democratic	March 4, 1889 – March 3, 1895	51st 52nd 53rd	Elected in 1888. Re-elected in 1890. Re-elected in 1892. Retired.	1883–1893 [data missing]
William T. Ellis (Owensboro)	Democratic	March 4, 1889 – March 3, 1895	51st 52nd 53rd	Elected in 1888. Re-elected in 1890. Re-elected in 1892. Retired.	1893–1903 [data missing]
John D. Clardy (Newstead)	Democratic	March 4, 1895 – March 3, 1899	54th 55th	Elected in 1894. Re-elected in 1896. Retired.	1893–1903 [data missing]
Henry D. Allen (Morganfield)	Democratic	March 4, 1899 – March 3, 1903	56th 57th	Elected in 1898. Re-elected in 1900. Retired.	1893–1903 [data missing]
Augustus O. Stanley (Henderson)	Democratic	March 4, 1903 – March 3, 1915	58th 59th 60th 61st 62nd 63rd	Elected in 1902. Re-elected in 1904. Re-elected in 1906. Re-elected in 1908. Re-elected in 1910. Re-elected in 1912. Retired to run for U.S. Senator.	1903–1913 [data missing]
Augustus O. Stanley (Henderson)	Democratic	March 4, 1903 – March 3, 1915	58th 59th 60th 61st 62nd 63rd	Elected in 1902. Re-elected in 1904. Re-elected in 1906. Re-elected in 1908. Re-elected in 1910. Re-elected in 1912. Retired to run for U.S. Senator.	1913–1933
David H. Kincheloe (Madisonville)	Democratic	March 4, 1915 – October 5, 1930	64th 65th 66th 67th 68th 69th 70th 71st	Elected in 1914. Re-elected in 1916. Re-elected in 1918. Re-elected in 1920. Re-elected in 1922. Re-elected in 1924. Re-elected in 1926. Re-elected in 1928. Resigned when appointed to the U.S. Customs Court.	1913–1933
Vacant		October 5, 1930 – November 4, 1930	71st		1913–1933
John L. Dorsey Jr. (Henderson)	Democratic	November 4, 1930 – March 3, 1931	71st	Elected to finish Kincheloe's term. Retired.	1913–1933
Glover H. Cary (Owensboro)	Democratic	March 4, 1931 – March 3, 1933	72nd	Elected in 1930. Redistricted to the at-large district.	1913–1933
District inactive		March 4, 1933 – March 3, 1935	73rd		
Glover H. Cary (Owensboro)	Democratic	March 4, 1935 – December 5, 1936	74th	Redistricted from the at-large district and re-elected in 1934. Died.	1935–1953
Vacant		December 5, 1936 – March 2, 1937	74th		1935–1953
Beverly M. Vincent (Brownsville)	Democratic	March 2, 1937 – January 3, 1945	74th 75th 76th 77th 78th	Elected to finish Cary's term. Also elected to the next full term. Re-elected in 1938. Re-elected in 1940. Re-elected in 1942. Retired.	1935–1953
Earle Clements (Morganfield)	Democratic	January 3, 1945 – January 6, 1948	79th 80th	Elected in 1944. Re-elected in 1946. Resigned when elected Governor of Kentucky.	1935–1953
Vacant		January 6, 1948 – April 17, 1948	80th		1935–1953
John A. Whitaker (Russellville)	Democratic	April 17, 1948 – December 15, 1951	80th 81st 82nd	Elected to finish Clements's term. Re-elected in 1948. Re-elected in 1950. Died.	1935–1953
Vacant		December 15, 1951 – August 2, 1952	82nd		1935–1953
Garrett Withers (Dixon)	Democratic	August 2, 1952 – April 30, 1953	82nd 83rd	Elected to finish Whitaker's term. Re-elected later in 1952. Died.	1935–1953
Garrett Withers (Dixon)	Democratic	August 2, 1952 – April 30, 1953	82nd 83rd	Elected to finish Whitaker's term. Re-elected later in 1952. Died.	1953–1957
Vacant		April 30, 1953 – August 1, 1953	83rd		1953–1957
William Natcher (Bowling Green)	Democratic	August 1, 1953 – March 29, 1994	83rd 84th 85th 86th 87th 88th 89th 90th 91st 92nd 93rd 94th 95th 96th 97th 98th 99th 100th 101st 102nd 103rd	Elected to finish Wither's term. Re-elected in 1954. Re-elected in 1956. Re-elected in 1958. Re-elected in 1960. Re-elected in 1962. Re-elected in 1964. Re-elected in 1966. Re-elected in 1968. Re-elected in 1970. Re-elected in 1972. Re-elected in 1974. Re-elected in 1976. Re-elected in 1978. Re-elected in 1980. Re-elected in 1982. Re-elected in 1984. Re-elected in 1986. Re-elected in 1988. Re-elected in 1990. Re-elected in 1992. Died.	1953–1957
William Natcher (Bowling Green)	Democratic	August 1, 1953 – March 29, 1994	83rd 84th 85th 86th 87th 88th 89th 90th 91st 92nd 93rd 94th 95th 96th 97th 98th 99th 100th 101st 102nd 103rd	Elected to finish Wither's term. Re-elected in 1954. Re-elected in 1956. Re-elected in 1958. Re-elected in 1960. Re-elected in 1962. Re-elected in 1964. Re-elected in 1966. Re-elected in 1968. Re-elected in 1970. Re-elected in 1972. Re-elected in 1974. Re-elected in 1976. Re-elected in 1978. Re-elected in 1980. Re-elected in 1982. Re-elected in 1984. Re-elected in 1986. Re-elected in 1988. Re-elected in 1990. Re-elected in 1992. Died.	1957–1963
William Natcher (Bowling Green)	Democratic	August 1, 1953 – March 29, 1994	83rd 84th 85th 86th 87th 88th 89th 90th 91st 92nd 93rd 94th 95th 96th 97th 98th 99th 100th 101st 102nd 103rd	Elected to finish Wither's term. Re-elected in 1954. Re-elected in 1956. Re-elected in 1958. Re-elected in 1960. Re-elected in 1962. Re-elected in 1964. Re-elected in 1966. Re-elected in 1968. Re-elected in 1970. Re-elected in 1972. Re-elected in 1974. Re-elected in 1976. Re-elected in 1978. Re-elected in 1980. Re-elected in 1982. Re-elected in 1984. Re-elected in 1986. Re-elected in 1988. Re-elected in 1990. Re-elected in 1992. Died.	1963–1967
William Natcher (Bowling Green)	Democratic	August 1, 1953 – March 29, 1994	83rd 84th 85th 86th 87th 88th 89th 90th 91st 92nd 93rd 94th 95th 96th 97th 98th 99th 100th 101st 102nd 103rd	Elected to finish Wither's term. Re-elected in 1954. Re-elected in 1956. Re-elected in 1958. Re-elected in 1960. Re-elected in 1962. Re-elected in 1964. Re-elected in 1966. Re-elected in 1968. Re-elected in 1970. Re-elected in 1972. Re-elected in 1974. Re-elected in 1976. Re-elected in 1978. Re-elected in 1980. Re-elected in 1982. Re-elected in 1984. Re-elected in 1986. Re-elected in 1988. Re-elected in 1990. Re-elected in 1992. Died.	1967–1973
William Natcher (Bowling Green)	Democratic	August 1, 1953 – March 29, 1994	83rd 84th 85th 86th 87th 88th 89th 90th 91st 92nd 93rd 94th 95th 96th 97th 98th 99th 100th 101st 102nd 103rd	Elected to finish Wither's term. Re-elected in 1954. Re-elected in 1956. Re-elected in 1958. Re-elected in 1960. Re-elected in 1962. Re-elected in 1964. Re-elected in 1966. Re-elected in 1968. Re-elected in 1970. Re-elected in 1972. Re-elected in 1974. Re-elected in 1976. Re-elected in 1978. Re-elected in 1980. Re-elected in 1982. Re-elected in 1984. Re-elected in 1986. Re-elected in 1988. Re-elected in 1990. Re-elected in 1992. Died.	1973–1983
William Natcher (Bowling Green)	Democratic	August 1, 1953 – March 29, 1994	83rd 84th 85th 86th 87th 88th 89th 90th 91st 92nd 93rd 94th 95th 96th 97th 98th 99th 100th 101st 102nd 103rd	Elected to finish Wither's term. Re-elected in 1954. Re-elected in 1956. Re-elected in 1958. Re-elected in 1960. Re-elected in 1962. Re-elected in 1964. Re-elected in 1966. Re-elected in 1968. Re-elected in 1970. Re-elected in 1972. Re-elected in 1974. Re-elected in 1976. Re-elected in 1978. Re-elected in 1980. Re-elected in 1982. Re-elected in 1984. Re-elected in 1986. Re-elected in 1988. Re-elected in 1990. Re-elected in 1992. Died.	1983–1993
William Natcher (Bowling Green)	Democratic	August 1, 1953 – March 29, 1994	83rd 84th 85th 86th 87th 88th 89th 90th 91st 92nd 93rd 94th 95th 96th 97th 98th 99th 100th 101st 102nd 103rd	Elected to finish Wither's term. Re-elected in 1954. Re-elected in 1956. Re-elected in 1958. Re-elected in 1960. Re-elected in 1962. Re-elected in 1964. Re-elected in 1966. Re-elected in 1968. Re-elected in 1970. Re-elected in 1972. Re-elected in 1974. Re-elected in 1976. Re-elected in 1978. Re-elected in 1980. Re-elected in 1982. Re-elected in 1984. Re-elected in 1986. Re-elected in 1988. Re-elected in 1990. Re-elected in 1992. Died.	1993–1997
Vacant		March 29, 1994 – May 24, 1994	103rd		1993–1997
Ron Lewis (Cecilia)	Republican	May 24, 1994 – January 3, 2009	103rd 104th 105th 106th 107th 108th 109th 110th	Elected to finish Natcher's term. Re-elected in 1994. Re-elected in 1996. Re-elected in 1998. Re-elected in 2000. Re-elected in 2002. Re-elected in 2004. Re-elected in 2006. Retired.	1993–1997
Ron Lewis (Cecilia)	Republican	May 24, 1994 – January 3, 2009	103rd 104th 105th 106th 107th 108th 109th 110th	Elected to finish Natcher's term. Re-elected in 1994. Re-elected in 1996. Re-elected in 1998. Re-elected in 2000. Re-elected in 2002. Re-elected in 2004. Re-elected in 2006. Retired.	1997–2003
Ron Lewis (Cecilia)	Republican	May 24, 1994 – January 3, 2009	103rd 104th 105th 106th 107th 108th 109th 110th	Elected to finish Natcher's term. Re-elected in 1994. Re-elected in 1996. Re-elected in 1998. Re-elected in 2000. Re-elected in 2002. Re-elected in 2004. Re-elected in 2006. Retired.	2003–2013
Brett Guthrie (Bowling Green)	Republican	January 3, 2009 – present	111th 112th 113th 114th 115th 116th 117th 118th 119th	Elected in 2008. Re-elected in 2010. Re-elected in 2012. Re-elected in 2014. Re-elected in 2016. Re-elected in 2018. Re-elected in 2020. Re-elected in 2022. Re-elected in 2024. Re-elected in 2026.	2003–2013
Brett Guthrie (Bowling Green)	Republican	January 3, 2009 – present	111th 112th 113th 114th 115th 116th 117th 118th 119th	Elected in 2008. Re-elected in 2010. Re-elected in 2012. Re-elected in 2014. Re-elected in 2016. Re-elected in 2018. Re-elected in 2020. Re-elected in 2022. Re-elected in 2024. Re-elected in 2026.	2013–2023 21 Counties (Note: Barren, Boyle, Breckinridge, Bullitt, Butler, Daviess, Edmonson, Garrard, Grayson, Green, Hancock, Hardin, Hart, Jessamine (part), LaRue, Meade, Mercer, Nelson, Spencer (part), Warren, and Washington (part) Counties.)
Brett Guthrie (Bowling Green)	Republican	January 3, 2009 – present	111th 112th 113th 114th 115th 116th 117th 118th 119th	Elected in 2008. Re-elected in 2010. Re-elected in 2012. Re-elected in 2014. Re-elected in 2016. Re-elected in 2018. Re-elected in 2020. Re-elected in 2022. Re-elected in 2024. Re-elected in 2026.	2023–present

== Recent election results ==
=== 2002 ===
2002 Kentucky's 2nd congressional district election)
Party	Candidate	Votes	%
Republican	Ron Lewis (Incumbent)	122,773	69.64%
Democratic	David Lynn Williams	51,431	29.17%
Libertarian	Robert Guy Dyer	2,084	1.18%
Total votes		176,288	100.00%
Turnout			
Republican hold			

=== 2004 ===
2004 Kentucky's 2nd congressional district election
Party	Candidate	Votes	%
Republican	Ron Lewis (Incumbent)	185,394	67.92%
Democratic	Adam Smith	87,585	32.08%
Total votes		272,979	100.00%
Turnout			
Republican hold			

=== 2006 ===
2006 Kentucky's 2nd congressional district election
Party	Candidate	Votes	%
Republican	Ron Lewis (Incumbent)	118,548	55.41%
Democratic	Mike Weaver	95,415	44.59%
Total votes		213,963	100.00%
Turnout			
Republican hold			

=== 2008 ===
2008 Kentucky's 2nd congressional district election
Party	Candidate	Votes	%
Republican	Brett Guthrie	158,936	52.57%
Democratic	David E. Boswell	143,379	47.43%
Total votes		302,315	100.00%
Turnout			
Republican hold			

=== 2010 ===
2010 Kentucky's 2nd congressional district election
Party	Candidate	Votes	%
Republican	Brett Guthrie (Incumbent)	155,906	67.89%
Democratic	Ed Marksberry	73,749	28.75%
Total votes		229,655	100.00%
Turnout			
Republican hold			

=== 2012 ===
2012 Kentucky's 2nd congressional district election
Party	Candidate	Votes	%
Republican	Brett Guthrie (Incumbent)	181,508	64.30%
Democratic	David Lynn Williams	89,541	31.72%
Independent	Andrew R. Beacham	6,304	2.23%
Libertarian	Craig Astor	4,914	1.74%
Total votes		282,267	100.00%
Turnout			
Republican hold			

=== 2014 ===
2014 Kentucky's 2nd congressional district election
Party	Candidate	Votes	%
Republican	Brett Guthrie (Incumbent)	156,936	69.19%
Democratic	Ron Leach	69,898	30.81%
Total votes		226,834	100.00%
Turnout			
Republican hold			

=== 2016 ===
2016 Kentucky's 2nd congressional district election
Party	Candidate	Votes	%
Republican	Brett Guthrie (Incumbent)	251,823	100.00%
Total votes		251,823	100.00%
Turnout			
Republican hold			

=== 2018 ===
2018 Kentucky's 2nd congressional district election
Party	Candidate	Votes	%
Republican	Brett Guthrie (Incumbent)	171,700	66.7%
Democratic	Hank Linderman	79,964	31.1%
Independent	Thomas Loecken	5,681	2.2%
Total votes		257,345	100.0%
Republican hold			

=== 2020 ===
2020 United States House of Representatives elections in Kentucky
Party	Candidate	Votes	%
Republican	Brett Guthrie (incumbent)	255,735	70.9
Democratic	Hank Linderman	94,643	26.3
Libertarian	Robert Lee Perry	7,588	2.1
Populist	Lewis Carter	2,431	0.7
Write-in		2	0.0
Total votes		360,399	100.0
Republican hold			

=== 2022 ===
2022 United States House of Representatives elections in Kentucky
Party	Candidate	Votes	%
Republican	Brett Guthrie (incumbent)	170,487	71.8
Democratic	Hank Linderman	66,769	28.1
Total votes		237,256	100.0
Republican hold			

=== 2024 ===
2024 United States House of Representatives elections in Kentucky
Party	Candidate	Votes	%
Republican	Brett Guthrie (incumbent)	252,826	73.1
Democratic	Hank Linderman	93,029	26.9
Total votes		345,855	100.0
Republican hold			

== See also ==
- Kentucky's congressional districts
- List of United States congressional districts
