= John McHenry =

John McHenry may refer to:

- John Geiser McHenry (1868–1912), United States Representative from Pennsylvania
- John H. McHenry (1797–1871), United States Representative from Kentucky
