= William N. Sweeney =

American politician (1832–1895)

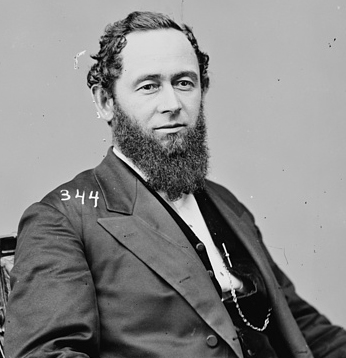

Member of the U.S. House of Representatives from Kentucky's 2nd district
- In office March 4, 1869 – March 3, 1871
- Preceded by: Burwell C. Ritter
- Succeeded by: Henry D. McHenry

Personal details
- Born: May 5, 1832 Liberty, Kentucky
- Died: April 21, 1895 (aged 62) Owensboro, Kentucky
- Resting place: Elmwood Cemetery
- Party: Democratic
- Education: Bethany College
- Profession: Lawyer

William Northcut Sweeney (May 5, 1832 – April 21, 1895) was a U.S. representative from Kentucky.

Born in Liberty, Kentucky, Sweeney attended the common schools and Bethany College. He studied law. He was admitted to the bar in 1853 and commenced practice in Liberty, Kentucky. He moved to Owensboro, Daviess County, in 1853. He served as prosecuting attorney of Daviess County 1854–1858. He served as presidential elector on the Democratic ticket of Douglas and Johnson in 1860.

Sweeney was elected as a Democrat to the Forty-first Congress (March 4, 1869 – March 3, 1871). He was renominated in 1870, but declined to accept the nomination. He resumed the practice of law in Owensboro, Kentucky, and died there April 21, 1895. He was interred in Rosehill Elmwood Cemetery.

U.S. House of Representatives
Preceded by Burwell C. Ritter	Member of the U.S. House of Representatives from Kentucky's 2nd congressional district March 4, 1869 – March 3, 1871	Succeeded by Henry D. McHenry
