= Henry D. McHenry =

American politician

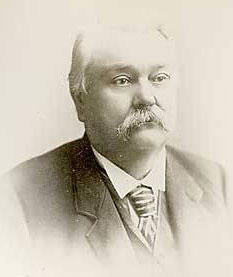
- Photo of McHenry, circa 1890

Member of the U.S. House of Representatives from Kentucky's 2nd district
- In office March 4, 1871 – March 3, 1873
- Preceded by: William N. Sweeney
- Succeeded by: John Y. Brown

Member of the Kentucky Senate from the 8th district
- In office August 5, 1861 – August 7, 1865 Serving with Claiborne J. Walton (1861–63)
- Preceded by: Claiborne J. Walton
- Succeeded by: O. P. Johnson

Member of the Kentucky House of Representatives from Ohio County
- In office August 7, 1865 – August 5, 1867
- Preceded by: W. H. Miller
- Succeeded by: W. Estill McHenry
- In office August 4, 1851 – August 1, 1853
- Preceded by: George W. Williams (Note: Representative from Hancock and Ohio counties.)
- Succeeded by: Henry Thompson

Personal details
- Born: February 27, 1826 Hartford, Kentucky
- Died: December 17, 1890 (aged 64) Hartford, Kentucky
- Resting place: Oakwood Cemetery
- Party: Democratic
- Relations: Son of John Hardin McHenry
- Education: Transylvania University
- Profession: Lawyer

Henry Davis McHenry (February 27, 1826 – December 17, 1890) was a U.S. representative from Kentucky, son of John Hardin McHenry.

Born in Hartford, Kentucky, McHenry attended the public schools at Hartford, and was graduated from the law department of Transylvania University, Lexington, Kentucky, in 1845. He was admitted to the bar in 1845 and commenced practice in Hartford. He served as member of the Kentucky House of Representatives 1851–1853 and 1865–1867. He served in the Kentucky State Senate 1861–1865. He served as member of the Democratic National Committee from 1872 until his death.

McHenry was elected as a Democrat to the Forty-second Congress (March 4, 1871 – March 3, 1873). He resumed the practice of his profession in Hartford. He served as delegate to the State constitutional convention in 1890. He died in Hartford, Kentucky, December 17, 1890. He was interred in Oakwood Cemetery. The town of McHenry, Kentucky is named in his honor.

== Notes ==
U.S. House of Representatives
Preceded by William N. Sweeney	Member of the U.S. House of Representatives from Kentucky's 2nd congressional district March 4, 1871 – March 3, 1873	Succeeded by John Y. Brown
