= John P. Campbell Jr. =

American politician

Member of the U.S. House of Representatives from Kentucky's 2nd district
- In office March 4, 1855 – March 3, 1857
- Preceded by: Benjamin E. Grey
- Succeeded by: Samuel Peyton

Member of the Missouri House of Representatives
- In office 1848–1852

Personal details
- Born: John Pierce Campbell Jr. December 8, 1820 near Hopkinsville, Kentucky, U.S.
- Died: October 29, 1888 (aged 67) Hopkinsville, Kentucky, U.S.
- Resting place: Riverside Cemetery
- Party: American
- Profession: Politician, lawyer

John Pierce Campbell Jr. (December 8, 1820 – October 29, 1888) was a U.S. representative from Kentucky.

Born near Hopkinsville, Kentucky, Campbell pursued an academic course. He studied law. He was admitted to the bar in 1841 and commenced practice in Lexington, Missouri. He served as member of the Missouri House of Representatives 1848–1852. He returned to Hopkinsville, Kentucky, and engaged in agricultural pursuits.

Campbell was elected as a candidate of the American Party to the Thirty-fourth Congress (March 4, 1855 – March 3, 1857). He declined to be a candidate for reelection. He served as president of the Henderson & Nashville Railroad in 1870. Organized the Mastodon Coal & Iron Co., which was succeeded by the St. Bernard Coal Co. Devoted the latter years of his life to his large landed estates. He died in Hopkinsville, Kentucky, October 29, 1888. He was interred in Riverside Cemetery.

U.S. House of Representatives
Preceded by Benjamin E. Grey	Member of the U.S. House of Representatives from Kentucky's 2nd congressional district March 4, 1855 – March 3, 1857	Succeeded by Samuel Peyton
