= George H. Yeaman =

American politician (1829–1908)

George H Yeaman
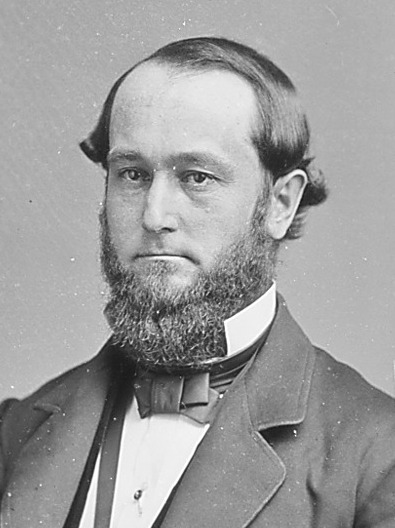

U.S. Ambassador to Denmark
- In office November 20, 1865 – November 7, 1870
- President: Andrew Johnson; Ulysses S. Grant
- Preceded by: Samuel J. Kirkwood
- Succeeded by: Christopher Columbus Andrews

Member of the U.S. House of Representatives from Kentucky's 2nd district
- In office December 1, 1862 – March 4, 1865
- Preceded by: James S. Jackson
- Succeeded by: Burwell C. Ritter

Member of the Kentucky House of Representatives
- In office 1861

Personal details
- Born: George Helm Yeaman; November 1, 1829 Hardin County, Kentucky, U.S.
- Died: February 23, 1908 (aged 78) Jersey City, New Jersey, U.S.
- Party: Union Democratic

George Helm Yeaman (November 1, 1829 – February 23, 1908) was an American politician who served as a U.S. representative from Kentucky from 1862 until 1865, and as U.S. Ambassador to Denmark from 1865 to 1870.

== Early life and education ==
Yeaman was born in Hardin County, Kentucky, the son of Lucretia Sneed (Helm) and Steven Minor Yeaman. Yeaman completed preparatory studies and studied law. He was admitted to the bar in 1852 and commenced practice in Owensboro, Kentucky. He served as judge of Daviess County in 1854 and as a member of the Kentucky House of Representatives in 1861.

== Career ==
Yeaman was elected as a Unionist to the Thirty-seventh Congress to fill the vacancy caused by the resignation of James S. Jackson. He was reelected to the Thirty-eighth Congress and served from December 1, 1862, to March 3, 1865. He was an unsuccessful candidate for reelection in 1864 to the Thirty-ninth Congress. He provided a critical vote for passing the Thirteenth Amendment to the United States Constitution abolishing slavery through the U.S. House of Representatives.

Yeaman served as the United States Minister to Denmark from 1865 to 1870. He resigned in 1870 and settled in New York City. He then served as a lecturer on constitutional law at Columbia College. He served as president of the Medico-Legal Society of New York.

Yeaman died in Jersey City, New Jersey, on February 23, 1908. He was interred at Hillside Cemetery in Madison, New Jersey.

== In film ==
In the 2012 film, Lincoln, Yeaman was played by Michael Stuhlbarg.

U.S. House of Representatives
Preceded by James S. Jackson	Member of the U.S. House of Representatives from Kentucky's 2nd congressional district 1862 – 1865	Succeeded by Burwell C. Ritter
Diplomatic posts
Preceded by Samuel J. Kirkwood	United States Ambassador to Denmark; 1865–1870	Succeeded by Christopher Columbus Andrews
