= James S. Jackson =

American politician (1823–1862)

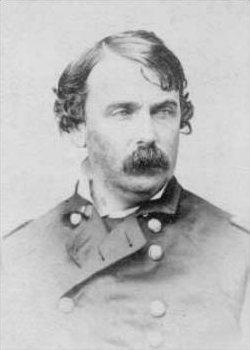

Member of the U.S. House of Representatives from Kentucky's 2nd district
- In office March 4, 1861 – December 13, 1861
- Preceded by: Samuel Peyton
- Succeeded by: George H. Yeaman

Personal details
- Born: James Streshly Jackson; September 27, 1823 Fayette County, Kentucky, U.S.
- Died: October 8, 1862 (aged 39) Boyle County, Kentucky, U.S.
- Resting place: Riverside Cemetery; Hopkinsville, Kentucky, U.S.
- Party: Unionist

Military service
- Allegiance: United States
- Branch/service: United States Army; Union Army
- Years of service: 1846; 1861-1862
- Rank: Brigadier General
- Commands: 3rd Kentucky Cavalry; 10th Division, Army of the Ohio
- Battles/wars: Mexican-American War; American Civil War; Battle of Shiloh; Siege of Corinth; Battle of Perryville †

James Streshly Jackson (September 27, 1823 – October 8, 1862) was a U.S. representative from Kentucky and a brigadier general in the Union Army during the American Civil War.

== Biography ==
Born in Fayette County, Kentucky, Jackson pursued classical studies at Centre College, Danville, Kentucky. He graduated from Jefferson College, Canonsburg, Pennsylvania, in 1844, and the following year from the law department of Transylvania University, Lexington, Kentucky. He was admitted to the bar and began practicing law in Greenupsburg, Kentucky.

During the Mexican–American War, Jackson enlisted on June 9, 1846, as a private in the 1st Kentucky Cavalry; he was elected a third lieutenant one month later. He fought a duel with Captain Thomas Francis Marshall; fearing a court martial, he resigned from the Army on October 10, 1846. In 1859, he moved to Hopkinsville from Greenupsburg. He was elected as a Unionist to the Thirty-seventh Congress and served from March 4 to December 13, 1861, when he resigned to enter the Union Army.

Jackson raised a cavalry company and was elected colonel of the 3rd Kentucky Cavalry when it was formed on December 13, 1861. He was promoted to brigadier general of volunteers on July 16, 1862. Jackson was placed in command of the 10th Division in the Army of the Ohio. He was killed in action on October 8, 1862, during the Battle of Perryville. He was buried at Cave Hill Cemetery in Louisville, but was reinterred on March 24, 1863, at Riverside Cemetery in Hopkinsville.

== See also ==
- List of American Civil War generals (Union)
- Kentucky in the American Civil War

== Bibliography ==
- United States Congress. "James S. Jackson (id: J000019)". Biographical Directory of the United States Congress. Retrieved on 2008-02-12
- Allen, William B. (1872). A History of Kentucky: Embracing Gleanings, Reminiscences, Antiquities, Natural Curiosities, Statistics, and Biographical Sketches of Pioneers, Soldiers, Jurists, Lawyers, Statesmen, Divines, Mechanics, Farmers, Merchants, and Other Leading Men, of All Occupations and Pursuits. Bradley & Gilbert. pp. 272.

U.S. House of Representatives
Preceded by Samuel Peyton	Member of the U.S. House of Representatives from Kentucky's 2nd congressional district March 4, 1861 – December 13, 1861	Succeeded by George H. Yeaman
