= Willis Green =

American politician (1818–1893)

Member of the U.S. House of Representatives
- In office March 4, 1839 – March 3, 1845
- Preceded by: John Calhoon
- Succeeded by: John H. McHenry

Member of the Kentucky House of Representatives
- In office 1836–1837

Personal details
- Born: 1818 Madison County, Kentucky, U.S.
- Died: 1893 (aged 74–75) Danville, Kentucky, U.S.
- Resting place: Cave Hill Cemetery; Louisville, Kentucky, U.S.
- Party: Whig

Willis Green (1818–1893) was a U.S. representative from Kentucky.

== Life ==
Willis Green, son of Stephen Green and Elizabeth Stuart Green, was born in Madison County, Kentucky about 1818. Willis owned a mill at the Falls of Rough. He served as member of the Kentucky House of Representatives in 1836 and 1837.

Green was elected as a Whig to the Twenty-sixth, Twenty-seventh, and Twenty-eighth Congresses (March 4, 1839 – March 3, 1845).

Green died in 1893, in Danville, Kentucky. He was buried at Cave Hill Cemetery in Louisville, Kentucky

U.S. House of Representatives
Preceded by John Calhoon	Member of the U.S. House of Representatives from Kentucky's 6th congressional district March 4, 1839 – March 3, 1843	Succeeded by John White
Preceded by Philip Triplett	Member of the U.S. House of Representatives from Kentucky's 2nd congressional district March 4, 1843 – March 3, 1845	Succeeded by John H. McHenry
