= Burwell C. Ritter =

American politician

Burwell Clark Ritter
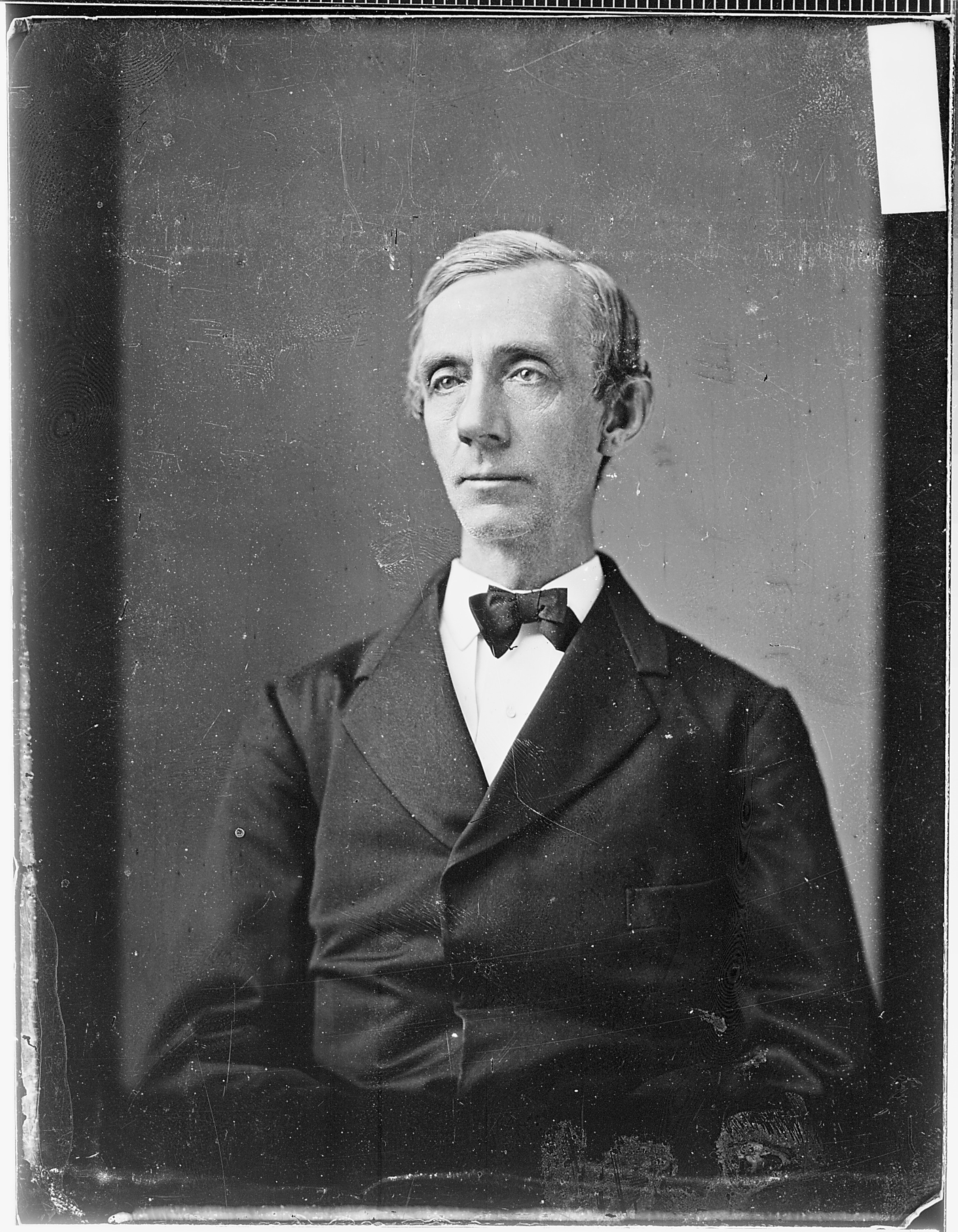

Member of the U.S. House of Representatives from Kentucky's 2nd district
- In office March 4, 1865 – March 3, 1867
- Preceded by: George H. Yeaman
- Succeeded by: William N. Sweeney

Personal details
- Born: January 6, 1810 Russellville, Kentucky, U.S.
- Died: October 1, 1880 (aged 70) Hopkinsville, Kentucky, U.S.
- Relations: Walter Evans (nephew)

Burwell Clark Ritter (January 6, 1810 – October 1, 1880) was a U.S. representative from Kentucky, uncle of Walter Evans.

Born near Russellville, Kentucky, Ritter received a limited schooling. He served as member of the Kentucky House of Representatives in 1842 and 1850.

Ritter was elected as a Democrat to the Thirty-ninth Congress (March 4, 1865 – March 3, 1867). He was not a candidate for renomination in 1866. He engaged in agricultural pursuits. He died in Hopkinsville, Kentucky, October 1, 1880. He was interred in Hopewell (later known as Riverside) Cemetery.

U.S. House of Representatives
Preceded by George H. Yeaman	Member of the U.S. House of Representatives from Kentucky's 2nd congressional district March 4, 1865 – March 3, 1867	Succeeded by William N. Sweeney
