= Samuel Peyton =

American politician

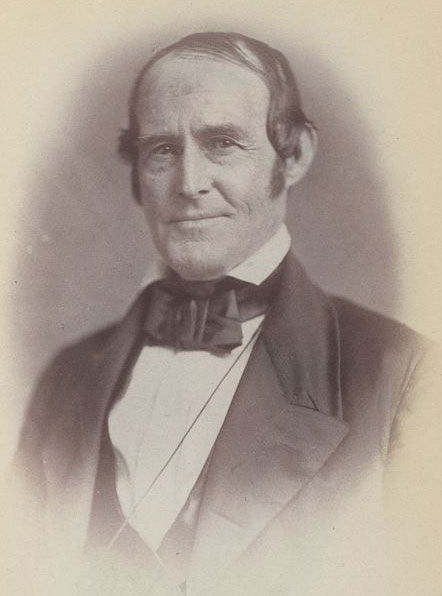

Member of the U.S. House of Representatives from Kentucky's 2nd district
- In office March 4, 1857 – March 3, 1861
- Preceded by: John P. Campbell Jr.
- Succeeded by: James S. Jackson

Member of the U.S. House of Representatives from Kentucky's 3rd district
- In office March 4, 1847 – March 3, 1849
- Preceded by: Henry Grider
- Succeeded by: Finis McLean

Member of the Kentucky House of Representatives
- In office 1835

Personal details
- Born: Samuel Oldham Peyton; January 8, 1804 Bullitt County, Kentucky
- Died: January 4, 1870 (aged 65) Hartford, Kentucky
- Resting place: Oakwood Cemetery
- Party: Democratic
- Education: Transylvania University
- Profession: Physician

Samuel Oldham Peyton (January 8, 1804 – January 4, 1870) was a U.S. representative from Kentucky.

Born in Bullitt County, Kentucky, Peyton completed preparatory studies. He was graduated from the medical department of Transylvania University, Lexington, Kentucky, in 1827 and began practice in Hartford, Kentucky. He served as member of the Kentucky House of Representatives in 1835.

Peyton was elected as a Democrat to the Thirtieth Congress (March 4, 1847 – March 3, 1849). He was an unsuccessful candidate for reelection in 1848 to the Thirty-first Congress.

Peyton was elected to the Thirty-fifth and Thirty-sixth Congresses (March 4, 1857 – March 3, 1861). He was an unsuccessful candidate for renomination in 1860. He resumed the practice of medicine. He died in Hartford, Kentucky on January 4, 1870. He was interred in Oakwood Cemetery.

U.S. House of Representatives
Preceded by Henry Grider	Member of the U.S. House of Representatives from Kentucky's 3rd congressional district March 4, 1847 – March 3, 1849	Succeeded by Finis McLean
Preceded by John P. Campbell Jr.	Member of the U.S. House of Representatives from Kentucky's 2nd congressional district March 4, 1857 – March 3, 1861	Succeeded by James S. Jackson
