= Henry Grider =

American politician (1796–1866)

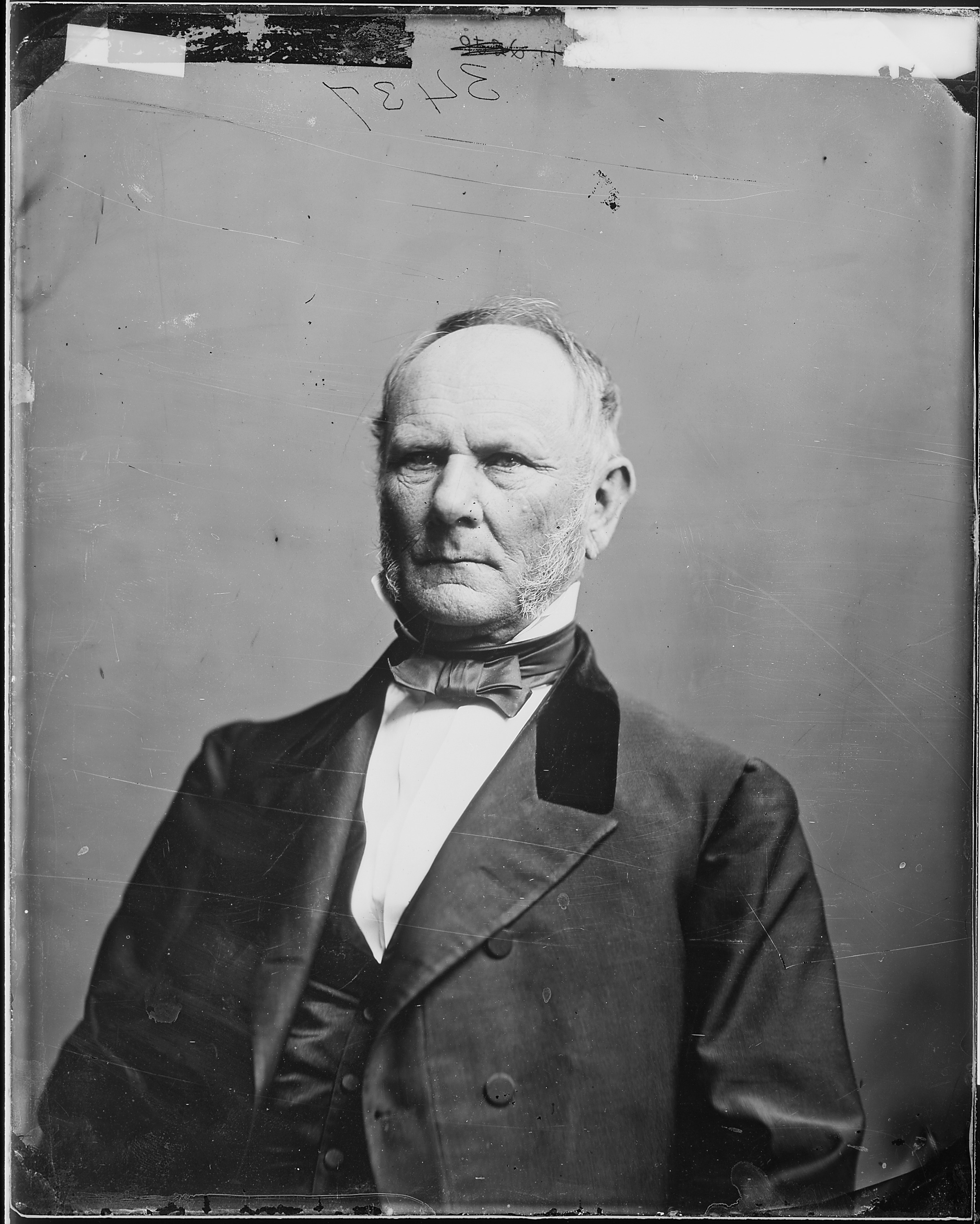
Henry Grider

Henry Grider (July 16, 1796 – September 7, 1866) was a United States representative from Kentucky. He was born in Garrard County, Kentucky. He pursued an academic course, studied law, and was admitted to the bar and commenced practice in Bowling Green, Kentucky.

Grider served in the War of 1812. After the war, he was a member of the Kentucky House of Representatives in 1827 and 1831. He also served in the Kentucky Senate 1833–1837. He was elected as a Whig to the Twenty-eighth and Twenty-ninth Congresses (March 4, 1843 – March 3, 1847) and elected as a Unionist to the Thirty-seventh and Thirty-eighth Congresses and as a Democrat to the Thirty-ninth Congress and served from March 4, 1861, until his death in Bowling Green, Kentucky in 1866. As a congressman, he served on the Joint Committee on Reconstruction which drafted the Fourteenth Amendment to the United States Constitution. His vote on the Thirteenth Amendment is recorded as nay. He was buried in Old College Street Cemetery.

== See also ==
- List of members of the United States Congress who died in office (1790–1899)

U.S. House of Representatives
Preceded by Joseph R. Underwood	Member of the U.S. House of Representatives from Kentucky's 3rd congressional district 1843–1847	Succeeded by Samuel Peyton
Preceded by Francis Bristow	Member of the U.S. House of Representatives from Kentucky's 3rd congressional district 1861–1866	Succeeded by Elijah Hise
