= John H. McHenry =

American politician (1797–1871)

Member of the U.S. House of Representatives from Kentucky's 2nd district
- In office March 4, 1845 – March 3, 1847
- Preceded by: Willis Green
- Succeeded by: Beverly L. Clarke

Personal details
- Born: John Hardin McHenry; October 13, 1797 near Springfield, Kentucky, US
- Died: November 1, 1871 (aged 74) Owensboro, Kentucky
- Relations: Henry D. McHenry (son)

John Hardin McHenry (October 13, 1797 – November 1, 1871) was a U.S. representative from Kentucky, father of Henry Davis McHenry.

== Biography ==
Born near Ballymena County, Ireland, McHenry was tutored privately. He studied law.

He was admitted to the bar in 1818 and commenced practice in Leitchfield, Kentucky. He was appointed postmaster of Leitchfield October 8, 1819. In 1821, he served as a major of the Eighty-seventh Regiment of Kentucky Militia, in 1821. He was appointed Commonwealth attorney by Governor John Adair in 1822. He moved to Hartford, Kentucky in 1823. He was appointed Commonwealth attorney by Governor Thomas Metcalfe in 1831 and again by Governor James Turner Morehead in 1837. He was commissioned a colonel in the State militia in 1837. He served as member of the Kentucky House of Representatives from Ohio County, Kentucky in 1840. He was an unsuccessful Whig candidate for election in 1840 to the Twenty-seventh Congress. He was appointed on the board of the Transylvania University in 1843.

Mchenry was elected as a Whig to the Twenty-ninth Congress (March 4, 1845 – March 3, 1847). He was nominated for reelection in 1846, but withdrew his name on the eve of election. He resumed the practice of law.

He served as member of the State constitutional convention in 1849 and served as chairman. He moved to Owensboro, Kentucky in 1854, and served as judge of the circuit court of several counties in 1854. He died in Owensboro, Kentucky, on November 1, 1871. He was interred in Rosehill Elmwood Cemetery.

U.S. House of Representatives
Preceded by Willis Green	Member of the U.S. House of Representatives from Kentucky's 2nd congressional district March 4, 1845 – March 3, 1847	Succeeded by Beverly L. Clarke
