= Unionist politician (American Civil War) =

Political movement in the American Civil War

Union Party
- Other name: Emancipation Party (Missouri); Union Democratic Party (Kentucky)
- Leaders: Francis Preston Blair Jr. Montgomery Blair; Thomas E. Bramlette; Hamilton Rowan Gamble
- Founded: 1861; 165 years ago
- Dissolved: 1867; 159 years ago
- Merger of: Constitutional Union Party; Know Nothings; Republican Party; War Democrats
- Succeeded by: Unconditional Union Party; Conservative Party
- Ideology: Unionism; Gradual emancipation

Southern Unionists in the border states organized political parties to oppose secession from the United States during the American Civil War. They extended critical support to the wartime presidency of Abraham Lincoln while remaining outside Lincoln's Republican Party. While some harbored antislavery sympathies, most Unionists viewed the abolitionist movement with hostility and initially resisted Lincoln's efforts on behalf of emancipation. Unionist governments were opposed by Copperheads who opposed Lincoln's wartime policies and in some cases the war itself, as well as Confederate regular and irregular military forces.

Abraham Lincoln won the 1860 United States presidential election on a platform that called for the exclusion of slavery from the U.S. territories; his election and subsequent efforts to suppress rebellion precipitated the secession of eleven slave states that formed the Confederate States of America. Unionist opposition to secession in the slave states included conditional unionists who preferred a compromise consistent with southern interests but held out the possibility of secession as a last resort, as well as others whose commitment to Union was unequivocal. These latter unconditional unionists remained loyal to the national government following the commencement of hostilities in April 1861, while many conditional unionists went over to the Confederacy.

Unionists won critical elections in Kentucky and Maryland preceding the July 4, 1861 emergency session of Congress, sending more than a dozen members to the House of Representatives. They established provisional governments in Missouri and the western counties of Virginia that constituted the loyal civilian authority in those states throughout the war; a similar strategy was attempted unsuccessfully in East Tennessee. By 1862, issues related to slavery and emancipation increasingly divided Unionists between opposing factions, culminating in a formal split between Conservative and Unconditional (or Radical) Unionists. Unwilling to sanction proposals for immediate emancipation and Black enlistment, some Conservatives supported the Democratic Party in the 1864 United States presidential election; the remainder followed the Radicals into the National Union Party coalition. Lincoln's reelection on the National Union ticket demonstrated the Radicals' superior strength and established a beachhead for the Republican Party in the Upper South.

Unionists came from diverse backgrounds, although certain commonalities were apparent. Most were former Whigs who had declined to join the Republican Party prior to the war; a minority were Unionist Democrats whose Jacksonian nationalism inspired a fierce opposition to disunion. They drew strength from Appalachia as well as merchants and businessmen in commercial centers like Baltimore. Montgomery Blair was the highest-ranking Unionist in the national government for most of the war as postmaster general in Lincoln's cabinet; other prominent Unionists included Francis Preston Blair Jr., John J. Crittenden, Henry Winter Davis, and Andrew Johnson.

== Name ==
In its broadest application, "unionist" referred to active opponents of secession in the slave states who remained loyal to the national government following the commencement of hostilities in April 1861. Some historians and contemporary sources use the term "unconditional unionist" to distinguish between this former group and "conditional unionists" who ultimately supported the Confederacy. Elected politicians who pledged unconditional loyalty to the United States during the war were called "Unionists" or "Unconditional Unionists." These terms were sometimes used interchangeably; in other cases, they referred to distinct party organizations, as in Maryland, where the Unconditional Union Party defeated the Conservative Unionists in the 1863 elections.

Unionist political parties in the border states and areas of the Confederacy occupied by the Union Army had a variety of names, including the Union Party, the Union Democratic Party, the Unconditional Union Party, and the Emancipation Party. As the war progressed, rival Radical and Conservative organizations divided Unionists in several states. In Missouri, the Conservative state organization called itself the Unconditional Union Party in 1864; its opposition formed the Radical Union Party. Dissimilarly, in Kentucky, Maryland, Tennessee, and West Virginia, the "Unconditional Union Party" was the name used by the Radical faction. Many of these state Union parties sent delegates to the 1864 National Union Convention, including both Missouri Unionist factions.
