= Carl Perkins (disambiguation) =

Carl Perkins (1932–1998) was an American pioneer of rockabilly music.

Carl Perkins may also refer to:

- Carl D. Perkins (1912–1984), U.S. Representative from Kentucky
- Carl C. Perkins (born 1954), U.S. Representative from Kentucky; son of Carl D. Perkins
- Carl Perkins (pianist) (1928–1958), jazz pianist in the Curtis Counce Group
- Carl Perkins (New Zealand musician) (died 2018), roots reggae musician
