= Big Sandy Heritage Center =

Big Sandy Heritage Center Museum
- Location in Kentucky Big Sandy Heritage Center (the United States)
- Location: 172 Division St, Pikeville, Kentucky
- Coordinates: 37.47915°N 82.51976°W
- Type: history museum
- Visitors: 1450
- Executive director: Brandon R. Kirk
- Website: bigsandyheritage.com

The Big Sandy Heritage Center Museum is a regional heritage center located in Pikeville, Kentucky. The museum displays exhibits about regional history and offers an archive consisting of books, old papers, photographs, and related items. The museum is the largest repository of historical artifacts in the Upper Big Sandy Valley of Eastern Kentucky, southwestern West Virginia, and southwestern Virginia. It boasts the largest fossil collection in Eastern Kentucky.

== History ==
The Big Sandy Heritage Center Museum was established in 2003 in Pikeville's historic Chesapeake and Ohio Depot. In 2015, the museum relocated to the 4th floor of the old Hall of Justice Building in downtown Pikeville's historic courthouse square. The new space was noteworthy in that it had hosted the 1990 trial of Mark Putnam, the first FBI agent to be charged with manslaughter. Many museum artifacts are also displayed in Heritage Hall at the historic Pike County Courthouse. A lesser amount can be viewed in the city tourism office.

== Mission and vision ==
The Big Sandy Heritage Center Museum operates under the auspices of city and county government, with additional oversight provided by city and county tourism and the University of Pikeville.

The mission of the museum is to collect, preserve, and promote the history of the Big Sandy region. Through engaging exhibits, educational programs, and community outreach, it strives to inspire a deeper appreciation and understanding of the people, places, and events that define the region's heritage.

The museum's stated vision is to serve as a cultural hub that promotes engagement with the history of the Big Sandy region. Through programs, collaborations, and interactive experiences, the museum seeks to encourage public interest in the region's history, strengthen connections within the community, and preserve its historical heritage for future generations.

== Exhibits ==
The Big Sandy Heritage Center Museum offers the largest fossil collection in Eastern Kentucky, as well as a noteworthy display of indigenous artifacts, mostly from Pike County, Kentucky, Mingo County, West Virginia, and Logan County, West Virginia. Another exhibit features Euro-explorers and Euro-settlement of the valley, highlighted by such topics as Dr. Thomas Walker, Christopher Gist, Mary Draper Ingles, the Sandy Creek Expedition, Jonathan Swift, Daniel Boone, Harmon's Station, Jenny Wiley, and the creation of Pike County, Kentucky. The Antebellum display highlights key personalities and events of the 1840s and 1850s. The museum devotes an entire section to the American Civil War, focusing on the Big Sandy Expedition, James Garfield, the Battle of Middle Creek, Col. John Dils, the 39th Kentucky Infantry Regiment, and events in Pikeville and the Tug Fork region. The Hatfield-McCoy feud exhibit represents the museum's most popular attraction. Many feudists and notable feud events occurred in Pikeville. A significant number of feud-related artifacts are located in the museum, which also contains what is likely the largest collection of feud-related documents. A valued exhibit of the museum features valued furnishings from the Creekmore, a Dils-York mansion once located in Pikeville.

== Directors ==
The following persons have served as curator or director of the museum: Everett Johnson (2003–2014, 2017–2020), Polly Hopkins (2015–2016), Paul Hopkins (2016–2017), Angela Donner (2020–2022), Jason Belcher (2023–2025), and Brandon Kirk (2025–present). Noted Civil War authority Randall Osborne has served on the museum board since 2003.

== Partnerships ==
Primary partners of the Big Sandy Heritage Center Museum include the Pike County Fiscal Court, the City of Pikeville, Pike County Public Library District, Pikeville Tourism, the University of Pikeville, and the Pikeville Community Foundation.
