= Ezekiel F. Clay =

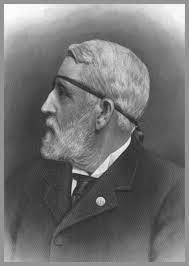
- Born: December 1, 1840; Bourbon County, Kentucky, United States
- Died: July 26, 1920 (aged 79); Bourbon County, Kentucky, United States
- Burial place: Paris Cemetery, Paris, Kentucky, United States
- Military career
- Allegiance: Confederate States of America
- Branch: Confederate States Army
- Service years: 1861 – 1865
- Rank: Colonel
- Conflicts: American Civil War: Skirmishes on Kentucky; Battle of Ivy Mountain; Battle of Salyersville; Chickamauga Campaign; Battle of Chickamauga; Knoxville campaign

Ezekiel Field Clay (December 1, 1840 – July 26, 1920) was a Confederate colonel during the American Civil War that served in several battles that took place in his home state of Kentucky.

== Biography ==
Zeke was born on December 1, 1840, as the son of Brutus J. Clay who was a stock-breeder and would become president of the Kentucky Agricultural Association as well as member of the United States House of Representatives serving the 7th Kentucky District.

When the American Civil War broke out, Clay organized a company of mounted men from Bourbon County to head out for Prestonsburg where they enlisted in the 1st Kentucky Mounted Rifles and would go on to participate in the Battle of Ivy Mountain as his service during the battle would receive praise by John S. Williams.

In the years 1862 and 1863, Clay would go on to serve in the Army of Southwestern Virginia and attempted to capture Louisa in the Spring of 1863 but failed. After the failure of the raid, Clay and his men were commanded by Nathan Bedford Forrest at the Battle of Chickamauga. In Shelbyville however, Clay was wounded but was able to participate in the Knoxville campaign. He would later return to Kentucky to conduct the Battle of Salyersville but was wounded in the eye and captured by the Union forces and arrested in Johnson's Island where he remained until Robert E. Lee surrendered.

After the war, Clay returned to Bourbon County and became a horsebreeder where his farm became famous for being one of the most renowned thoroughbreds in Kentucky. He died on July 26, 1920, after declining health. He was buried in Paris Cemetery.
