= Brutus J. Clay =

American politician

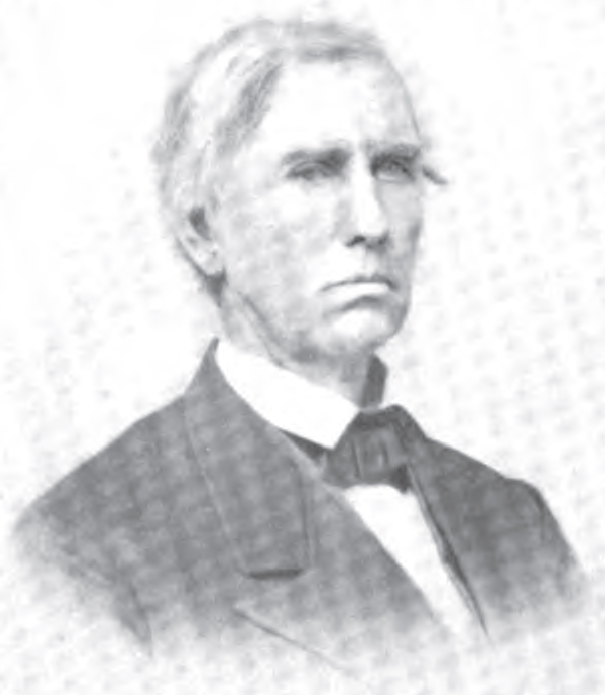

Member of the U.S. House of Representatives from Kentucky's 7th district
- In office March 4, 1863 – March 3, 1865
- Preceded by: Robert Mallory
- Succeeded by: George S. Shanklin

Member of the Kentucky House of Representatives
- In office 1840

Personal details
- Born: July 1, 1808 Richmond, Kentucky, U.S.
- Died: October 11, 1878 (aged 70) Bourbon County, Kentucky, U.S.
- Party: Whig (1844–1850); Union Democratic (1861–1865)
- Spouses: Amelia Field (m. 1831–1843) Ann Field (m. 1844)
- Relations: Cassius Marcellus Clay (brother); Green Clay Smith (nephew)
- Children: 5, including Ezekiel Field Clay
- Parent: Green Clay (father)
- Education: Centre College
- Profession: Farmer

Brutus Junius Clay (July 1, 1808 – October 11, 1878) was a U.S. representative from Kentucky, and a son of Green Clay. His brother Cassius Marcellus Clay also was a politician in the state, and they both joined the Union Democratic Party at the time of the American Civil War.

== Early life and education ==
Born in Richmond, Kentucky to Green Clay and his wife Sally Lewis (died 1867), Clay attended the common schools. One of six children who survived to adulthood out of seven born, Brutus had sisters Elizabeth Lewis Clay (1798–1887), Pauline, Rodes and Sallie, an older brother Sidney, and younger brother Cassius Marcellus Clay (b.1810).

In 1815 Elizabeth married John Speed Smith, who also became a politician in Kentucky, as did their son Green Clay Smith.

Brutus Clay graduated from Centre College, Danville, Kentucky. He entered into agricultural pursuits and stock raising. His father, who had interests in tens of thousands of acres of land, distilleries and ferries, was considered one of the wealthiest men in Kentucky and had become an influential politician.

In 1827 Brutus Clay settled in Bourbon County, where he became deeply involved in agriculture and breeding livestock. He became recognized in central Kentucky as one of its "most successful stock raisers." It as a key part of the Inner Bluegrass region economy.

== Marriage and family ==
Having gotten established, on February 10, 1831, Clay married Amelia Field (1812–1843) of Madison County, daughter of Ezekiel H. and Patsy (Irvine) Field. They had four children: Martha, Christopher Field, Green, and Ezekiel Field Clay. The latter served as a colonel in the Confederate Army during the Civil War. Afterward he went into stock raising, particularly of Thoroughbreds.

The widower Clay married again on November 8, 1844, to Ann Field (1822–1881), a sister of his first wife Amelia. They had one son, Cassius M. Clay, who lived at the Clay homestead in Bourbon County after his parents' deaths.

== Political career ==
Clay was elected in 1840 as a member of the Kentucky House of Representatives. His younger brother Cassius also became a politician in the state.

That year, Clay was also elected president of Bourbon County Agricultural Association, which he served for thirty years. He served as president of the Kentucky Agricultural Association 1853–1861.

In 1860 Clay was elected again as a member of the Kentucky House of Representatives. During the American Civil War, Clay and his brother were Unionists. He was elected to the Thirty-eighth Congress, serving March 4, 1863 – March 3, 1865. He served as chairman of the Committee on Agriculture (Thirty-eighth Congress).

He was not a candidate for reelection and returned to Kentucky to resume his former pursuits. He died near Paris, Kentucky on October 11, 1878. He was interred in his family burial ground at "Auvergne," near Paris.

U.S. House of Representatives
Preceded by Robert Mallory	Member of the U.S. House of Representatives from Kentucky's 7th congressional district 1863-1865	Succeeded by George S. Shanklin
