= Charles Clay =

Charles Clay may refer to:

- Charles Clay (American football) (born 1989), American football fullback and tight end
- Charles Clay (patriot) (1745–1820), minister, American planter, clergyman and politician in Virginia
- Charles Clay (surgeon) (1801–1893), English surgeon
- Sir Charles Travis Clay (1885–1978), English antiquary and librarian
- Chuck Clay (Charles Commander Clay, born 1950), American politician, state legislator from Georgia
