= Humphrey Marshall (general) =

American politician (1812–1872)

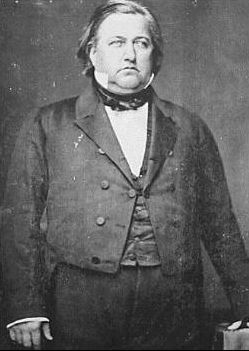

Member of the C.S. House of Representatives from Kentucky's 8th district
- In office 1864–1865
- Preceded by: George B. Hodge
- Succeeded by: Constituency abolished

Member of the U.S. House of Representatives from Kentucky's 7th district
- In office March 4, 1849 – August 4, 1852
- Preceded by: Garnett Duncan
- Succeeded by: William Preston
- In office March 4, 1855 – March 3, 1859
- Preceded by: William Preston
- Succeeded by: Robert Mallory

United States Minister to the Qing Empire
- In office July 4, 1853 – January 27, 1854
- President: Franklin Pierce
- Preceded by: John W. Davis
- Succeeded by: Robert M. McLane

Personal details
- Born: January 13, 1812 Frankfort, Kentucky, U.S.
- Died: March 28, 1872 (aged 60) Louisville, Kentucky, U.S.
- Resting place: Frankfort Cemetery; Frankfort, Kentucky, U.S.
- Party: Whig (until 1854), American (1855–59), Democratic (1860–61)
- Profession: Lawyer

Military service
- Allegiance: United States; Confederate States
- Branch/service: United States Army; Confederate States Army
- Years of service: 1832–1833, 1846–1847 (USA); 1861–1863 (CSA)
- Rank: Second Lieutenant (USA); Lieutenant Colonel (Kentucky Militia); Colonel (USV); Brigadier General (CSA)
- Unit: 1st U.S. Dragoons
- Commands: 1st Kentucky Cavalry (USV)
- Battles/wars: Black Hawk War; Mexican–American War • Battle of Buena Vista; American Civil War • Battle of Middle Creek

Humphrey Marshall (January 13, 1812 – March 28, 1872) was an American lawyer, politician, and military official from Kentucky. During the Antebellum era, he served four terms in the United States House of Representatives, interrupted by a brief stint as ambassador to China. When the American Civil War broke out, he sided with the Confederacy, becoming a brigadier general in the CS Army and then a Confederate Congressman.

== Early life and career ==
Marshall was born in Frankfort, Kentucky, to John Jay (1785–1846) and Anna Birney Marshall. John Jay Marshall was a legislator, law reporter and judge, whose father, also named Humphrey Marshall, was a member of the United States Senate from Kentucky. This elder Humphrey Marshall was a nephew of Chief Justice John Marshall's father, Thomas Marshall. The younger Humphrey Marshall's uncle James G. Birney was a well known abolitionist, and two first cousins, William Birney and David B. Birney, served as major generals in the Union army. Another cousin, James M. Birney, served briefly as Lieutenant Governor of Michigan, and later Minister to the Netherlands.

Marshall graduated from the United States Military Academy at West Point, New York, in 1832, was assigned to the mounted rangers, served in the Black Hawk War, and was breveted as a second lieutenant. However, he resigned from the Army in April 1833 to study law. He was admitted to the bar in 1833 and practiced in Frankfort for two years before moving to Louisville. He became captain in the Kentucky militia in 1836, major in 1838, and lieutenant colonel in 1841. In 1836 he raised a company of volunteers and marched to defend the Texas frontier against the Indians, but his force disbanded on hearing of General Sam Houston's victory at San Jacinto. In 1846 he became Colonel of the 1st Kentucky Cavalry during the Mexican–American War, where he fought at the Battle of Buena Vista as a part of Zachary Taylor's Army of Occupation. Returning from Mexico, Marshall engaged in agricultural pursuits in Henry County, Kentucky.

He was elected from Kentucky's 7th District as a Whig to the Thirty-first and Thirty-second Congresses and served from March 4, 1849, until his resignation on August 4, 1852. During this time, he supported Henry Clay's Compromise of 1850. Marshall was then appointed Minister to China from 1852 to 1854. According to a history of American gambling, "To celebrate the appointment Marshall bucked the tiger at Pendleton's [faro hall in Washington, D.C.], where he lost his savings, the expense money advanced by the government, and six months' pay, for which he gave his note. Pendleton saved his job and reputation, and incidentally made certain of the six months' pay, by lending him sufficient money for the voyage to China."

Returning to Kentucky, he was elected on the American Party ticket to the Thirty-fourth and Thirty-fifth Congresses (1855–59). He was renominated by acclamation, but declined to run for a fifth term. In 1856, he was a member of the national council of the American Party in New York City, where he was instrumental in abolishing all secrecy in the political organization of the party.

== Civil War and later career ==
Marshall's native Kentucky was a border state. Marshall, a moderate in his political views, supported John C. Breckinridge for president in the Election of 1860 and advocated the commonwealth's neutrality. When his efforts failed and Union troops occupied Kentucky, Marshall enlisted in the Confederate army with the rank of brigadier general, and aided the recruitment effort. He was stationed in western Virginia, but saw limited combat. In January 1862, he lost a battle at Middle Creek in eastern Kentucky to future President James A. Garfield. Garfield's Federal cavalry had chased off Marshall's cavalrymen at Jenny's Creek near Paintsville, Kentucky. Marshall withdrew to the forks of Middle Creek, two miles from Prestonsburg, on the road to Virginia. Garfield attacked on January 9, precipitating the Battle of Middle Creek. He eventually forced Marshall to withdraw after a day's fighting.

Frustrated by his inability to secure a good assignment following his victory at Princeton Court House in present-day West Virginia in May, Marshall briefly resigned his commission in June 1862. However, he soon returned to the army and participated in Braxton Bragg's Kentucky operations in the fall of 1862. Resigning again from the army in June 1863, he moved to Richmond, Virginia, and continued the practice of law. In November, he was elected to the Second Confederate Congress as a representative from Kentucky's 8th District. With the collapse of the Confederacy, he briefly fled to Texas.

After the war, Marshall moved to New Orleans. His citizenship was restored by President Andrew Johnson in December 1867. He later returned to Louisville and resumed his law practice. He died in Louisville and was buried in the State Cemetery in his native Frankfort.

== Author daughter ==
Humphrey Marshall's daughter, Nelly Nichol Marshall (born in Louisville, Kentucky, 8 May 1845; died in Washington, D.C., 19 April 1898), was an author. In addition to numerous poems and many magazine articles, she published novels entitled: Eleanor Morton, or Life in Dixie (New York, 1865), Sodom Apples (1866), Fireside Gleanings (Chicago, 1866), As by Fire (New York, 1869), Wearing the Cross (Cincinnati, 1868), Passion, or Bartered and Sold (Louisville, 1876), and A Criminal through Love (1882). She married Col. John J. McAfee, of the Confederate army, in 1871.

== See also ==
- Kentucky in the American Civil War
- List of American Civil War generals (Confederate)

== Notes ==
U.S. House of Representatives
Preceded by Garnett Duncan	Member of the U.S. House of Representatives from Kentucky's 7th congressional district 1849–1852	Succeeded by William Preston
Preceded by William Preston	Member of the U.S. House of Representatives from Kentucky's 7th congressional district 1855–1859	Succeeded by Robert Mallory
