= 1808 Kentucky gubernatorial election =

- August 1, 1808
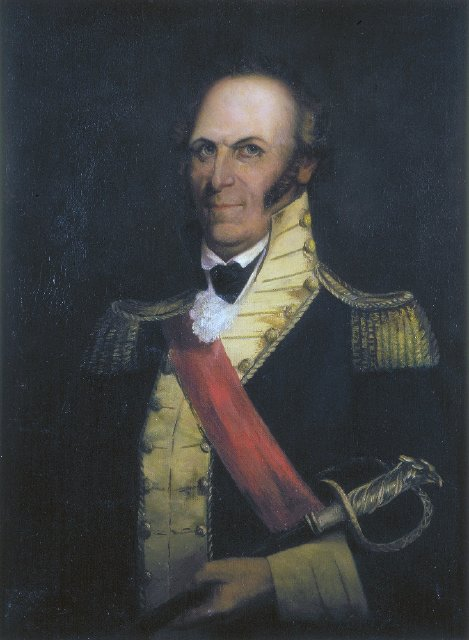

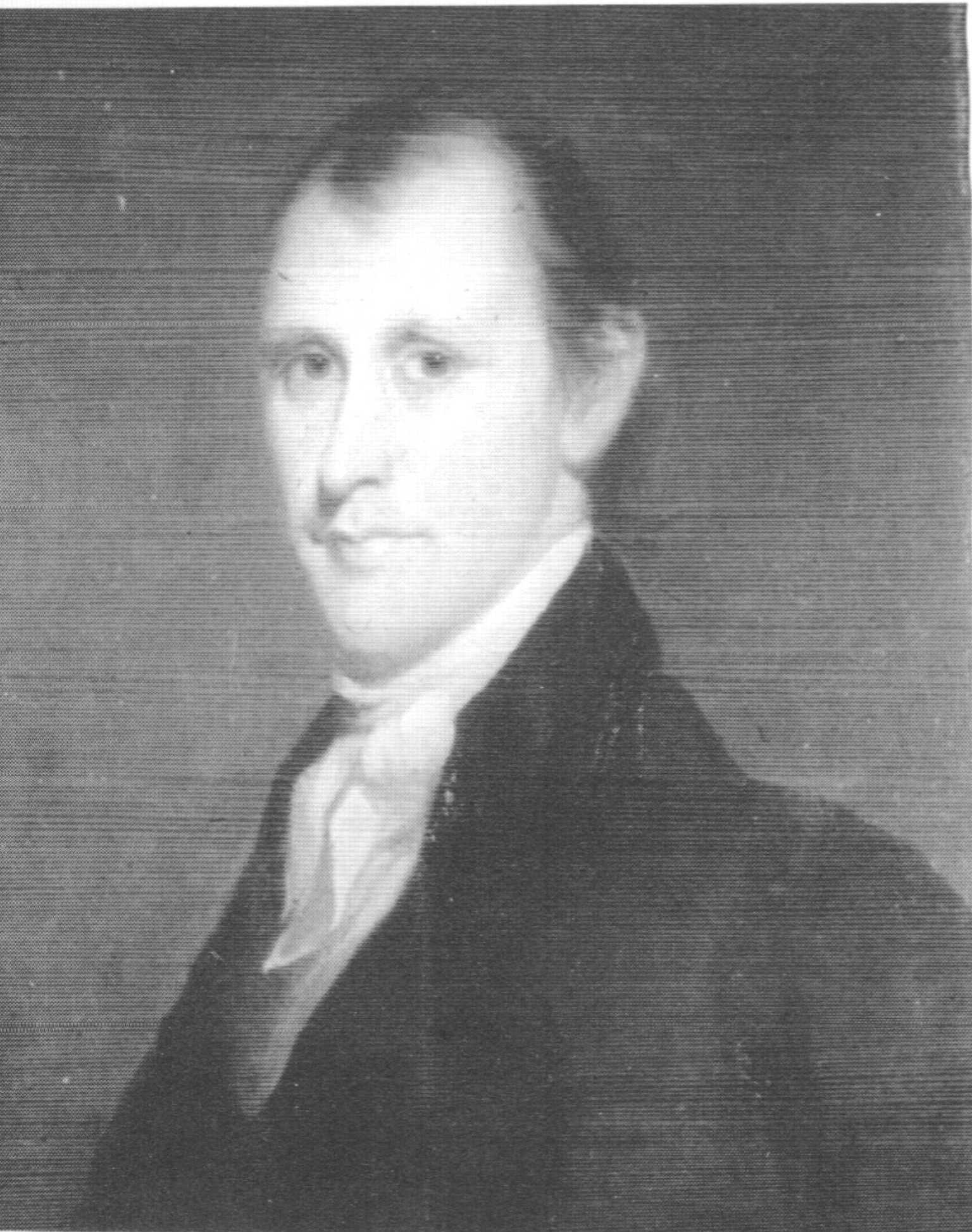

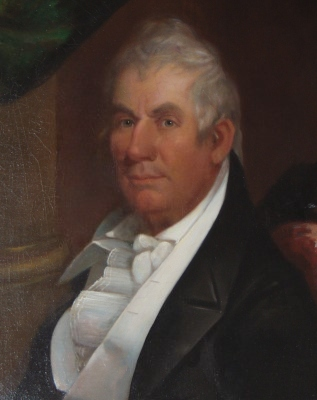
Nominee	Charles Scott	John Allen	Green Clay
Party	Democratic-Republican	Democratic-Republican	Democratic-Republican
Popular vote	22,050	8,430	5,516
Percentage	61.26%	23.42%	15.32%
- Scott: 30–40% 40–50% 50–60% 60–70% 70–80% 80–90% >90% Allen: 30–40% 40–50% 50–60% >90% Clay: 50–60% 70–80% 80–90%
Governor before election
Christopher Greenup
Democratic-Republican
Elected Governor
Charles Scott
Democratic-Republican

The 1808 Kentucky gubernatorial election was held on August 1, 1808, in order to elect the Governor of Kentucky. Democratic-Republican candidate Charles Scott defeated fellow Democratic-Republican candidates John Allen and Green Clay.

== General election ==
On election day, August 1, 1808, Democratic-Republican candidate Charles Scott won the election by a margin of 13,620 votes against his foremost opponent fellow Democratic-Republican candidate John Allen, thereby retaining Democratic-Republican control over the office of governor. Scott was sworn in as the 4th governor of Kentucky on August 23, 1808.

=== Results ===
Kentucky gubernatorial election, 1808
Party	Candidate	Votes	%
Democratic-Republican	Charles Scott	22,050	61.26
Democratic-Republican	John Allen	8,430	23.42
Democratic-Republican	Green Clay	5,516	15.32
Total votes		35,996	100.00
Democratic-Republican hold			
