= Nelly Marshall =

- Born: Nelly Nichol Marshall; May 8, 1845; Louisville, Kentucky, U.S.
- Died: April 19, 1898 (aged 52); Washington, D.C., U.S.
- Occupation: author
- Spouse: John J. McAfee (m. 1871; died 1896)
- Relatives: Humphrey Marshall (father)
- Writing career
- Pen name: Sans Souci
- Language: English
- Genres: novels; poetry; serials; essays; letters; sketches

Nelly Marshall (after marriage, McAfee; pseudonym, Sans Souci; May 8, 1845 – April 19, 1898) was a 19th-century American "southland" author of novels and verse. In her day, Marshall was perhaps one of the most popular writers in the Southern and Western United States. In her first ten years of writing, she may have written more than any woman of her age in the United States. In addition to numerous poems and magazine articles, she published two volumes of verse, entitled A Bunch of Violets, and Leaves From the Book of My Heart. Her novels included Eleanor Morton, or Life in Dixie (1865); Sodom Apples (1866); Fireside Gleamings (1866); Dead Under the Roses (1867); Wearing the Cross (1868); As by Fire (1869); Passion, or Bartered and Sold (1876); and A Criminal Through Love (1882).

== Early life and education ==
Nelly Nichol Marshall was born in Louisville, Kentucky, on May 8, 1845. (Note: According to Johnson & Brown (1904), Marshall was born in the year 1844. According to Raymond (1870), Marshall was born in the year 1847.) She was the daughter of Gen. Humphrey Marshall, who was distinguished as a statesman, diplomat, lawyer, and soldier; and Frances E. (McAllister) Marshall.

Marshall was raised in Henry County, Kentucky, and her education was interrupted by the outbreak of American Civil War. From her earliest childhood, Marshall was reported to have exceptional intellectual ability, and her first compositions are said to foreshadow her future accomplishments.

== Career ==
In 1863, at the age of eighteen, Marshall became a regular contributor to magazines and newspapers, her verse and short-stories bringing her a wide reputation. Her Kentucky home, Beechland, had been destroyed by the American Civil War, compelling her to write for the press, and devoting herself to literary pursuits.

Marshall's first volume was published in 1866, Gleanings from Fireside Fancies, by "Sans Souci". As By Fire, a novel, published in New York in 1869, was successful, giving promise of future success. It was described as a tale "of passion-life, earnest, intense, and full of pathos", and although the critics praised, the also stated it was "slightly overwrought". Other volumes included, A Bunch of Violets; Leaves from the Book of My Heart; Eleanor Morton: or, Life in Dixie (1866); Sodom Apples (1866); Dead under the Roses (1867); Wearing the Cross (1868); Passion: or, Bartered and Sold (1876); and A Criminal through Love (1882). Besides these, she published several volumes on miscellaneous subjects, and contributed to magazines and newspapers many serials, essays, letters, sketches, and poems. Many of her poems are marked by tender touches of pathos and passion.

== Personal life ==
In 1862, during the American Civil War, Marshall made her way through the Southern lines, to nurse a wounded brother, and soon after, met the Confederate officer, Capt. John J. McAfee. For years, her parents opposed a marriage between Marshall and McAfee. In 1869, McAfee began serving his first of two terms as the representative of Mercer County, Kentucky in the Kentucky legislature. By 1870, she was pursuing a literary career in New York City. Her parents eventually consented to the marriage, and her wedding day was scheduled for the spring of 1871. But in January of that year, McAfee was stricken with typhoid pneumonia. Despairing for his fiancé, he sent for her and the wedding ceremony took place at Frankfort on February 13, 1871, in the presence of only five witnesses, the bride being given away by the nearest friend of both parties, Col. James Quilbert Chenoweth, senator from the Mercer district. After the wedding, they lived in Frankfort. On one occasion, Marshall occupied her husband's seat in his absence, when a vote was taken. She voted in his place, and amidst general hilarity, her vote was recorded.

Marshall died in Washington, D.C., on April 19, 1898. (Note: According to Townsend (1913), "Mrs. McAfee died at Washington, D. C., about 1895.")

== Publications ==
- A Bunch of Violets
- Leaves From the Book of My Heart
- Eleanor Morton, or Life in Dixie (New York City, 1865)
- Sodom Apples (1866)
- Fireside Gleamings (Chicago, 1866)
- Dead Under the Roses (1867)
- Wearing the Cross (Cincinnati, 1868)
- As by Fire (New York, 1869)
- Passion, or Bartered and Sold (Louisville, 1876)
- A Criminal Through Love (Louisville, 1882)
