= Garnett Duncan =

American politician (1800–1875)

William Garnett Duncan

Member of the U.S. House of Representatives from Kentucky's 7th district
- In office March 4, 1847 – March 3, 1849
- Preceded by: William Thomasson
- Succeeded by: Humphrey Marshall

Personal details
- Born: March 2, 1800 Louisville, Kentucky, U.S.
- Died: May 25, 1875 (aged 75) Louisville, Kentucky, U.S.
- Resting place: Cave Hill Cemetery; Louisville, Kentucky, U.S.
- Education: Yale College
- Occupation: Lawyer; politician

William Garnett Duncan (March 2, 1800 – May 25, 1875) was a United States representative from Kentucky. He was born in Louisville, Kentucky. He completed preparatory studies and was graduated from Yale College in 1821. He studied law and was admitted to the bar in 1822 and commenced practice in Louisville, Kentucky.

Duncan was elected as a Whig to the Thirtieth Congress (March 4, 1847 – March 3, 1849) but declined to be a candidate for renomination in 1848. After leaving Congress, he moved to Louisiana and settled in New Orleans, Louisiana in 1850, where he continued the practice of law.

Retiring from active law practice in 1860, Duncan traveled in Europe. He resided for a while in Paris, France before returning to the United States in 1875 to Louisville, Kentucky. He died in that city on May 25, 1875, and was buried in Cave Hill Cemetery.

U.S. House of Representatives
Preceded by William Thomasson	Member of the U.S. House of Representatives from Kentucky's 7th congressional district 1847-1849	Succeeded by Humphrey Marshall
