= Carl D. Perkins =

American politician (1912–1984)

Carl Dewey Perkins
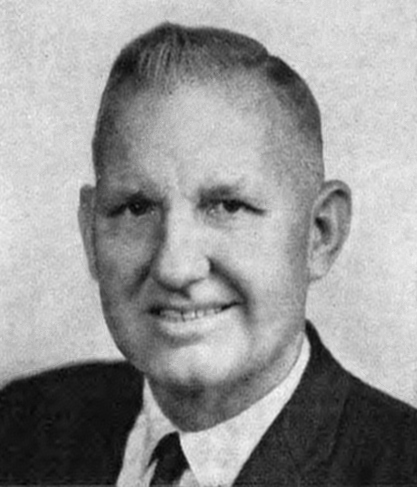
- Official Portrait, 1975

Member of the U.S. House of Representatives from Kentucky's 7th district
- In office January 3, 1949 – August 3, 1984
- Preceded by: Wendell H. Meade
- Succeeded by: Chris Perkins

Member of the Kentucky House of Representatives
- In office 1941

Personal details
- Born: October 15, 1912 Hindman, Kentucky, U.S.
- Died: August 3, 1984 (aged 71) Lexington, Kentucky, U.S.
- Party: Democratic Party
- Spouse: Verna Johnson (m. 1938)
- Children: Chris Perkins
- Education: University of Louisville School of Law
- Occupation: Attorney

Carl Dewey Perkins (October 15, 1912 – August 3, 1984) was an American politician and member of the United States House of Representatives from the Commonwealth of Kentucky serving from 1949 until his death from a heart attack in Lexington, Kentucky in 1984.

== Early years ==
Carl Dewey Perkins was born in Hindman, Kentucky on October 15, 1912, to Dora Calhoun Perkins and James Perkins. Perkins attended high school at Hindman High School and Caney Junior College (now Alice Lloyd College). He worked as a teacher in a Knott County School for 90 students. He then went on to attend the Jefferson School of Law (now known as the University of Louisville School of Law) and graduated in 1935. He passed the bar and served a term as a commonwealth attorney for the thirty-first judicial district of Kentucky.

In 1938 Perkins married Verna Johnson and they had one son, Carl C. Perkins.

During World War II, Perkins enlisted in the United States Army and served a tour in Europe.

In 1940, Perkins was elected as a member of the Kentucky General Assembly was then elected Knott County Attorney in 1941 and reelected in 1945. Perkins resigned January 1, 1948 so that he could counsel the Department of Highways for Frankfort, Kentucky.

He was elected to serve as a Kentucky Representative in 1948 winning against the incumbent Wendell H. Meade.

== Congress ==
With the support of Gov. Earle C. Clements, Perkins won the 1948 Democratic primary election to oppose the one-term congressman from Kentucky's 7th District, Wendell H. Meade, who had been elected mainly due to war-profiteering charged against Democratic incumbent Andrew J. May. Perkins unseated Meade and was elected to the Eighty-first and to the 17 succeeding Congresses and served from January 3, 1949, until his death. From 1967 until his death in 1984,(Ninetieth through Ninety-eighth Congresses) Perkins was the chairman of the Committee on Education and Labor (Ninetieth through Ninety-eighth Congresses) 1967–1984). While a part of the committee, his work helped produce the Economic Opportunity Act of 1964 and Head Start. The local Head Start in his home city of Hindman, Kentucky is named after Congressman Perkins.

Unlike most Southern Democrats, Perkins was a pro-labor New Deal liberal. Perkins did not sign the 1956 Southern Manifesto, and voted in favor of the Civil Rights Acts of 1957, 1960, 1964 (where Perkins was the only yes vote from Kentucky), and 1968, as well as the 24th Amendment to the U.S. Constitution and the Voting Rights Act of 1965. UPI described Perkins as "one of the most effective field generals" in Lyndon Johnson's War on Poverty.

== Death ==
On August 3, 1984, Perkins was on a flight from Washington to Lexington, Kentucky, when he fell ill; when the plane landed, he was taken to a local hospital, where he died at the age of 71.

Kentucky Governor Martha Layne Collins would order flags to fly at half staff at state facilities in honor of Perkins until his funeral.

His funeral was widely attended as he was widely regarded as a popular Kentucky politician over the course of his career. Many of his colleagues flew to Kentucky to pay their respects along with thousands of native Kentucky residents.

The funeral proceedings were hosted in the Knott County High School gymnasium that was filled to capacity by colleagues and constituents of the congressman all of which were there to pay their respects. Notable attendees included Senator Edward Kennedy, House Majority Leader Jim Wright, Congressman William H. Natcher and House Speaker Thomas P. O'Neil who gave the eulogy.

Perkins was succeeded in office by his son, Carl C. Perkins.

== Legacy ==
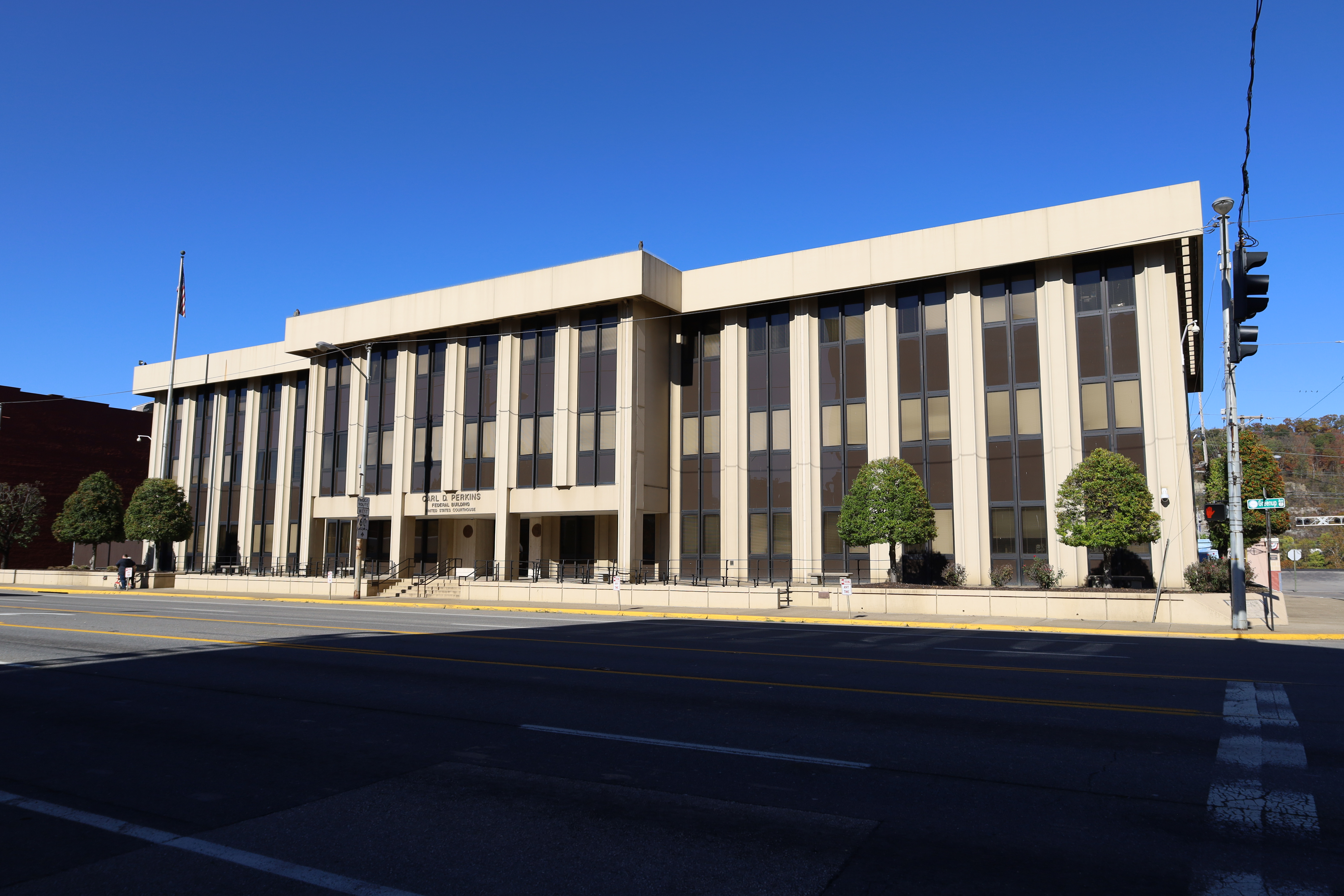
The Carl D. Perkins Federal Building in Ashland, Kentucky in 2023

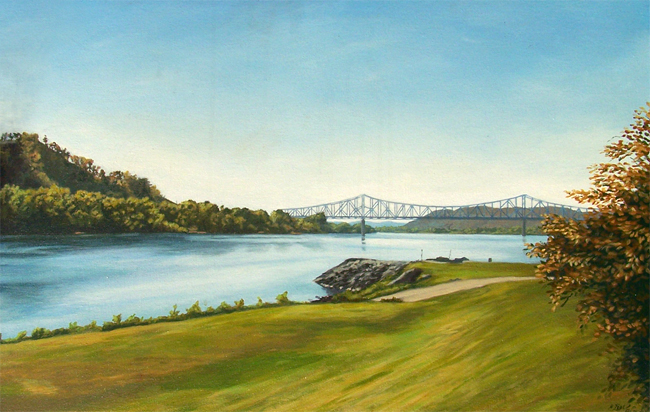
A painting of the confluence of the Ohio and Scioto Rivers, showing the Carl Perkins Bridge. Artist Herb Roe

Perkins's legacy of support to education and the under-privileged is shown by the federal student loan called the Perkins Loan, named for him, as is the Carl D. Perkins Career and Technical Education Improvement Act of 2006, which provides federal money for vocational education. The Carl D. Perkins Bridge crossing the Ohio River, the Carl D. Perkins Building on the campus of Eastern Kentucky University, and the Carl D. Perkins Federal Building and United States Courthouse in Ashland, Kentucky are named after him. The vocational school in Hindman, Kentucky at Knott County Central High School, Carl D. Perkins Job Corps at Prestonsburg and Carl D. Perkins Rehab Center at Thelma are also named in his honor. Kentucky highway 80 in Hazard, Kentucky is named the Carl D. Perkins Parkway. The Carl D. Perkins Parkway stretches from Hazard, Kentucky through Carl D. Perkins home county of Knott county, Kentucky. The Carl D. Perkins Parkway connects to the Hal Rogers Parkway in Hazard, Kentucky. There is also a Carl D Perkins Center, located in Morehead, KY.

Perkins' grave site is in Hindman, Kentucky, in a public cemetery named "Mountain Memory Gardens". However, he was originally buried at a private cemetery near his home in Hindman. In 2007 Perkins's body was moved to where he is presently buried at Mountain Memory Gardens. Verna J. Perkins sold the old house and the land. She had since retired to Lafayette Living Center home for the elderly in Lexington, and died in 2012.

== See also ==
- List of members of the United States Congress who died in office (1950–1999)

U.S. House of Representatives
Preceded by Wendell H. Meade	Member of the U.S. House of Representatives for the 7th District of Kentucky; 1949–1984	Succeeded by Carl C. Perkins
