= John Speed Smith =

American politician (1792–1854)

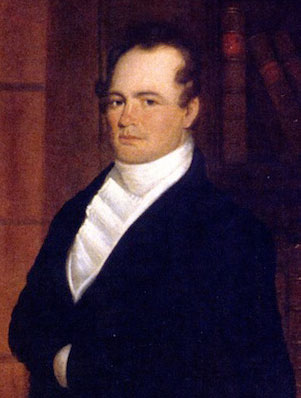

Kentucky State Senator
- In office 1846–1850

Kentucky State Representative
- In office 1845–1846
- In office 1839–1842
- In office 1827–1831
- In office 1819–1820

19th Speaker of the Kentucky House of Representatives
- In office 1827–1828

Member of the U.S. House of Representatives from Kentucky's 7th district
- In office August 6, 1821 – March 3, 1823
- Preceded by: George Robertson
- Succeeded by: Thomas P. Moore

Personal details
- Born: July 1, 1792 Jessamine County, Kentucky, U.S.
- Died: June 6, 1854 (aged 61) Richmond, Kentucky, U.S.
- Resting place: Richmond Cemetery
- Party: Democratic-Republican
- Spouse: Elizabeth Lewis Clay (m. 1815)
- Children: Green Clay Smith
- Profession: Lawyer

Military service
- Allegiance: United States
- Branch/service: United States Army
- Years of service: 1812–1814
- Rank: Colonel
- Battles/wars: War of 1812

John Speed Smith (July 1, 1792 – June 6, 1854) was an attorney and politician, a U.S. Representative from Kentucky, and a state representative for several terms, as well as state senator. He served for four years as a US District Attorney. He was the father of Green Clay Smith, who also served as a state representative and US Congressman.

== Early life, education and military service ==
John Speed Smith was born on July 1, 1792, to Mary (née Speed) and William Smith near Nicholasville, Kentucky in Jessamine County. Smith attended a private school in Mercer County. After that, he "read the law" with an established firm. He was admitted to the bar in 1812 and commenced practice in Richmond, Kentucky.

During the War of 1812, Smith enlisted as a private. He was subsequently promoted and commissioned as a major. He served as aide-de-camp, with the rank of colonel, to General William Henry Harrison, later president of the United States.

== Marriage and family ==
In 1815 at the age of 23, Smith married Elizabeth Lewis Clay (1798–1887), then 17, the daughter of Green Clay, considered one of the wealthiest men in Kentucky, and Sally (Lewis) Clay. Their several children included Sally Ann Lewis Smith (1818–1875), named for her maternal grandmother; Curran Cassius Smith, Green Clay Smith, named for his maternal grandfather; Pauline Green Smith, Junius Brutus Smith (never married), Mary Spencer Smith (never married), and John Speed Smith Jr.

Curran Cassius Smith became a doctor. He also managed his father's estate after his mother was widowed, making his home with her and his family. Green Clay Smith followed his father and maternal uncles into law and politics, serving at both the state and federal levels.

== Political career ==
John Speed Smith was elected to the state house of representatives in 1819, serving one term.

Smith was elected as a Republican to the Seventeenth Congress to fill the vacancy caused by the resignation of George Robertson and served from August 6, 1821, to March 3, 1823. He was not a candidate for renomination in 1822.

He was elected again as a member of the state house of representatives in 1827, when he was also elected as speaker of the Kentucky House.

Smith was appointed by President John Quincy Adams to go on a mission to South America. Adams appointed him as United States district attorney for Kentucky in 1828 and he continued in that office under President Andrew Jackson, serving until 1832.

He was elected again to the state house in 1839, 1841, and 1845. He was elected as a member of the state senate, serving 1846–1850.

Smith died in Richmond, Kentucky, June 6, 1854, and was interred in Richmond Cemetery.

U.S. House of Representatives
Preceded by Samuel McKee	Member of the U.S. House of Representatives from Kentucky's 7th congressional district 1821-1823	Succeeded by Thomas Patrick Moore
