= George Robertson (Kentucky politician) =

American congressman (1790–1874)

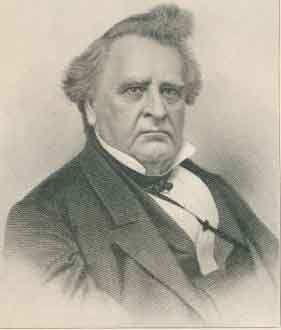

Justice of the Kentucky Court of Appeals
- In office 1829 – 1834; 1864 – 1871
- Nominated by: Thomas Metcalfe; Thomas E. Bramlette

18th Secretary of State of Kentucky
- In office September 6, 1828 – December 1828
- Governor: Thomas Metcalfe
- Preceded by: James Chamberlayne Pickett
- Succeeded by: Thomas T. Crittenden

Member of the U.S. House of Representatives from Kentucky's 7th district
- In office March 4, 1817 – 1821
- Preceded by: Samuel McKee
- Succeeded by: John Speed Smith

Member of the Kentucky House of Representatives
- In office 1822-1827; 1848; 1851-1852

Personal details
- Born: November 18, 1790 Mercer County, Kentucky
- Died: May 16, 1874 (aged 83) Lexington, Kentucky
- Resting place: Lexington Cemetery
- Party: Democratic-Republican; Whig
- Education: Transylvania University
- Profession: Lawyer, Professor

George Robertson (November 18, 1790 – May 16, 1874) was a U.S. representative from Kentucky.

== Early life ==
Born near Harrodsburg, Kentucky, Robertson pursued preparatory studies and attended Transylvania University, Lexington, Kentucky, until 1806. He studied law, was admitted to the bar in 1809, and commenced practice in Lancaster, Kentucky.

== Legal and political career ==
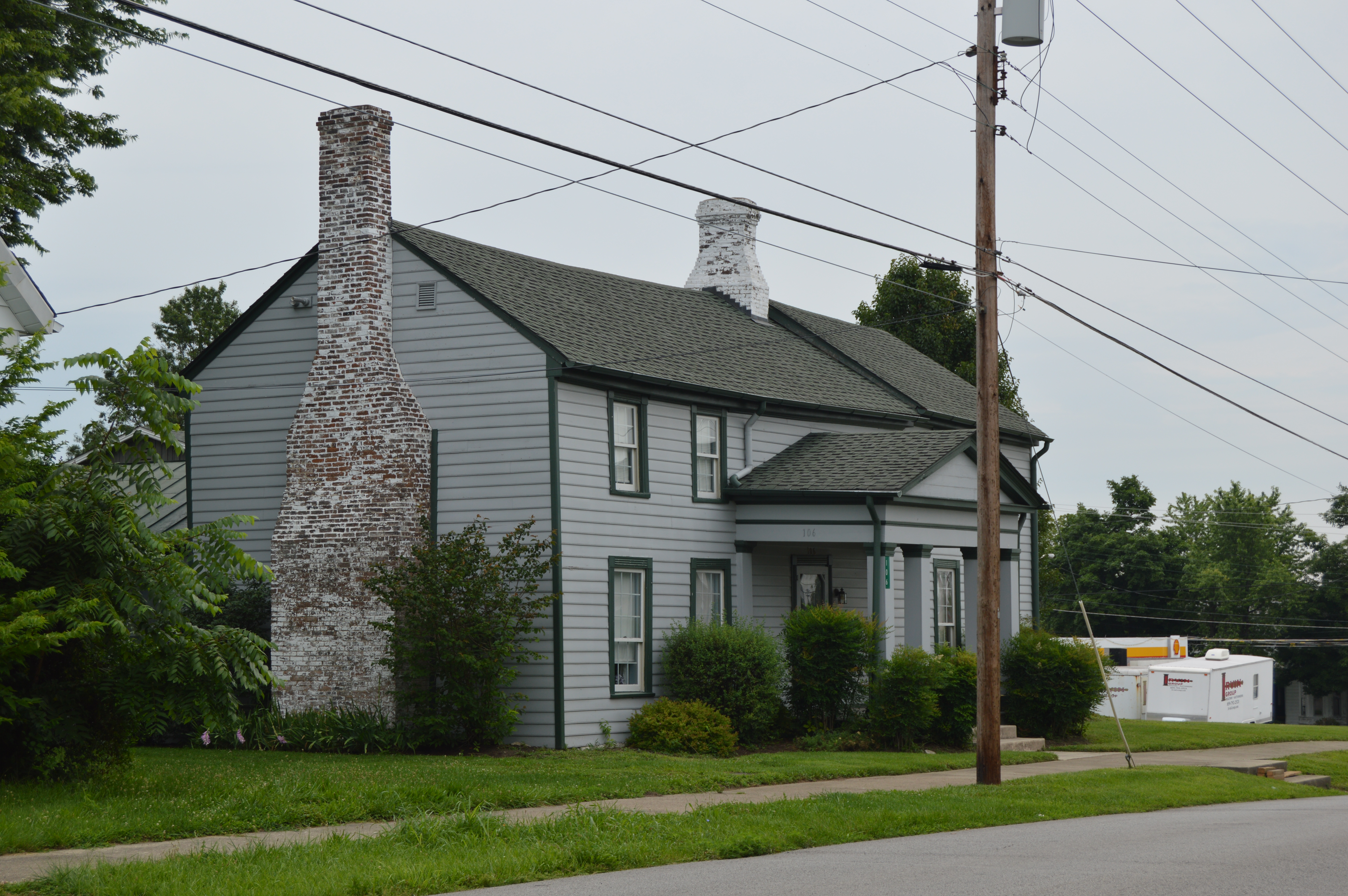
Robertson's house in Lancaster, Kentucky. This home was at different times owned by Robert Letcher, U.S.Congressman and Kentucky Governor, and John Boyle, U.S.Congressman, Judge, Kentucky Court of Appeals, and Judge, U.S. Federal District Court of Kentucky.

Robertson was elected as a Democratic-Republican to the Fifteenth, Sixteenth, and Seventeenth Congresses and served from March 4, 1817, until his resignation in 1821, before the convening of the Seventeenth Congress. He served as chairman of the Committee on Private Land Claims (Fifteenth Congress). He served as member of the Kentucky House of Representatives 1822–1827, serving four years as speaker. He declined the appointment as Governor of Arkansas Territory tendered by President James Monroe and the diplomatic posts of United States Minister to Colombia in 1824 and to Peru in 1828. He served as Secretary of State of Kentucky in 1828. He was appointed associate justice of the Kentucky Court of Appeals in 1829 and served as chief justice from 1829 to 1834, when he resigned. He resumed the practice of law in Lexington, Kentucky, and became professor of law in Transylvania University 1834–1857.

Robertson was elected as a Whig a member of the Kentucky House of Representatives in 1848, 1851, and 1852, and served as speaker in the two last-named years. He served as justice of the Court of Appeals for the Second District of Kentucky 1864–1871 and acting chief justice part of the time. He died in Lexington, Kentucky, May 16, 1874, and was interred at Lexington Cemetery.

Robertson's sister, Charlotte, was the second wife of Kentucky Governor Robert P. Letcher.

George Robertson is the namesake of Robertson County, Kentucky.

Political offices
Preceded by James C. Pickett	Secretary of State of Kentucky; 1828	Succeeded by Thomas T. Crittenden
U.S. House of Representatives
Preceded by Samuel McKee	Member of the U.S. House of Representatives from Kentucky's 7th congressional district 1817 – 1821	Succeeded by John S. Smith
