= George S. Shanklin =

American politician

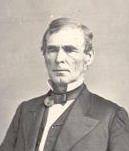

Member of the U.S. House of Representatives from Kentucky's 7th district
- In office March 4, 1865 – March 3, 1867
- Preceded by: Brutus J. Clay
- Succeeded by: James B. Beck

Member of the Kentucky House of Representatives from Jessamine County
- In office August 5, 1861 – August 7, 1865
- Preceded by: William Fisher
- Succeeded by: William Fisher

Personal details
- Born: George Sea Shanklin; December 23, 1807 Jessamine County, Kentucky
- Died: April 1, 1883 (aged 75) Jessamine County, Kentucky
- Resting place: Lexington Cemetery; Lexington, Kentucky
- Party: Democratic

George Sea Shanklin (December 23, 1807 – April 1, 1883) was a U.S. representative from Kentucky.

Born in Jessamine County, Kentucky, Shanklin attended a private school at Nicholasville, Kentucky. He studied law. He was admitted to the bar and commenced practice in Nicholasville. He served as member of the State house of representatives in 1838 and 1844. He was appointed Commonwealth attorney in 1854. He was again a member of the State house of representatives, and served from August 1861 to August 1865.

Shanklin was elected as a Democrat to the Thirty-ninth Congress (March 4, 1865 – March 3, 1867). Although the congressional term began in March, the Congress did not convene until December of that year. During this time, Shanklin participated in the 1865 session of the Kentucky General Assembly.

He retired to his farm in Jessamine County, where he died April 1, 1883. He was interred at Lexington Cemetery.

U.S. House of Representatives
Preceded by Brutus J. Clay	Member of the U.S. House of Representatives from Kentucky's 7th congressional district 1865-1867	Succeeded by James B. Beck
