= Wendell H. Meade =

American politician

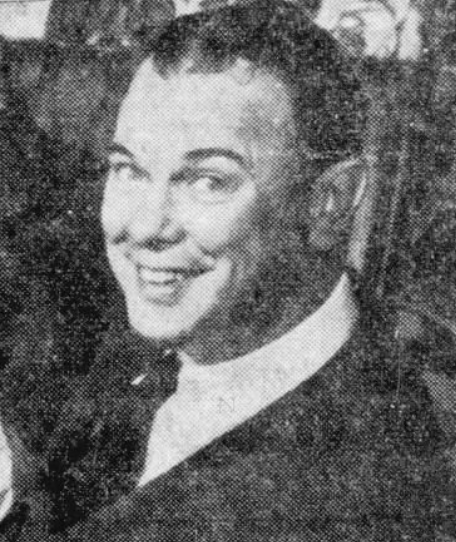
- Meade in 1946

Member of the U.S. House of Representatives from Kentucky's 7th district
- In office January 3, 1947 – January 3, 1949
- Preceded by: Andrew J. May
- Succeeded by: Carl D. Perkins

Personal details
- Born: January 18, 1912 Paintsville, Kentucky, U.S.
- Died: June 2, 1986 (aged 74) Lexington, Kentucky, U.S.
- Party: Republican
- Education: Western State Teachers College; University of Louisville School of Law
- Occupation: Attorney

Military service
- Allegiance: United States
- Branch/service: United States Navy
- Years of service: 1943-1947
- Rank: Lieutenant
- Battles/wars: World War II

Wendell Howes Meade (January 18, 1912 – June 2, 1986) was an American attorney and politician who served as a Republican member of the United States House of Representatives from Kentucky's 7th Congressional District during the Eightieth Congress (January 3, 1947–January 3, 1949).

== Early life and education ==
Meade, born in Paintsville, Kentucky, attended high school at the Kentucky Military Institute in Lyndon before attending Western State Teachers College in Bowling Green from 1930 to 1933. After leaving Western, he engaged in the banking business from 1933 to 1936. Meade graduated from University of Louisville School of Law in 1939 and was admitted to the bar the same year; opening a law practice in Paintsville.

== Career ==
Before his election to congress, Meade was a practicing lawyer in Paintsville, Kentucky, and served as a lieutenant in the United States Navy from November 1943 until January 1946.

Meade, returning from the War, ran for office for the first time. He was elected to the Eightieth Congress in 1946, defeating Jack May, an eight-term incumbent who was under investigation by the House for bribery. Meade served one term before he was unseated in 1948 by Carl D. Perkins, who would hold the seat for 18 terms. He was an unsuccessful candidate for the Republican gubernatorial nomination in 1951. Meade lost a six-candidate race in the August 7, 1954, Republican primary for Kentucky's 8th Congressional District. Meade was zone operations commissioner for the Federal Housing Administration from 1957 to 1961; Kentucky's commissioner of personnel from 1968 to February 1969; and a member of the Kentucky Workman's Compensation Board from 1969 to 1970.

== Personal life ==
During his later years, Meade was a resident of Richmond, Kentucky. Meade died in Lexington on June 2, 1986.

U.S. House of Representatives
Preceded by Andrew J. May	Member of the U.S. House of Representatives for the 7th District of Kentucky; 1947–1949	Succeeded by Carl D. Perkins
