= William Preston (Kentucky soldier) =

Confederate Army general (1816–1887)

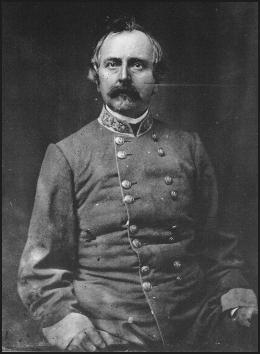
- Born: October 16, 1816; Louisville, Kentucky
- Died: September 21, 1887 (aged 70); Louisville, Kentucky
- Burial place: Cave Hill Cemetery, Louisville
- Relatives: Preston Brown (grandson); Wickliffe Draper (grandson)
- Military career
- Allegiance: United States of America; Confederate States of America
- Branch: Kentucky Militia; United States Army; Confederate States Army
- Service years: 1846–1848; 1861–1865 (CSA)
- Rank: Lieutenant Colonel (USV); Brigadier General (CSA)
- Unit: 4th Regiment Kentucky Volunteers
- Commands: Preston's Brigade; Preston's Division
- Conflicts: Mexican–American War; American Civil War
- Other work: lawyer, politician, diplomat

William Preston

15th United States Minister to Spain
- In office March 12, 1859 – May 24, 1861
- Preceded by: Augustus C. Dodge
- Succeeded by: Carl Schurz

William Preston III (October 16, 1816 – September 21, 1887) was an American lawyer, politician, and ambassador. He also was a brigadier general in the Confederate Army during the American Civil War.

== Biography ==
Preston, the grandson of Col. William Preston—the namesake of Prestonville, Kentucky—was born in Louisville, Kentucky. Francis Preston was his uncle. His sister Henrietta married Albert S. Johnston in 1829. He pursued preparatory studies and graduated from St. Joseph's College in Kentucky. He attended Yale College in 1835 and graduated from the law department of Harvard University in 1838. After graduation from Harvard, Preston was admitted to the bar and commenced practice in Louisville in 1839.

He served as lieutenant colonel of the 4th Kentucky Volunteers in the Mexican–American War from 1847 to 1848. After the war, he was a delegate to the State constitutional convention in 1849 and a member of the Kentucky House of Representatives in 1850. Subsequently, he served in the State senate 1851–1853. He was elected as a Whig to the Thirty-second Congress to fill the vacancy caused by the resignation of Humphrey Marshall and reelected to the Thirty-third Congress and served from December 6, 1852, to March 3, 1855. He stood again for another term in 1854 but was unsuccessful. President James Buchanan appointed Preston as Envoy Extraordinary and Minister Plenipotentiary to Spain in 1858. He resigned as ambassador in 1861 at the outbreak of the Civil War.

Although his home state of Kentucky did not secede from the Union, Preston would serve the South. In November 1861, the provisional government for Kentucky appointed he, Henry C. Burnett and William E. Simms as commissioners to treat with the Confederates States government for the admission of Kentucky into the Confederacy. Shortly thereafter, Preston was made a colonel and became volunteer aide-de-camp to his brother-in-law, Albert Sidney Johnston, who then had his Army of Central Kentucky quartered at Bowling Green.

Preston attained the rank of brigadier general in April 1862. He commanded a brigade in Breckinridge's division of Hardee's Corps at the Battle of Stones River, and during the Army's subsequent retreat to Tullahoma.

On April 28, 1863, Preston was ordered by Secretary of War Seddon to southwest Virginia to relieve Humphrey Marshall and assume command of the District of Abingdon.

That fall, Preston commanded a division at the Battle of Chickamauga.

He was appointed Envoy Extraordinary and Minister Plenipotentiary from the Confederacy to Maximilian, Emperor of Mexico in 1864.

After the war, he again served as a member of the Kentucky State House of Representatives in 1868 and 1869.

William Preston died in Louisville and was interred in Cave Hill Cemetery in Louisville.

== See also ==
- List of American Civil War generals (Confederate)

U.S. House of Representatives
Preceded by Humphrey Marshall	Member of the U.S. House of Representatives from Kentucky's 7th congressional district 1852-1855	Succeeded by Humphrey Marshall
Diplomatic posts
Preceded by Augustus C. Dodge	U.S. Minister to Spain; 1858–1861	Succeeded by Carl Schurz
New creation	C.S. Minister to the Second Mexican Empire; 1864–1865	abolished
