= Robert Mallory =

American politician (1815–1885)

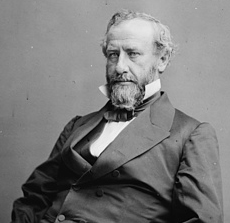

Member of the U.S. House of Representatives from Kentucky
- In office March 4, 1859 – March 3, 1865
- Preceded by: Humphrey Marshall (7th); Charles A. Wickliffe (5th)
- Succeeded by: Brutus J. Clay (7th); Lovell Rousseau (5th)
- Constituency: 7th district (1859-63); 5th district (1863-65)

Personal details
- Born: November 15, 1815 Madison Court House, Virginia, U.S.
- Died: August 11, 1885 (aged 69) La Grange, Kentucky, U.S.
- Party: Opposition; Union Democratic
- Profession: Politician, Lawyer

Robert Mallory (November 15, 1815 – August 11, 1885) was an American politician and lawyer.

== Biography ==
Born on November 15, 1815, in Madison Court House, Virginia, Mallory attended private schools and graduated from the University of Virginia in 1827. He engaged in agricultural pursuits in La Grange, Kentucky, studied law and was admitted to the bar in 1837, commencing practice in New Castle, Kentucky. He was elected an Opposition and later Union Democrat to the United States House of Representatives in 1858, serving from 1859 to 1865, being unsuccessful for reelection in 1864. There, Mallory served as chairman of the Committee on Roads and Canals from 1859 to 1863. He was a delegate to the National Union Convention in 1866 and was one of the vice presidents of the Centennial Exposition in 1876. He resumed agricultural pursuits until his death near La Grange, Kentucky on August 11, 1885. He was interred in Spring Hill Family Cemetery in Ballardsville, Kentucky.

U.S. House of Representatives
Preceded by Humphrey Marshall	Member of the U.S. House of Representatives from Kentucky's 7th congressional district March 4, 1859 – March 3, 1863	Succeeded by Brutus J. Clay
Preceded by Charles A. Wickliffe	Member of the U.S. House of Representatives from Kentucky's 5th congressional district March 4, 1863 – March 3, 1865	Succeeded by Lovell Rousseau
