= Green Clay =

American businessman, planter, and politician (1757–1828)

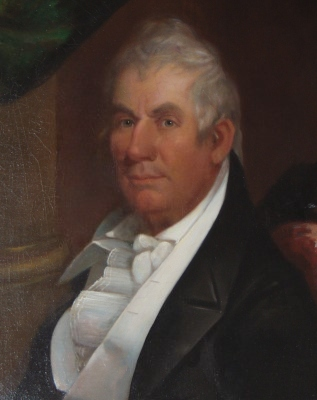

Member of the Virginia House of Delegates from Madison County
- In office October 15, 1787 – October 17, 1790 Serving with Thomas Kennedy, John Miller
- Succeeded by: Hickerson Grubbs Waller

Personal details
- Born: August 14, 1757 Cumberland County, Virginia, Colony of Virginia (now Powhatan County, Virginia)
- Died: October 31, 1828 (aged 71) Madison County, Kentucky, U.S.
- Resting place: White Hall family cemetery, Madison County, Kentucky
- Spouse: Sally Lewis (m. 1795)
- Relations: Henry Clay (cousin); Matthew Clay (brother); Clement Comer Clay (cousin); Green Clay Smith (grandson)
- Children: 7, including Brutus and Cassius
- Military career
- Branch: Clark's Illinois Regiment; Continental Army
- Rank: General
- Commands: Kentucky militia
- Conflicts: American Revolutionary War: Illinois Campaign; War of 1812: Siege of Fort Meigs

Green Clay (August 14, 1757 – October 31, 1828) was an American businessman, planter, military officer and politician in Virginia and Kentucky. Clay served in the American Revolutionary War and helped form the new state of Kentucky after representing its Madison County in the Virginia Ratifying Convention of 1788 and in the Virginia House of Delegates which ultimately authorized creation of the new state of Kentucky. He also served in Kentucky's constitutional convention and in both houses of the Kentucky General Assembly, which would name a county for him in 1807. During the War of 1812 Clay was commissioned as a general and led the Kentucky militia in the relief of Fort Meigs in Ohio. He was believed to be one of the wealthiest men of the state, owning tens of thousands of acres of land, many slaves, several distilleries, a tavern, and ferries, although one of his sons, Cassius Marcellus Clay would become a prominent abolitionist.

== Early life and education ==
Clay was born in 1757 to Charles and Martha Clay, in then-vast Cumberland County in the Colony of Virginia, probably in the eastern part which Virginia's legislature split off from Cumberland in 1777 to become Powhatan County. His elder brothers included Rev. Charles Clay (1745–1820) and Matthew Clay who later became a U.S. Congressman. Green Clay received a private education suitable to his class, and apprenticed to a surveyor. He was a cousin of Virginia politician and Kentucky's famous US Congressman and statesman Henry Clay, as well as an Alabama governor Clement Comer Clay.

== American Revolutionary War ==
During the American Revolution, Clay enlisted as a private in Captain William McCracken's Company, which was part of Clark's Illinois Regiment of Virginia Militia. Thus he served under General George Rogers Clark during the Illinois Campaign. Green Clay also served for a time with the Continental Army.

== Kentucky politician and businessman ==
Perhaps inspired by Daniel Boone, Clay had moved to then-vast Kentucky County by 1777. By 1781 he received an appointment as deputy surveyor of Lincoln County, Virginia which ultimately became part of the new state of Kentucky.

When Virginia's legislature created Madison County. Clay became one of the new county's (part-time) delegates to the Virginia House of Delegates in 1787, and won re-election twice, thus serving twice with Thomas Kennedy, then with John Miller. Meanwhile, Green Clay also won election as one of Madison County's two representatives in the Virginia Ratifying Convention of 1788 (with John Miller; and his elder brother Rev. Charles Clay represented Bedford County, Virginia). Both Clay brothers (and John Miller) voted for adoption of amendments to the proposed federal Constitution, and unsuccessfully voted against ratification without them.

By 1793, Clay had become a justice of the peace in Madison County and by year's end was elected to the lower house of Kentucky's legislature. After two years in that body, he won election in 1795 to the Kentucky Senate (a four-year term). He returned as a Kentucky state senator in 1802 and continued in that role until 1808, when fellow senators elected him their speaker.In 1799 Green Clay was a leader in Kentucky's second constitutional convention. Later he was elected and served at various time in both the house and senate of the Kentucky General Assembly, including a term as speaker of the Senate.

In 1802, Clay had become one of the trustees of Transylvania University, and attempted to lure fellow Virginian James Madison to become that college's president. However, as speaker of the Kentucky senate, he nominated Madison for U.S. president. Although Clay was listed as both non-resident and non-tithable in Madison County during the 1787 Virginia tax census, he owned at least a horse and eleven cattle in the county at the time. Over the next decades, Clay developed and owned several distilleries and a tavern in central Kentucky, where development occurred near Lexington. He also provided ferry service at several stops across the winding Kentucky River.

Clay was an unsuccessful candidate for governor of Kentucky in 1808, finishing third behind Charles Scott and John Allen.

== War of 1812 ==
During the War of 1812, Clay was commissioned as a general in the Kentucky militia. In the spring of 1813, he was ordered to the aid of General William Henry Harrison, who was besieged by British forces led by Gen. Proctor at Fort Meigs, Ohio. Clay and the three thousand men he had brought fought their way into the fort; and the British and native forces ultimately withdrew. However, many of his men were taken prisoner by Tecumseh after they had captured a British artillery battery. Moreover, when the British abandoned the siege, Clay was left in command of the fort. He remained in command when the British returned in July 1813. Though Tecumseh attempted to lure Clay and the garrison out of the fort (by staging a mock battle that appearing to ambush a column of American reinforcements), Clay was not fooled, since he knew no reinforcements were coming. He was able to hold out until the British again retreated, and ultimately Clay and his militiamen returned home.

== Personal life ==
In 1795, Green Clay at 38 married the much younger Sally Lewis (d. 1867) in Kentucky. She was the daughter of Thomas and Elizabeth (Payne) Lewis. They had seven children, of whom six survived to adulthood. Their first child was Elizabeth Lewis Clay (1798–1887) and other daughters were Pauline, Sallie, and Sophia (b. 1813; d. 1814). Their sons were Sidney, Brutus J. Clay (b. 1808), and Cassius Marcellus Clay (b. 1810). At age 17, Elizabeth married John Speed Smith, who became a politician in Kentucky and U.S. Congressman.

== Later years ==
After the war, Clay returned to his plantation. He also published a pamphlet 'To the People of Kentucky and of the United States' (1825) that concerned disputed title in the Tennessee River Valley. He also directed the labor of his many slaves in cultivating commodity crops of tobacco and hemp. He is thought to have been the wealthiest man in Kentucky of his time, as his many slaves were valuable as property.

== Death and legacy ==
Green Clay suffered from face cancer in his final years. He died at his Richmond, Kentucky home in 1828 at the age of 71, and was buried in the nearby family cemetery. His widow Sally Lewis Clay married again, to Jeptha Dudley, a Baptist minister. She moved with him to Frankfort, Kentucky, living there for nearly 40 years before her death in 1867.

His grandson Green Clay Smith was named for his maternal grandfather. Like his father, and maternal uncles Brutus and Cassius, and several cousins, he also became a politician in Kentucky and the U.S. Congress. Clay County, Kentucky, was named in his honor in 1807, during his lifetime.
