= John Allen (soldier) =

American politician and army officer

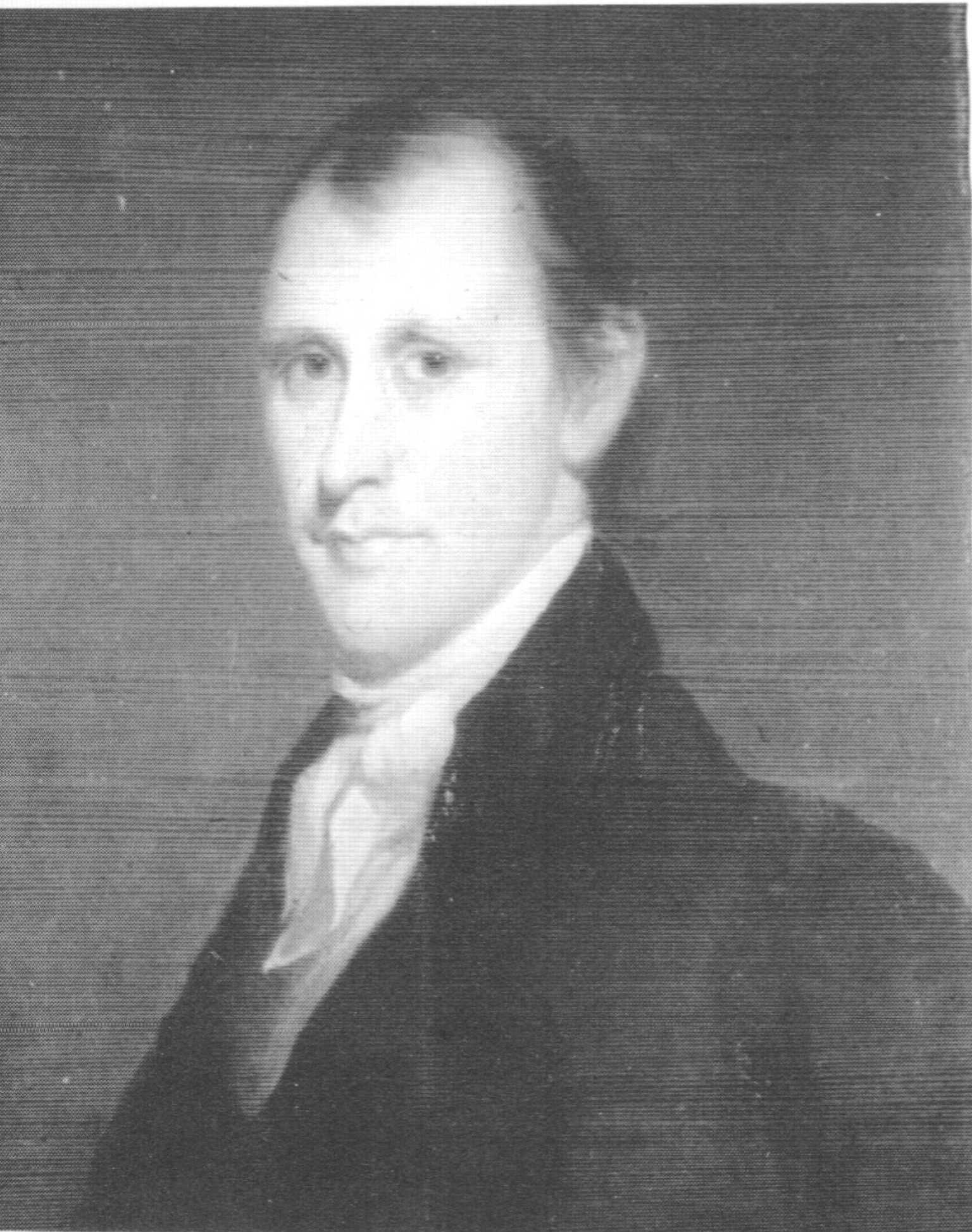

Member of the Kentucky Senate
- In office 1807–1813

Member of the Kentucky House of Representatives
- In office 1800–1807

Personal details
- Born: December 30, 1771 Rockbridge County, Virginia
- Died: January 22, 1813 (aged 41) River Raisin, Michigan Territory

Military service
- Allegiance: United States
- Branch/service: Kentucky militia
- Rank: Colonel
- Commands: 1st Regiment of Riflemen
- Battles/wars: War of 1812; Battle of Frenchtown †

John Allen (December 30, 1771 – January 22, 1813) was an American politician and army officer who was killed in the War of 1812.

== Biography ==
Allen was born in Rockbridge County, Virginia, and moved with his father to Kentucky in 1779. He went to school in Bardstown, Kentucky and studied law in Staunton, Virginia. He then returned to Kentucky to law practice in Shelbyville. He was elected to the Kentucky House of Representatives from Shelby County in 1800, and remained a member of the chamber until his election to the Kentucky Senate in 1807, where he served until his death.

Allen ran for governor in 1808 against Charles Scott and Green Clay, placing second behind Scott with 23.4%.

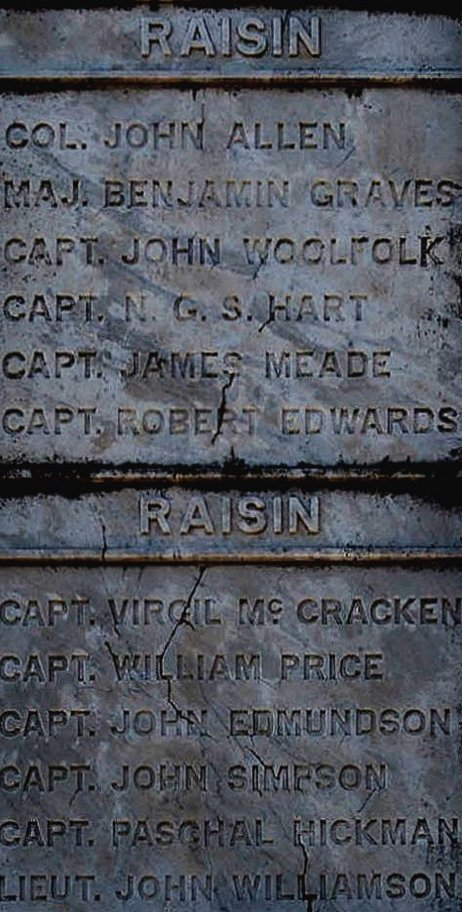
Allen's name on the Kentucky War Memorial in Frankfort, KY along with other officers who died at the Battle of Frenchtown or in the subsequent massacre of wounded prisoners

Early in the War of 1812, Allen raised the 1st Regiment of Riflemen to serve under General William Henry Harrison. Allen was commissioned its colonel. He was killed in action while leading his men at the Battle of Frenchtown on the River Raisin in southeast Michigan.

Allen County, Kentucky was named for him in 1815. He is also honored by Allen County, Ohio, and Allen County, Indiana.
