= Pikeville station =

- Chesapeake and Ohio Passenger Depot
- U.S. National Register of Historic Places
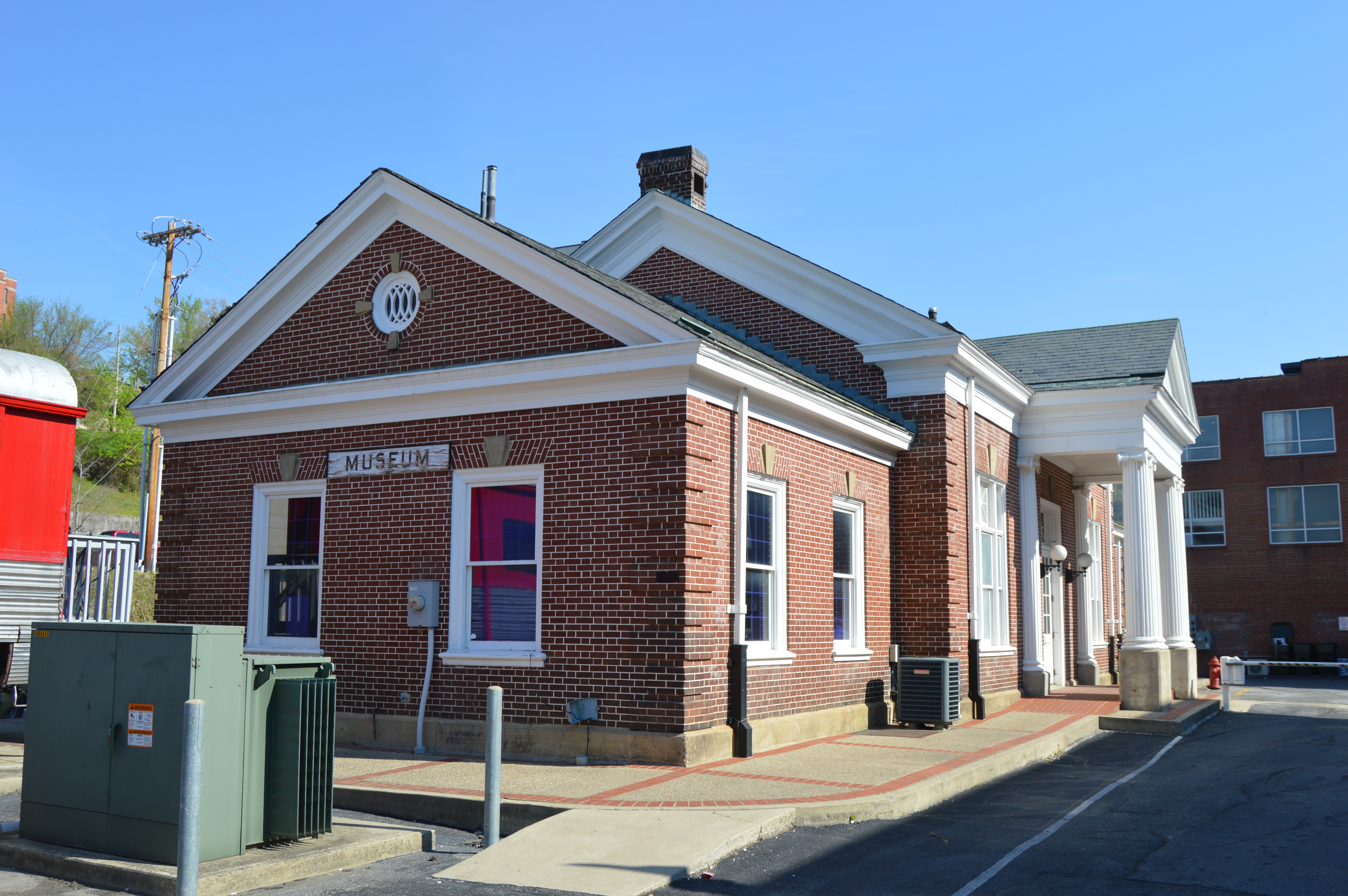

- Location within Kentucky Location within the United States
- Location: Pikeville, Pike County, Kentucky, USA
- Coordinates: 37°28′44″N 82°31′12″W
- Area: .38 acres (0.15 ha)
- Built: 1923
- Architectural style: Classical Revival
- NRHP reference No.: 87000618
- Added to NRHP: April 23, 1987

The Chesapeake and Ohio Passenger Depot in Pikeville, Kentucky was built by the Chesapeake and Ohio Railway in 1923. The station along with a small baggage depot nearby were listed on the National Register of Historic Places on April 23, 1987.

The Chesapeake and Ohio Railway reached Pikeville in 1907. The depot is a one-story brick structure built in the Classical Revival style of architecture. About 150 feet (46 m) from the depot is a small, similarly designed baggage station. At one point, the depot and baggage station were connected by a canopy, which has since been removed.

Until 2015, the building housed the Big Sandy Heritage Center.

The building currently houses Roasted - a locally owned coffee house and cafe.

Preceding station	Chesapeake and Ohio Railway	Following station
Harold toward Ashland	Big Sandy Division	Shelby toward Carver, Hellier or Elkhorn City
