= William Thomasson =

American politician (1797–1882)

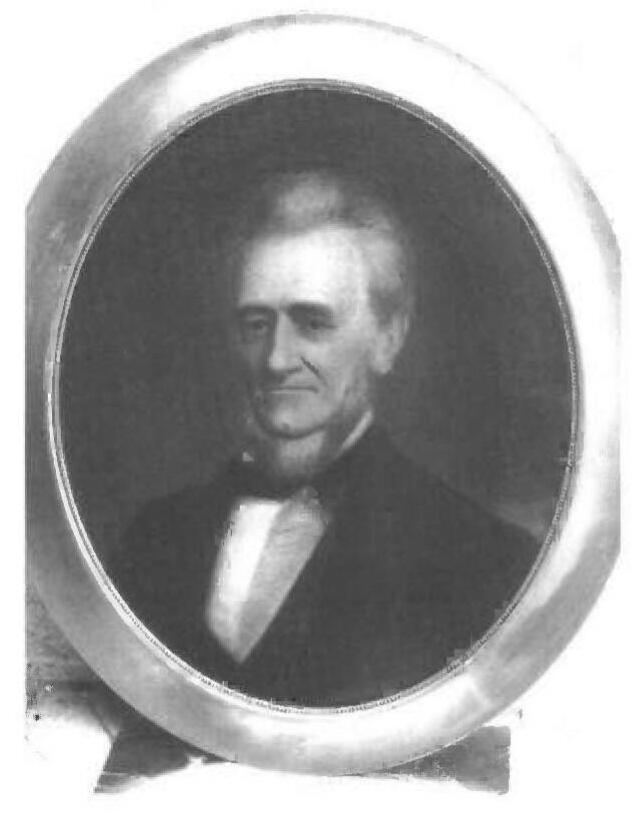

Member of the U.S. House of Representatives
- In office March 4, 1843 – March 3, 1847
- Preceded by: John Pope
- Succeeded by: Garnett Duncan

Personal details
- Born: William Poindexter Thomasson; October 8, 1797 New Castle, Kentucky, U.S.
- Died: December 29, 1882 (aged 85) La Grange, Kentucky, U.S.
- Resting place: Cave Hill Cemetery; Louisville, Kentucky, U.S.
- Spouse: Charlotte Leonard (m. 1825)
- Children: 4
- Occupation: Lawyer; politician
- Military career
- Allegiance: United States
- Branch: United States Army; Union Army
- Units: Seventy-first Regiment, New York Volunteer Infantry
- Conflicts: War of 1812; American Civil War

William Poindexter Thomasson (October 8, 1797 – December 29, 1882) was a U.S. representative from Kentucky.

== Early life ==
William Poindexter Thommasson was born on October 8, 1797, in New Castle, Kentucky. Thomasson completed preparatory studies. He served in Captain Duncan's company in the War of 1812.

Thomasson studied law. He was admitted to the bar and commenced practice in Corydon, Indiana, before he was twenty-one years of age.

== Career ==
Thomasson served as member of the Indiana House of Representatives in 1818–1820. He served as prosecuting attorney of Corydon in 1818. He moved to Louisville, Kentucky, in 1841. After moving to Louisville, he became city attorney and county attorney.

Thomasson was elected as a Whig to the Twenty-eighth and Twenty-ninth Congresses (March 4, 1843 – March 3, 1847). He declined to be a candidate for renomination. He moved to Chicago, Illinois, and resumed the practice of law.

During the Civil War, Thomasson served in the Union Army in the Seventy-first Regiment, New York Volunteer Infantry.

== Personal life ==
Thomasson married Charlotte Leonard of Floyd County, Indiana in 1825. They had four children: Nelson, John J., Saran and Laura.

Thomasson died near La Grange, Kentucky on December 29, 1882. He was interred in Cave Hill Cemetery in Louisville, Kentucky.

U.S. House of Representatives
Preceded by John Pope	Member of the U.S. House of Representatives from Kentucky's 7th congressional district 1843-1847	Succeeded by Garnett Duncan
