= Battle of Salyersville =

Battle of the American Civil War

Coordinates: 37°44′41″N 83°04′51″W

Battle of Salyersville (or Half Mountain)
- Part of the American Civil War
Date	April 13–14, 1864
Location	Salyersville, Magoffin County, Kentucky
Result	Union victory

Belligerents
Confederate States of America	United States of America

Commanders and leaders
Colonel Ezekiel F. Clay	Colonel George W. Gallup, Colonel C. J. True

Strength
3rd Kentucky Mounted Rifles (1000)	Sub-District of Eastern Kentucky, reinforcements (4 regiments total)

Casualties and losses
24 killed and wounded, 50 captured	Unknown

The Battle of Salyersville, also called Battle of Half Mountain (not to be confused with The Battle of Ivy Mountain, which took place in April 1861) was the largest of the many skirmishes in Magoffin County, Kentucky, during the American Civil War.

In April 1864, Confederate Colonel Ezekiel F. Clay led his regiment of mounted infantry on a raid to Kentucky. He was opposed by the forces of the Sub-District of Eastern Kentucky under Union Colonel George W. Gallup, consisting of the 14th Kentucky Infantry and 39th Kentucky Infantry, and reinforcements under Colonel C. J. True consisting of the 40th Kentucky Infantry and the 11th Michigan Cavalry. On April 13, 1864, the Confederates attacked the Union position at Paintsville, but Colonel Gallup's 750 men held their position. On April 14, Clay and his exhausted troops and horses were trying to rest near the mouths of Puncheon and Little Half Mountain Creeks. Col. Clay didn't think Col. Gallup would pursue him, but that turned out to be a costly misjudgment. Some believe that Gallup was led by a young lade from Puncheon named Liza Whitaker through Ivyton and down Gun Creek to Brushy Fork. Col. Gallup split his troops at Brushy Creek, sending 300 with Orlando Brown down the ridge of Little Half Mountain, while leading the rest down the Fred Risner Branch in a move that trapped Col. Clay and his troops. Col. Gallup was assisted by Col. John S. Dils, Col. David A. Mims, Lt. Col. Stephen Meek Ferfuson, Lieut. E. J. Roberts, acting assistant adjutant-general, Col. Orlando Brown, and Capt John C Collins, who claims to have shot Clay. Near the end of the battle, Clay was shot through the eye and had to remove himself from battle. Col. Clay was eventually captured and taken to an Ohio Prison by Elijah Patrick where he was finally pardoned by President Lincoln near the end of the war. Clay refused to accept the pardon and waited for the war to end to gain his freedom. The CSA suffered casualties of 60 men and 200 horses. 400 saddles and 300 small-arms were taken. The USA sustained only slight losses.

== See also ==
- List of battles fought in Kentucky
