= Samuel McKee (politician, born 1774) =

American politician and lawyer (1774–1826)

Member of the U.S. House of Representatives from Kentucky
- In office March 4, 1809 – March 4, 1817
- Preceded by: John Boyle
- Succeeded by: George Robertson
- Constituency: 2nd district (1809–1813); 7th district (1813–1817)

Personal details
- Born: October 13, 1774 near Lexington, Virginia, U.S.
- Died: October 16, 1826 (aged 52)
- Resting place: Frankfort Cemetery
- Party: Democratic-Republican
- Spouse: Martha Robertson (m. 1807)
- Education: Liberty Hall Academy
- Occupation: Attorney

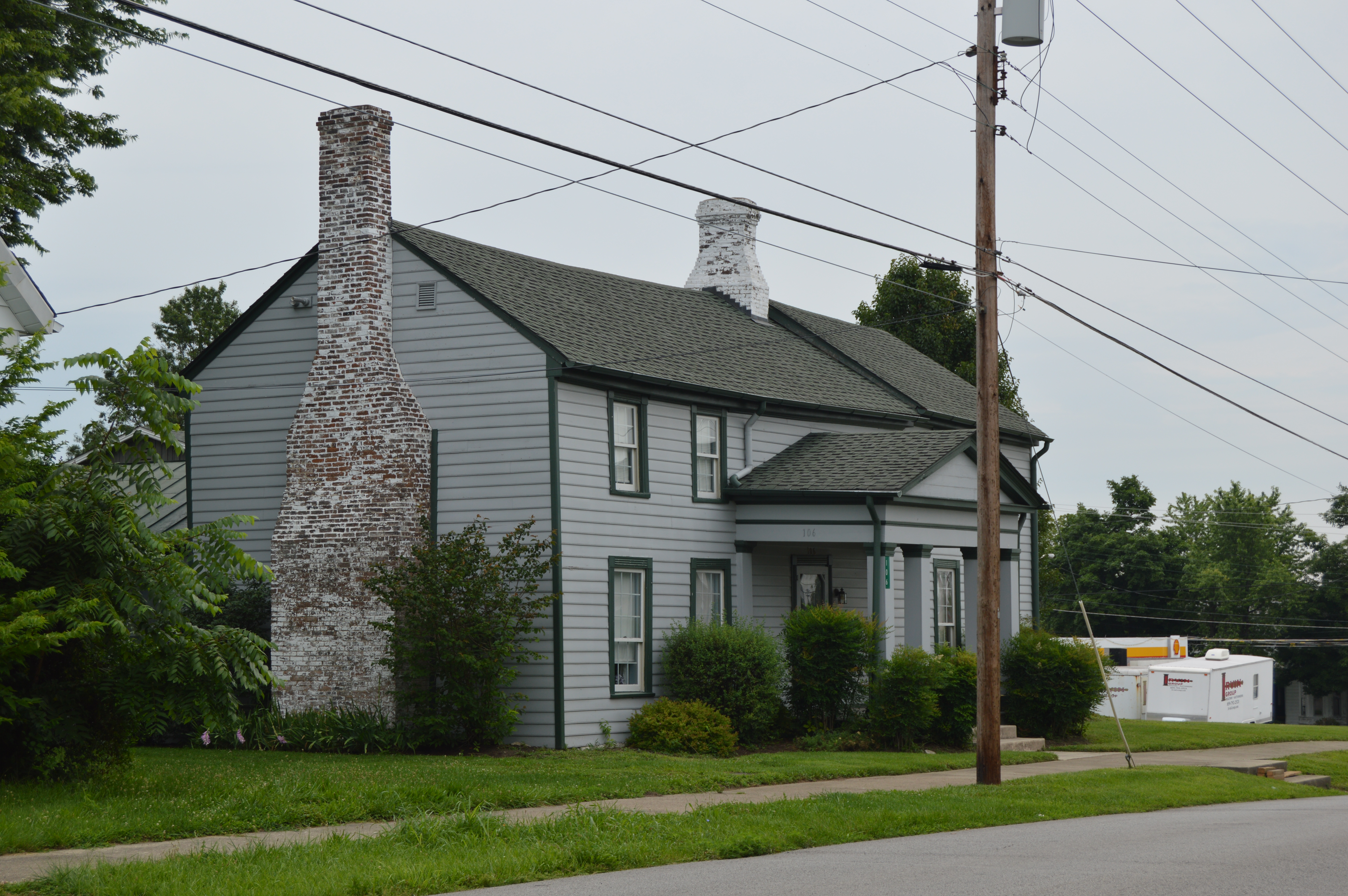
McKee's house in Danville

Samuel McKee (October 13, 1774 – October 16, 1826) was a U.S. Representative from Kentucky.

Born near Lexington, Augusta (now Rockbridge) County, Virginia, McKee was graduated from Liberty Hall Academy (now Washington and Lee University), Lexington, Virginia, in 1794. He studied law. He was admitted to the bar in 1800 and commenced practice in Somerset, Kentucky. He served as surveyor of Pulaski County. He moved to Lancaster, Kentucky, in 1807 and continued the practice of law. He served as member of the State house of representatives 1802–1808.

McKee was elected as a Democratic-Republican to the Eleventh and to the three succeeding Congresses (March 4, 1809 – March 3, 1817). He served as chairman of the Committee on Public Lands (Thirteenth Congress). He served in the War of 1812 on the staff of General (and later President) William Henry Harrison. Samuel McKee was a model of "imbedded oversight" by the Congress of the Executive Branch in the early 19th century. As a Congressman from Kentucky, he participated in formulating, drafting and introducing in the Congress the Articles of War declaring war on Great Britain in 1812. Then, during the summer recess, he enlisted as a private, serving on the staff of General William Henry Harrison at, among other places, the Battle of the Thames. Thus, he was able to provide feedback to his Congressional allies, including Henry Clay and John C. Calhoun. After the war, he resumed the practice of his profession in Lancaster. He was a lifelong political ally and close personal friend of Henry Clay, and of John C. Calhoun. Family records indicate there was a long-running series of letters exchanged between the three on many of the most critical political issues of the day. Although the whereabouts of those to McKee are unknown, those of his to Clay and Calhoun may be archived in their papers. He was a founding trustee of Centre College of Kentucky in Danville. He was appointed by President Monroe as a member of the commission to clear the Ohio and Mississippi Rivers of obstructions and served until his death in Hickman County, Kentucky, on October 16, 1826. He was interred in Frankfort Cemetery, Frankfort, Kentucky.

He was married on June 25, 1807, to Martha "Patsy" Robertson (1788–1848) in Lancaster, Garrard County, Kentucky. Martha was the daughter of Alexander Robertson, an early pioneer in the Harrodsburg, Kentucky area, a delegate to the Virginia House of Delegates to ratify the US Constitution, and a sister and sister-in-law of two other men who would rise to prominence in state and national politics.

Martha's brother, George Robertson (1790–1874), studied law under McKee, succeeded McKee in the Congress (1817–1821), and served as Chief Justice of Kentucky (1829–1843 and 1870–1871). He also declined four cabinet offers and two Supreme Court nominations. McKee's brother-in-law was Robert Perkins Letcher (1788–1861) succeeded Robertson in the US Congress, and later served as the fifteenth Governor of Kentucky (1840–1844) and Ambassador to Mexico (1849–1852). At various times in their lives each of these three lived in the same house in Lancaster, Kentucky, which became known as "The House of the Three Congressmen".

U.S. House of Representatives
Preceded by John Boyle	Member of the U.S. House of Representatives from Kentucky's 2nd congressional district 1809–1813	Succeeded by Henry Clay
Preceded by District created	Member of the U.S. House of Representatives from Kentucky's 7th congressional district 1813–1817	Succeeded by George Robertson
