= Kentucky's 7th congressional district =

Former Kentucky congressional district

Coordinates: 37°50′N 83°00′W

- Obsolete district
- Created: 1810
- Eliminated: 1990
- Years active: 1813–1993

Kentucky's 7th congressional district was a district of the United States House of Representatives in Kentucky.

It was eliminated in 1993 when reapportionment reduced Kentucky's House representation from seven seats to six. The eastern Kentucky region formerly in the 7th district is now largely in the 5th district. The last congressman to represent the 7th district was Chris Perkins, who succeeded his father, Carl D. Perkins.

== List of members representing the district ==
Member	Party	Years	Cong ress	Electoral history	Location
District created March 4, 1813
Samuel McKee (Lancaster)	Democratic-Republican	March 4, 1813 – March 3, 1817	13th 14th	Redistricted from the 2nd district and re-elected in 1812. Re-elected in 1814. Retired.	1813–1823; Clay, Garrard, Madison, and Mercer counties
George Robertson (Lancaster)	Democratic-Republican	March 4, 1817 – 1821	15th 16th	Elected in 1816. Re-elected in 1818. Re-elected in 1820. Resigned before convening of Congress.	1813–1823; Clay, Garrard, Madison, and Mercer counties
Vacant		1821 – August 6, 1821	17th		1813–1823; Clay, Garrard, Madison, and Mercer counties
John S. Smith (Richmond)	Democratic-Republican	August 6, 1821 – March 3, 1823	17th	Elected to finish Robertson's term and seated December 3, 1821. Redistricted to the 4th district and lost re-election.	1813–1823; Clay, Garrard, Madison, and Mercer counties
Thomas P. Moore (Harrodsburg)	Democratic-Republican	March 4, 1823 – March 3, 1825	18th 19th 20th	Elected in 1822. Re-elected in 1824. Re-elected in 1827. Retired.	1823–1833; Jessamine, Lincoln, Mercer, and Washington counties
Thomas P. Moore (Harrodsburg)	Jacksonian	March 4, 1825 – March 3, 1829	18th 19th 20th	Elected in 1822. Re-elected in 1824. Re-elected in 1827. Retired.	1823–1833; Jessamine, Lincoln, Mercer, and Washington counties
John Kincaid (Stanford)	Jacksonian	March 4, 1829 – March 3, 1831	21st	Elected in 1829. Retired.	1823–1833; Jessamine, Lincoln, Mercer, and Washington counties
John Adair (Harrodsburg)	Jacksonian	March 4, 1831 – March 3, 1833	22nd	Elected in 1831. Retired.	1823–1833; Jessamine, Lincoln, Mercer, and Washington counties
Benjamin Hardin (Bardstown)	Anti-Jacksonian	March 4, 1833 – March 3, 1837	23rd 24th	Elected in 1833. Re-elected in 1835. Lost re-election.	1833–1843 [data missing]
John Pope (Springfield)	Whig	March 4, 1837 – March 3, 1843	25th 26th 27th	Elected in 1837. Re-elected in 1839. Re-elected in 1841. Redistricted to the 5th district and lost re-election as an independent.	1833–1843 [data missing]
William Thomasson (Louisville)	Whig	March 4, 1843 – March 3, 1847	28th 29th	Elected in 1843. Re-elected in 1845. Retired.	1843–1853 [data missing]
Garnett Duncan (Louisville)	Whig	March 4, 1847 – March 3, 1849	30th	Elected in 1847. Retired.	1843–1853 [data missing]
Humphrey Marshall (New Castle)	Whig	March 4, 1849 – August 4, 1852	31st 32nd	Elected in 1849. Re-elected in 1851. Resigned when appointed U.S. Minister to China.	1843–1853 [data missing]
Vacant		August 4, 1852 – December 6, 1852	32nd		1843–1853 [data missing]
William Preston (Louisville)	Whig	December 6, 1852 – March 3, 1855	32nd 33rd	Elected to finish Marshall's term. Re-elected in 1853. Lost re-election.	1843–1853 [data missing]
William Preston (Louisville)	Whig	December 6, 1852 – March 3, 1855	32nd 33rd	Elected to finish Marshall's term. Re-elected in 1853. Lost re-election.	1853–1863 [data missing]
Humphrey Marshall (Springport)	Know Nothing	March 4, 1855 – March 3, 1859	34th 35th	Elected in 1855. Re-elected in 1857. Renominated but declined.	1853–1863 [data missing]
Robert Mallory (La Grange)	Opposition	March 4, 1859 – March 3, 1861	36th 37th	Elected in 1859. Re-elected in 1861. Redistricted to the 5th district.	1853–1863 [data missing]
Robert Mallory (La Grange)	Union Democratic	March 4, 1861 – March 3, 1863	36th 37th	Elected in 1859. Re-elected in 1861. Redistricted to the 5th district.	1853–1863 [data missing]
Brutus J. Clay (Paris)	Union Democratic	March 4, 1863 – March 3, 1865	38th	Elected in 1863. Retired.	1863–1873 [data missing]
George S. Shanklin (Nichoasville)	Democratic	March 4, 1865 – March 3, 1867	39th	Elected in 1865. Retired.	1863–1873 [data missing]
James B. Beck (Lexington)	Democratic	March 4, 1867 – March 3, 1875	40th 41st 42nd 43rd	Elected in 1867. Re-elected in 1868. Re-elected in 1870. Re-elected in 1872. Retired.	1863–1873 [data missing]
James B. Beck (Lexington)	Democratic	March 4, 1867 – March 3, 1875	40th 41st 42nd 43rd	Elected in 1867. Re-elected in 1868. Re-elected in 1870. Re-elected in 1872. Retired.	1873–1883 [data missing]
Joseph C. S. Blackburn (Versailles)	Democratic	March 4, 1875 – March 3, 1885	44th 45th 46th 47th 48th	Elected in 1874. Re-elected in 1876. Re-elected in 1878. Re-elected in 1880. Re-elected in 1882. Retired to run for U.S. senator.	1873–1883 [data missing]
Joseph C. S. Blackburn (Versailles)	Democratic	March 4, 1875 – March 3, 1885	44th 45th 46th 47th 48th	Elected in 1874. Re-elected in 1876. Re-elected in 1878. Re-elected in 1880. Re-elected in 1882. Retired to run for U.S. senator.	1883–1893 [data missing]
William C. P. Breckinridge (Lexington)	Democratic	March 4, 1885 – March 3, 1895	49th 50th 51st 52nd 53rd	Elected in 1884. Re-elected in 1886. Re-elected in 1888. Re-elected in 1890. Re-elected in 1892. Retired.	1883–1893 [data missing]
William C. P. Breckinridge (Lexington)	Democratic	March 4, 1885 – March 3, 1895	49th 50th 51st 52nd 53rd	Elected in 1884. Re-elected in 1886. Re-elected in 1888. Re-elected in 1890. Re-elected in 1892. Retired.	1893–1903 [data missing]
William C. Owens (Georgetown)	Democratic	March 4, 1895 – March 3, 1897	54th	Elected in 1894. Retired.	1893–1903 [data missing]
Evan E. Settle (Owenton)	Democratic	March 4, 1897 – November 16, 1899	55th 56th	Elected in 1896. Re-elected in 1898. Died.	1893–1903 [data missing]
Vacant		November 16, 1899 – December 18, 1899	56th		1893–1903 [data missing]
June W. Gayle (Owenton)	Democratic	December 18, 1899 – March 3, 1901	56th	Elected to finish Settle's term. Retired.	1893–1903 [data missing]
South Trimble (Frankfort)	Democratic	March 4, 1901 – March 3, 1907	57th 58th 59th	Elected in 1900. Re-elected in 1902. Re-elected in 1904. Retired to run for Lieutenant Governor of Kentucky.	1893–1903 [data missing]
South Trimble (Frankfort)	Democratic	March 4, 1901 – March 3, 1907	57th 58th 59th	Elected in 1900. Re-elected in 1902. Re-elected in 1904. Retired to run for Lieutenant Governor of Kentucky.	1903–1913 [data missing]
William P. Kimball (Lexington)	Democratic	March 4, 1907 – March 3, 1909	60th	Elected in 1906. Lost renomination.	1903–1913 [data missing]
J. Campbell Cantrill (Georgetown)	Democratic	March 4, 1909 – September 2, 1923	61st 62nd 63rd 64th 65th 66th 67th 68th	Elected in 1908. Re-elected in 1910. Re-elected in 1912. Re-elected in 1914. Re-elected in 1916. Re-elected in 1918. Re-elected in 1920. Re-elected in 1922. Died.	1903–1913 [data missing]
J. Campbell Cantrill (Georgetown)	Democratic	March 4, 1909 – September 2, 1923	61st 62nd 63rd 64th 65th 66th 67th 68th	Elected in 1908. Re-elected in 1910. Re-elected in 1912. Re-elected in 1914. Re-elected in 1916. Re-elected in 1918. Re-elected in 1920. Re-elected in 1922. Died.	1913–1933
Vacant		September 2, 1923 – November 30, 1923	68th		1913–1933
Joseph W. Morris (New Castle)	Democratic	November 30, 1923 – March 3, 1925	68th	Elected to finish Cantrill's term. Retired.	1913–1933
Virgil M. Chapman (Paris)	Democratic	March 4, 1925 – March 3, 1929	69th 70th	Elected in 1924. Re-elected in 1926. Lost re-election.	1913–1933
Robert E. L. Blackburn (Lexington)	Republican	March 4, 1929 – March 3, 1931	71st	Elected in 1928. Lost re-election.	1913–1933
Virgil M. Chapman (Paris)	Democratic	March 4, 1931 – March 3, 1933	72nd	Elected in 1930. Redistricted to the at-large district.	1913–1933
District inactive		March 4, 1933 – January 3, 1935	73rd		
Andrew J. May (Prestonsburg)	Democratic	January 3, 1935 – January 3, 1947	74th 75th 76th 77th 78th 79th	Redistricted from the at-large district and re-elected in 1934. Re-elected in 1936. Re-elected in 1938. Re-elected in 1940. Re-elected in 1942. Re-elected in 1944. Lost re-election.	1935–1953
Wendell H. Meade (Paintsville)	Republican	January 3, 1947 – January 3, 1949	80th	Elected in 1946. Lost re-election.	1935–1953
Carl D. Perkins (Hindman)	Democratic	January 3, 1949 – August 3, 1984	81st 82nd 83rd 84th 85th 86th 87th 88th 89th 90th 91st 92nd 93rd 94th 95th 96th 97th 98th	Elected in 1948. Re-elected in 1950. Re-elected in 1952. Re-elected in 1954. Re-elected in 1956. Re-elected in 1958. Re-elected in 1960. Re-elected in 1962. Re-elected in 1964. Re-elected in 1966. Re-elected in 1968. Re-elected in 1970. Re-elected in 1972. Re-elected in 1974. Re-elected in 1976. Re-elected in 1978. Re-elected in 1980. Re-elected in 1982. Died.	1935–1953
Carl D. Perkins (Hindman)	Democratic	January 3, 1949 – August 3, 1984	81st 82nd 83rd 84th 85th 86th 87th 88th 89th 90th 91st 92nd 93rd 94th 95th 96th 97th 98th	Elected in 1948. Re-elected in 1950. Re-elected in 1952. Re-elected in 1954. Re-elected in 1956. Re-elected in 1958. Re-elected in 1960. Re-elected in 1962. Re-elected in 1964. Re-elected in 1966. Re-elected in 1968. Re-elected in 1970. Re-elected in 1972. Re-elected in 1974. Re-elected in 1976. Re-elected in 1978. Re-elected in 1980. Re-elected in 1982. Died.	1953–1957
Carl D. Perkins (Hindman)	Democratic	January 3, 1949 – August 3, 1984	81st 82nd 83rd 84th 85th 86th 87th 88th 89th 90th 91st 92nd 93rd 94th 95th 96th 97th 98th	Elected in 1948. Re-elected in 1950. Re-elected in 1952. Re-elected in 1954. Re-elected in 1956. Re-elected in 1958. Re-elected in 1960. Re-elected in 1962. Re-elected in 1964. Re-elected in 1966. Re-elected in 1968. Re-elected in 1970. Re-elected in 1972. Re-elected in 1974. Re-elected in 1976. Re-elected in 1978. Re-elected in 1980. Re-elected in 1982. Died.	1957–1963
Carl D. Perkins (Hindman)	Democratic	January 3, 1949 – August 3, 1984	81st 82nd 83rd 84th 85th 86th 87th 88th 89th 90th 91st 92nd 93rd 94th 95th 96th 97th 98th	Elected in 1948. Re-elected in 1950. Re-elected in 1952. Re-elected in 1954. Re-elected in 1956. Re-elected in 1958. Re-elected in 1960. Re-elected in 1962. Re-elected in 1964. Re-elected in 1966. Re-elected in 1968. Re-elected in 1970. Re-elected in 1972. Re-elected in 1974. Re-elected in 1976. Re-elected in 1978. Re-elected in 1980. Re-elected in 1982. Died.	1963–1967
Carl D. Perkins (Hindman)	Democratic	January 3, 1949 – August 3, 1984	81st 82nd 83rd 84th 85th 86th 87th 88th 89th 90th 91st 92nd 93rd 94th 95th 96th 97th 98th	Elected in 1948. Re-elected in 1950. Re-elected in 1952. Re-elected in 1954. Re-elected in 1956. Re-elected in 1958. Re-elected in 1960. Re-elected in 1962. Re-elected in 1964. Re-elected in 1966. Re-elected in 1968. Re-elected in 1970. Re-elected in 1972. Re-elected in 1974. Re-elected in 1976. Re-elected in 1978. Re-elected in 1980. Re-elected in 1982. Died.	1967–1973
Carl D. Perkins (Hindman)	Democratic	January 3, 1949 – August 3, 1984	81st 82nd 83rd 84th 85th 86th 87th 88th 89th 90th 91st 92nd 93rd 94th 95th 96th 97th 98th	Elected in 1948. Re-elected in 1950. Re-elected in 1952. Re-elected in 1954. Re-elected in 1956. Re-elected in 1958. Re-elected in 1960. Re-elected in 1962. Re-elected in 1964. Re-elected in 1966. Re-elected in 1968. Re-elected in 1970. Re-elected in 1972. Re-elected in 1974. Re-elected in 1976. Re-elected in 1978. Re-elected in 1980. Re-elected in 1982. Died.	1973–1983
Carl D. Perkins (Hindman)	Democratic	January 3, 1949 – August 3, 1984	81st 82nd 83rd 84th 85th 86th 87th 88th 89th 90th 91st 92nd 93rd 94th 95th 96th 97th 98th	Elected in 1948. Re-elected in 1950. Re-elected in 1952. Re-elected in 1954. Re-elected in 1956. Re-elected in 1958. Re-elected in 1960. Re-elected in 1962. Re-elected in 1964. Re-elected in 1966. Re-elected in 1968. Re-elected in 1970. Re-elected in 1972. Re-elected in 1974. Re-elected in 1976. Re-elected in 1978. Re-elected in 1980. Re-elected in 1982. Died.	1983–1993
Vacant		August 3, 1984 – November 6, 1984	98th		1983–1993
Chris Perkins (Leburn)	Democratic	November 6, 1984 – January 3, 1993	98th 99th 100th 101st 102nd	Elected to finish his father's term. Also elected to the next full term. Re-elected in 1986. Re-elected in 1988. Re-elected in 1990. Retired.	1983–1993
District eliminated January 3, 1993
