= Charles Clay (patriot) =

American clergyman, planter, patriot and politician

Member of the Virginia Ratifying Convention for Bedford County
- In office June 2-June 26, 1788 Serving with John Trigg

Personal details
- Born: Charles Clay; December 24, 1745 Goochland County, Colony of Virginia
- Died: February 8, 1820 (aged 74) Bedford County, Virginia
- Party: Anti-Federalist
- Spouse: Edith Landon Davies
- Relations: Matthew Clay, Green Clay (brothers)
- Children: 4 sons including Odin Green Clay

Military service
- Allegiance: United States
- Branch/service: Virginia Militia
- Battles/wars: American Revolutionary War

Charles Clay (December 24, 1745 – February 8, 1820) was an American planter, clergyman and politician in Virginia who represented Bedford County, Virginia in the Virginia Ratifying Convention. Today he is best known either for his friendship with Thomas Jefferson, or as a member of a political family which included his brothers Congressman Matthew Clay and Kentucky Senate president and General Green Clay, as well as his four sons, especially Odin Green Clay who continued the political tradition of this branch of the family as well as became president of the Virginia and Tennessee Railroad Company.

== Early life and education ==
He was born to Martha Green and her planter husband Charles Clay in then-vast Goochland County in the Colony of Virginia, probably in the part that became Cumberland County in 1749 and again split in 1777 and became Powhatan County. He received a private education appropriate to his class. Younger brothers included future Congressman Matthew Clay (1754–1815) and General Green Clay (1757–1828), who were also well educated. Other siblings included Rev. Eleazer Clay and Thomas, Henry and Martha Clay. His father had also patented (claimed) much land in what became eastern Pittsylvania County, which Matthew Clay would ultimately inherit from a sibling (but which at the time of Matthew's birth was in Halifax County).

== Career ==
After traveling to England for ordination by the Bishop of London, Clay served as rector of St. Anne's Parish in Albemarle County, Virginia during the American Revolutionary War (1772–1785). His most famous parishioner (and friend) was lawyer and planter Thomas Jefferson who became governor of Virginia during the conflict, as well as President of the United States decades later. However, Clay left that parish after disestablishment of the Episcopal Church led to failure to pay his salary, as well as arrears in repairs to his glebe home. He made unsuccessful attempts to secure those payments including through the county court and by petitioning the Virginia House of Delegates. Rev. Clay then took a position with Manchester Parish in Chesterfield County, Virginia (now within the Richmond city limits but then across the James River from Virginia's new capital). Rev. Clay participated in the 1785 convention that organized the Protestant Episcopal Church in Virginia, as well as the diocesan convention the next year, before abandoning his ministry by 1787.

Clay also had a plantation called "Petty Grove" in Bedford County, Virginia, near Thomas Jefferson's Poplar Forest. Like Jefferson and other nearby planters, Clay used enslaved labor to operate those plantations. By his death, he also owned land in Amherst, Buckingham and Campbell Counties as well as town lots in Lynchburg.

Clay served as justice of the peace in Bedford county from 1782 until 1785. Bedford County voters elected Clay and John Trigg as their representatives to the Virginia Ratifying Convention in Richmond, during which his brother Green Clay served as one of the representatives for Madison County (which would later become Kentucky). Like his brother and Trigg, Clay voted to require amendments to the proposed new federal constitution and then voted (unsuccessfully) against ratification. On the last day he voted for a proposed amendment to reduce Congress' taxation powers. Clay also unsuccessfully ran for a seat in the U.S. House of Representatives in 1790 and 1792 before ending his political career.

== Personal life ==
Clay married Editha Landon Daviews on July 4, 1796, who bore four sons who survived to adulthood.

== Death and legacy ==
Clay died at home on February 8, 1820, and was buried on the estate. A very large cairn of stones reportedly marks his gravesite, either to deter road building in the area, or because Clay required each of his sons to throw a rock on the pile for every wrongful act they committed. His last will provided for his widow as well as distributed his land and slaves and shares of the Farmers Bank of Virginia among his sons, and also mentioned a small silver cane given him by Thomas Jefferson.
