= Battle of Middle Creek =

Battle of the American Civil War

Coordinates: 37.6507°N 82.8147°W

- Part of the American Civil War
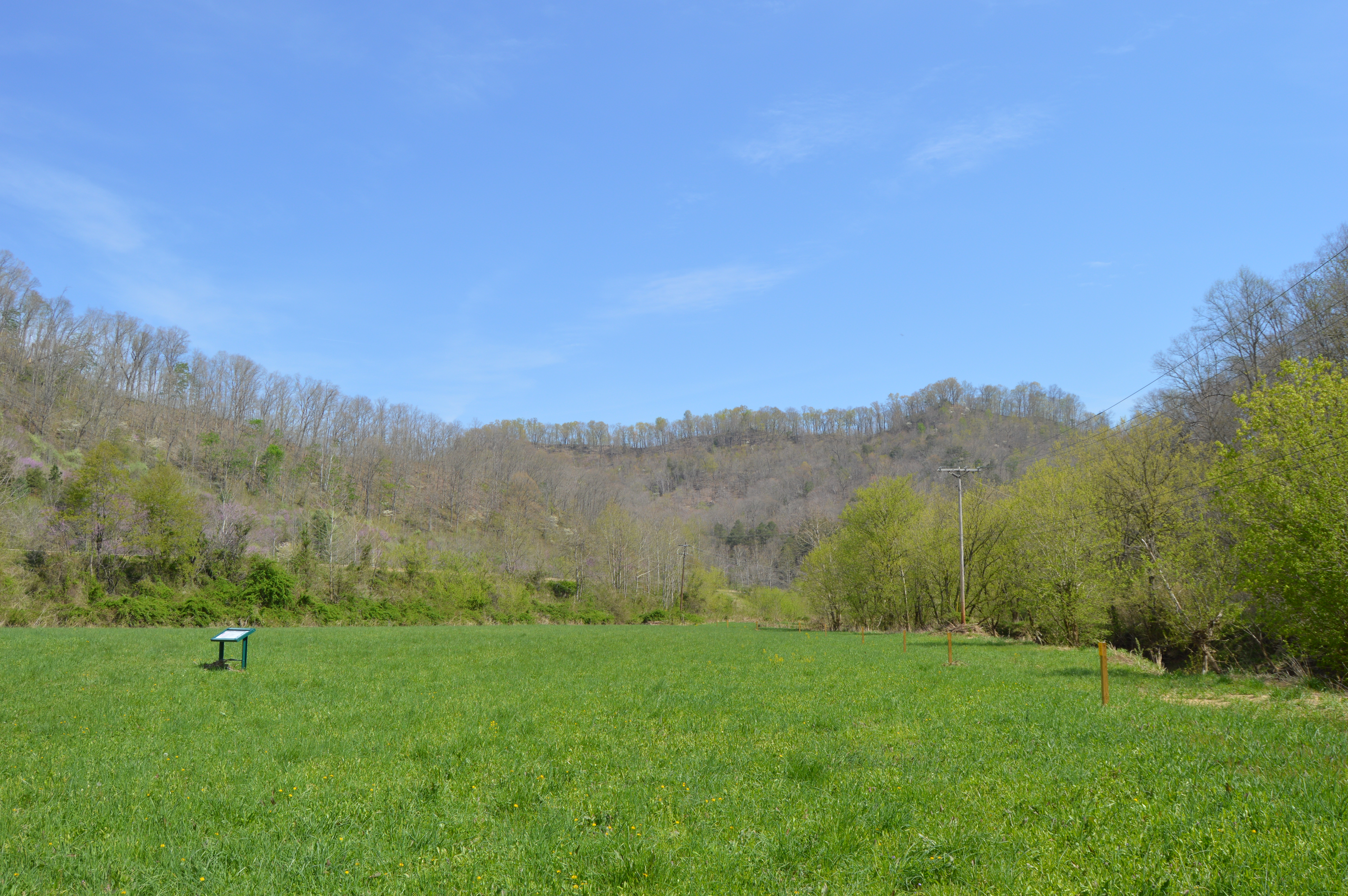
- Eastern portion of the field, looking toward Garfield's command post
Date	January 10, 1862
Location	Floyd County, Kentucky
Result	Union victory

Belligerents
United States (Union)	(Confederate States of America) CSA (Confederacy)

Commanders and leaders
James A. Garfield	Humphrey Marshall

Units involved
18th Brigade (consisted of 14th Kentucky (USA), 22nd Kentucky (USA), 1st Kentucky Cavalry (USA), 40th Ohio, and 42nd Ohio)	(5th Kentucky (CSA), 54th Virginia, Jeffress' Artillery Battery, cavalry companies of Cameron, Clay, Holliday, Shawhan, Stone, Thomas)

Strength
2,100	2,500

Casualties and losses
27	65

- Middle Creek Battlefield
- U.S. National Register of Historic Places
- U.S. National Historic Landmark
- Location within Kentucky Location within the United States
- Nearest city: Prestonsburg, Kentucky
- Built: 1862
- NRHP reference No.: 91001665
- Added to NRHP: March 26, 1992

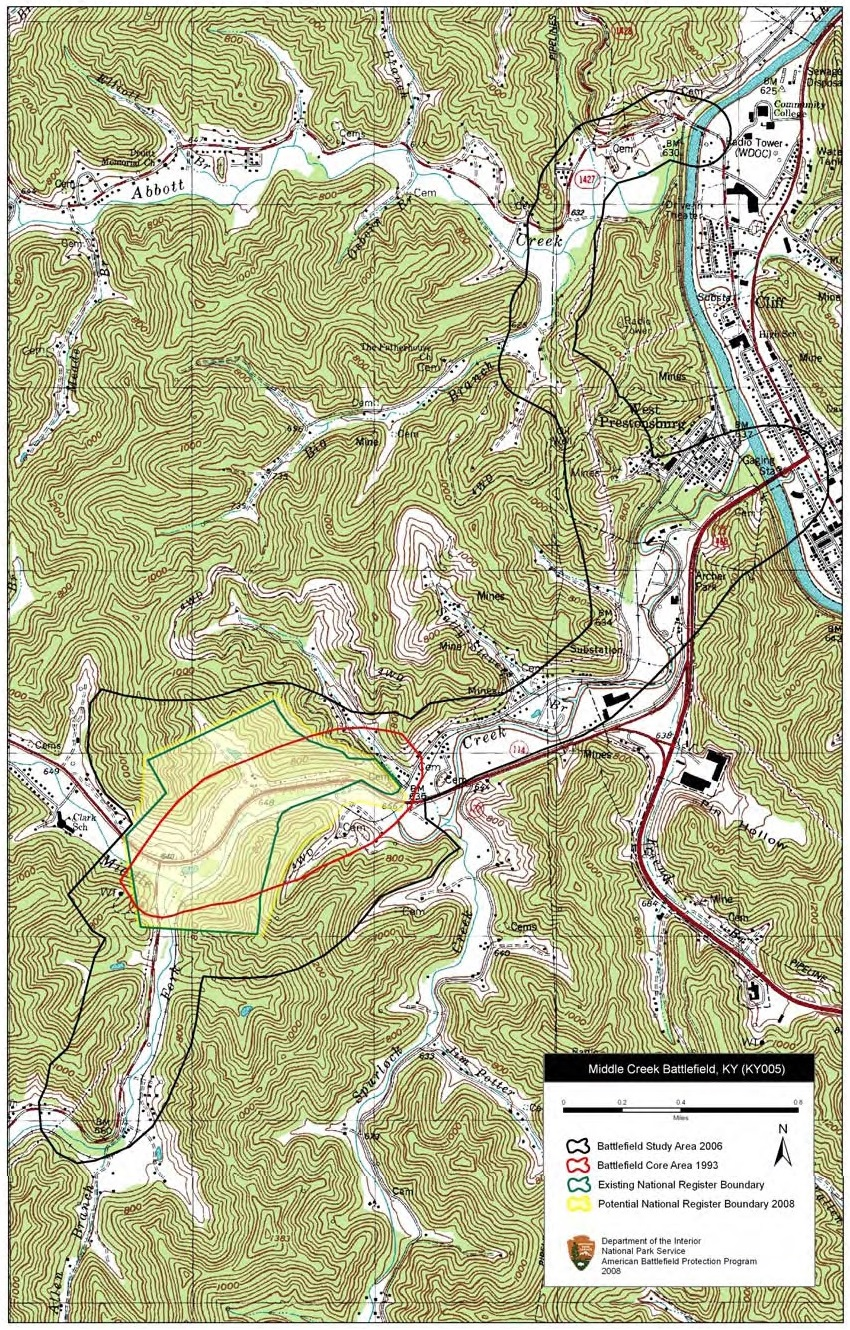
Map of Middle Creek Battlefield core and study areas by the American Battlefield Protection Program.

The Battle of Middle Creek was an engagement fought January 10, 1862, in Eastern Kentucky during the American Civil War. It was the only battle personally commanded by future president James A. Garfield, then a colonel in the Union Army.

== Background ==
More than 1 month after Confederate Colonel John S. Williams left Kentucky, following the fight at Ivy Mountain, Brig. Gen. Humphrey Marshall led another force into Eastern Kentucky to continue recruiting activities. From his headquarters in Paintsville, on the Levisa Fork of the Big Sandy River, northwest of Prestonsburg, Marshall recruited volunteers. He raised a force of more than 2,000 men by early January, but could only partially equip them.

== Battle ==
Union Brig. Gen. Don Carlos Buell directed Col. James A. Garfield, the future president, to force Marshall to retreat back into Virginia. Leaving Louisa, Garfield took command of the 18th Brigade and began his march south on Paintsville. He compelled the Confederates to abandon Paintsville and retreat to the vicinity of Prestonsburg. Garfield slowly headed south, but swampy areas and numerous streams slowed his movements, and he arrived in the vicinity of Marshall on January 9, 1862. Heading out at 4:00 a.m. on January 10, Garfield marched a mile west near the Forks of Middle Creek, fought off the Confederate cavalry, and turned west to attack Marshall. Marshall had put his men in line of battle north and east of the creek near its forks. Garfield attacked shortly after noon, and the fighting continued for most of the afternoon until Union reinforcements arrived in time to dissuade the Confederates from assailing the Federal left. Instead, the Confederates retired south and were ordered back to Virginia on January 24. Garfield's force moved to Prestonsburg after the fight and then retired to Paintsville. Union forces had halted the Confederate 1861 offensive in Kentucky, and Middle Creek demonstrated that their strength had not diminished.

== Aftermath ==
The Battle of Middle Creek, along with the Battle of Mill Springs a little over a week later, cemented Union control of Eastern Kentucky until Confederate Gen. Braxton Bragg launched his offensive in the summer and fall of 1862. Following these two January victories in Kentucky, the Federals carried the war into Tennessee in February.

In October 1992, the battlefield was designated a National Historic Landmark by the National Park Service.

== See also ==
- List of battles fought in Kentucky
