= Andrew J. May =

American politician from Kentucky (1875–1959)

Andrew May
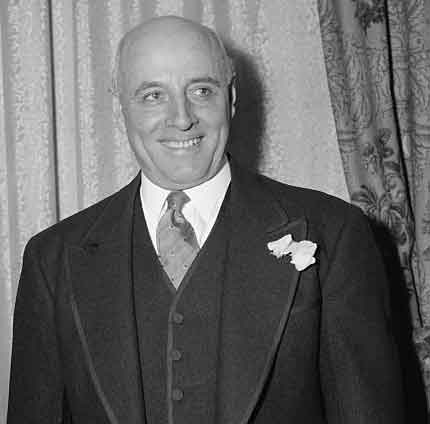
- May in 1939

Member of the U.S. House of Representatives from Kentucky
- In office March 4, 1931 – January 3, 1947
- Preceded by: Katherine G. Langley (10th); District established (AL & 7th)
- Succeeded by: District eliminated (10th & AL); Wendell H. Meade (7th)
- Constituency: 10th district (1931-33); At-large district (1933-35); 7th district (1935-47)

Personal details
- Born: Andrew Jackson May; June 24, 1875 near Langley, Kentucky, U.S.
- Died: September 6, 1959 (aged 84) Prestonsburg, Kentucky, U.S.
- Party: Democratic
- Education: Union University (LLB)

Andrew Jackson May (June 24, 1875 – September 6, 1959) was an attorney and U.S. representative from Kentucky, serving from 1931 to 1947. He was an influential New Deal-era Democratic politician and chairman of the House Military Affairs Committee during World War II, famous for his role as chief architect of the Peacetime Selective Service Act.

During the war, May revealed classified naval information in a press conference, and after the war was convicted for bribery in connection with wartime munitions contracts.

== Education and early career ==
May was born on Beaver Creek, near Prestonsburg in Floyd County, Kentucky, on June 24, 1875. On June 25, 1898, he and his twin brother William H. May graduated from Southern Normal University Law School in Huntingdon, Tennessee (later named Union University, Jackson, Tennessee). He was admitted to the bar the same year, commencing his law practice in Prestonsburg. May and his brother formed the law firm of May & May which was not dissolved until the death of his brother on February 20, 1921. May was county attorney of Floyd County, Kentucky, from 1901 to 1909; and special judge of the circuit court of Johnson and Martin Counties in 1925 and 1926. During this time, May also engaged in Democratic Party politics, agricultural pursuits, coal mining, and banking.

== US Representative ==
In 1928, May ran for US Representative as a Democrat against incumbent Katherine G. Langley in the heavily Republican 10th District, and lost. In 1930, he ran again and defeated Langley. In the 1930 reapportionment of the House, Kentucky lost its 10th seat; but new districts were not drawn in time for the 1932 election. All nine seats were elected in a state-wide at-large election, including May, who was re-elected. Districts were established by 1934; May was re-elected from the new 7th District that year and in five subsequent elections, serving until 1947. He was defeated for re-election in 1946 by Republican Wendell H. Meade.

May was a consistent supporter of President Franklin D. Roosevelt and of Roosevelt's New Deal programs. He helped push through the Social Security Act, and the GI Bill of Rights, both important New Deal programs.

=== Chairman of the House Military Affairs Committee ===
May was chairman of the powerful House Military Affairs Committee during the Seventy-sixth through Seventy-ninth Congresses (1939–1947). As Military Affairs chairman, May wielded immense influence before and during World War II. He was the chief architect of the Peacetime Selective Service Act of 1940, which provided for conscription into the armed forces while the US was not yet at war. This program enabled the armed forces to prepare for war before the US was attacked at Pearl Harbor in December 1941.

Representative John W. McCormack (D-MA) wrote to May:

"As chairman of the all important House Committee on the Military Affairs before Pearl Harbor and during the war, you led the fight for the passage of legislation necessary to defend and preserve our country. Your post, as Chairman of the House Military Affairs Committee is not only a most important position but in addition, a most trying one. History will record that the part you played in the passage of necessary legislation would justifiably place you as one of the foremost Americans of this generation."

May was considered neither an isolationist or a warmonger. He did speak out frequently about the war in Europe. May was quoted as saying, "it will not be left up to the President or the Congress or the people of the United States, whether or not we go to war." May continued, "It will be decided by the impersonation of hatred Adolph Hitler, who decided it also for Poland, France, Belgium, and Holland."

=== The May Incident ===
May was responsible for the release of highly classified military information during World War II known as the May Incident. U.S. submarines had been conducting a successful undersea war against Japanese shipping during World War II, frequently escaping their anti-submarine depth charge attacks. May revealed the deficiencies of Japanese depth-charge tactics in a press conference held in June 1943 on his return from a war zone junket. At this press conference, he revealed the highly sensitive fact that American submarines had a high survival rate because Japanese depth charges were exploding at too shallow a depth. Various press associations sent this news story over their wires and many newspapers published it, including one in Honolulu, Hawaii.

After the news became public, Japanese naval antisubmarine forces adjusted their depth charges to explode at a greater depth. Vice Admiral Charles A. Lockwood, commander of the U.S. submarine fleet in the Pacific, estimated that May's security breach cost the United States Navy as many as 10 submarines and 800 crewmen killed in action. He said, "I hear Congressman May said the Jap depth charges are not set deep enough. He would be pleased to know that the Japs set them deeper now." A report from the U.S. Navy's Pacific Submarine Fleet determined that Japanese anti-submarine warfare (ASW) forces failed to uncover the maximum test depth ability of U.S. fleet submarines during the war. However, the report made no finding as to whether or not Japanese ASW forces altered their depth charge attacks to deeper settings as a consequence of May's revelation to the press.

=== War profiteering allegations ===
May became involved with Murray and Henry Garsson, New York businessmen who sought lucrative wartime munitions contracts from the US government.

In 1946, May was investigated by the Truman Committee, now chaired by Senator James Mead (D-NY). May had frequently telephoned the Army Ordnance Department and other government officials on behalf of the Garssons and their associates, urging that they get war contracts, draft deferments, and other benefits. So numerous were these interventions that one ordnance official referred to them as "blitz calls". The Committee discovered that May had received substantial cash payments and other inducements from the Garssons. "The Garssons weren't sympathetic characters to the public because they made a lot of money on the war, and they were Jewish, so Representative May got tied with them in the public image and they all sort of got tarred with the same brush as people who somehow made out while people were dying, and illegally so."

=== Bribery conviction ===
Following news reports of irregularities concerning his conduct in office, May was an unsuccessful candidate for re-election in 1946 to the Eightieth Congress. The bribery scandal was intensified by exposure of excessive profit-taking in the Garsson munition business, and that the Garsson factory produced 4.2-inch mortar shells with defective fuzes, resulting in premature detonation and the deaths of 38 American soldiers.

May was charged with bribery by the federal government. He owned Cumberland Lumber Company, which sold munition shipping to the Garssons. The government alleged that this arrangement was a disguised pay-off to May for using his influence for the Garssons.

On July 3, 1947, after less than two hours of jury deliberation, May was convicted. Murray and Henry Garsson were also convicted. May appealed his verdict all the way up to the Supreme Court, which refused to hear his case. May was sent to prison at the age of 74, and served nine months in prison.

However, he continued to retain influence in Democratic party politics, and President Truman granted May a full pardon in 1952. Unable to revive his political career, he returned home to practice law until his death.

== Death ==
May died in Prestonsburg, Kentucky on September 6, 1959, and is buried in Mayo Cemetery.

In 1962 Governor of Kentucky Bert T. Combs opened the May lodge at Jenny Wiley State Resort Park in Prestonsburg, Kentucky in honor of the congressman.

== See also ==
- List of American federal politicians convicted of crimes
- List of federal political scandals in the United States
- News leak
- List of people pardoned or granted clemency by the president of the United States

U.S. House of Representatives
Preceded by Katherine G. Langley	Member of the U.S. House of Representatives from Kentucky's 10th congressional district 1931–1933	Constituency abolished
Preceded by Finley Hamilton	Member of the U.S. House of Representatives from Kentucky's at-large congressional district 1933–1935	Succeeded by Brent Spence
Preceded by Virgil M. Chapman	Member of the U.S. House of Representatives from Kentucky's 7th congressional district 1935–1947	Succeeded by Wendell H. Meade
Preceded by J. Lister Hill	Chair of the House Military Affairs Committee; 1939–1947	Succeeded by Walter G. Andrews
