= 39th Kentucky Infantry Regiment =

- Active: November 18, 1862, to September 15, 1865
- Country: United States
- Allegiance: Union
- Branch: Infantry
- Engagements: Battle of Salyersville; Battle of Saltville; Second Battle of Saltville

The 39th Kentucky Infantry Regiment was an infantry regiment that served in the Union Army during the American Civil War.

== Service ==
The 39th Kentucky Infantry Regiment was organized at Peach Orchard in Lawrence County, Kentucky, on November 18, 1862. It mustered in for a three-year enlistment on February 16, 1863, under the command of Colonel John Dils Jr. Although the regiment was mounted, it was never designated as mounted infantry.

The regiment was attached to District of Eastern Kentucky, Department of the Ohio, to June 1863. 1st Brigade, 4th Division, XXIII Corps, Department of the Ohio, to August 1863. District of Eastern Kentucky, 1st Division, XXIII Corps, to April 1864. 1st Brigade, 1st Division, District of Kentucky, 5th Division, XXIII Corps, to July 1864. 3rd Brigade, 1st Division, District of Kentucky, to December 1864. Louisa, Kentucky, District and Department of Kentucky, to September 1865.

The 39th Kentucky Infantry mustered out of service on September 15, 1865.

== Detailed service ==
Action near Piketon, Ky., November 5, 1862. Wireman's Shoals, Big Sandy River, December 4. Skirmishes in Floyd County December 4 and near Prestonburg December 4–5. Near Prestonburg December 31. Near Louisa, Ky., March 25–26, 1863. Piketon April 13 and 15. Beaver Creek, Floyd County, June 27. Mouth of Coal Run, Pike County, July 2. Expedition from Beaver Creek into southwest Virginia July 3–11. Pond Creek July 6. Clark's Neck and Carter County August 27. Marrowbone Creek September 22. Terman's Ferry January 9, 1864. Laurel Creek, W. Va., February 12. Operations in eastern Kentucky March 28-April 16. Forks of Beaver March 31. Brushy Creek April 7. Paintsville April 13. Half Mountain, Magoffin County, April 14, 1864. Battle of Salyersville April 16, 1864. Expedition from Louisa to Rockhouse Creek May 9–13 (Company B). Pond Creek, Pike County, May 16. Pike County May 18. Operations against Morgans last raid May 31-June 20, 1864. Battle of Mount Sterling June 9, 1864. Battle of Cynthiana June 12, 1864. Burbridge's Expedition into southwest Virginia September 20-October 17. First Battle of Saltville October 2, 1864. Stoneman's Expedition into southwest Virginia December 10–29. Bristol, Tenn., December 13, 1864. Arlington, Va., December 15. Battle of Marion, Va., December 17–18. Second Battle of Saltville, Va., December 20–21. Capture and destruction of salt works. Duty in the Big Sandy Valley and in eastern Kentucky guarding and protecting the country until September 1865.

== Casualties ==
The regiment lost a total of 234 men during service; 3 officers and 24 enlisted men killed or mortally wounded, 3 officers and 194 enlisted men died of disease.

== Commanders ==
- Colonel John Dils Jr.

== See also ==
- List of Kentucky Civil War Units
- Kentucky in the Civil War
