= Chris Perkins (politician) =

American lawyer and politician (b. 1954)

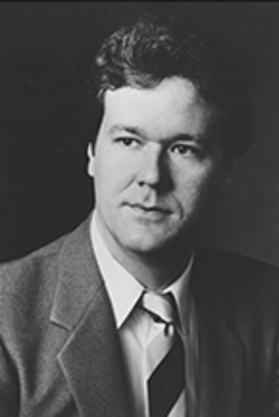
- Official Portrait, c. 1984-93

Member of the U.S. House of Representatives from Kentucky's 7th district
- In office November 6, 1984 – January 3, 1993
- Preceded by: Carl D. Perkins
- Succeeded by: Constituency abolished

Member of the Kentucky House of Representatives from the 92nd district
- In office January 1, 1982 – November 6, 1984
- Preceded by: Bill Weinberg
- Succeeded by: Jim Rose

Personal details
- Born: Carl Christopher Perkins; August 6, 1954 (age 71) Washington, D.C., U.S.
- Party: Democratic
- Relatives: Carl D. Perkins (father)
- Education: Davidson College (BA); University of Louisville (JD); Louisville Presbyterian Theological Seminary (MDiv, ThM)

Carl Christopher Perkins (born August 6, 1954) is an American lawyer and politician who served as the United States representative from the 7th district of Kentucky from 1984 to 1993. Perkins was convicted on three federal felony corruption charges in relation to the House banking scandal.

== Early life and career ==
Perkins is the son of Carl D. Perkins, who represented Kentucky in the House of Representatives from 1949 to 1984. Perkins was born in Washington, D.C., and graduated from Fort Hunt High School, Alexandria, Virginia in 1972. He earned his B.A. from Davidson College in 1976. In 1978, he earned a J.D. degree from the University of Louisville. He worked for some time as a lawyer in private practice.

== Political career ==
=== Kentucky House of Representatives ===
From 1982 to 1984, he was a member of the Kentucky House of Representatives, representing Kentucky's 92nd House district.

=== United States House of Representatives ===
Perkins was elected simultaneously as a Democrat to the 98th and the 99th Congress by special election to fill the vacancy caused by the death of his father. Perkins was reelected to the three succeeding Congresses (November 6, 1984 – January 3, 1993). The seat that he held, Kentucky's 7th district, was eliminated by redistricting and became Kentucky's 5th district and some counties in Kentucky's 4th district. He did not seek re-election to Congress in 1992 from the new 5th district, in part due to the House banking scandal.

==== House Banking Scandal ====
In 1994, Perkins agreed to plead guilty on three felony charges in connection with the House banking scandal. The following year, he was sentenced to 21 months in federal prison for misusing hundreds of thousands of dollars in campaign contributions and improperly obtaining bank loans. He was also placed on three years' supervised probation, ordered to perform 250 hours of community service, and told to complete any treatment for alcoholism deemed necessary by his probation officer.

== Religious work ==
After his release from prison, Perkins attended Louisville Seminary where he received his Master of Divinity in 2003 and Master of Theology in 2008. He became an ordained Presbyterian minister, and served a church in Ezel, Kentucky, before becoming pastor of Enslow Park Presbyterian Church in Huntington, West Virginia.

== See also ==
- List of American federal politicians convicted of crimes
- List of federal political scandals in the United States

U.S. House of Representatives
Preceded by Carl D. Perkins	Member of the U.S. House of Representatives from Kentucky's 7th congressional district 1984–1993	Constituency abolished
U.S. order of precedence (ceremonial)
Preceded by George Holding as Former U.S. Representative	Order of precedence of the United States as Former U.S. Representative	Succeeded by Ben Chandler as Former U.S. Representative
