= 1866–67 United States House of Representatives elections =

House elections for the 40th U.S. Congress

- June 4, 1866– September 6, 1867 (Note: Excludes states readmitted after the start of Congress.)

All 193 (Note: Including late elections.) (Note: An additional 50 seats were vacant during Reconstruction.) seats in the United States House of Representatives 97 seats needed for a majority
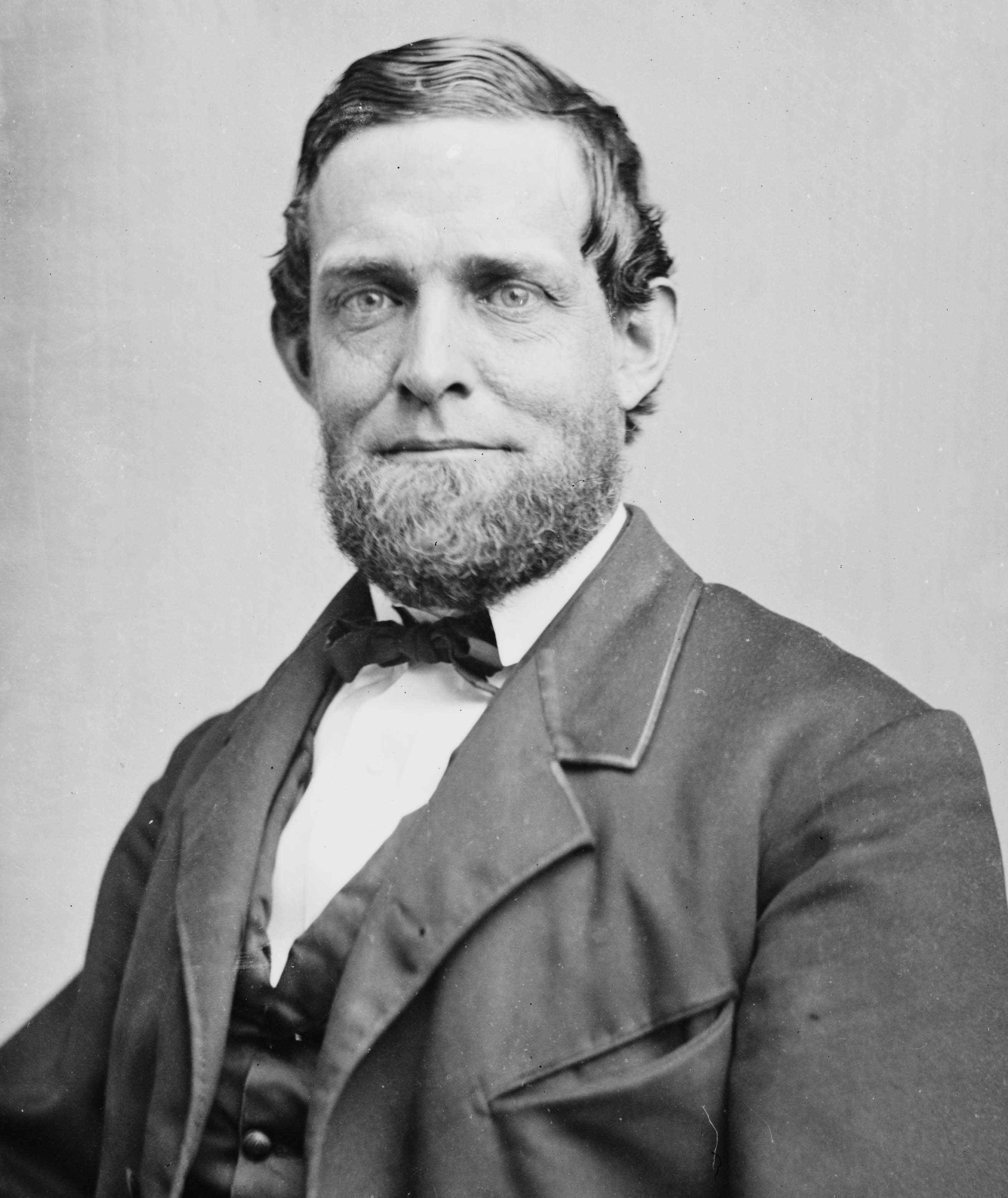

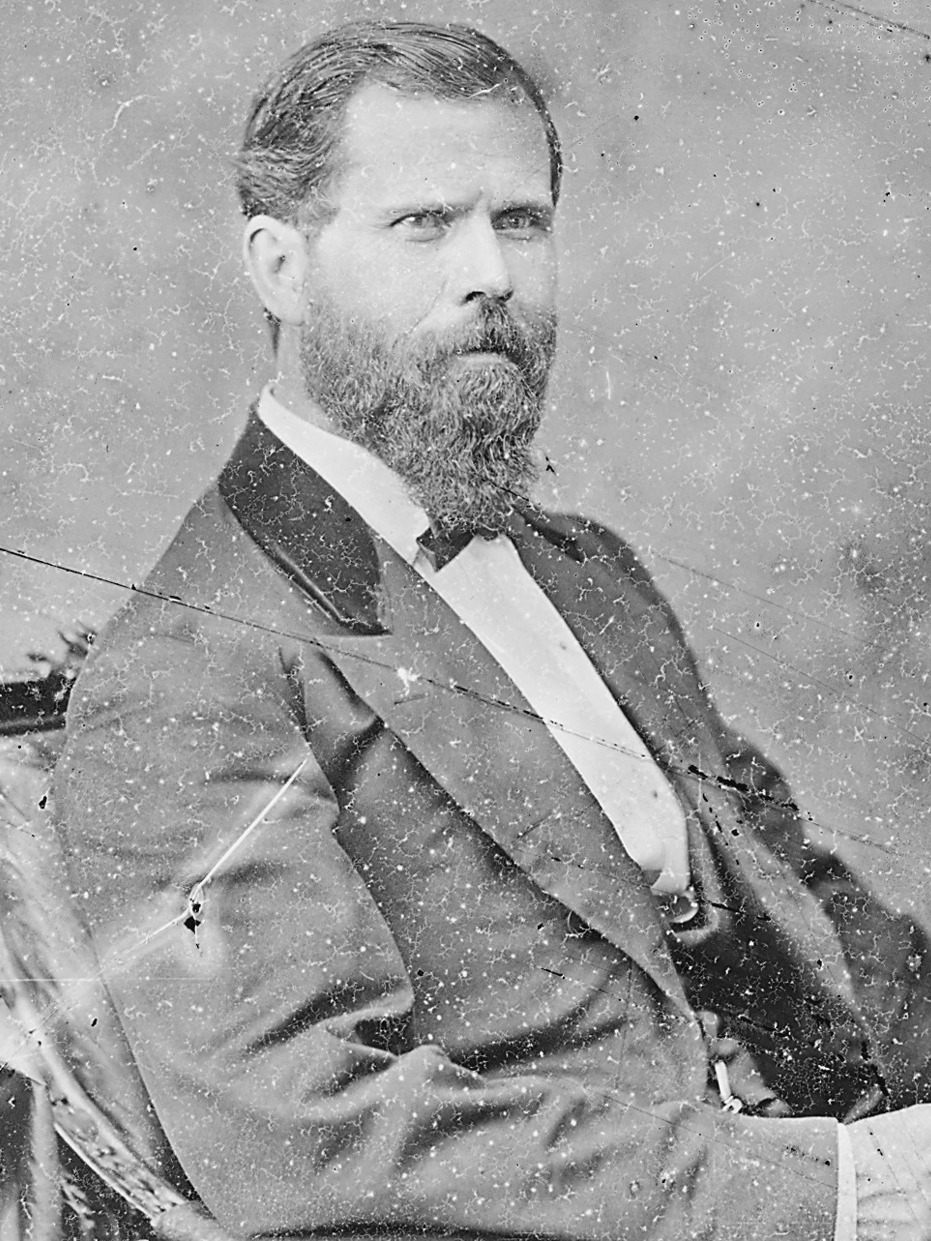
	Majority party	Minority party
Leader	Schuyler Colfax	Samuel Marshall
Party	Republican	Democratic
Leader's seat	Indiana 9th	Illinois 11th
Last election	147 seats	35 seats
Seats won	144 (Note: Republicans lost 1 seat in special elections held before December 2, 1867, reducing their caucus to 143 seats.)	45 (Note: Democrats gained 1 seat in special elections held before December 2, 1867, increasing their caucus to 46 seats.)
Seat change	▼3	▲10
Popular vote	2,611,309	1,919,507
Percentage	55.36%	40.69%
Swing	▲1.89pp (Note: In comparison to the vote for the National Union coalition in the last election cycle.)	▼1.28pp
	Third party	Fourth party
Party	Conservative	Independent
Last election	9 seats	1 seat (Note: Including 1 Independent Unionist, John R. Kelso, from Missouri's 4th congressional district.)
Seats won	2 (Note: Conservatives lost 1 seat in special elections held before December 2, 1867, reducing their caucus to 1 seat.)	1 (Note: Including 1 Independent Republican, Lewis Selye, from New York's 28th congressional district.) (Note: Independents gained 1 seat in special elections held before December 2, 1867, increasing their caucus to 2 seats.)
Seat change	▼7	Steady
Popular vote	94,455	83,205
Percentage	2.00%	1.76%
Swing	▼0.19pp	▲0.70pp
- Results; Republican gain Democratic gain Radical gain Republican hold Democratic hold Radical hold Conservative hold Independent gain Not seated No election
Speaker before election
Schuyler Colfax
Republican
Elected Speaker
Schuyler Colfax
Republican

The 1866–67 United States House of Representatives elections took place between June 4, 1866, and September 6, 1867, to elect the 193 members and seven non-voting delegates of the House of Representatives. The Republican Party retained its majority in the first midterm elections following the end of the American Civil War.

Republicans and Unionists won 147 seats as the National Union Party in elections held in 1864 and 1865. Following the assassination of Abraham Lincoln, Andrew Johnson attempted to preserve the Union Party as a vehicle for his political ambitions. Johnson's supporters held the 1866 National Union Convention at Philadelphia in an attempt to rally support for the president's policies. Johnson's handling of Reconstruction, especially his veto of the Civil Rights Act of 1866, split the Union Party between moderate and radical Republicans, and the president's dwindling conservative allies. Pro-Johnson Unionists contested these elections as the Conservative Union Party or simply Conservatives, while Johnson's opponents were called Republican Unionists or Republicans. Despite the efforts of Johnson's advisors, the Conservative movement was quickly folded into the Democratic Party, which reemerged as the main opposition to the Republicans in the postwar era.

The elections resulted in a stunning rebuke of the incumbent administration. Johnson's national speaking tour failed to win over the voting public and seriously damaged the president's reputation. Republicans from the border states and the Northern United States won over two-thirds of the seats in the lower chamber, more than enough to override a presidential veto. In Maryland and Missouri, the Republican candidates ran as Radical or Unconditional Unionists. Democrats won most of the remaining seats, while only two districts (Missouri's 3rd and New York's 6th) chose Conservative representatives. Of the former Confederate states holding elections in 1866 and 1867, only the representatives from Tennessee were initially seated; a further eight states held elections following their readmission in 1868.

== Results ==
=== Federal ===
↓
45	1	3	144
Democratic	(Note: 1 vacancy.)	(Note: 2 Conservatives and 1 Independent Republican.)	Republican

=== Results by state ===
State	Type	Date	Total seats	Democratic		Conservative		Republican	
State	Type	Date	Total seats	Seats	Change	Seats	Change	Seats	Change
Oregon	At-large	June 4, 1866	1	0	Steady	0	Steady	1	Steady
Vermont	Districts	Sep 4, 1866	3	0	Steady	0	Steady	3	Steady
Maine	Districts	Sep 10, 1866	5	0	Steady	0	Steady	5	Steady
Indiana	Districts	Oct 9, 1866	11	3	▲1	0	Steady	8	▼1
Iowa	Districts	Oct 9, 1866	6	0	Steady	0	Steady	6	Steady
Nebraska	At-large	Oct 9, 1866	1	0	Steady	0	Steady	1	Steady
Ohio	Districts	Oct 9, 1866	19	3	▲1	0	Steady	16	▼1
Pennsylvania	Districts	Oct 9, 1866	24	6	▼3	0	Steady	18	▲3
West Virginia	Districts	Oct 25, 1866	3	0	Steady	0	Steady	3	Steady
Delaware	At-large	Nov 6, 1866 (Election Day) (Note: In 1845, Congress passed a law providing for a uniform date for choosing presidential electors (see: Statutes at Large, 28th Congress, 2nd Session, p. 721). Congressional elections were unaffected by this law, but the date was gradually adopted by the states for congressional elections as well.)	1	1	Steady	0	Steady	0	Steady
Illinois	Mixed (Note: 13 single-member districts and 1 at-large seat.)	Nov 6, 1866 (Election Day)	14	3	Steady	0	Steady	11	Steady
Kansas	At-large	Nov 6, 1866 (Election Day)	1	0	Steady	0	Steady	1	Steady
Maryland	Districts	Nov 6, 1866 (Election Day)	5	3	▲1	0	Steady	1	▼2
Massachusetts	Districts	Nov 6, 1866 (Election Day)	10	0	Steady	0	Steady	10	Steady
Michigan	Districts	Nov 6, 1866 (Election Day)	6	0	Steady	0	Steady	6	Steady
Minnesota	Districts	Nov 6, 1866 (Election Day)	2	0	Steady	0	Steady	2	Steady
Missouri	Districts	Nov 6, 1866 (Election Day)	9	0	▼1	1	▲1	8	Steady
Nevada	At-large	Nov 6, 1866 (Election Day)	1	0	Steady	0	Steady	1	Steady
New Jersey	Districts	Nov 6, 1866 (Election Day)	5	2	▼1	0	Steady	3	▲1
New York	Districts	Nov 6, 1866 (Election Day)	31	10	▼1	1	▲1	20	Steady
Wisconsin	Districts	Nov 6, 1866 (Election Day)	6	1	Steady	0	Steady	5	Steady
Late elections (after the March 4, 1867, beginning of Congress)
New Hampshire	Districts	Mar 12, 1867	3	0	Steady	0	Steady	3	Steady
Connecticut	Districts	Apr 1, 1867	4	3	▲3	0	Steady	1	▼3
Rhode Island	Districts	Apr 3, 1867	2	0	Steady	0	Steady	2	Steady
Kentucky	Districts	May 4, 1867	9 (Note: One seat remained vacant during the 40th Congress.)	7	▲7	0	▼5	1 (Note: Not seated until June 22, 1868.)	▼3
Tennessee	Districts	Aug 3, 1867	8	0	Steady	0	▼4	8	▲4
California	Districts	Sep 6, 1867	3	2	▲2	0	Steady	1	▼2
States not yet readmitted
Alabama	Districts	—	6	0	Steady	0	Steady	0	Steady
Arkansas	Districts	August 6, 1866	3	0	Steady	0	Steady	0	Steady
Florida	At-large	—	1	0	Steady	0	Steady	0	Steady
Georgia	Districts	—	7	0	Steady	0	Steady	0	Steady
Louisiana	Districts	—	5	0	Steady	0	Steady	0	Steady
Mississippi	Districts	—	5	0	Steady	0	Steady	0	Steady
North Carolina	Districts	—	7	0	Steady	0	Steady	0	Steady
South Carolina	Districts	—	4	0	Steady	0	Steady	0	Steady
Texas	Districts	October 15, 1866	4	0	Steady	0	Steady	0	Steady
Virginia	Districts	—	8	0	Steady	0	Steady	0	Steady
Total			193	45 24.4%	▲10	2 1.0%	▼7	145 74.6%	▼3

Popular vote
Republican	55.36%
Democratic	40.69%
Conservative	2.00%
Independent	1.76%
Others	0.19%

House seats
Republican	74.61%
Democratic	23.31%
Conservative	1.03%
Independent Republican	0.52%
Vacancy	0.52%

=== Maps ===
Winner's share of the popular vote

Late and special elections held in 1866

Seats elected in 1866

Seats elected in 1867

Special elections held in 1867

== Special elections ==
=== 39th Congress ===
District	Incumbent			This race	
District	Member	Party	First elected	Results	Candidates
Kentucky 5	Lovell Rousseau	Unconditional; Union	1865	Incumbent resigned July 21, 1866, following his assault on Josiah B. Grinnell. Incumbent re-elected September 15, 1866. Unconditional Union hold.	▌ ✓ Lovell Rousseau (Unconditional Union) 99.01%; Scattering 0.99%
Kentucky 6	Green C. Smith	Unconditional; Union	1863	Incumbent resigned July 13, 1866. New member elected September 15, 1866. Democratic gain.	▌ ✓ Andrew H. Ward (Democratic) 89.21%; ▌R. R. Carpenter (Unknown) 10.79%
Kentucky 3	Henry Grider	Conservative	1861 (Note: Grider was elected as a Union Democrat in 1861 and re-elected as a Conservative in 1865.)	Incumbent died September 7, 1866. New member elected October 6, 1866. Democratic gain.	▌ ✓ Elijah Hise (Democratic) 74.32%; ▌P. B. Hawkins (Unconditional Union) 25.68%
New York 3	James Humphrey	Union	1864	Incumbent died June 16, 1866. New member elected November 6, 1866. Democratic gain.	▌ ✓ John W. Hunter (Democratic) 54.38%; ▌Simeon B. Chittenden (Republican) 45.62%

=== 40th Congress ===
District	Incumbent			This race	
District	Member	Party	First elected	Results	Candidates
Kentucky 3	Elijah Hise	Democratic	1866 (special)	Incumbent died May 6, 1867. New member elected August 5, 1867. Democratic hold.	▌ ✓ Jacob Golladay (Democratic) 76.57%; ▌J. R. Curd (Republican) 13.59%; ▌W. T. Jackman (Independent) 9.83%
Ohio 2	Rutherford B. Hayes	Republican	1864	Incumbent resigned July 20, 1867. New member elected October 8, 1867. Independent gain.	▌ ✓ Samuel F. Cary (Independent) 52.10%; ▌Richard Smith (Republican) 47.29%; ▌Charles Reemelin (Democratic) 0.60%
Pennsylvania 12	Charles Denison	Democratic	1862	Incumbent died June 27, 1867. New member elected October 8, 1867. Democratic hold.	▌ ✓ George W. Woodward (Democratic) 51.20%; ▌Winthrop W. Ketcham (Republican) 48.80%
Missouri 3	Thomas E. Noell	Conservative	1864 (Note: Noell was elected as a Radical in 1864 and re-elected as a Conservative in 1866.)	Incumbent died October 3, 1867. New member elected November 5, 1867. Democratic gain.	▌ ✓ James R. McCormick (Democratic) 52.74%; ▌James H. Chase (Radical) 47.26%
New York 21	Roscoe Conkling	Republican	1864	Incumbent resigned March 3, 1867. New member elected November 5, 1867. Republican hold.	▌ ✓ Alexander H. Bailey (Republican) 51.54%; ▌John Stryker (Democratic) 48.47%

== Alabama ==
Alabama did not hold elections until 1868 during Reconstruction.

District	Incumbent			This race	
District	Member	Party	First elected	Results	Candidates
Alabama 1	Vacant			Seat vacant since January 12, 1861. No election.	None.
Alabama 2	Vacant			Seat vacant since January 12, 1861. No election.	None.
Alabama 3	Vacant			Seat vacant since January 12, 1861. No election.	None.
Alabama 4	Vacant			Seat vacant since January 12, 1861. No election.	None.
Alabama 5	Vacant			Seat vacant since January 12, 1861. No election.	None.
Alabama 6	Vacant			Seat vacant since January 12, 1861. No election.	None.

== Arkansas ==
District	Incumbent			This race	
District	Member	Party	First elected	Results	Candidates
Arkansas 1	Vacant			Seat vacant since May 6, 1861. Winner not seated.	▌ ✓ William Byers (Conservative) 79.36%; ▌P. Van Patton (Unknown) 17.22%; ▌T. M. Jacks (Unknown) 3.43%
Arkansas 2	Vacant			Seat vacant since May 6, 1861. Winner not seated.	▌ ✓ A. W. Hobson (Conservative) 54.50%; ▌John H. Askew (Unknown) 39.25%; ▌D. H. Moore (Unknown) 4.07%; Scattering 2.19%
Arkansas 3	Vacant			Seat vacant since May 6, 1861. Winner not seated.	▌ ✓ Albert C. Greenwood (Conservative) 60.74%; ▌James M. Johnson (Union) 30.58%; ▌J. E. Bennett (Unknown) 6.65%; ▌H. B. Stuart (Unknown) 2.04%

== California ==
District	Incumbent			This race	
District	Member	Party	First elected	Results	Candidates
California 1	Donald C. McRuer	Republican	1864	Incumbent retired. Democratic gain.	▌ ✓ Samuel B. Axtell (Democratic) 57.33%; ▌Timothy G. Phelps (Republican) 42.67%
California 2	William Higby	Republican	1863	Incumbent re-elected.	▌ ✓ William Higby (Republican) 52.05%; ▌James W. Coffroth (Democratic) 47.95%
California 3	John Bidwell	Republican	1864	Incumbent retired. Democratic gain.	▌ ✓ James A. Johnson (Democratic) 50.64%; ▌Chancellor Hartson (Republican) 49.36%

== Colorado Territory ==
See non-voting delegates, below.

== Connecticut ==
District	Incumbent			This race	
District	Member	Party	First elected	Results	Candidates
Connecticut 1	Henry C. Deming	Republican	1863	Incumbent lost re-election. Democratic gain.	▌ ✓ Richard D. Hubbard (Democratic) 51.10%; ▌Henry C. Deming (Republican) 48.90%
Connecticut 2	Samuel L. Warner	Republican	1861	Incumbent retired. Democratic gain.	▌ ✓ Julius Hotchkiss (Democratic) 53.24%; ▌Cyrus Northrop (Republican) 46.76%
Connecticut 3	Augustus Brandegee	Republican	1863	Incumbent retired. Republican hold.	▌ ✓ Henry H. Starkweather (Republican) 55.40%; ▌Earl Martin (Democratic) 44.60%
Connecticut 4	John Henry Hubbard	Republican	1863	Incumbent lost renomination. Democratic gain.	▌ ✓ William Barnum (Democratic) 51.95%; ▌P. T. Barnum (Republican) 48.05%

== Dakota Territory ==
See non-voting delegates, below.

== Delaware ==
District	Incumbent			This race	
District	Member	Party	First elected	Results	Candidates
Delaware at-large	John A. Nicholson	Democratic	1864	Incumbent re-elected.	▌ ✓ John A. Nicholson (Democratic) 53.73%; ▌John L. McKim (Republican) 46.27%

== Florida ==
Florida did not hold elections until 1868 during Reconstruction.

District	Incumbent			This race	
District	Member	Party	First elected	Results	Candidates
Florida at-large	Vacant			Seat vacant since January 10, 1861. No election.	None.

== Georgia ==
Georgia did not hold elections until 1868 during Reconstruction.

District	Incumbent			This race	
District	Member	Party	First elected	Results	Candidates
Georgia 1	Vacant			Seat vacant since January 19, 1861. No election.	None.
Georgia 2	Vacant			Seat vacant since January 19, 1861. No election.	None.
Georgia 3	Vacant			Seat vacant since January 19, 1861. No election.	None.
Georgia 4	Vacant			Seat vacant since January 19, 1861. No election.	None.
Georgia 5	Vacant			Seat vacant since January 19, 1861. No election.	None.
Georgia 6	Vacant			Seat vacant since January 19, 1861. No election.	None.
Georgia 7	Vacant			Seat vacant since January 19, 1861. No election.	None.

== Idaho Territory ==
See non-voting delegates, below.

== Illinois ==
District	Incumbent			This race	
District	Member	Party	First elected	Results	Candidates
Illinois at-large	Samuel W. Moulton	Republican	1864	Incumbent retired. Republican hold.	▌ ✓ John A. Logan (Republican) 57.93%; ▌F. Lyle Dickey (Democratic) 42.07%
Illinois 1	John Wentworth	Republican	1864	Incumbent retired. Republican hold.	▌ ✓ Norman B. Judd (Republican) 72.90%; ▌M. R. Wallace (Democratic) 27.10%
Illinois 2	John F. Farnsworth	Republican	1862	Incumbent re-elected.	▌ ✓ John F. Farnsworth (Republican) 82.87%; ▌E. M. Haines (Democratic) 17.13%
Illinois 3	Elihu B. Washburne	Republican	1852	Incumbent re-elected.	▌ ✓ Elihu B. Washburne (Republican) 70.85%; ▌Thomas J. Turner (Democratic) 28.51%; Scattering 0.64%
Illinois 4	Abner C. Harding	Republican	1864	Incumbent re-elected.	▌ ✓ Abner C. Harding (Republican) 54.36%; ▌John S. Thompson (Democratic) 45.64%
Illinois 5	Ebon C. Ingersoll	Republican	1864 (special)	Incumbent retired. Republican hold.	▌ ✓ Ebon C. Ingersoll (Republican) 65.61%; ▌Silas Ramsey (Democratic) 34.39%
Illinois 6	Burton C. Cook	Republican	1864	Incumbent re-elected.	▌ ✓ Burton C. Cook (Republican) 66.04%; ▌S. H. Harris (Democratic) 33.96%
Illinois 7	Henry P. H. Bromwell	Republican	1864	Incumbent re-elected.	▌ ✓ Henry P. H. Bromwell (Republican) 56.74%; ▌Charles Black (Democratic) 43.26%
Illinois 8	Shelby M. Cullom	Republican	1864	Incumbent re-elected.	▌ ✓ Shelby M. Cullom (Republican) 56.19%; ▌Edwin S. Fowler (Democratic) 43.81%
Illinois 9	Lewis Winans Ross	Democratic	1862	Incumbent re-elected.	▌ ✓ Lewis W. Ross (Democratic) 51.28%; ▌Charles E. Lippincott (Republican) 48.72%
Illinois 10	Anthony Thornton	Democratic	1864	Incumbent retired. Democratic hold.	▌ ✓ Albert G. Burr (Democratic) 53.72%; ▌Henry Case (Republican) 46.28%
Illinois 11	Samuel S. Marshall	Democratic	1862	Incumbent re-elected.	▌ ✓ Samuel S. Marshall (Democratic) 53.69%; ▌Edward Kitchell (Democratic) 46.31%
Illinois 12	Jehu Baker	Republican	1864	Incumbent re-elected.	▌ ✓ Jehu Baker (Republican) 52.15%; ▌William R. Morrison (Democratic) 47.85%
Illinois 13	Andrew J. Kuykendall	Republican	1864	Incumbent retired. Republican hold.	▌ ✓ Green B. Raum (Republican) 51.08%; ▌William J. Allen (Democratic) 48.92%

== Indiana ==
District	Incumbent			This race	
District	Member	Party	First elected	Results	Candidates
Indiana 1	William E. Niblack	Democratic	1864	Incumbent re-elected.	▌ ✓ William E. Niblack (Democratic) 52.04%; ▌Lemuel Q. DeBruler (Republican) 47.96%
Indiana 2	Michael C. Kerr	Democratic	1864	Incumbent re-elected.	▌ ✓ William E. Niblack (Democratic) 53.47%; ▌Walter Q. Gresham (Republican) 46.53%
Indiana 3	Ralph Hill	Republican	1864	Incumbent retired. Republican hold.	▌ ✓ Morton C. Hunter (Republican) 52.18%; ▌Henry W. Harrington (Democratic) 48.72%
Indiana 4	John H. Farquhar	Republican	1864	Incumbent retired. Democratic gain.	▌ ✓ William S. Holman (Democratic) 51.89%; ▌Ira G. Grover (Republican) 48.11%
Indiana 5	George W. Julian	Republican	1860	Incumbent re-elected.	▌ ✓ George W. Julian (Republican) 65.11%; ▌Martin L. Bundy (Democratic) 34.89%
Indiana 6	Ebenezer Dumont	Republican	1862	Incumbent retired. Republican hold.	▌ ✓ John Coburn (Republican) 54.14%; ▌John M. Lord (Democratic) 49.12%
Indiana 7	Daniel W. Voorhees	Democratic	1860	Incumbent retired. Republican gain.	▌ ✓ Henry D. Washburn (Republican) 50.88%; ▌Solomon Claypool (Democratic) 49.12%
Indiana 8	Godlove S. Orth	Republican	1862	Incumbent re-elected.	▌ ✓ Godlove S. Orth (Republican) 50.35%; ▌John Purdue (Democratic) 49.65%
Indiana 9	Schuyler Colfax	Republican	1854	Incumbent re-elected	▌ ✓ Schuyler Colfax (Republican) 52.81%; ▌David Turpie (Democratic) 47.19%
Indiana 10	Joseph H. Defrees	Republican	1864	Incumbent retired. Republican hold.	▌ ✓ William Williams (Republican) 51.90%; ▌Robert Lowry (Democratic) 48.10%
Indiana 11	Thomas N. Stilwell	Republican	1864	Incumbent retired. Republican hold.	▌ ✓ John P. C. Shanks (Republican) 54.31%; ▌Barton B. Snow (Democratic) 45.69%

== Iowa ==
District	Incumbent			This race	
District	Member	Party	First elected	Results	Candidates
Iowa 1	James F. Wilson	Republican	1862	Incumbent re-elected.	▌ ✓ James F. Wilson (Republican) 60.94%; ▌Fitz H. Warren (Democratic) 39.06%
Iowa 2	Hiram Price	Republican	1862	Incumbent re-elected.	▌ ✓ Hiram Price (Republican) 63.81%; ▌John P. Cook (Democratic) 36.19%
Iowa 3	William B. Allison	Republican	1862	Incumbent re-elected.	▌ ✓ William B. Allison (Republican) 59.64%; ▌Reuben Noble (Democratic) 40.46%
Iowa 4	Josiah B. Grinnell	Republican	1862	Incumbent retired. Republican hold.	▌ ✓ William Loughridge (Republican) 59.84%; ▌Cyms H. Mackey (Democratic) 40.03%
Iowa 5	John A. Kasson	Republican	1862	Incumbent retired. Republican hold.	▌ ✓ Grenville M. Dodge (Republican) 58.99%; ▌James M. Tuttle (Democratic) 41.01%
Iowa 6	Asahel W. Hubbard	Republican	1862	Incumbent re-elected.	▌ ✓ Asahel W. Hubbard (Republican) 69.98%; ▌J. D. Thompson (Democratic) 27.61%; ▌G. M. Woodbury (Unknown) 2.41%

== Kansas ==
District	Incumbent			This race	
District	Member	Party	First elected	Results	Candidates
Kansas at-large	Sidney Clarke	Republican	1864	Incumbent re-elected.	▌ ✓ Sidney Clarke (Republican) 70.06%; ▌C. W. Blair (National Union) 29.94%

== Kentucky ==
District	Incumbent			This race	
District	Member	Party	First elected	Results	Candidates
Kentucky 1	Lawrence S. Trimble	Conservative	1865	Incumbent re-elected as a Democrat. Democratic gain.	▌ ✓ Lawrence S. Trimble (Democratic) 84.61%; ▌George G. Symes (Republican) 15.39%
Kentucky 2	Burwell C. Ritter	Conservative	1865	Incumbent lost re-election. Winner not seated. Conservative loss.	▌John Y. Brown (Democratic) 69.20%; ▌Samuel E. Smith (Republican) 21.84%; ▌Burwell C. Ritter (Conservative) 8.96%
Kentucky 3	Elijah Hise	Democratic	1866 (special)	Incumbent re-elected.	▌ ✓ Elijah Hise (Democratic) 86.59%; ▌George D. Blakey (Republican) 13.41%
Kentucky 4	Aaron Harding	Conservative	1861 (Note: Harding was elected as a Union Democrat in 1861 and re-elected as a Conservative in 1865.)	Incumbent retired. Democratic gain.	▌ ✓ J. Proctor Knott (Democratic) 74.64%; ▌Mason C. Taylor (Republican) 20.73%; ▌William J. Heady (Conservative) 4.62%
Kentucky 5	Lovell Rousseau	Conservative	1865 (Note: Rousseau was elected as an Unconditional Unionist in 1865 and became a Conservative during the 39th Congress.)	Incumbent retired. Democratic gain.	▌ ✓ Asa Grover (Democratic) 69.26%; ▌R. J. Jacobs (Conservative) 23.52%; ▌William A. Bulitt (Republican) 7.22%
Kentucky 6	Andrew H. Ward	Democratic	1866 (special)	Incumbent retired. Democratic hold.	▌ ✓ Thomas L. Jones (Democratic) 72.57%; ▌W. L. Rankin (Republican) 27.43%
Kentucky 7	George S. Shanklin	Conservative	1865	Incumbent retired. Democratic gain.	▌ ✓ James B. Beck (Democratic) 76.10%; ▌William Brown (Republican) 13.03%; ▌Charles Hanson (Conservative) 10.87%
Kentucky 8	William H. Randall	Republican	1863 (Note: Randall was elected as a Union Democrat in August 1863 and became a Unconditional Unionist in December 1863. The Unconditional Union Party reorganized as the Kentucky Republican Party in 1867.)	Incumbent retired. Democratic gain.	▌ ✓ George M. Adams (Democratic) 51.23%; ▌Milton L. Rice (Republican) 48.77%
Kentucky 9	Samuel McKee	Republican	1865 (Note: McKee was elected as an Unconditional Unionist. The Unconditional Union Party reorganized as the Kentucky Republican Party in 1867.)	Incumbent successfully challenged result. Republican hold.	▌John D. Young (Democratic) 51.47%; ▌Samuel McKee (Republican) 43.05%; ▌Thomas M. Green (Conservative) 5.48%

== Louisiana ==
Louisiana did not hold elections until 1868 during Reconstruction.

District	Incumbent			This race	
District	Member	Party	First elected	Results	Candidates
Louisiana 1	Vacant			Seat vacant since March 4, 1863. No election.	None.
Louisiana 2	Vacant			Seat vacant since March 4, 1863. No election.	None.
Louisiana 3	Vacant			Seat vacant since January 26, 1861. No election.	None.
Louisiana 4	Vacant			Seat vacant since January 26, 1861. No election.	None.
Louisiana 5	Vacant			Seat vacant since January 26, 1861. No election.	None.

== Maine ==
District	Incumbent			This race	
District	Member	Party	First elected	Results	Candidates
Maine 1	John Lynch	Republican	1864	Incumbent re-elected.	▌ ✓ John Lynch (Republican) 57.26%; ▌Lorenzo D. Sweat (Democratic) 42.74%
Maine 2	Sidney Perham	Republican	1860	Incumbent re-elected.	▌ ✓ Sidney Perham (Republican) 65.34%; ▌Nahum Morrill (Democratic) 34.66%
Maine 3	James G. Blaine	Republican	1860	Incumbent re-elected.	▌ ✓ James G. Blaine (Republican) 64.13%; ▌Solyman Heath (Democratic) 35.87%
Maine 4	John H. Rice	Republican	1856	Incumbent retired. Republican hold.	▌ ✓ John A. Peters (Republican) 64.47%; ▌George M. Weston (Democratic) 35.53%
Maine 5	Frederick A. Pike	Republican	1860	Incumbent re-elected.	▌ ✓ Frederick A. Pike (Republican) 61.51%; ▌William G. Crosby (Democratic) 38.49%

== Maryland ==
District	Incumbent			This race	
District	Member	Party	First elected	Results	Candidates (Note: Dubin lists the Unconditional Union candidates as Republicans; however, Maryland's Union Party did not change its name to the Maryland Republican Party until April 1867, after these elections.)
Maryland 1	Hiram McCullough	Democratic	1864	Incumbent re-elected.	▌ ✓ Hiram McCullough (Democratic) 74.22%; ▌George M. Russum (Unconditional Union) 25.64%; ▌Robert B. Goodyear (Unknown) 0.14%
Maryland 2	John Lewis Thomas Jr.	Unconditional; Union	1865 (special)	Incumbent lost re-election. Democratic gain.	▌ ✓ Stevenson Archer (Democratic) 58.58%; ▌John L. Thomas (Unconditional Union) 41.42%
Maryland 3	Charles E. Phelps	Conservative	1864	Incumbent re-elected as a Democrat. Democratic gain.	▌ ✓ Charles E. Phelps (Democratic) 54.83%; ▌James J. Stewart (Unconditional Union) 41.42%
Maryland 4	Francis Thomas	Unconditional; Union	1861	Incumbent re-elected.	▌ ✓ Francis Thomas (Unconditional Union) 52.62%; ▌William Omauleby (Democratic) 47.38%
Maryland 5	Benjamin G. Harris	Democratic	1864	Incumbent retired. Democratic hold.	▌ ✓ Frederick Stone (Democratic) 81.08%; ▌William Albert (Unconditional Union) 18.92%

== Massachusetts ==
District	Incumbent			This race	
District	Member	Party	First elected	Results	Candidates
Massachusetts 1	Thomas D. Eliot	Republican	1858	Incumbent re-elected.	▌ ✓ Thomas D. Eliot (Republican) 84.17%; ▌Matthias Elias (Democratic) 15.83%
Massachusetts 2	Oakes Ames	Republican	1862	Incumbent re-elected.	▌ ✓ Oakes Ames (Republican) 79.60%; ▌Abijah M. Ide (Democratic) 20.40%
Massachusetts 3	Alexander H. Rice	Republican	1858	Incumbent retired. Republican hold.	▌ ✓ Ginery Twichell (Republican) 66.51%; ▌William Henry Aspinwall (Democratic) 28.43%; ▌P. R. Quincy (Workingman) 5.06%
Massachusetts 4	Samuel Hooper	Republican	1861 (special)	Incumbent re-elected.	▌ ✓ Samuel Hooper (Republican) 71.29%; ▌Joseph M. Wightman (Democratic) 28.71%
Massachusetts 5	John B. Alley	Republican	1858	Incumbent retired. Republican hold.	▌ ✓ Benjamin Butler (Republican) 76.07%; ▌William D. Northend (Democratic) 23.93%
Massachusetts 6	Nathaniel P. Banks	Republican	1865 (special)	Incumbent re-elected.	▌ ✓ Nathaniel P. Banks (Republican) 74.96%; ▌Frederick O. Prince (Democratic) 25.04%
Massachusetts 7	George S. Boutwell	Republican	1862	Incumbent re-elected.	▌ ✓ George S. Boutwell (Republican) 77.34%; ▌Leverett Saltonstall (Democratic) 22.66%
Massachusetts 8	John D. Baldwin	Republican	1862	Incumbent re-elected.	▌ ✓ John D. Baldwin (Republican) 82.62%; ▌William A. Williams (Democratic) 17.38%
Massachusetts 9	William B. Washburn	Republican	1862	Incumbent re-elected.	▌ ✓ William B. Washburn (Republican) 87.06%; ▌Levi Haywood (Democratic) 12.94%
Massachusetts 10	Henry L. Dawes	Republican	1856	Incumbent re-elected.	▌ ✓ Henry L. Dawes (Republican) 66.00%; ▌Abijah W. Chapin (Democratic) 34.00%

== Michigan ==
District	Incumbent			This race	
District	Member	Party	First elected	Results	Candidates
Michigan 1	Fernando C. Beaman	Republican	1860	Incumbent re-elected.	▌ ✓ Fernando C. Beaman (Republican) 56.30%; ▌J. Logan Chipman (Democratic) 43.70%
Michigan 2	Charles Upson	Republican	1862	Incumbent re-elected.	▌ ✓ Charles Upson (Republican) 63.61%; ▌Henry F. Severens (Democratic) 36.39%
Michigan 3	John W. Longyear	Republican	1862	Incumbent retired. Republican hold.	▌ ✓ Austin Blair (Republican) 56.93%; ▌Bradley F. Granger (Democratic) 43.07%
Michigan 4	Thomas W. Ferry	Republican	1864	Incumbent re-elected.	▌ ✓ Thomas W. Ferry (Republican) 65.24%; ▌John B. Hutchins (Democratic) 34.76%
Michigan 6	Rowland E. Trowbridge	Republican	1864	Incumbent re-elected.	▌ ✓ Rowland E. Trowbridge (Republican) 54.63%; ▌William L. Bancroft (Democratic) 45.37%
Michigan 7	John F. Driggs	Republican	1862	Incumbent re-elected.	▌ ✓ John F. Driggs (Republican) 57.80%; ▌Julius K. Rose (Democratic) 42.20%

== Minnesota ==
District	Incumbent			This race	
District	Member	Party	First elected	Results	Candidates
Minnesota 1	William Windom	Republican	1859	Incumbent re-elected.	▌ ✓ William Windom (Republican) 51.84%; ▌Richard A. Jones (Democratic) 48.16%
Minnesota 2	Ignatius L. Donnelly	Republican	1862	Incumbent re-elected.	▌ ✓ Ignatius L. Donnelly (Republican) 60.79%; ▌William J. Colvill (Democratic) 39.21%

== Mississippi ==
Mississippi did not hold elections until 1868 during Reconstruction.

District	Incumbent			This race	
District	Member	Party	First elected	Results	Candidates
Mississippi 1	Vacant			Seat vacant since January 9, 1861. No election.	None.
Mississippi 2	Vacant			Seat vacant since January 9, 1861. No election.	None.
Mississippi 3	Vacant			Seat vacant since January 9, 1861. No election.	None.
Mississippi 4	Vacant			Seat vacant since January 9, 1861. No election.	None.
Mississippi 5	Vacant			Seat vacant since January 9, 1861. No election.	None.

== Missouri ==
District	Incumbent			This race	
District	Member	Party	First elected	Results	Candidates
Missouri 1	John Hogan	Democratic	1864	Incumbent lost re-election as a Conservative. Radical gain.	▌ ✓ William A. Pile (Radical) 50.82%; ▌John Hogan (Conservative) 49.18%
Missouri 2	Henry T. Blow	Radical	1862	Incumbent retired. Radical hold.	▌ ✓ Carman Newcomb (Radical) 59.05%; ▌William V. Bay (Conservative) 40.95%
Missouri 3	Thomas E. Noell	Conservative	1864 (Note: Noell was elected as a Radical in 1864 and became a Conservative during the 39th Congress.)	Incumbent re-elected.	▌ ✓ Thomas E. Noell (Conservative) 56.49%; ▌Albert Jackson (Radical) 43.51%
Missouri 4	John R. Kelso	Independent; Union	1864	Incumbent retired. Radical gain.	▌ ✓ Joseph J. Gravely (Radical) 75.92%; ▌John S. Waddill (Conservative) 24.08%
Missouri 5	Joseph W. McClurg	Radical	1862	Incumbent re-elected.	▌ ✓ Joseph W. McClurg (Radical) 65.10%; ▌Thomas L. Price (Conservative) 34.90%
Missouri 6	Robert T. Van Horn	Radical	1864	Incumbent re-elected.	▌ ✓ Robert T. Van Horn (Radical) 52.56%; ▌James H. Birgh (Conservative) 47.36%; ▌L. S. McCoy (Unknown) 0.08%
Missouri 7	Benjamin F. Loan	Radical	1862	Incumbent re-elected	▌ ✓ Benjamin F. Loan (Radical) 73.33%; ▌George A. Hawley (Conservative) 26.67%
Missouri 8	John F. Benjamin	Radical	1864	Incumbent re-elected.	▌ ✓ John F. Benjamin (Radical) 55.60%; ▌John M. Glover (Conservative) 44.40%
Missouri 9	George W. Anderson	Radical	1864	Incumbent re-elected.	▌ ✓ George W. Anderson (Radical) 50.93%; ▌William F. Switzler (Conservative) 49.07%

== Montana Territory ==
See non-voting delegates, below.

== Nebraska ==
Nevada held successive elections in 1866 to fill one vacancy in the 38th Congress and elect its representative to the 39th Congress.

=== 39th Congress ===
District	Incumbent			This race	
District	Member	Party	First elected	Results	Candidates
Nebraska at-large	New state			New seat. Republican gain.	▌ ✓ Turner M. Marquett (Republican) 50.84%; ▌John R. Brooke (Democratic) 49.16%

=== 40th Congress ===
District	Incumbent			This race	
District	Member	Party	First elected	Results	Candidates
Nebraska at-large	Turner M. Marquett	Republican	1866	Incumbent retired. Republican hold.	▌ ✓ John Taffe (Republican) 54.02%; ▌Algernon Paddock (Democratic) 45.64%; ▌George F. Train (Unknown) 0.34%

== Nevada ==
District	Incumbent			This race	
District	Member	Party	First elected	Results	Candidates
Nevada at-large	Delos R. Ashley	Republican	1865	Incumbent re-elected.	▌ ✓ Delos R. Ashley (Republican) 54.60%; ▌H. K. Mitchell (Democratic) 45.40%

== New Hampshire ==
District	Incumbent			This race	
District	Member	Party	First elected	Results	Candidates
New Hampshire 1	Gilman Marston	Republican	1865	Incumbent retired. Republican hold.	▌ ✓ Jacob H. Ela (Republican) 51.95%; ▌Daniel Marcy (Democratic) 48.05%
New Hampshire 2	Edward H. Rollins	Republican	1861	Incumbent retired. Republican hold.	▌ ✓ Aaron F. Stevens (Republican) 52.21%; ▌Edward W. Harrington (Democratic) 47.79%
New Hampshire 3	James W. Patterson	Republican	1863	Incumbent retired. Republican hold.	▌ ✓ Jacob Benton (Republican) 52.43%; ▌Harry Bingham (Democratic) 47.57%

== New Jersey ==
District	Incumbent			This race	
District	Member	Party	First elected	Results	Candidates
New Jersey 1	John F. Starr	Republican	1862	Incumbent retired. Republican hold.	▌ ✓ William Moore (Republican) 57.78%; ▌Albert H. Slape (Democratic) 42.22%
New Jersey 2	William A. Newell	Republican	1864	Incumbent lost re-election. Democratic gain.	▌ ✓ Charles Haight (Democratic) 50.64%; ▌William A. Newell (Republican) 49.36%
New Jersey 3	Charles Sitgreaves	Democratic	1864	Incumbent re-elected.	▌ ✓ Charles Sitgreaves (Democratic) 54.90%; ▌John Davidson (Republican) 45.10%
New Jersey 4	Andrew J. Rogers	Democratic	1862	Incumbent retired. Republican gain.	▌ ✓ John Hill (Republican) 50.70%; ▌Andrew J. Rogers (Democratic) 48.49%; ▌John Huyler (Independent) 0.71%
New Jersey 5	Edwin R. V. Wright	Democratic	1864	Incumbent lost re-election. Republican gain.	▌ ✓ George A. Halsey (Republican) 51.92%; ▌Robert Gilchrist Jr. (Democratic) 48.08%

== New Mexico Territory ==
See non-voting delegates, below.

== New York ==
District	Incumbent			This race	
District	Member	Party	First elected	Results	Candidates
New York 1	Stephen Taber	Democratic	1864	Incumbent re-elected.	▌ ✓ Stephen Taber (Democratic) 52.76%; ▌William H. Gleason (Republican) 47.24%
New York 2	Teunis G. Bergen	Democratic	1864	Incumbent retired. Democratic hold.	▌ ✓ Demas Barnes (Democratic) 62.50%; ▌James A. Van Brunt (Republican) 35.96%
New York 3	Vacant (Note: The incumbent Republican James Humphrey died prior to the election.)			Incumbent died June 16, 1866. Democratic gain.	▌ ✓ William E. Robinson (Democratic) 52.76%; ▌Simeon B. Chittenden (Republican) 46.09%
New York 4	Morgan Jones	Democratic	1864	Incumbent retired. Democratic hold.	▌ ✓ John Fox (Democratic) 78.91%; ▌Horace Greeley (Republican) 21.09%
New York 5	Nelson Taylor	Democratic	1864	Incumbent lost re-election as an Independent Democrat. Democratic hold.	▌ ✓ John Morrissey (Democratic) 51.02%; ▌Nelson Taylor (Independent Democratic) 36.21%; ▌Eneas Elliott (Republican) 12.77%
New York 6	Henry J. Raymond	Conservative	1864	Incumbent retired. Conservative hold.	▌ ✓ Thomas E. Stewart (C; D) 55.22%; ▌Charles S. Spencer (Republican) 40.63%; ▌George Stevenson (Independent Democratic) 4.15%
New York 7	John Winthrop Chanler	Democratic	1862	Incumbent re-elected.	▌ ✓ John W. Chanler (Democratic) 63.04%; ▌George F. Steinbrenner (Republican) 36.96%
New York 8	James Brooks	Democratic	1862	Incumbent re-elected.	▌ ✓ James Brooks (Democratic) 63.32%; ▌LeGrand Cannon (Republican) 36.57%; ▌Elizabeth Cady Stanton (Independent) 0.11%
New York 9	William A. Darling	Republican	1864	Incumbent lost re-election. Democratic gain.	▌ ✓ Fernando Wood (Democratic) 54.57%; ▌William A. Darling (Republican) 45.43%
New York 10	William Radford	Democratic	1862	Incumbent lost re-election. Republican gain.	▌ ✓ William H. Robertson (Republican) 54.68%; ▌William Radford (Democratic) 45.32%
New York 11	Charles H. Winfield	Democratic	1862	Incumbent retired. Republican gain.	▌ ✓ Charles Van Wyck (Republican) 50.65%; ▌Isaac Anderson (Democratic) 49.35%
New York 12	John H. Ketcham	Republican	1864	Incumbent re-elected.	▌ ✓ John H. Ketcham (Republican) 53.63%; ▌Casper P. Collier (Democratic) 46.37%
New York 13	Edwin N. Hubbell	Republican	1864	Incumbent retired. Republican hold.	▌ ✓ Thomas Cornell (Republican) 50.83%; ▌Joseph H. Tuthill (Democratic) 49.17%
New York 14	Charles Goodyear	Democratic	1864	Incumbent retired. Democratic hold.	▌ ✓ John V. L. Pruyn (Democratic) 51.06%; ▌Joseph H. Ramsey (Republican) 48.94%
New York 15	John Augustus Griswold	Republican	1862 (Note: Griswold was elected as a Democrati in 1862 and re-elected as a Republican (Unionist) in 1864.)	Incumbent re-elected.	▌ ✓ John A. Griswold (Republican) 60.20%; ▌Nathaniel B. Milliman (Democratic) 39.80%
New York 16	Orlando Kellogg	Republican	1862	Incumbent retired. Republican hold.	▌ ✓ Orange Ferriss (Republican) 55.76%; ▌George V. Hoyle (Democratic) 44.24%
New York 17	Calvin T. Hulburd	Republican	1862	Incumbent re-elected.	▌ ✓ Calvin T. Hulburd (Republican) 72.44%; ▌Darius W. Lawrence (Democratic) 27.56%
New York 18	James M. Marvin	Republican	1862	Incumbent re-elected.	▌ ✓ James M. Marvin (Republican) 55.66%; ▌Thomas R. Horton (Democratic) 44.34%
New York 19	Demas Hubbard Jr.	Republican	1864	Incumbent retired. Republican hold.	▌ ✓ William C. Fields (Republican) 55.92%; ▌Stephen C. Johnson (Democratic) 44.08%
New York 20	Addison H. Laflin	Republican	1864	Incumbent re-elected.	▌ ✓ Addison H. Laflin (Republican) 58.44%; ▌Edward S. Lansing (Democratic) 41.56%
New York 21	Roscoe Conkling	Republican	1864	Incumbent re-elected.	▌ ✓ Roscoe Conkling (Republican) 53.01%; ▌Palmer V. Kellogg (Democratic) 46.99%
New York 22	Sidney T. Holmes	Republican	1864	Incumbent retired. Republican hold.	▌ ✓ John C. Churchill (Republican) 62.10%; ▌Albertus Perry (Democratic) 37.90%
New York 23	Thomas Treadwell Davis	Republican	1862	Incumbent retired. Republican hold.	▌ ✓ Dennis McCarthy (Republican) 60.49%; ▌William C. Ruger (Democratic) 39.51%
New York 24	Theodore M. Pomeroy	Republican	1860	Incumbent re-elected.	▌ ✓ Theodore M. Pomeroy (Republican) 58.67%; ▌George Humphreys (Democratic) 41.33%
New York 25	Daniel Morris	Republican	1862	Incumbent retired. Republican hold.	▌ ✓ William H. Kelsey (Republican) 60.26%; ▌Henry O. Chesebro (Democratic) 39.74%
New York 26	Giles W. Hotchkiss	Republican	1862	Incumbent retired. Republican hold.	▌ ✓ William S. Lincoln (Republican) 59.99%; ▌Henry McCormick (Democratic) 40.01%
New York 27	Hamilton Ward Sr.	Republican	1864	Incumbent re-elected.	▌ ✓ Hamilton Ward Sr. (Republican) 60.82%; ▌John G. Collins (Democratic) 39.18%
New York 28	Roswell Hart	Republican	1864	Incumbent lost re-election. Independent Republican gain.	▌ ✓ Lewis Selye (Independent Republican) 54.32%; ▌Roswell Hart (Republican) 45.68%
New York 29	Burt Van Horn	Republican	1864	Incumbent re-elected.	▌ ✓ Burt Van Horn (Republican) 57.20%; ▌Harlow L. Comstock (Democratic) 42.80%
New York 30	James M. Humphrey	Democratic	1864	Incumbent re-elected.	▌ ✓ James M. Humphrey (Democratic) 52.58%; ▌Almon M. Clapp (Republican) 47.42%
New York 31	Henry Van Aernam	Republican	1864	Incumbent re-elected.	▌ ✓ Henry Van Aernam (Republican) 66.37%; ▌Hanson A. Risley (Democratic) 33.63%

== North Carolina ==
North Carolina did not hold elections until 1868 during Reconstruction.

District	Incumbent			This race	
District	Member	Party	First elected	Results	Candidates
North Carolina 1	Vacant			Seat vacant since May 20, 1861. No election.	None.
North Carolina 2	Vacant			Seat vacant since May 20, 1861. No election.	None.
North Carolina 3	Vacant			Seat vacant since May 20, 1861. No election.	None.
North Carolina 4	Vacant			Seat vacant since May 20, 1861. No election.	None.
North Carolina 5	Vacant			Seat vacant since May 20, 1861. No election.	None.
North Carolina 6	Vacant			Seat vacant since May 20, 1861. No election.	None.
North Carolina 7	Vacant			Seat vacant since May 20, 1861. No election.	None.

== Ohio ==
District	Incumbent			This race	
District	Member	Party	First elected	Results	Candidates
Ohio 1	Benjamin Eggleston	Republican	1864	Incumbent re-elected.	▌ ✓ Benjamin Eggleston (Republican) 52.32%; ▌George H. Pendleton (Democratic) 47.68%
Ohio 2	Rutherford B. Hayes	Republican	1864	Incumbent re-elected.	▌ ✓ Rutherford B. Hayes (Republican) 56.23%; ▌Theodore Cook (Democratic) 43.77%
Ohio 3	Robert C. Schenck	Republican	1862	Incumbent re-elected.	▌ ✓ Robert C. Schenck (Republican) 51.84%; ▌Durbin Ward (Democratic) 48.16%
Ohio 4	William Lawrence	Republican	1864	Incumbent re-elected.	▌ ✓ William Lawrence (Republican) 54.62%; ▌John F. McKinney (Democratic) 45.38%
Ohio 5	Francis C. Le Blond	Democratic	1862	Incumbent retired. Democratic hold.	▌ ✓ William Mungen (Democratic) 55.44%; ▌Moses B. Walker (Republican) 44.56%
Ohio 6	Reader W. Clarke	Republican	1864	Incumbent re-elected.	▌ ✓ Reader W. Clarke (Republican) 53.02%; ▌William Howard (Democratic) 46.98%
Ohio 7	Samuel Shellabarger	Republican	1864	Incumbent re-elected.	▌ ✓ Samuel Shellabarger (Republican) 54.31%; ▌Thomas Miller (Democratic) 45.69%
Ohio 8	James Randolph Hubbell	Republican	1864	Incumbent retired. Republican hold.	▌ ✓ Cornelius S. Hamilton (Republican) 54.29%; ▌William P. Reid (Democratic) 45.71%
Ohio 9	Ralph P. Buckland	Republican	1864	Incumbent re-elected.	▌ ✓ Ralph P. Buckland (Republican) 52.21%; ▌Thomas P. Finefrock (Democratic) 47.79%
Ohio 10	James M. Ashley	Republican	1862	Incumbent re-elected.	▌ ✓ James M. Ashley (Republican) 53.44%; ▌Henry S. Commager (Democratic) 46.56%
Ohio 11	Hezekiah S. Bundy	Republican	1864	Incumbent retired. Republican hold.	▌ ✓ John T. Wilson (Republican) 56.24%; ▌Oscar F. Moore (Democratic) 43.76%
Ohio 12	William E. Finck	Democratic	1862	Incumbent retired. Democratic hold.	▌ ✓ Philadelph Van Trump (Democratic) 56.20%; ▌Wells S. Jones (Republican) 43.80%
Ohio 13	Columbus Delano	Republican	1864	Incumbent lost re-election. Democratic gain.	▌ ✓ George W. Morgan (Democratic) 50.52%; ▌Columbus Delano (Republican) 49.48%
Ohio 14	Martin Welker	Republican	1864	Incumbent re-elected.	▌ ✓ Martin Welker (Republican) 53.38%; ▌James B. Young (Democratic) 46.62%
Ohio 15	Tobias A. Plants	Republican	1864	Incumbent re-elected.	▌ ✓ Tobias A. Plants (Republican) 54.38%; ▌Martin Dewey Follett (Democratic) 45.62%
Ohio 16	John Bingham	Republican	1864	Incumbent re-elected.	▌ ✓ John Bingham (Republican) 52.81%; ▌Charles H. Mitchner (Democratic) 47.19%
Ohio 17	Ephraim R. Eckley	Republican	1862	Incumbent re-elected.	▌ ✓ Ephraim R. Eckley (Republican) 60.01%; ▌Louis Schaefer (Democratic) 39.99%
Ohio 18	Rufus P. Spalding	Republican	1862	Incumbent re-elected.	▌ ✓ Rufus P. Spalding (Republican) 64.49%; ▌Oliver Payne (Democratic) 35.51%
Ohio 19	James A. Garfield	Republican	1862	Incumbent re-elected.	▌ ✓ James A. Garfield (Republican) 71.34%; ▌David C. Coolman (Democratic) 28.66%

== Oregon ==
District	Incumbent			This race	
District	Member	Party	First elected	Results	Candidates
Oregon at-large	James Henry Dickey Henderson	Republican	1864	Incumbent retired. Republican hold.	▌ ✓ Rufus Mallory (Republican) 51.37%; ▌James D. Fay (Democratic) 48.63%

== Pennsylvania ==
District	Incumbent			This race	
District	Member	Party	First elected	Results	Candidates
Pennsylvania 1	Samuel J. Randall	Democratic	1862	Incumbent re-elected.	▌ ✓ Samuel J. Randall (Democratic) 61.20%; ▌Charles Gibbons (Republican) 38.80%
Pennsylvania 2	Charles O'Neill	Republican	1862	Incumbent re-elected.	▌ ✓ Charles O'Neill (Republican) 57.10%; ▌John Hulme (Democratic) 42.90%
Pennsylvania 3	Leonard Myers	Republican	1862	Incumbent re-elected.	▌ ✓ Leonard Myers (Republican) 52.09%; ▌Charles Buckwalter (Democratic) 47.91%
Pennsylvania 4	William D. Kelley	Republican	1860	Incumbent re-elected.	▌ ✓ William D. Kelley (Republican) 54.55%; ▌John Welsh (Democratic) 45.45%
Pennsylvania 5	Martin Russell Thayer	Republican	1862	Incumbent retired. Republican hold.	▌ ✓ Caleb N. Taylor (Republican) 50.95%; ▌Henry P. Ross (Democratic) 49.05%
Pennsylvania 6	Benjamin Markley Boyer	Democratic	1864	Incumbent re-elected.	▌ ✓ Benjamin Markley Boyer (Democratic) 55.03%; ▌David Thomas (Republican) 44.97%
Pennsylvania 7	John M. Broomall	Republican	1862	Incumbent re-elected.	▌ ✓ John M. Broomall (Republican) 58.47%; ▌Nathaniel Pratt (Democratic) 41.53%
Pennsylvania 8	Sydenham E. Ancona	Democratic	1860	Incumbent retired. Democratic hold.	▌ ✓ J. Lawrence Getz (Democratic) 65.33%; ▌David J. Lincoln (Republican) 34.67%
Pennsylvania 9	Thaddeus Stevens	Republican	1858	Incumbent re-elected.	▌ ✓ Thaddeus Stevens (Republican) 62.24%; ▌Samuel H. Reynolds (D, C) 37.76%
Pennsylvania 10	Myer Strouse	Democratic	1862	Incumbent retired. Republican gain.	▌ ✓ Henry L. Cake (Republican) 50.41%; ▌Cyrus D. Gloninger (Democratic) 49.59%
Pennsylvania 11	Philip Johnson	Democratic	1860	Incumbent retired. Democratic hold.	▌ ✓ Daniel M. Van Auken (Democratic) 63.56%; ▌William Lilly (Republican) 36.44%
Pennsylvania 12	Charles Denison	Democratic	1862	Incumbent re-elected.	▌ ✓ Charles Denison (Democratic) 53.51%; ▌James Archibald (Republican) 46.49%
Pennsylvania 13	Ulysses Mercur	Republican	1864	Incumbent re-elected.	▌ ✓ Ulysses Mercur (Republican) 52.85%; ▌William Elwell (Democratic) 47.15%
Pennsylvania 14	George Funston Miller	Republican	1864	Incumbent re-elected.	▌ ✓ George F. Miller (Republican) 52.82%; ▌Thomas Bower (Democratic) 47.18%
Pennsylvania 15	Adam John Glossbrenner	Democratic	1864	Incumbent re-elected.	▌ ✓ Adam J. Glossbrenner (Democratic) 55.90%; ▌Robert M. Anderson (Republican) 45.10%
Pennsylvania 16	William H. Koontz	Republican	1864	Incumbent re-elected.	▌ ✓ William H. Koontz (Republican) 51.18%; ▌J. McDowell Sharp (Democratic) 48.82%
Pennsylvania 17	Abraham Andrews Barker	Republican	1864	Incumbent retired. Republican hold.	▌ ✓ Daniel J. Morrell (Republican) 52.75%; ▌Robert Johnston (Democratic) 47.25%
Pennsylvania 18	Stephen F. Wilson	Republican	1864	Incumbent re-elected.	▌ ✓ Stephen F. Wilson (Republican) 53.73%; ▌Theodore F. Wright (Democratic) 46.27%
Pennsylvania 19	Glenni W. Scofield	Republican	1862	Incumbent re-elected.	▌ ✓ Glenni W. Scofield (Republican) 54.76%; ▌William L. Scott (Democratic) 45.24%
Pennsylvania 20	Charles Vernon Culver	Republican	1864	Incumbent retired. Republican hold.	▌ ✓ Darwin A. Finney (Republican) 51.18%; ▌Alfred B. McCalmont (Democratic) 48.82%
Pennsylvania 21	John L. Dawson	Democratic	1862	Incumbent retired. Republican gain.	▌ ✓ John Covode (Republican) 50.69%; ▌Hugh H. Wier (Democratic) 49.31%
Pennsylvania 22	James K. Moorhead	Republican	1858	Incumbent re-elected.	▌ ✓ James K. Moorhead (Republican) 56.85%; ▌J. Bowman Switzer (Democratic) 43.15%
Pennsylvania 23	Thomas Williams	Republican	1862	Incumbent re-elected.	▌ ✓ Thomas Williams (Republican) 58.64%; ▌Billings G. Childs (Democratic) 41.36%
Pennsylvania 24	George V. Lawrence	Republican	1864	Incumbent re-elected.	▌ ✓ George V. Lawrence (Republican) 53.05%; ▌William Montgomery (Democratic) 46.95%

== Rhode Island ==
District	Incumbent			This race	
District	Member	Party	First elected	Results	Candidates
Rhode Island 1 Eastern district	Thomas Jenckes	Republican	1863	Incumbent re-elected.	▌ ✓ Thomas Jenckes (Republican) 97.71%; Scattering 2.29%
Rhode Island 2 Western district	Nathan F. Dixon II	Republican	1863	Incumbent re-elected.	▌ ✓ Nathan F. Dixon (Republican) 64.33%; ▌William Carder (Democratic) 35.67%

== South Carolina ==
South Carolina did not hold elections until 1868 during Reconstruction.

District	Incumbent			This race	
District	Member	Party	First elected	Results	Candidates
South Carolina 1	Vacant			Seat vacant since December 20, 1860. No election.	None.
South Carolina 2	Vacant			Seat vacant since December 20, 1860. No election.	None.
South Carolina 3	Vacant			Seat vacant since December 20, 1860. No election.	None.
South Carolina 4	Vacant			Seat vacant since December 20, 1860. No election.	None.

== Tennessee ==
District	Incumbent			This race	
District	Member	Party	First elected	Results	Candidates
Tennessee 1	Nathaniel Green Taylor	Conservative	1865	Incumbent retired. Republican gain.	▌ ✓ Roderick R. Butler (Republican) 86.82%; ▌James White (Conservative) 12.85%; ▌James Powell (Republican) 0.33%
Tennessee 2	Horace Maynard	Republican	1865 (Note: Elected as a Radical. The Radical Party reorganized as the Tennessee Republican Party in February 1867.)	Incumbent re-elected.	▌ ✓ Horace Maynard (Republican) 78.82%; ▌John Williams (Conservative) 21.18%
Tennessee 3	William B. Stokes	Republican	1865	Incumbent re-elected.	▌ ✓ William B. Stokes (Republican) 83.25%; ▌Eli G. Fleming (Conservative) 16.75%
Tennessee 4	Edmund Cooper	Conservative	1865	Incumbent lost re-election. Republican gain.	▌ ✓ James Mullins (Republican) 74.58%; ▌Edmund Cooper (Conservative) 25.42%
Tennessee 5	William B. Campbell	Conservative	1865	Incumbent retired. Republican gain.	▌ ✓ John Trimble (Republican) 72.09%; ▌Balie Peyton (Conservative) 24.37%; ▌D. H. Mason (Independent Republican) 3.54%
Tennessee 6	Samuel Mayes Arnell	Republican	1865	Incumbent re-elected.	▌ ✓ Samuel M. Arnell (Republican) 77.79%; ▌Dorsey B. Thomas (Conservative) 22.21%
Tennessee 7	Isaac Roberts Hawkins	Republican	1865	Incumbent re-elected.	▌ ✓ Isaac R. Hawkins (Republican) 83.60%; ▌William P. Coldwell (Conservative) 16.40%
Tennessee 8	John W. Leftwich	Conservative	1865	Incumbent lost re-election. Republican gain.	▌ ✓ David A. Nunn (Republican) 59.41%; ▌John W. Leftwich (Conservative) 40.59%

== Texas ==
Texas held concurrent elections for the 39th and 40th Congresses, but in both cases the winners were not seated by the House.

=== 39th Congress ===
District	Incumbent			This race	
District	Member	Party	First elected	Results	Candidates
Texas 1	Vacant			Seat vacant since February 1, 1861. Winner not seated.	▌ ✓ George W. Chilton (Unknown) 43.24%; ▌I. M. Burroughs (Unknown) 17.77%; ▌I. M. Camp (Unknown) 11.01%; ▌A. B. Norton (Unknown) 10.25%; ▌A. T. Rainey (Unknown) 6.04%; ▌Y. G. Word (Unknown) 5.85%; ▌William B. Ochiltree (Unknown) 3.31%; Scattering 2.51%
Texas 2	Vacant			Seat vacant since February 1, 1861. Winner not seated.	▌ ✓ Benjamin H. Epperson (Unknown) 62.73%; ▌Arnzi Bradshaw (Unknown) 33.53%; ▌Hill (Unknown) 3.18%; Scattering 0.56%
Texas 3	Vacant			Seat vacant since February 1, 1861. Winner not seated.	▌ ✓ A. M. Branch (Unknown) 42.45%; ▌R. A. Mills (Unknown) 28.10%; ▌Bassett (Unknown) 20.38%; ▌Greeley (Unknown) 7.40%; Scattering 1.66%
Texas 4	Vacant			Seat vacant since February 1, 1861. Winner not seated.	▌ ✓ C. C. Herbert (Unknown) 45.90%; ▌I. W. Henderson (Unknown) 23.68%; ▌Finley (Unknown) 19.68%; ▌Darden (Unknown) 8.62%; Scattering 2.12%

=== 40th Congress ===
District	Incumbent			This race	
District	Member	Party	First elected	Results	Candidates
Texas 1	Vacant			Seat vacant since February 1, 1861. Winner not seated.	▌ ✓ I. M. Burroughs (Unknown) 26.57%; ▌I. M. Camp (Unknown) 22.85%; ▌George W. Chilton (Unknown) 17.74%; ▌Y. G. Word (Unknown) 8.85%; ▌William B. Ochiltree (Unknown) 8.57%; ▌A. T. Rainey (Unknown) 8.07%; ▌A. B. Norton (Unknown) 7.34%
Texas 2	Vacant			Seat vacant since February 1, 1861. Winner not seated.	▌ ✓ Benjamin H. Epperson (Unknown) 64.75%; ▌Arnzi Bradshaw (Unknown) 31.18%; ▌Hill (Unknown) 2.93%; Scattering 1.14%
Texas 3	Vacant			Seat vacant since February 1, 1861. Winner not seated.	▌ ✓ A. M. Branch (Unknown) 38.58%; ▌R. A. Mills (Unknown) 28.51%; ▌Bassett (Unknown) 16.22%; ▌Greeley (Unknown) 14.95%; Scattering 1.74%
Texas 4	Vacant			Seat vacant since February 1, 1861. Winner not seated.	▌ ✓ C. C. Herbert (Unknown) 45.65%; ▌I. W. Henderson (Unknown) 25.56%; ▌Finley (Unknown) 18.91%; ▌Darden (Unknown) 8.05%; Scattering 1.83%

== Utah Territory ==
See non-voting delegates, below.

== Vermont ==
District	Incumbent			This race	
District	Member	Party	First elected	Results	Candidates
Vermont 1	Frederick E. Woodbridge	Republican	1863	Incumbent re-elected.	▌ ✓ Frederick E. Woodbridge (Republican) 77.55%; ▌Samuel Wells (Democratic) 22.28%; Scattering 0.16%
Vermont 2	Justin S. Morrill	Republican	1854	Incumbent retired. Republican hold.	▌ ✓ Luke P. Poland (Republican) 72.23%; ▌Charles M. Chase (Democratic) 26.21%; Others: ▌Peter T. Washburn (Republican) 0.37%; ▌Hampden Cutts (Unknown) 0.34%; ▌Julius Converse (Republican) 0.32%; ▌D. C. Denison (Republican) 0.24%; Scattering 0.29%
Vermont 3	Portus Baxter	Republican	1860	Incumbent lost re-election. Republican hold.	First ballot: ▌Portus Baxter (Republican) 46.77%; ▌Romeo H. Hoyt (Republican) 28.79%; ▌Waldo Brigham (Democratic) 21.67%; ▌J. S. Adams (Republican) 1.02%; ▌J. H. Woodward (Republican) 0.57%; ▌O. G. Wheeler (Republican) 0.55%; Scattering 0.61%; Second ballot: ▌ ✓ Worthington C. Smith (Republican) 50.93%; ▌Asa O. Aldis (Republican) 24.83%; ▌Waldo Brigham (Democratic) 23.82%; Others: ▌Portus Baxter (Republican) 0.2%; ▌Romeo H. Hoyt (Republican) 0.02%; Scattering 0.17%

== Virginia ==
Virginia did not hold elections until 1869 during Reconstruction.

District	Incumbent			This race	
District	Member	Party	First elected	Results	Candidates
Virginia 1	Vacant			Seat vacant since March 4, 1863. No election.	None.
Virginia 2	Vacant			Seat vacant since April 17, 1861. No election.	None.
Virginia 3	Vacant			Seat vacant since April 17, 1861. No election.	None.
Virginia 4	Vacant			Seat vacant since April 17, 1861. No election.	None.
Virginia 5	Vacant			Seat vacant since April 17, 1861. No election.	None.
Virginia 6	Vacant			Seat vacant since April 17, 1861. No election.	None.
Virginia 7	Vacant			Seat vacant since March 4, 1863. No election.	None.
Virginia 8	Vacant			Seat vacant since April 17, 1861. No election.	None.

== Washington Territory ==
See non-voting delegates, below.

== West Virginia ==
District	Incumbent			This race	
District	Member	Party	First elected	Results	Candidates
West Virginia 1	Chester D. Hubbard	Republican	1864	Incumbent re-elected.	▌ ✓ Chester D. Hubbard (Republican) 54.84%; ▌D. D. Johnson (Democratic) 45.16%
West Virginia 2	George R. Latham	Republican	1864	Incumbent retired. Republican hold.	▌ ✓ Bethuel Kitchen (Republican) 61.31%; ▌E. W. Andrews (Democratic) 38.35%; ▌Daniel Polsley (Republican) 0.35%
West Virginia 3	Kellian Whaley	Republican	1863	Incumbent retired. Republican hold.	▌ ✓ Daniel Polsley (Republican) 58.77%; ▌John H. Oley (Democratic) 41.23%

== Wisconsin ==
District	Incumbent			This race	
District	Member	Party	First elected	Results	Candidates
Wisconsin 1	Halbert E. Paine	Republican	1864	Incumbent re-elected.	▌ ✓ Halbert E. Paine (Republican) 58.77%; ▌James S. Brown (Democratic) 41.23%
Wisconsin 2	Ithamar Sloan	Republican	1862	Incumbent lost renomination. Republican hold.	▌ ✓ Benjamin F. Hopkins (Republican) 61.53%; ▌John J. Pease (Democratic) 38.47%
Wisconsin 3	Amasa Cobb	Republican	1862	Incumbent re-elected.	▌ ✓ Amasa Cobb (Republican) 62.95%; ▌Noah Virgin (Democratic) 37.05%
Wisconsin 4	Charles A. Eldredge	Democratic	1862	Incumbent re-elected.	▌ ✓ Charles A. Eldredge (Democratic) 56.57%; ▌Orin Hatch (Republican) 43.43%
Wisconsin 5	Philetus Sawyer	Republican	1864	Incumbent re-elected.	▌ ✓ Philetus Sawyer (Republican) 60.54%; ▌Morgan L. Martin (Democratic) 39.46%
Wisconsin 6	Walter D. McIndoe	Republican	1862 (special)	Incumbent retired. Republican hold.	▌ ✓ Cadwallader C. Washburn (Republican) 66.44%; ▌Gilbert L. Park (Democratic) 33.56%

== Non-voting delegates ==
District	Incumbent			This race	
District	Delegate	Party	First elected	Results	Candidates
Arizona Territory at-large	John Noble Goodwin	Pro-administration/ Union (Note: Party lines were ambiguous at the time of this election. Goodwin belonged to the governing political faction in the Arizona Territory, and caucused with the Union Party in Congress.)	1865	Incumbent retired. Pro-administration/Union hold.	▌ ✓ Coles Bashford (Pro-administration/Union) 59.53%; ▌Charles D. Poston (Anti-administration/Union) 30.56%; ▌Samuel Adams (Union) 9.91%
Colorado Territory at-large	Allen Alexander Bradford	Anti-Statehood	1864	Incumbent retired. Republican gain.	▌ ✓ George M. Chilcott (Republican) 50.62%; ▌Alexander C. Hunt (Administration) 48.46%; Others: ▌H. Butler (Unknown) 0.64%; ▌J. B. Wolf (Unknown) 0.18%; ▌Allen A. Bradford (Unknown) 0.00%; ▌P. Cooper (Unknown) 0.00%; ▌H. C. Hunt (Unknown) 0.00%; Scattering 0.00%; ▌
Dakota Territory at-large	Walter A. Burleigh	Conservative	1864	Incumbent re-elected.	▌ ✓ Walter A. Burleigh (C, D) 70.19%; ▌Wilmot Brookings (Republican) 29.01%
Idaho Territory at-large	Edward Dexter Holbrook	Democratic	1864	Incumbent re-elected.	▌ ✓ Edward D. Holbrook (Democratic) 55.47%; ▌J. M. Kirkpatrick (Republican) 44.53%
Montana Territory at-large	Samuel McLean	Democratic	1864	Incumbent retired. Democratic hold.	▌ ✓ James M. Cavanaugh (Democratic) 55.08%; ▌Wilbur F. Sanders (Republican) 44.92%
New Mexico Territory at-large	J. Francisco Chaves	Republican	1865	Incumbent lost re-election. Democratic gain.	▌ ✓ Charles P. Clever (Democratic) 50.28%; ▌J. Francisco Chaves (Republican) 49.72%
Utah Territory at-large	William Henry Hooper	Democratic	1865	Incumbent re-elected.	▌ ✓ William H. Hooper (Democratic) 99.31%; ▌William B. McGrorty (Unknown) 0.69%; ▌Cy (Unknown) 0.00%
Washington Territory at-large	Arthur Armstrong Denny	Republican	1865	Incumbent retired. Republican hold.	▌ ✓ Alvan Flanders (Republican) 51.08%; ▌Frank Clark (Democratic) 48.92%

== See also ==
- 1866 United States elections
  - 1866–67 United States Senate elections
- 39th United States Congress
- 40th United States Congress

== Bibliography ==
=== Primary sources ===
- Greeley, Horace, ed. (1867). Tribune Almanac and Political Advertiser. Albany.
- Greeley, Horace, ed. (1868). Tribune Almanac and Political Advertiser. Albany.
- Evening Journal Almanac (1867). The Evening Journal Almanac. Albany.
- Evening Journal Almanac (1868). The Evening Journal Almanac. Albany.

=== Secondary sources ===
- Alexander, Thomas B. (1950). Political Reconstruction in Tennessee. New York: Russell and Russell.
- Baker, Jean H. (1973). The Politics of Continuity: Maryland Political Parties from 1858 to 1870. Baltimore: Johns Hopkins University. ISBN 978-0-8018-1418-1.
- Bradley, Erwin Stanley (1964). The Triumph of Militant Republicanism: A Study of Pennsylvania and Presidential Politics, 1860–1872. Philadelphia: University of Pennsylvania Press.
- Dubin, Michael J. (March 1, 1998). United States Congressional Elections, 1788-1997: The Official Results of the Elections of the 1st Through 105th Congresses. McFarland and Company. ISBN 978-0786402830.
- Foner, Eric (2014). Reconstruction: America's Unfinished Revolution, 1863–77 (Revised ed.). New York: HarperPerennial. ISBN 978-0-06-235451-8.
- Goff, John S. (Spring 1969). "The Arizona Career of Coles Bashford". Journal of Arizona History. 10 (1): 19–36.
- Lamar, Howard Roberts (1956). Dakota Territory, 1861–1889: A Study of Frontier Politics. New Haven, CT: Yale University Press.
- Parrish, William E. (1973). A History of Missouri, Volume 3: 1860 to 1875. Columbia: University of Missouri Press. ISBN 978-0-8262-0108-9.
- Wagoner, Jay J. (1970). Arizona Territory, 1863–1912: A Political History. Tucson: University of Arizona Press. ISBN 978-0-8165-0176-2.
- Webb, Ross A. (1969). "Kentucky: "Pariah Among the Elect"". In Curry, Richard Orr (ed.). Radicalism, Racism, and Party Realignment: The Border States during Reconstruction. Baltimore: Johns Hopkins Press. pp. 105–45.
- Whitney, Orson F. (1893). History of Utah. Vol. 2. Salt Lake City.
- Vermont (2026). "Election Results Archive". Secretary of State.
