= Kentucky's 9th congressional district =

District of the United States House of Representatives in Kentucky

Coordinates: 36°50′N 83°50′W

- Obsolete district
- Created: 1810
- Eliminated: 1950
- Years active: 1813–1953

Kentucky's 9th congressional district was a district of the United States House of Representatives in Kentucky. It was lost to redistricting in 1953. Its last representative was James S. Golden.

== List of members representing the district ==
Member	Party	Years	Cong ress	Electoral history	Location
District created March 4, 1813
Thomas Montgomery (Stanford)	Democratic-Republican	March 4, 1813 – March 3, 1815	13th	Elected in 1812. Lost re-election.	1813–1823; Adair, Casey, Knox, Lincoln, Pulaski, Rockcastle, and Wayne counties
Micah Taul (Monticello)	Democratic-Republican	March 4, 1815 – March 3, 1817	14th	Elected in 1814. Retired.	1813–1823; Adair, Casey, Knox, Lincoln, Pulaski, Rockcastle, and Wayne counties
Tunstall Quarles (Somerset)	Democratic-Republican	March 4, 1817 – June 15, 1820	15th 16th	Elected in 1816. Re-elected in 1818. Resigned.	1813–1823; Adair, Casey, Knox, Lincoln, Pulaski, Rockcastle, and Wayne counties
Vacant		June 15, 1820 – August 1, 1820	16th		1813–1823; Adair, Casey, Knox, Lincoln, Pulaski, Rockcastle, and Wayne counties
Thomas Montgomery (Stanford)	Democratic-Republican	August 1, 1820 – March 3, 1823	16th 17th	Elected to finish Quarles's term. Re-elected later in 1820. Retired.	1813–1823; Adair, Casey, Knox, Lincoln, Pulaski, Rockcastle, and Wayne counties
Charles A. Wickliffe (Bardstown)	Democratic-Republican	March 4, 1823 – March 3, 1825	18th 19th 20th 21st 22nd	Elected in 1822. Re-elected in 1824. Re-elected in 1827. Re-elected in 1829. Re-elected in 1831. Retired.	1823–1833; Bullitt, Jefferson, and Nelson counties
Charles A. Wickliffe (Bardstown)	Jacksonian	March 4, 1825 – March 3, 1833	18th 19th 20th 21st 22nd	Elected in 1822. Re-elected in 1824. Re-elected in 1827. Re-elected in 1829. Re-elected in 1831. Retired.	1823–1833; Bullitt, Jefferson, and Nelson counties
James Love (Barbourville)	Anti-Jacksonian	March 4, 1833 – March 3, 1835	23rd	Elected in 1833. Renominated but declined.	1833–1843 [data missing]
John White (Richmond)	Anti-Jacksonian	March 4, 1835 – March 3, 1837	24th 25th 26th 27th	Elected in 1835. Re-elected in 1837. Re-elected in 1839. Re-elected in 1841. Redistricted to the 6th district.	1833–1843 [data missing]
John White (Richmond)	Whig	March 4, 1837 – March 3, 1843	24th 25th 26th 27th	Elected in 1835. Re-elected in 1837. Re-elected in 1839. Re-elected in 1841. Redistricted to the 6th district.	1833–1843 [data missing]
Richard French (Mount Sterling)	Democratic	March 4, 1843 – March 3, 1845	28th	Elected in 1843. Lost re-election.	1843–1853 [data missing]
Andrew Trumbo (Owingsville)	Whig	March 4, 1845 – March 3, 1847	29th	Elected in 1845. Retired.	1843–1853 [data missing]
Richard French (Mount Sterling)	Democratic	March 4, 1847 – March 3, 1849	30th	Elected in 1847. Retired.	1843–1853 [data missing]
John C. Mason (Owingsville)	Democratic	March 4, 1849 – March 3, 1853	31st 32nd	Elected in 1849. Re-elected in 1851. Retired.	1843–1853 [data missing]
Leander Cox (Flemingsburg)	Whig	March 4, 1853 – March 3, 1855	33rd 34th	Elected in 1853. Re-elected in 1855. Lost re-election.	1853–1863 [data missing]
Leander Cox (Flemingsburg)	Know Nothing	March 4, 1855 – March 3, 1857	33rd 34th	Elected in 1853. Re-elected in 1855. Lost re-election.	1853–1863 [data missing]
John C. Mason (Owingsville)	Democratic	March 4, 1857 – March 3, 1859	35th	Elected in 1857. Retired.	1853–1863 [data missing]
Laban T. Moore (Louisa)	Opposition	March 4, 1859 – March 3, 1861	36th	Elected in 1859. Retired.	1853–1863 [data missing]
William H. Wadsworth (Maysville)	Union Democratic	March 4, 1861 – March 3, 1865	37th 38th	Elected in 1861. Re-elected in 1863. Retired.	1853–1863 [data missing]
William H. Wadsworth (Maysville)	Union Democratic	March 4, 1861 – March 3, 1865	37th 38th	Elected in 1861. Re-elected in 1863. Retired.	1863–1873 [data missing]
Samuel McKee (Mount Sterling)	Unconditional Union	March 4, 1865 – March 3, 1867	39th	Elected in 1865. Lost re-election.	1863–1873 [data missing]
Vacant		March 3, 1867 – June 22, 1868	40th	John D. Young was elected in 1867 but his election was overturned due to voter intimidation and fraud.	1863–1873 [data missing]
Samuel McKee (Mount Sterling)	Republican	June 22, 1868 – March 3, 1869	40th	Successfully contested election of representative-elect John D. Young. Retired.	1863–1873 [data missing]
John M. Rice (Louisa)	Democratic	March 4, 1869 – March 3, 1873	41st 42nd	Elected in 1868. Re-elected in 1870. Retired.	1863–1873 [data missing]
George M. Adams (Barbourville)	Democratic	March 4, 1873 – March 3, 1875	43rd	Redistricted from the 8th district and re-elected in 1872. Lost re-election.	1873–1883 [data missing]
John D. White (Manchester)	Republican	March 4, 1875 – March 3, 1877	44th	Elected in 1874. Retired.	1873–1883 [data missing]
Thomas Turner (Mount Sterling)	Democratic	March 4, 1877 – March 3, 1881	45th 46th	Elected in 1876. Re-elected in 1878. Lost re-election.	1873–1883 [data missing]
John D. White (Manchester)	Republican	March 4, 1881 – March 3, 1883	47th	Elected in 1880. Redistricted to the 10th district.	1873–1883 [data missing]
William Culbertson (Ashland)	Republican	March 4, 1883 – March 3, 1885	48th	Elected in 1882. Retired.	1883–1893 [data missing]
William H. Wadsworth (Maysville)	Republican	March 4, 1885 – March 3, 1887	49th	Elected in 1884. Retired.	1883–1893 [data missing]
George M. Thomas (Vanceburg)	Republican	March 4, 1887 – March 3, 1889	50th	Elected in 1886. Retired.	1883–1893 [data missing]
Thomas H. Paynter (Greenup)	Democratic	March 4, 1889 – January 5, 1895	51st 52nd 53rd	Elected in 1888. Re-elected in 1890. Re-elected in 1892. Retired and resigned when elected to the Kentucky Court of Appeals.	1883–1893 [data missing]
Thomas H. Paynter (Greenup)	Democratic	March 4, 1889 – January 5, 1895	51st 52nd 53rd	Elected in 1888. Re-elected in 1890. Re-elected in 1892. Retired and resigned when elected to the Kentucky Court of Appeals.	1893–1903 [data missing]
Vacant		January 5, 1895 – March 4, 1895	53rd		1893–1903 [data missing]
Samuel J. Pugh (Vanceburg)	Republican	March 4, 1895 – March 3, 1901	54th 55th 56th	Elected in 1894. Re-elected in 1896. Re-elected in 1898. Lost re-election.	1893–1903 [data missing]
James N. Kehoe (Maysville)	Democratic	March 4, 1901 – March 3, 1905	57th 58th	Elected in 1900. Re-elected in 1902. Lost re-election.	1893–1903 [data missing]
James N. Kehoe (Maysville)	Democratic	March 4, 1901 – March 3, 1905	57th 58th	Elected in 1900. Re-elected in 1902. Lost re-election.	1903–1913 [data missing]
Joseph B. Bennett (Greenup)	Republican	March 4, 1905 – March 3, 1911	59th 60th 61st	Elected in 1904. Re-elected in 1906. Re-elected in 1908. Lost re-election.	1903–1913 [data missing]
William J. Fields (Olive Hill)	Democratic	March 4, 1911 – December 11, 1923	62nd 63rd 64th 65th 66th 67th 68th	Elected in 1910. Re-elected in 1912. Re-elected in 1914. Re-elected in 1916. Re-elected in 1918. Re-elected in 1920. Re-elected in 1922. Resigned when elected Governor.	1903–1913 [data missing]
William J. Fields (Olive Hill)	Democratic	March 4, 1911 – December 11, 1923	62nd 63rd 64th 65th 66th 67th 68th	Elected in 1910. Re-elected in 1912. Re-elected in 1914. Re-elected in 1916. Re-elected in 1918. Re-elected in 1920. Re-elected in 1922. Resigned when elected Governor.	1913–1933
Vacant		December 11, 1923 – January 24, 1924	68th		1913–1933
Fred M. Vinson (Louisa)	Democratic	January 24, 1924 – March 3, 1929	68th 69th 70th	Elected to finish Fields's term. Re-elected in 1924. Re-elected in 1926. Lost re-election.	1913–1933
Elva R. Kendall (Carlisle)	Republican	March 4, 1929 – March 3, 1931	71st	Elected in 1928. Lost re-election.	1913–1933
Fred M. Vinson (Ashland)	Democratic	March 4, 1931 – March 3, 1933	72nd	Elected in 1930. Redistricted to the at-large district.	1913–1933
District inactive		March 4, 1933 – January 3, 1935	73rd		
John M. Robsion (Barbourville)	Republican	January 3, 1935 – February 17, 1948	74th 75th 76th 77th 78th 79th 80th	Elected in 1934. Re-elected in 1936. Re-elected in 1938. Re-elected in 1940. Re-elected in 1942. Re-elected in 1944. Re-elected in 1946. Died.	1935-1953
Vacant		February 17, 1948 – April 24, 1948	80th		1935-1953
William Lewis (London)	Republican	April 24, 1948 – January 3, 1949	80th	Elected to finish Robsion's term. Retired.	1935-1953
James S. Golden (Pineville)	Republican	January 3, 1949 – January 3, 1953	81st 82nd	Elected in 1948. Re-elected in 1950. Redistricted to the 8th district.	1935-1953
District eliminated January 3, 1953
