= John Calvin Mason =

American politician (1802–1865)

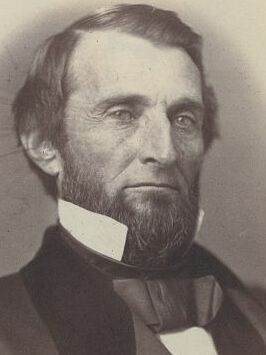
- Mason, c. 1859

Member of the U.S. House of Representatives from Kentucky's 9th district
- In office March 4, 1857 – March 3, 1859
- Preceded by: Leander Cox
- Succeeded by: Laban T. Moore
- In office March 4, 1849 – March 3, 1853
- Preceded by: Richard French
- Succeeded by: Leander Cox

Member of the Kentucky House of Representatives
- In office 1839; 1844; 1848

Personal details
- Born: August 4, 1802 Montgomery County, Kentucky, U.S.
- Died: August 1865 (aged 62–63) On the Mississippi River near New Orleans, Louisiana, U.S.
- Resting place: Frankfort Cemetery
- Party: Democratic
- Education: Transylvania University
- Profession: Lawyer

Military service
- Allegiance: United States of America; Confederate States of America
- Unit: Texas Rangers
- Battles/wars: Mexican–American War; American Civil War

John Calvin Mason (August 4, 1802 – August 1865) was a U.S. representative from Kentucky.

== Biography ==
Born near Mount Sterling, Kentucky, Mason attended country and city schools in Montgomery County and Mount Sterling Law School in Lexington, Kentucky. He graduated from Transylvania University, Lexington, Kentucky, in 1823. He was admitted to the bar and practiced in Mount Sterling. He engaged extensively in the manufacture of iron. He served as a member of the Kentucky House of Representatives in 1839, 1844, and 1848. He served in the war with Mexico in 1846 and 1847 in Ben McCollough's company of Texas Rangers, Worth's division, under General Taylor. He moved to Owingsville, Kentucky, in 1847.

Mason was elected as a Democrat to the Thirty-first and Thirty-second Congresses (March 4, 1849 – March 3, 1853). He served as chairman of the Committee on Accounts (Thirty-first and Thirty-second Congresses). He was not a candidate for renomination in 1852.

Mason was elected to the Thirty-fifth Congress (March 4, 1857 – March 3, 1859). He served as chairman of the Committee on Accounts (Thirty-fifth Congress). He was not a candidate for renomination in 1858. He served as a delegate to the 1860 Democratic National Convention at Charleston, South Carolina. He served as a presidential elector on the Democratic ticket of Douglas and Johnson in 1860. During the Civil War served with Texas State troops from Brenham, Texas in 1863. He died in August 1865, near New Orleans, Louisiana on board a steamer on the Mississippi River. He was interred in the State Cemetery, Frankfort, Kentucky.

U.S. House of Representatives
Preceded by Richard French	Member of the U.S. House of Representatives from Kentucky's 9th congressional district 1849 – 1853	Succeeded by Leander Cox
Preceded by Leander Cox	Member of the U.S. House of Representatives from Kentucky's 9th congressional district 1857 – 1859	Succeeded by Laban T. Moore
