= Milton J. Durham =

American politician

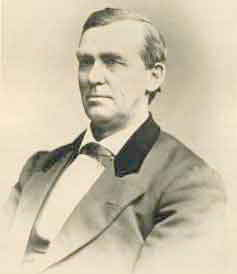

First Comptroller of the Treasury
- In office March 20, 1885 – April 22, 1889
- Preceded by: William Lawrence
- Succeeded by: Office abolished

Member of the U.S. House of Representatives from Kentucky's 8th district
- In office March 4, 1873 – March 3, 1879
- Preceded by: George Madison Adams
- Succeeded by: Philip B. Thompson, Jr.

Personal details
- Born: May 16, 1824 Mercer County, Kentucky
- Died: February 12, 1911 (aged 86) Lexington, Kentucky
- Resting place: Bellevue Cemetery, Danville, Kentucky
- Party: Democratic
- Spouse(s): Martha J. Mitchell; Margaret Letcher Carter
- Education: DePauw University
- Profession: Lawyer

Milton Jameson Durham (May 16, 1824 – February 12, 1911) was a U.S. representative from Kentucky and served as First Comptroller of the Treasury in the administration of President Grover Cleveland. An alumnus of DePauw University and the University of Louisville School of Law, Durham held no political office prior to his appointment as a circuit court judge by Governor Beriah Magoffin in 1861. He was elected to represent Kentucky's Eighth District in Congress in 1872. He served three terms and was a member of several finance-related committees. He was narrowly defeated for renomination in 1878 by Philip B. Thompson, Jr. at the district's Democratic nominating convention.

After unsuccessfully trying to regain the Eighth District seat from Thompson in 1884, Durham was appointed First Comptroller of the Treasury in 1885, serving throughout President Cleveland's term. In 1890, after battling a severe case of influenza, Durham abandoned his law practice, moving to Lexington, Kentucky and helping organize the Bank of Lexington. He was an officer of the bank for several years. He ardently held to a sound money position during the height of the Free Silver movement. He was appointed deputy clerk of the Internal Revenue Service at Lexington in 1901, a position he held until his death on February 12, 1911.

== Early life and family ==
Milton J. Durham was born near Perryville, Mercer County (now Boyle County), Kentucky. He was the son of Benjamin and Margaret (Robinson) Durham. His grandfather, John Durham, established the first Methodist church west of the Allegheny Mountains, and his descendants, including Durham, were adherents of the Methodist Episcopal Church, South.

Durham attained his early education in the common schools of the area. In January 1841, he matriculated to Indiana Asbury (now De Pauw) University in Greencastle, Indiana and graduated with honors in 1844. After graduation, he taught in the common schools of Perryville and read law under Joshua Fry Bell. He attended the University of Louisville School of Law and graduated in March 1850. He was admitted to the bar in the same year and commenced practice in Danville, Kentucky. For several years, he served on the Board of Commissioners for the Kentucky Deaf and Dumb Asylum in Danville.

On June 18, 1850, Durham married Martha J. Mitchell. The couple had five children – Louis H. Durham, Benjamin J. Durham, James Wesley Durham, Robert M. Durham, and Ora B. (Durham) Morris. Martha Durham died in 1879. After the death of his first wife, Durham married Margaret Letcher Carter in 1886.

== Political career ==
Although active in Democratic politics and frequently urged by friends and acquaintances to seek a seat in the Kentucky House of Representatives or Kentucky Senate, Durham held no public office prior to 1861. In that year, Governor Beriah Magoffin appointed him circuit judge of the eighth judicial district. He served until 1862, but declined further service on the bench.

In 1872, Durham was elected to represent the heavily Democratic Eighth District in the U.S. House of Representatives, defeating Republican William O. Bradley by a vote of 10,874 to 9,925. He served in the Forty-third, Forty-fourth, and Forty-fifth Congresses (March 4, 1873 – March 3, 1879). During his congressional tenure, he served on the House Committees on Banking and Currency, Coinage, and Weights and Measures, and chaired the House Committees on Appropriations and Revision of the Laws. He also served on committees investigating the failure of the First Bank of the United States, alleged fraud in the Western Judicial District of Arkansas, the accounts of the Bureau of Engraving and Printing, and the condition of the Freedman's Savings and Trust Company. In response to the investigation of Freedman's Savings and Trust, he sponsored legislation designed to better secure the company's assets. He also made notable speeches on the subjects of the Civil Rights Act of 1871 and the resumption of specie payments.

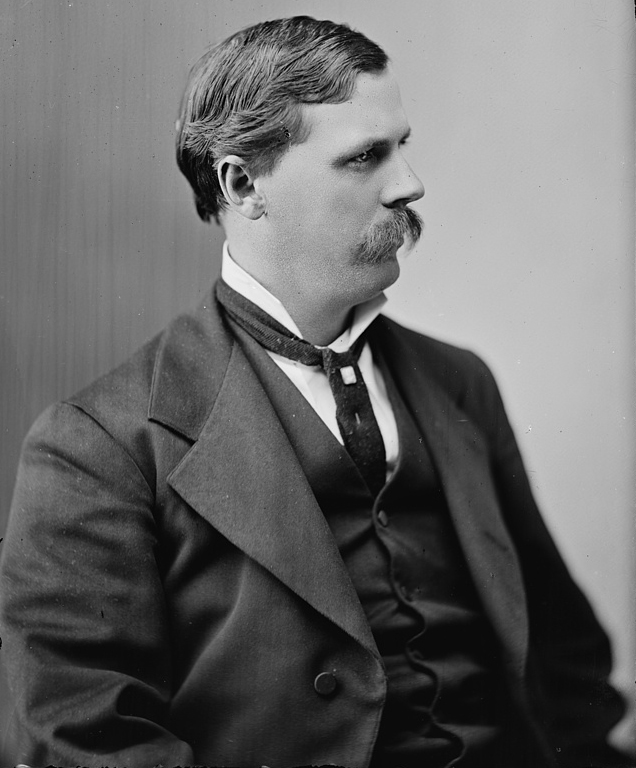
Philip B. Thompson, Jr. defeated Durham in 1878.

Durham sought re-election to his seat in 1878. He was opposed for the nomination by Philip B. Thompson, Jr., who defeated him by one-tenth of a vote at the Democratic nominating convention at Stanford, Kentucky and went on to defeat the Republican challenger, George Denny. At the expiration of his term, Durham returned to his law practice in Danville. He again sought the Democratic nomination to represent the Eighth District in 1884. His opponents were the incumbent, Philip B. Thompson, Jr., and former Governor James B. McCreary. So great was the excitement about the race that party leaders decided to choose the nominee by a primary election rather than a nominating convention for the first time in the history of the district. Durham finished behind both Thompson and McCreary, who won the nomination and went on to defeat the Republican nominee, James Sebastian.

In 1885, President Grover Cleveland appointed Durham First Comptroller of the Treasury of the United States; he served from March 20, 1885, until the office was discontinued on April 22, 1889. During his tenure, he sparked a minor controversy between himself and Governor J. Proctor Knott when, in a private letter to a friend, he suggested that Kentucky needed a financier in the governor's office. The letter went on to say that, while Durham had no plans to actively seek the Democratic gubernatorial nomination in 1887, he would consider running if the nomination were offered him, provided that President Cleveland approved of his resignation to seek the office. The courier who delivered the letter also shared it with a newspaper editor who subsequently published it. Governor Knott took the letter as a slap at his financial acumen. A noted satirist from his time in Congress, Knott responded with a biting letter in the local newspaper.

== Later life and death ==
After a severe bout with influenza, Durham's doctors advised him to abandon the practice of law. In 1890, he moved to Lexington, Kentucky and engaged in banking. He helped organize the Central Bank of Lexington and served as the bank's cashier and also served as the treasurer of the Blue Grass Building and Loan Association.

Remaining interested in politics, he was among the speakers at a May 14, 1894 rally to condemn the renomination of Congressman William Campbell Preston Breckinridge because of his admission, under oath, of having an extramarital affair. Later that year, the announcement of Durham as a replacement speaker for Senator William Lindsay at a rally in Mount Sterling, Kentucky advocating the gold standard touched off a riot among free silver supporters in which one man was killed and several others were injured. In 1896, Durham disputed an article that appeared in the Lexington Leader newspaper claiming that he and other sound money backers had advised Treasury Secretary John G. Carlisle not to visit Kentucky at that time. Durham's initial meeting with the newspaper's editor ended peacefully, but when Durham returned later in the day to further protest, he got into an altercation with one of the newspaper's writers and bloodied his face.

Durham was appointed deputy clerk of the Internal Revenue Service at Lexington in 1901 and served until his death in that city on February 12, 1911. He was interred in Bellevue Cemetery in Danville.

U.S. House of Representatives
Preceded by George M. Adams	Member of the U.S. House of Representatives from Kentucky's 8th congressional district 1873 – 1879	Succeeded by Philip B. Thompson, Jr.
