= Leander Cox =

American politician and lawyer (1812–1865)

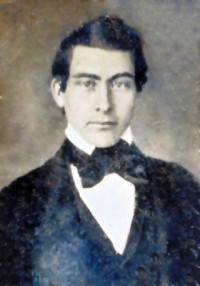

Member of the U.S. House of Representatives from Kentucky's 9th district
- In office March 4, 1853 – March 3, 1857
- Preceded by: John Calvin Mason
- Succeeded by: John Calvin Mason

Personal details
- Born: Leander Martin Cox; May 7, 1812 Cumberland County, Virginia, US
- Died: March 19, 1865 (aged 52) Flemingsburg, Kentucky, US
- Occupation: Politician, lawyer

Leander Martin Cox (May 7, 1812 – March 19, 1865) was an American politician and lawyer. A member of the Whig and Know Nothing parties, he served in the United States House of Representatives from 1853 to 1857, representing Kentucky's 9th district.

== Biography ==
Cox was born on May 7, 1812, in Cumberland County, Virginia. He received an education, afterwards reading then practicing law. He later moved to Flemingsburg, Kentucky. During the Mexican–American War, he served in the Third Kentucky Volunteers Regiment of the United States Army, and was its captain in 1847. He returned home from the war ill. He owned slaves.

Cox was a member of the Whig Party from before serving in the Mexican–American War. He later joined the Know Nothing party. However, The Political Graveyard states he was a member of the Democratic Party. From 1843 to 1845, he was Whig a member of the Kentucky House of Representatives.

Cox was a Know Nothing member of the United States House of Representatives from March 4, 1853, to March 3, 1857, representing Kentucky's 9th district. He lost the following election. He was an alternate delegate to the 1864 Democratic National Convention. Politically, he leaned liberal. He was a supporter of John Bell. When asked about the forthcoming American Civil War, he opposed it, describing the secession as "tragic".

After serving in Congress, Cox returned to practicing law. He died on March 19, 1865, aged 52, in Flemingsburg, and was buried at Fleming County Cemetery, in Flemingsburg. An archive of his papers is held at the library of the Kentucky Historical Society.

U.S. House of Representatives
| Preceded by John C. Mason | Member of the U.S. House of Representatives from Kentucky's 9th congressional district 1853 – 1857 | Succeeded by John C. Mason |
