= Machpelah Cemetery (Mount Sterling, Kentucky) =

Cemetery in Montgomery County, Kentucky

- U.S. National Register of Historic Places
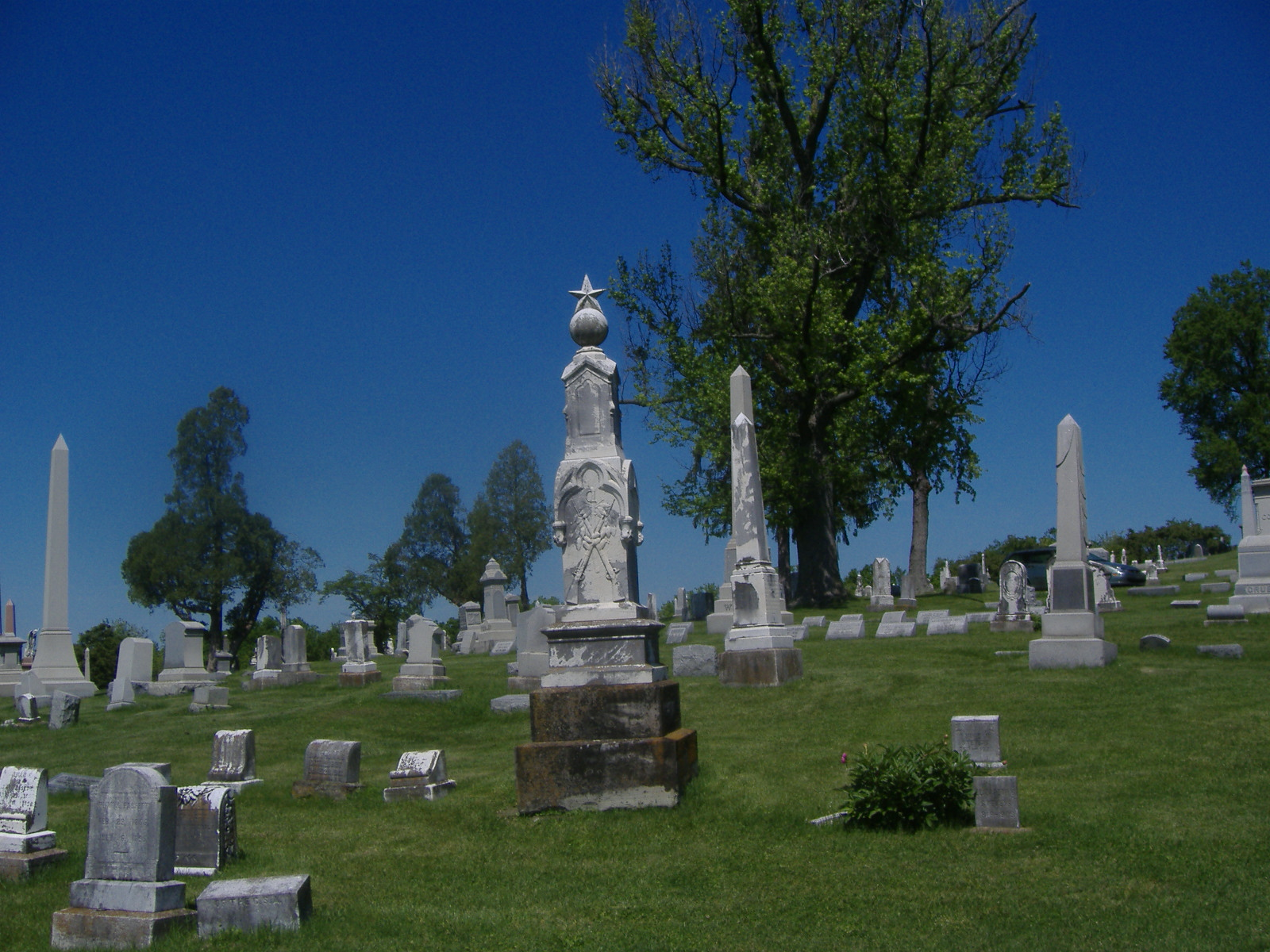
- Markers in Machpelah Cemetery

- Location within Kentucky Location within the United States
- Location: E. Main St. at eastern city limits, Mount Sterling, Kentucky
- Area: 12.3 acres (5.0 ha)
- Built: 1855
- MPS: Mount Sterling MPS
- NRHP reference No.: 91000427
- Added to NRHP: April 23, 1991

The Machpelah Cemetery is located near the eastern city limits of Mt. Sterling in Montgomery County, Kentucky. It has been listed as a National Register of Historic Place since April 23, 1991.

== History ==
In 1855, the International Organization of Odd Fellows (I.O.O.F) Watson Lodge #32, which was established inmate. Sterling in 1846, purchased the tract of land at the east end of East Main Street on which they developed Machpelah Cemetery. The cemetery originally was a joint venture with the Masons, but soon the I.O.O.F. became the sole trustee and continues to manage and maintain the cemetery. The name "Machpelah" has a Biblical origin as a burial ground described in the Old Testament.

Since 1940 improvements have been made to the pavement as well as a slight widening of the main roads. Secondary roads which were not paved are still visible, but have through disuse become grass-covered. The monuments and headstones in the Machpelah Cemetery from the late nineteenth century express the naturalistic motif with carvings of leaves, branches, and tree trunks. Since most significant Mt. Sterling families bought sections during the late nineteenth century, early twentieth century burials are mixed with those from the late nineteenth century, as families continued to fill up their space. These later burials, often indicated by low, unobtrusive headstones, are clustered around the nineteenth century monument with the family name. In the section of the cemetery south of East Main excluded from the boundary, the roads are wider and the design is rectilinear. The landscaping is limited and the plots are laid out on a grid for the most efficient use of the space and ease of maintenance. The majority of the post-1940 burials are located in the part of the cemetery located south of East Main Street and outside of the area proposed for listing.

== Location and layout ==
Machpelah Cemetery overlooks residential neighborhoods and strip commercial development leading into Mt. Sterling's commercial district to the west and scattered residences on agricultural land to the east outside the city limits of Mt. Sterling. The grassy slopes of the cemetery are open with few trees because most of the grave sites are clustered at the top third of the hill. The overall plan is curvilinear with the roads curving to conform to the topography. Most of the roads in the cemetery are narrow with small turning radii, designed more for horse-drawn vehicles than for automobiles. The design incorporates nature through the curvilinear layout. The design is similar to contemporary cemeteries such as Frankfort Cemetery (1844), Richmond Cemetery (1848), Cave Hill Cemetery, Louisville (1848), Lexington Cemetery (1848), and Georgetown Cemetery (1850).

The groupings of mature deciduous and evergreen trees result from the nineteenth century concept that rural cemeteries were to have a park-like atmosphere and be a place of repose and contemplation. Machpelah has mature specimens of trees including spruce, cedar, cherry, mulberry, maple, walnut, sweet gum, ash and a few dogwoods. Few buildings or crypts populate the cemetery and the landscape is punctuated with stone funerary sculptures from the late nineteenth century including obelisks, draped urns atop ornamented pedestals, figures of people, angels, and dogs.

== Interments ==
Many monuments use motifs from nature to illustrate the death of someone "cut down in the prime of life" such as the one dedicated to W. R. Patterson, a lawyer who died in 1887. The top of the 8-foot (2.4 m) tree trunk has been violently removed and its limbs wrenched off. The bark is deeply grooved with ivy winding around the base and books laid against the tree. There are also examples of figurative sculpture including the monument to Mattie Lee Mitchell placed in 1881. Mattie Lee Mitchell is depicted carrying a small child. The subdivision which includes a part of North Queen Street was named for her after her death by her husband, the developer. Other sculptures include the bronze figure of Richard Reid, a local lawyer who was murdered in 1884.

Members of many prominent Montgomery families are buried in the cemetery. The earliest date found on a gravestone was 1854 and the majority of the interments date from the late nineteenth and early twentieth centuries. The interments which date after 1940 are in the minority and most of these are noted by small headstones in family plots where the major monument was placed prior to 1940 and reflects the artistic values of the period of significance.

== Notable people ==
- Henry Daniel
- Amos Davis
- James William Moore
- Thomas Turner
- John Duncan Young
