= Samuel McKee (politician, born 1833) =

American politician (1833–1898)

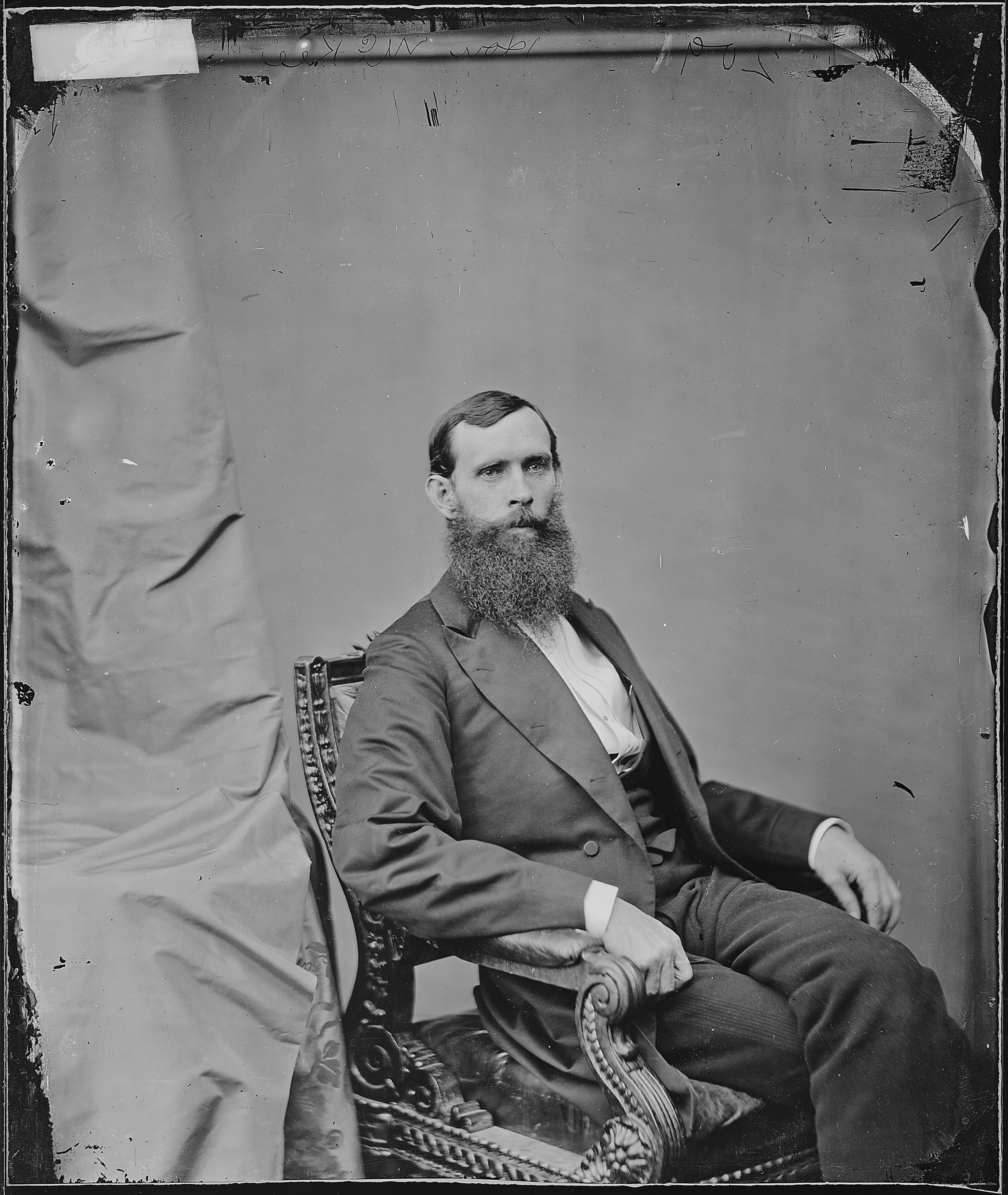
- Mathew Brady photo. National Archives and Records Administration.

Member of the U.S. House of Representatives from Kentucky's 9th congressional district
- In office June 22, 1868 – March 3, 1869
- Succeeded by: John McConnell Rice
- In office March 4, 1865 – March 3, 1867
- Preceded by: William H. Wadsworth

Personal details
- Born: November 5, 1833 Mount Sterling, Kentucky, U.S.
- Died: December 11, 1898 (aged 65) Louisville, Kentucky, U.S.
- Resting place: Cave Hill Cemetery; Louisville, Kentucky, U.S.
- Education: Miami University; Cincinnati Law School
- Military career
- Allegiance: United States
- Branch: Union Army
- Rank: Captain
- Unit: 14th Kentucky Volunteer Cavalry
- Conflicts: American Civil War

Samuel McKee (November 5, 1833 – December 11, 1898) was a U.S. representative from Kentucky.

== Early life ==
Born near Mount Sterling, Kentucky, McKee attended the common schools. He was graduated from Miami University, Oxford, Ohio, in 1857, and the Cincinnati Law School in 1858. He was admitted to the bar.

== Career ==
McKee commenced practice in Mount Sterling, Kentucky, in 1858. He served in the Union Army during the Civil War as a captain in the 14th Kentucky Volunteer Cavalry.

McKee was elected as an Unconditional Unionist to the Thirty-ninth Congress (March 4, 1865 – March 3, 1867). He successfully contested as a Republican the election of John D. Young to the Fortieth Congress and served from June 22, 1868, to March 3, 1869. He was not a candidate for renomination in 1868. He served as delegate to the Southern Loyalist Convention at Philadelphia in 1866. He worked as a pension agent in Louisville, Kentucky from 1869 to 1871. He resumed the practice of law. He died in Louisville, Kentucky on December 11, 1898. He was interred in Cave Hill Cemetery in Louisville.

U.S. House of Representatives
Preceded by William H. Wadsworth	Member of the U.S. House of Representatives from Kentucky's 9th congressional district 1865 – 1867	Succeeded by Himself
Preceded by Himself	Member of the U.S. House of Representatives from Kentucky's 9th congressional district 1868 – 1869	Succeeded by John McConnell Rice
