= Kentucky's 8th congressional district =

Federal legislative district in Kentucky, US

Coordinates: 36°50′N 84°00′W

- Obsolete district
- Created: 1810
- Eliminated: 1960
- Years active: 1813–1963

Kentucky's 8th congressional district was a district of the United States House of Representatives in Kentucky. It was lost to redistricting in 1963. Its last representative was Eugene Siler.

== List of members representing the district ==
Member	Party	Years	Cong ress	Electoral history	Location
District created March 4, 1813
Vacant		March 4, 1813 – April 20, 1813	13th	Representative-elect John Simpson died.	1813–1823; Bullett, Henry, Jefferson, and Shelby counties
Stephen Ormsby (Louisville)	Democratic-Republican	April 20, 1813 – March 3, 1817	13th 14th	Elected to finish Simpson's term. Re-elected in 1814. Lost re-election.	1813–1823; Bullett, Henry, Jefferson, and Shelby counties
Richard C. Anderson Jr. (Louisville)	Democratic-Republican	March 4, 1817 – March 3, 1821	15th 16th	Elected in 1816. Re-elected in 1818. Retired.	1813–1823; Bullett, Henry, Jefferson, and Shelby counties
Wingfield Bullock (Shelbyville)	Democratic-Republican	March 4, 1821 – October 13, 1821	17th	Elected in 1820. Died.	1813–1823; Bullett, Henry, Jefferson, and Shelby counties
Vacant		October 13, 1821 – November 21, 1821	17th		1813–1823; Bullett, Henry, Jefferson, and Shelby counties
James D. Breckinridge (Louisville)	Democratic-Republican	November 21, 1821 – March 3, 1823	17th	Elected to finish Bullock's term and seated January 2, 1822. Redistricted to the 9th district and lost re-election there.	1813–1823; Bullett, Henry, Jefferson, and Shelby counties
Richard A. Buckner (Greensburg)	Democratic-Republican	March 4, 1823 – March 3, 1825	18th 19th 20th	Elected in 1822. Re-elected in 1824. Re-elected in 1827. Retired.	1823–1833; Adair, Casey, Cumberland, Green, Pulaski, and Wayne counties
Richard A. Buckner (Greensburg)	Anti-Jacksonian	March 4, 1825 – March 3, 1829	18th 19th 20th	Elected in 1822. Re-elected in 1824. Re-elected in 1827. Retired.	1823–1833; Adair, Casey, Cumberland, Green, Pulaski, and Wayne counties
Nathan Gaither (Columbia)	Jacksonian	March 4, 1829 – March 3, 1833	21st 22nd	Elected in 1829. Re-elected in 1831. Redistricted to the 4th district and lost re-election there.	1823–1833; Adair, Casey, Cumberland, Green, Pulaski, and Wayne counties
Patrick H. Pope (Louisville)	Jacksonian	March 4, 1833 – March 3, 1835	23rd	Elected in 1833. Lost re-election.	1833–1843 [data missing]
William J. Graves (New Castle)	Anti-Jacksonian	March 4, 1835 – March 3, 1837	24th	Elected in 1835. Re-elected in 1837. Re-elected in 1839. Retired.	1833–1843 [data missing]
William J. Graves (New Castle)	Whig	March 4, 1837 – March 3, 1841	25th 26th	Elected in 1835. Re-elected in 1837. Re-elected in 1839. Retired.	1833–1843 [data missing]
James Sprigg (Shelbyville)	Whig	March 4, 1841 – March 3, 1843	27th	Elected in 1841. Redistricted to the 7th district and lost re-election as an independent.	1833–1843 [data missing]
Garrett Davis (Paris)	Whig	March 4, 1843 – March 3, 1847	28th 29th	Redistricted from the 12th district and re-elected in 1843. Re-elected in 1845. Retired.	1843–1853 [data missing]
Charles S. Morehead (Frankfort)	Whig	March 4, 1847 – March 3, 1851	30th 31st	Elected in 1847. Re-elected in 1849. Retired.	1843–1853 [data missing]
John C. Breckinridge (Lexington)	Democratic	March 4, 1851 – March 3, 1855	32nd 33rd	Elected in 1851. Re-elected in 1853. Retired.	1843–1853 [data missing]
John C. Breckinridge (Lexington)	Democratic	March 4, 1851 – March 3, 1855	32nd 33rd	Elected in 1851. Re-elected in 1853. Retired.	1853–1863 [data missing]
Alexander K. Marshall (Nicholasville)	Know Nothing	March 4, 1855 – March 3, 1857	34th	Elected in 1855. Retired.	1853–1863 [data missing]
James B. Clay (Lexington)	Democratic	March 4, 1857 – March 3, 1859	35th	Elected in 1857. Retired.	1853–1863 [data missing]
William E. Simms (Paris)	Democratic	March 4, 1859 – March 3, 1861	36th	Elected in 1859. Lost re-election.	1853–1863 [data missing]
John J. Crittenden (Frankfort)	Union Democratic	March 4, 1861 – March 3, 1863	37th	Elected in 1861. Renominated but withdrew prior to election.	1853–1863 [data missing]
William H. Randall (London)	Unconditional Union	March 4, 1863 – March 3, 1867	38th 39th	Elected in 1863. Re-elected in 1865. Retired.	1863–1873 [data missing]
George M. Adams (Barbourville)	Democratic	March 4, 1867 – March 3, 1873	40th 41st 42nd	Elected in 1867. Re-elected in 1868. Re-elected in 1870. Redistricted to the 9th district.	1863–1873 [data missing]
Milton J. Durham (Danville)	Democratic	March 4, 1873 – March 3, 1879	43rd 44th 45th	Elected in 1872. Re-elected in 1874. Re-elected in 1876. Lost renomination.	1873–1883 [data missing]
Philip B. Thompson Jr. (Harrodsburg)	Democratic	March 4, 1879 – March 3, 1885	46th 47th 48th	Elected in 1878. Re-elected in 1880. Re-elected in 1882. Retired.	1873–1883 [data missing]
Philip B. Thompson Jr. (Harrodsburg)	Democratic	March 4, 1879 – March 3, 1885	46th 47th 48th	Elected in 1878. Re-elected in 1880. Re-elected in 1882. Retired.	1883–1893 [data missing]
James B. McCreary (Richmond)	Democratic	March 4, 1885 – March 3, 1897	49th 50th 51st 52nd 53rd 54th	Elected in 1884. Re-elected in 1886. Re-elected in 1888. Re-elected in 1890. Re-elected in 1892. Re-elected in 1894. Lost renomination.	1883–1893 [data missing]
James B. McCreary (Richmond)	Democratic	March 4, 1885 – March 3, 1897	49th 50th 51st 52nd 53rd 54th	Elected in 1884. Re-elected in 1886. Re-elected in 1888. Re-elected in 1890. Re-elected in 1892. Re-elected in 1894. Lost renomination.	1893–1903 [data missing]
George M. Davison (Stanford)	Republican	March 4, 1897 – March 3, 1899	55th	Elected in 1896. Lost re-election.	1893–1903 [data missing]
George G. Gilbert (Shelbyville)	Democratic	March 4, 1899 – March 3, 1907	56th 57th 58th 59th	Elected in 1898. Re-elected in 1900. Re-elected in 1902. Re-elected in 1904. Retired.	1893–1903 [data missing]
George G. Gilbert (Shelbyville)	Democratic	March 4, 1899 – March 3, 1907	56th 57th 58th 59th	Elected in 1898. Re-elected in 1900. Re-elected in 1902. Re-elected in 1904. Retired.	1903–1913 [data missing]
Harvey Helm (Stanford)	Democratic	March 4, 1907 – March 3, 1919	60th 61st 62nd 63rd 64th 65th	Elected in 1906. Re-elected in 1908. Re-elected in 1910. Re-elected in 1912. Re-elected in 1914. Re-elected in 1916. Re-elected in 1918 but died before next term began.	1903–1913 [data missing]
Harvey Helm (Stanford)	Democratic	March 4, 1907 – March 3, 1919	60th 61st 62nd 63rd 64th 65th	Elected in 1906. Re-elected in 1908. Re-elected in 1910. Re-elected in 1912. Re-elected in 1914. Re-elected in 1916. Re-elected in 1918 but died before next term began.	1913–1933
Vacant		March 3, 1919 – August 1, 1919	66th		1913–1933
King Swope (Danville)	Republican	August 1, 1919 – March 3, 1921	66th	Elected to finish Helm's term. Lost re-election.	1913–1933
Ralph W. E. Gilbert (Shelbyville)	Democratic	March 4, 1921 – March 3, 1929	67th 68th 69th 70th	Elected in 1920. Re-elected in 1922. Re-elected in 1924. Re-elected in 1926. Lost re-election.	1913–1933
Lewis L. Walker (Lancaster)	Republican	March 4, 1929 – March 3, 1931	71st	Elected in 1928. Retired.	1913–1933
Ralph W. E. Gilbert (Shelbyville)	Democratic	March 4, 1931 – March 3, 1933	72nd	Elected in 1930. Retired.	1913–1933
District inactive		March 4, 1933 – January 3, 1935	73rd		
Fred M. Vinson (Ashland)	Democratic	January 3, 1935 – May 27, 1938	74th 75th	Redistricted from the at-large district and re-elected in 1934. Re-elected in 1936. Resigned to become Associate Judge of the U.S. Court of Appeals for the District of Columbia Circuit.	1935–1953
Vacant		May 27, 1938 – June 4, 1938	66th		1935–1953
Joe B. Bates (Greenup)	Democratic	June 4, 1938 – January 3, 1953	75th 76th 77th 78th 79th 80th 81st 82nd	Elected to finish Vinson's term. Re-elected in 1938. Re-elected in 1940. Re-elected in 1942. Re-elected in 1944. Re-elected in 1946. Re-elected in 1948. Re-elected in 1950. Lost renomination.	1935–1953
James S. Golden (Pineville)	Republican	January 3, 1953 – January 3, 1955	83rd	Redistricted from the 9th district and re-elected in 1952. Retired.	1953–1957
Eugene Siler (Williamsburg)	Republican	January 3, 1955 – January 3, 1963	84th 85th 86th 87th	Elected in 1954. Re-elected in 1956. Re-elected in 1958. Re-elected in 1960. Redistricted to the 5th district.	1953–1957
Eugene Siler (Williamsburg)	Republican	January 3, 1955 – January 3, 1963	84th 85th 86th 87th	Elected in 1954. Re-elected in 1956. Re-elected in 1958. Re-elected in 1960. Redistricted to the 5th district.	1957–1963
District eliminated January 3, 1963
