= Philip B. Thompson Jr. =

American politician

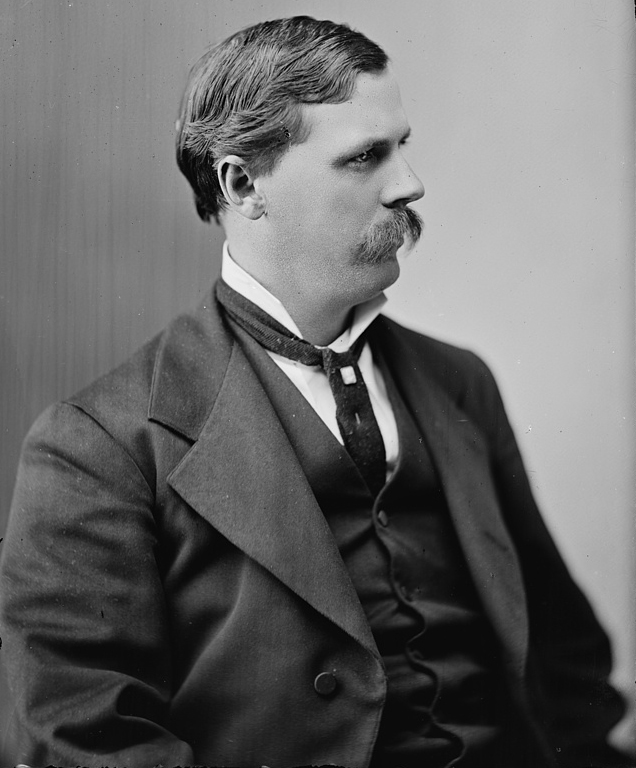

Member of the U.S. House of Representatives from Kentucky's 8th district
- In office March 4, 1879 – March 3, 1885
- Preceded by: Milton J. Durham
- Succeeded by: James B. McCreary

Personal details
- Born: October 15, 1845 Harrodsburg, Kentucky
- Died: December 15, 1909 (aged 64) Washington, D. C.
- Resting place: Spring Hill Cemetery
- Party: Democratic
- Relations: Maria T. Daviess (aunt)
- Education: University of Kentucky
- Profession: Lawyer

Military service
- Allegiance: Confederate States of America
- Branch/service: Confederate States Army
- Battles/wars: American Civil War

Philip Burton Thompson Jr. (October 15, 1845 – December 15, 1909), nephew of the politician John Burton Thompson Sr., was a U.S. representative from Kentucky.

Born in Harrodsburg, Kentucky, Thompson attended the common schools and the University of Kentucky in Lexington, Kentucky. During the Civil War, he and his twin brother John Burton Thompson Jr. entered the Confederate States Army at the age of sixteen and served throughout the war. He studied law, was admitted to the bar in 1866, and commenced practice in Harrodsburg. He was city attorney of Harrodsburg from 1867 to 1869. In 1869, he was appointed Commonwealth attorney for the thirteenth judicial district of Kentucky. He was subsequently elected and served until 1874. He was reelected in 1874 and served until 1878, when he resigned, having been elected to Congress.

Thompson was elected as a Democrat to the Forty-sixth, Forty-seventh, and Forty-eighth Congresses (March 4, 1879 – March 3, 1885). He served as chairman of the Committee on Expenditures in the Department of War (Forty-eighth Congress). In 1883, he fatally shot his wife Martha's alleged lover, Walter H. Davis (who had supposedly seduced her with alcohol), on a train near Harrodsburg. (The couple had two children, Garnett [1868-1899], and Martha, known as Mattie [1872-1922].) He served as delegate to the 1884 Democratic National Convention. He moved to New York City and resumed the practice of law. He died in Washington, D.C., December 15, 1909 and was interred in Spring Hill Cemetery, Harrodsburg, Kentucky.

U.S. House of Representatives
Preceded by Milton J. Durham	Member of the U.S. House of Representatives from Kentucky's 8th congressional district 1879 – 1885	Succeeded by James B. McCreary
