= John McConnell Rice =

American politician

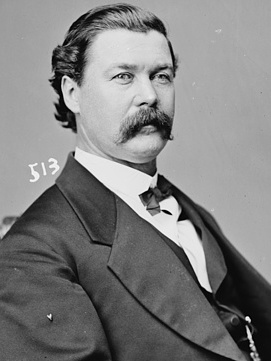
- Rice, c. 1869–73

Member of the U.S. House of Representatives from Kentucky's 9th district
- In office March 4, 1869 – March 3, 1873
- Preceded by: Samuel McKee
- Succeeded by: George Madison Adams

Member of the Kentucky House of Representatives
- In office August 5, 1867 – March 3, 1869
- Preceded by: D. J. Burchett (Note: As the representative from Boyd and Lawrence Counties.)
- Succeeded by: George R. Diamond
- Constituency: Lawrence County
- In office August 1, 1859 – August 5, 1861
- Preceded by: Robert Bates
- Succeeded by: David May (Note: As the representative from Letcher and Pike Counties.)
- Constituency: Letcher, Perry, and Pike Counties

Personal details
- Born: February 19, 1831 Prestonsburg, Kentucky
- Died: September 18, 1895 (aged 64) Louisa, Kentucky
- Resting place: Pine Hill Cemetery
- Party: Democratic
- Profession: Lawyer

John McConnell Rice (February 19, 1831 – September 18, 1895) was a United States representative from Kentucky.

== Biography ==
He was born in Prestonsburg, Kentucky where he received a limited schooling. He graduated from a Louisville law school in 1852, was admitted to the bar in 1853, and commenced practice in Pikeville.

Rice was the superintendent of schools of Pike County in 1854 and was then elected prosecuting attorney of Pike County in 1856. He served as a member of the Kentucky House of Representatives in 1858 before moving to Louisa in 1860. He was again a member of the Kentucky House of Representatives in 1861.

Rice was elected as a Democrat to the Forty-first and Forty-second Congresses (March 4, 1869 – March 3, 1873) but was not a candidate for renomination in 1872. Rice and John T. Zeigler disputed the November 1868 election, and the seat was vacant while in dispute. After leaving Congress, he resumed the practice of law in Louisa and was appointed judge of the Lawrence County criminal court in 1883 and was elected to the same office in 1884. He was reelected in 1890 and served until his death in Louisa in 1895. He was buried in Pine Hill Cemetery.

== Notes ==
U.S. House of Representatives
Preceded by Samuel McKee	Member of the U.S. House of Representatives from Kentucky's 9th congressional district 1869 – 1873	Succeeded by George M. Adams
