= Ira G. Grover =

American lawyer

Ira Glanton Grover
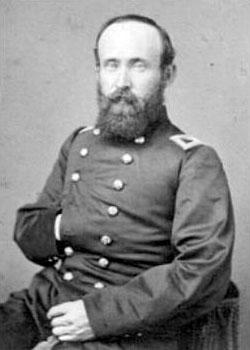
- Born: December 26, 1832; Brownsville, Indiana, US
- Died: May 30, 1876 (aged 43); Greensburg, Indiana, US
- Burial place: South Park Cemetery, Greensburg, Indiana, US
- Education: Indiana Asbury University
- Military career
- Allegiance: United States (Union)
- Branch: United States Army (Union Army)
- Service years: 1861–1864
- Rank: Colonel; Bvt. brigadier general
- Commands: 7th Indiana Infantry Regiment
- Conflicts: American Civil War: Western Virginia campaign; Battle of Corrick's Ford; Jackson's Valley campaign; Battle of Port Republic; Maryland campaign; Battle of Antietam; Gettysburg campaign; Battle of Gettysburg; Overland Campaign; Battle of the Wilderness (POW)

Ira Glanton Grover (1832–1876) was an American Brevet Brigadier General and attorney who commanded the 7th Indiana Infantry Regiment during the American Civil War, as well as a member of the Indiana House of Representatives before the outbreak of the war.

== Biography ==
=== Early life ===
Grover was born on December 26, 1832, at Brownsville, Indiana, as the son of Ira Grover and Elizabeth Glanton. On 1839, his father moved to Greensburg, Indiana, where Grover would spend time attempting to pursue various interests. At the age of 19, he began attending Indiana Asbury University and graduated in 1856 with high honors. He briefly served as a teacher at the university before becoming an attorney there. In 1860, Grover was nominated to be a member of the Indiana House of Representatives and was elected with a majority vote of 731 and remained there until the outbreak of the American Civil War. During his pre-war life, Grover was described as being energetic, industrious and persevering as well as a kind friend and a faithful public servant.

=== American Civil War ===
Grover enlisted in the 7th Indiana Infantry Regiment as captain of Company E for a term of 3 years. He first saw active combat at the Battle of Port Republic but was wounded during the fighting, afterwards returned to the regiment and was promoted to major. Grover also participated at the Battle of Antietam as a part of the 2nd Brigade of the 1st Division, of the I Corps.

In early 1863 he was promoted to lieutenant colonel and led the 7th Indiana into the Gettysburg campaign, where he was wounded again. During the battle, he was stationed at Emmitsburg, Maryland, to guard the town's trains while he waited for George J. Stannard's 9th Vermont Infantry Regiment, but when the 9th Vermont hadn't arrived by 10 am, Grover and the 7th Indiana went to Culp's Hill to reinforce the Iron Brigade. Grover then faced a court-martial for abandoning his post at Emmitsburg but was exonerated. He then participated in the Battle of the Wilderness but was captured during the fighting and was held as a prisoner of war at Macon, Georgia, before being released on August 3, 1864, as part of a prisoner exchange. However, by September 3, Grover and the 7th Indiana's term of service had ended and they were mustered out of service by September 20. On March 13, 1865, Grover received a brevet promotion to brigadier general for "gallant and meritorious services at the battles of Corrick's Ford and the Wilderness, Va."

== See also ==
- List of American Civil War brevet generals (Union)
