= George Madison Adams =

American politician (1837–1920)

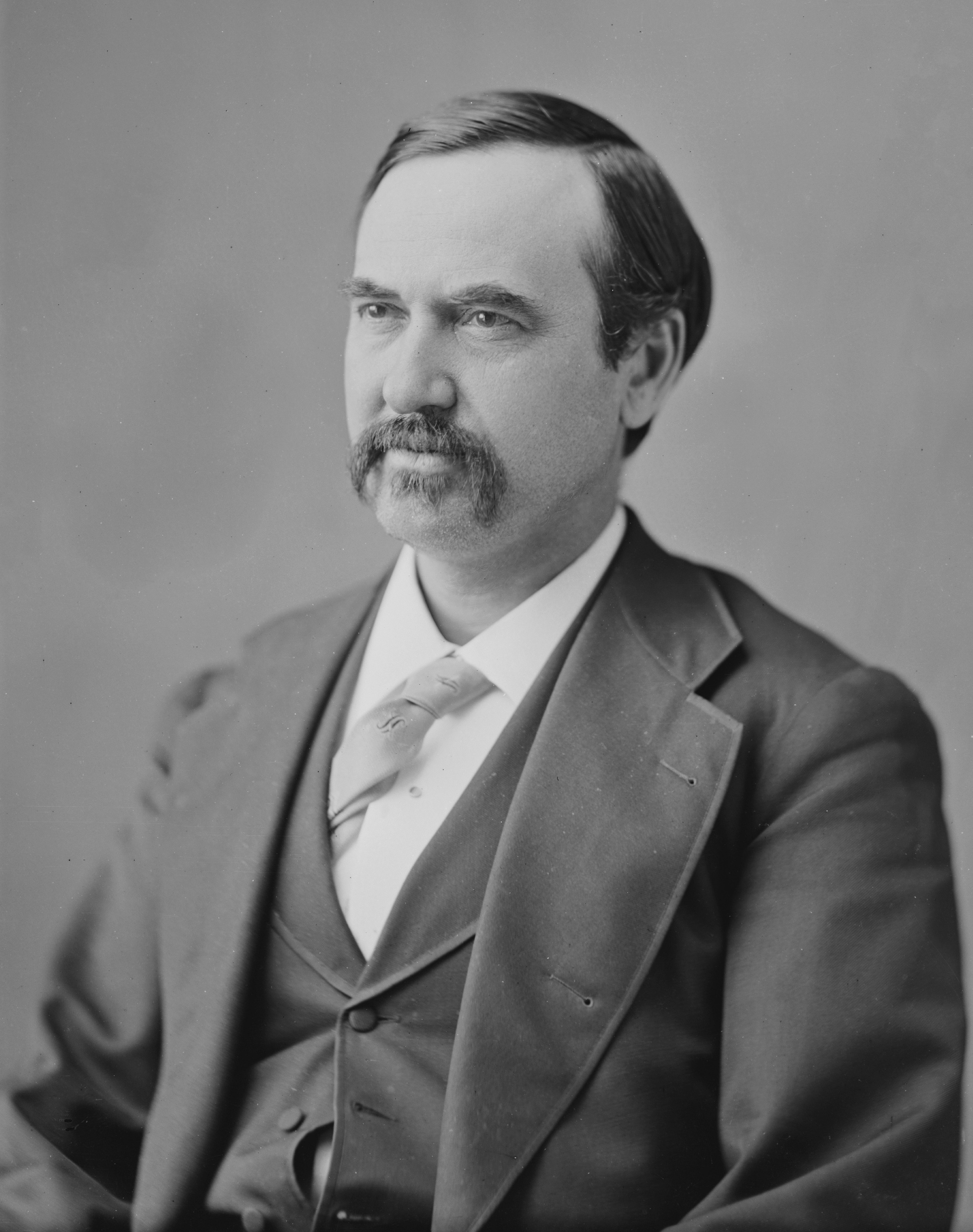
- Adams, 1865–1880

Member of the Kentucky Railroad Commission from the 3rd District
- In office August 25, 1891 – May 18, 1892
- Governor: Simon Bolivar Buckner; John Y. Brown
- Preceded by: John F. Hager
- Succeeded by: Charles B. Poyntz

49th Secretary of State of Kentucky
- In office September 3, 1887 – August 25, 1891
- Governor: Simon Bolivar Buckner
- Preceded by: James A. McKenzie
- Succeeded by: Willis Ringo

Register of the Kentucky Land Office
- In office March 3, 1884 – September 3, 1887
- Governor: J. Proctor Knott
- Preceded by: John G. Cecil
- Succeeded by: Thomas H. Corbett

21st Clerk of the United States House of Representatives
- In office December 6, 1875 – December 5, 1881
- Speaker: Michael C. Kerr Samuel J. Randall
- Preceded by: Edward McPherson
- Succeeded by: Edward McPherson

Member of the U.S. House of Representatives from Kentucky
- In office March 4, 1867 – March 3, 1875
- Preceded by: William H. Randall (8th); John M. Rice (9th)
- Succeeded by: Milton J. Durham (8th); John D. White (9th)
- Constituency: 8th district (1867-73); 9th district (1873-75)

Personal details
- Born: December 20, 1837 Barbourville, Kentucky, U.S.
- Died: April 6, 1920 (aged 82) Winchester, Kentucky, U.S.
- Resting place: Lexington Cemetery
- Party: Democratic
- Relations: Nephew of Green Adams
- Education: Centre College
- Profession: Lawyer

Military service
- Allegiance: United States; Union
- Branch/service: United States Army; Union Army
- Rank: Captain
- Unit: Company H, 7th Kentucky Infantry Regiment
- Battles/wars: American Civil War

George Madison Adams (December 20, 1837 – April 6, 1920) was a U.S. representative from Kentucky, nephew of Green Adams, and slaveowner.

== Early years ==
Adams was born in Barbourville, Knox County, Kentucky, on December 20, 1837. He received private instruction from his father and studied law at Centre College in Danville, Kentucky, but did not graduate. He served as clerk of the circuit court of Knox County, from 1859 to 1861.

During the Civil War, he enlisted in the Union army, raised a company of volunteers and was captain of Company H, 7th Kentucky Infantry Regiment, from 1861 to 1863. In 1863 he was appointed additional paymaster of volunteers with the rank of captain, serving until 1865.

He was a slaveowner, as was his son.

== Career ==
Adams was elected as a Democrat to the Fortieth and to the three succeeding Congresses from March 4, 1867, to March 3, 1875 (41st, 42nd and 43rd congresses). He was an unsuccessful candidate for reelection in 1874 to the Forty-fourth Congress.

Adams was elected Clerk of the House of Representatives on December 6, 1875, during the Forty-fourth Congress, and served until the commencement of the Forty-seventh Congress, December 5, 1881.

He was appointed register of the Kentucky land office by Governor J. Proctor Knott and served from 1884 to 1887. He was appointed secretary of state for Kentucky by Governor Simon B. Buckner and served from 1887 to 1891. He was appointed Kentucky State railroad commissioner in 1891. He was appointed United States pension agent at Louisville by President Grover Cleveland and served from 1894 to 1898.

== Last years ==
After retirement he resided at Winchester, Clark County, Kentucky, until his death April 6, 1920. He was interred at Lexington Cemetery at Lexington, Kentucky.

== Sources ==
- United States Congress. "George Madison Adams (id: A000035)". Biographical Directory of the United States Congress. This article incorporates public domain material from Biographical Directory of the United States Congress. Federal government of the United States.

U.S. House of Representatives
Preceded by William H. Randall	Member of the U.S. House of Representatives from Kentucky's 8th congressional district 1867 – 1873	Succeeded by Milton J. Durham
Preceded by John M. Rice	Member of the U.S. House of Representatives from Kentucky's 9th congressional district 1873 – 1875	Succeeded by John D. White
Government offices
Preceded by Edward McPherson	Clerk of the United States House of Representatives; 1875–1881	Succeeded by Edward McPherson
Political offices
Preceded by James A. McKenzie	Secretary of State of Kentucky; 1887–1891	Succeeded by Willis R. Ringo
