= William H. Randall =

American politician

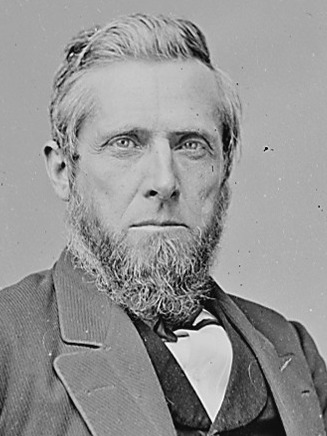

Member of the U.S. House of Representatives from Kentucky's 8th district
- In office March 4, 1863 – March 3, 1867
- Preceded by: John J. Crittenden
- Succeeded by: George Madison Adams

Personal details
- Born: July 15, 1812 Madison County, Kentucky
- Died: August 1, 1881 (aged 69) London, Kentucky
- Party: Union Democratic (1863–64); Unconditional Union (1864–67)
- Profession: Lawyer
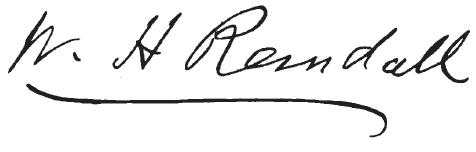
- Signature

William Harrison Randall (July 15, 1812 – August 1, 1881) was a U.S. representative from Kentucky.

Born near Richmond, Kentucky, Randall completed preparatory studies. He studied law. He was admitted to the bar and commenced practice in London, Kentucky, in 1835. He served as clerk of the circuit court and county court of Laurel County 1836–1844.

Randall was elected as a Union Democrat to the Thirty-eighth Congress and as an Unconditional Unionist to the Thirty-ninth Congress, serving from March 4, 1863, to March 4, 1867. He served as district judge of the fifteenth Kentucky district 1870–1880. On August 1, 1881, he died in London, Kentucky, and was interred at his family's cemetery therein.

U.S. House of Representatives
Preceded by John J. Crittenden	Member of the U.S. House of Representatives from Kentucky's 8th congressional district 1863 – 1867	Succeeded by George M. Adams
