= John Duncan Young =

American politician

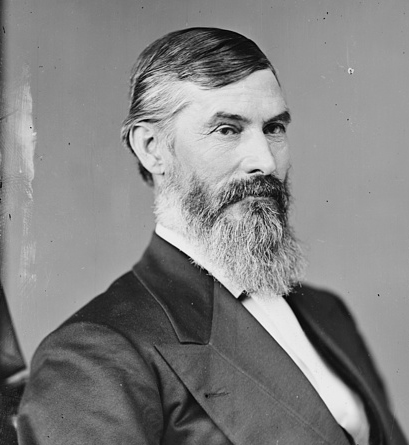

Member of the U.S. House of Representatives from Kentucky's 10th district
- In office March 4, 1873 – March 3, 1875
- Preceded by: New district
- Succeeded by: John Blades Clarke

Personal details
- Born: September 22, 1823 Owingsville, Kentucky
- Died: December 26, 1910 (aged 87) Mount Sterling, Kentucky
- Resting place: Machpelah Cemetery
- Party: Democratic
- Profession: Lawyer

John Duncan Young (September 22, 1823 – December 26, 1910) was a U.S. representative from Kentucky.

Born in Owingsville, Kentucky, Young attended the common schools. He studied law, was admitted to the bar in 1854 and practiced in Owingsville, Kentucky, and later engaged in agricultural pursuits. He was acting marshal of Kentucky during the administration of President Franklin Pierce.

Young was elected judge of the quarterly court of Bath County in 1858 and served four years. Young was again elected in 1866 and served until 1867 when he resigned having been elected to Congress. He presented credentials as a Member-elect to the Fortieth Congress in 1867, but was not permitted to qualify as his campaign used fraud and voter intimidation to get him elected. A Congressional inquiry found that hundreds of ex-rebel soldiers, disqualified for treason against the State of Kentucky, fraudulently voted. This was enough to overturn his victory and hand the seat to Samuel McKee. Evidence of voter intimidation by ex-rebel guerrillas and other pro-slavery elements was collected as well. Partisan Young gunmen watched polling precincts across Eastern Kentucky to make sure not a single black man voted in the Ninth District and intimidate Republican voters in general.

Young was elected as a Democrat to the Forty-third Congress (March 4, 1873 – March 3, 1875). He was not a candidate for renomination in 1874. He resumed agricultural pursuits. State railroad commissioner of Kentucky 1884–1889. He again served as judge of the quarterly court of Bath County 1890–1895. He died in Mount Sterling, Kentucky, December 26, 1910. He was interred in Machpelah Cemetery.

Young owned slaves.

U.S. House of Representatives
Preceded by John W. Menzies	Member of the U.S. House of Representatives from Kentucky's 10th congressional district March 4, 1873 – March 3, 1875 (obsolete district)	Succeeded by John B. Clarke
