= 1864–65 United States House of Representatives elections =

House elections for the 39th U.S. Congress

- June 5, 1864– November 7, 1865 (Note: Excluding special elections and states admitted after the start of Congress.)

All 192 (Note: Including late elections.) (Note: An additional 50 seats were vacant as a result of Reconstruction.) seats in the United States House of Representatives 97 seats needed for a majority
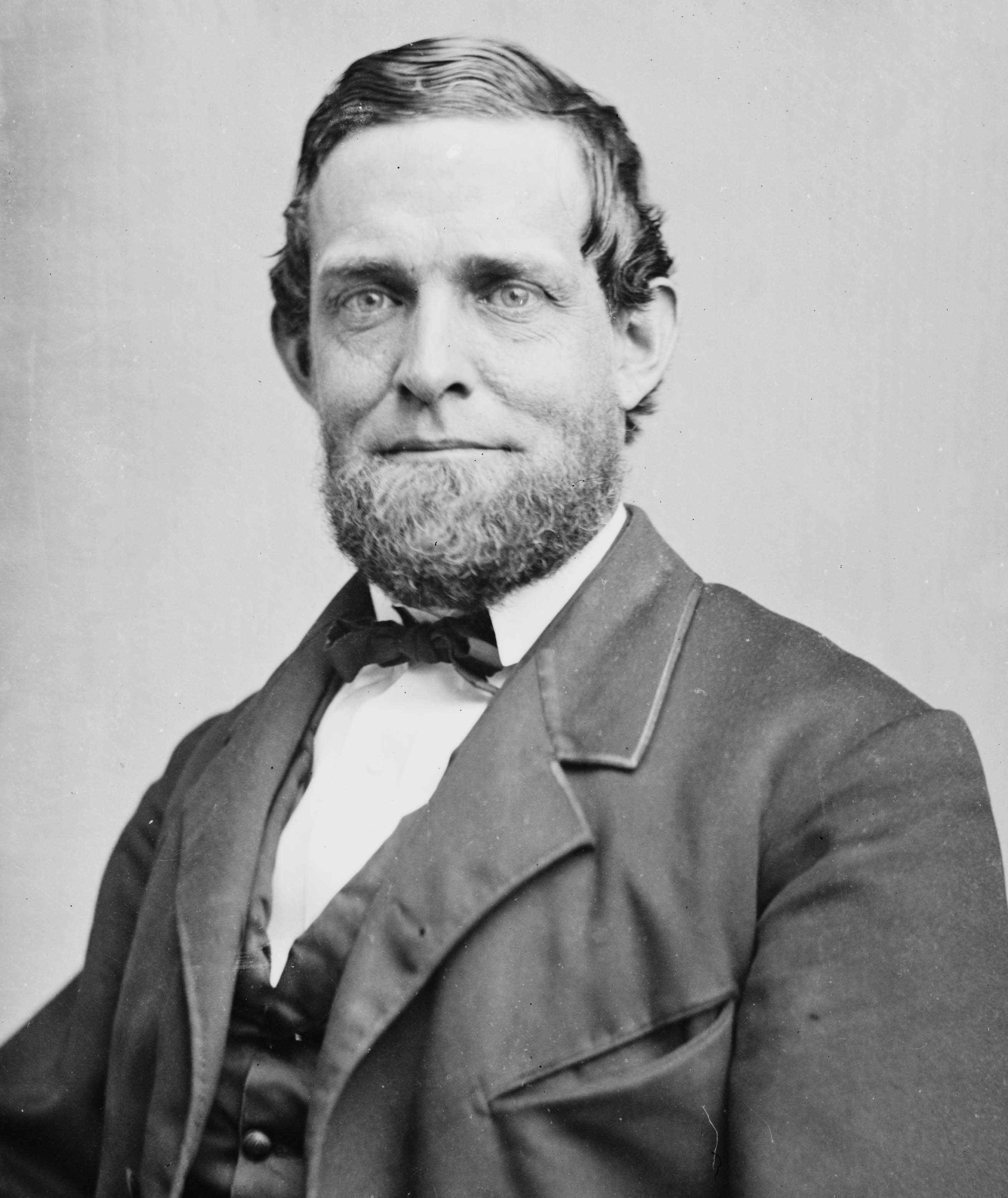

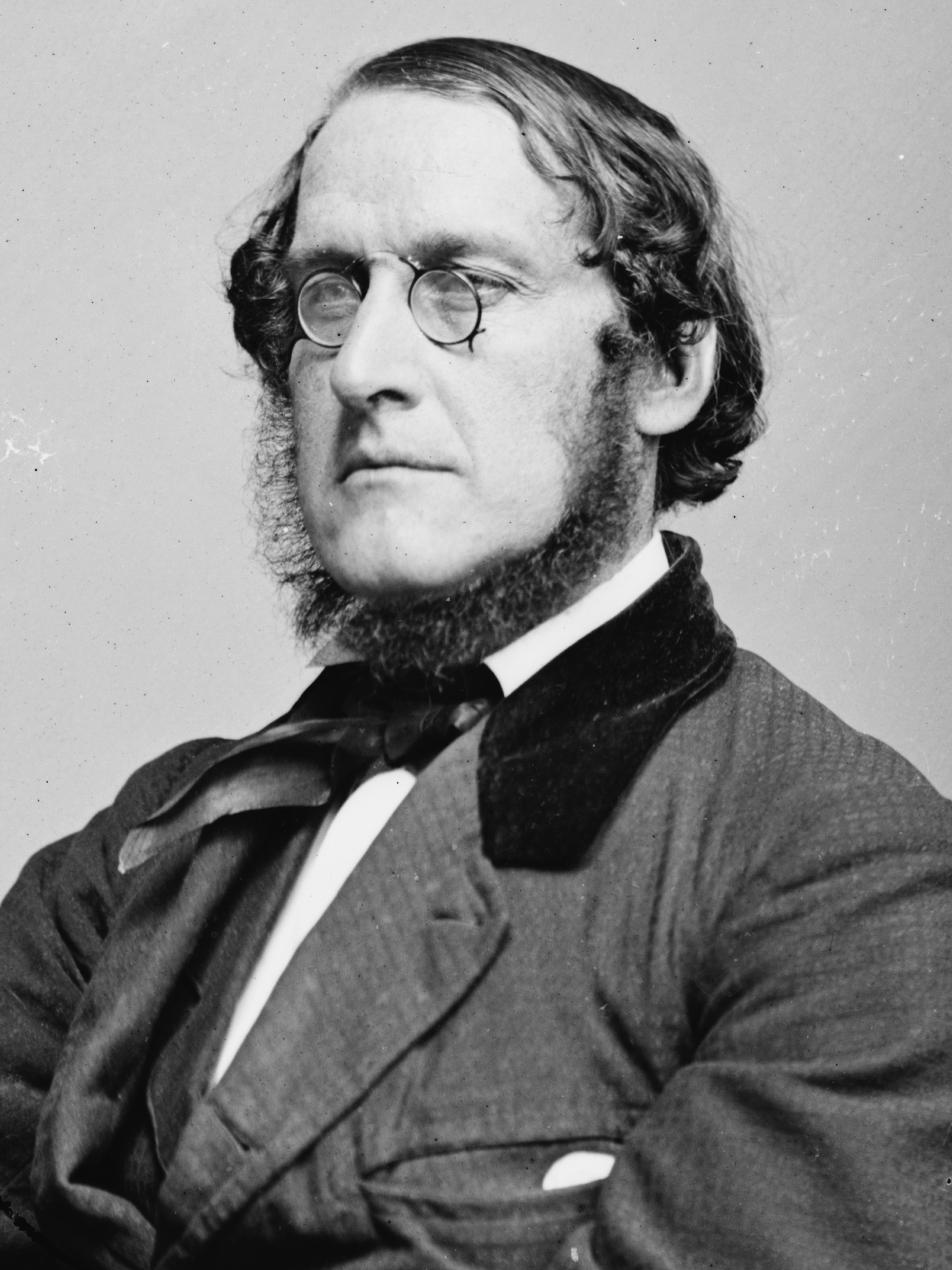
	Majority party	Minority party
Leader	Schuyler Colfax	James Brooks
Party	National Union	Democratic
Leader's seat	Indiana 9th	New York 8th
Last election	99 seats, 50.32% (Note: Combined result for Republican–Union and Unconditional Union candidates in the last election.)	73 seats, 44.48%
Seats won	147	35
Seat change	▲48	▼38
Popular vote	2,131,978	1,620,556
Percentage	55.00%	41.81%
Swing	▲4.68 pp	▼2.67 pp
	Third party	Fourth party
Party	Conservative	Independent
Last election	1 seat, 0.31%	2 seats (Note: Including 1 Independent Unionist and 1 War Democrat.), 1.04%
Seats won	9	1 (Note: Including 1 Independent Unionist, John R. Kelso, elected from Missouri's 4th congressional district.)
Seat change	▲8	▼1
Popular vote	88,474	25,631 (Note: Including all votes for Independents, Independent Unionists, and Independent Democrats.)
Percentage	2.28%	0.7%
Swing	▲1.97 pp	▼0.66 pp
- Results; Union gain Democratic gain Radical gain Union hold Democratic hold Radical hold Conservative gain Independent gain
Speaker before election
Schuyler Colfax
Republican–Union
Elected Speaker
Schuyler Colfax
National Union

The 1864–65 United States House of Representatives elections were held between June 5, 1864, and November 7, 1865, to elect the 192 members and nine non-voting delegates of the House of Representatives. The National Union Party expanded their existing majority against the backdrop of the American Civil War.

Candidates listed as Republicans and Unionists won 99 seats in congressional elections held in 1862 and 1863; two Union Democrats and the lone Unconditional Union Democrat from Kentucky subsequently crossed the floor to give the Republican–Union coalition a narrow majority during the 38th United States Congress. The wartime coalition of Republicans, War Democrats, and border state unionists became the base for the National Union Party that held its national convention at Baltimore on June 7, 1864. Leading Unionists were pessimistic about their party's prospects during the summer of 1864, but the fall of Atlanta led to a dramatic reversal of fortunes ahead of the fall elections. The Union Party won a "sweeping victory" at the polls, carrying all but three states in the concurrent presidential election.

Unionists significantly improved their showing compared to the last elections, contributing three-quarters of the members of the 39th United States Congress. A majority of the members elected from Indiana and all but two from Ohio were Unionists. In Kentucky, Missouri, and Tennessee, the elections were contested by Radical and Conservative Unionist factions, resulting in 15 Radical or Unconditional Unionists, 9 Conservatives, and 1 Independent Unionist elected to the 39th United States Congress.

Following the Confederate surrender, the former Confederate state held congressional elections in 1865 and 1866, but only the members from Tennessee were seated by the House. The 10 remaining states were eventually readmitted between 1868 and 1870 during the 40th and 41st United States Congresses.

== Results ==
=== Federal ===
↓
35	9	1	147
Democratic	Con	(Note: 1 Independent Unionist was elected.)	National Union

1864–65 United States House of Representatives elections (Note: Not including rejected elections in Alabama, Arkansas, Florida, Georgia, Louisiana, Mississippi, North Carolina, South Carolina, Texas, and Virginia.)
Parties	Seats				Popular vote	
Parties	1862–63	1864–65	±	%	Votes	%
National Union Party	99	147	▲48	76.56	2,131,978	55.00
Democratic Party	73	35	▼38	18.23	1,620,556	41.81
Conservative Party	1	9	▲8	4.69	88,474	2.28
Independent Unionists	1	1	Steady	0.52	9,409	0.24
Union Party (Kansas)	0	0	Steady	0.00	9,712	0.25
Independent Democrats	0	0	Steady	0.00	1,006	0.03
Others	9	0	▼9	0.00	15,216	0.39
Total	183	192	▲9	100.00	3,876,351	100.00

=== Results by state ===
State	Type	Date	Total seats	Democratic		Conservative		National Union		Others	
State	Type	Date	Total seats	Seats	Change	Seats	Change	Seats	Change	Seats	Change
Oregon	At-large	June 5, 1864	1	0	Steady	0	Steady	1	Steady	0	Steady
Vermont	District	September 6, 1864	3	0	Steady	0	Steady	3	Steady	0	Steady
Maine	District	September 11, 1864	5	0	▼1	0	Steady	5	▲1	0	Steady
Indiana	District	October 10, 1864	11	3	▼4	0	Steady	8	▲4	0	Steady
Ohio	District	October 10, 1864	19	2	▼12	0	Steady	17	▲12	0	Steady
Pennsylvania	District	October 10, 1864	24	8	▼4	0	Steady	16	▲4	0	Steady
West Virginia	District	October 22, 1864	3	0	Steady	0	Steady	3	Steady	0	Steady
California	District	November 8, 1864 (Election Day) (Note: In 1845, Congress passed a law providing for a uniform date for choosing presidential electors (see: Statutes at Large, 28th Congress, 2nd Session, p. 721). Congressional elections were unaffected by this law, but the date was gradually adopted by the states for congressional elections as well.)	3	0	Steady	0	Steady	3	Steady	0	Steady
Delaware	At-large	November 8, 1864 (Election Day)	1	1	Steady	0	Steady	0	Steady	0	Steady
Illinois	Mixed (Note: 13 single-member districts and 1 at-large seat)	November 8, 1864 (Election Day)	14	3	▼6	0	Steady	11	▲6	0	Steady
Iowa	District	November 8, 1864 (Election Day)	6	0	Steady	0	Steady	6	Steady	0	Steady
Kansas	At-large	November 8, 1864 (Election Day)	1	0	Steady	0	Steady	1	Steady	0	Steady
Maryland	District	November 8, 1864 (Election Day)	5	2	▲1	0	Steady	3	▼1	0	Steady
Massachusetts	District	November 8, 1864 (Election Day)	10	0	Steady	0	Steady	10	Steady	0	Steady
Michigan	District	November 8, 1864 (Election Day)	6	0	▼1	0	Steady	6	▲1	0	Steady
Minnesota	District	November 8, 1864 (Election Day)	2	0	Steady	0	Steady	2	Steady	0	Steady
Missouri	District	November 8, 1864 (Election Day)	9	1	▼1	0	▼1	8 (Note: Including 1 Independent Unionist.)	▲2	0	Steady
New Jersey	District	November 8, 1864 (Election Day)	5	3	▼1	0	Steady	2	▲1	0	Steady
New York	District	November 8, 1864 (Election Day)	31	11	▼6	0	Steady	20	▲6	0	Steady
Wisconsin	District	November 8, 1864 (Election Day)	6	1	▼2	0	Steady	5	▲2	0	Steady
Late elections (after the March 4, 1865 beginning of the term)
New Hampshire	District	March 14, 1865	3	0	▼1	0	Steady	3	▲1	0	Steady
Connecticut	District	April 3, 1865	4	0	▼1	0	Steady	4	▲1	0	Steady
Tennessee	District	August 3, 1865	8	0	Steady	4	▲4	4	▲4	0	Steady
Rhode Island	District	April 5, 1865	2	0	Steady	0	Steady	2	Steady	0	Steady
Kentucky	District	August 7, 1865	9	0	Steady	5	▲5	4	▲3	0	▼8 (Note: Union Democrats)
Nevada	At-large	November 7, 1865	1	0	Steady	0	Steady	1	Steady	0	Steady
Seceded states not yet readmitted
Alabama	District	November 6, 1865	6								
Arkansas	District	October 9, 1865	3								
Florida	At-large	November 29, 1865	1								
Georgia	District	November 15, 1865	7								
Louisiana	District	November 6, 1865	5								
Mississippi	District	October 2, 1865	5								
North Carolina	District	November 9, 1865	7								
South Carolina	District	November 22, 1865	4								
Texas	District	October 15, 1866	4								
Virginia	District	October 12, 1865	8								
Total			192	35	▼38	9	▲8	148	▲48	0	▼8
Total			192	18.2%		4.7%		77.1%		0.0%	

Popular vote
National Union	55.0%
Democratic	41.8%
Conservative	2.3%
Union (Kansas)	0.2%
Other	0.7%

House seats
National Union	76.6%
Democratic	18.2%
Conservative	4.7%
Independent Unionists	0.5%

=== Maps ===
Vacant seats filled by late and special elections in 1864

Seats elected in 1864

Seats elected in 1865

Winner's share of the popular vote

== New seats ==
One seat was allocated to Nevada upon its admission on October 31, 1864, increasing the size of the House to 242 seats and the number of recognized members to 184. Eight vacancies were filled by the readmission of Tennessee, the first Confederate state to be readmitted, increasing the number of recognized members to 192; 50 members elected from nine former Confederate states in 1864 or 1865 were not seated by the House.

== Special elections ==
=== 38th Congress ===
District	Incumbent			This race	
District	Member	Party	First elected	Results	Candidates
Illinois 5	Owen Lovejoy	Republican– Union	1856	Incumbent died March 25, 1864. New member elected May 19, 1864. Union hold.	▌ ✓ Ebon C. Ingersoll (Union) 62.91%; ▌H. M. Wead (Democratic) 37.09%
New York 1	Henry G. Stebbins	Democratic	1862	Incumbent resigned October 24, 1864. New member elected November 8, 1864. Democratic hold.	▌ ✓ Dwight Townsend (Democratic) 54.92%; ▌Henry G. Stebbins (Union) 45.08%

=== 39th Congress ===
District	Incumbent			This race	
District	Member	Party	First elected	Results	Candidates
Maryland 2	Edwin H. Webster	Union	1859	Incumbent resigned July 1865. New member elected November 7, 1865. Union hold.	▌ ✓ John L. Thomas (Union) 83.21%; ▌William Kimmell (Democratic) 16.79%
Massachusetts 6	Daniel W. Gooch	Union	1858 (special)	Incumbent resigned September 1, 1865. New member elected November 7, 1865. Union hold.	▌ ✓ Nathaniel P. Banks (Union) 80.75%; ▌Thomas J. Greenwood (Democratic) 19.25%
New York 16	Orlando Kellogg	Union	1862	Incumbent died August 24, 1865. New member elected November 7, 1865. Union hold.	▌ ✓ Robert S. Hale (Union) 54.45%; ▌Halsey R. Wing (Democratic) 45.55%

== Alabama ==
Alabama held elections on November 6, 1865, following the end of the Civil War, but the winners were not seated by the House.

District	Incumbent			This race	
District	Member	Party	First elected	Results	Candidates
Alabama 1	Vacant			Seat vacant since January 12, 1861. Winner not seated.	▌ ✓ Charles C. Langdon (Unknown) 63.84%; ▌Thomas J. Matthews (Unknown) 21.93%; ▌S. B. Cleveland (Unknown) 14.23%
Alabama 2	Vacant			Seat vacant since January 12, 1861. Winner not seated.	▌ ✓ George C. Freeman (Unknown) 82.86%; ▌Benjamin Gardiner (Unknown) 17.14%
Alabama 3	Vacant			Seat vacant since January 12, 1861. Winner not seated.	▌ ✓ Cullen A. Battle (Unknown) 43.80%; ▌George Reese (Unknown) 23.40%; ▌Robert F. Lyon (Unknown) 22.32%; ▌E. J. Hamil (Unknown) 6.40%; ▌John H. Cadenhead (Unknown) 4.09%
Alabama 4	Vacant			Seat vacant since January 12, 1861. Winner not seated.	▌ ✓ Joseph W. Taylor (Unknown) 62.23%; ▌Columbus W. Lee (Unknown) 37.77%
Alabama 5	Vacant			Seat vacant since January 12, 1861. Winner not seated.	▌ ✓ Burrwell Pope (Unknown) 39.00%; ▌James M. Shield (Unknown) 38.64%; ▌J. R. Morris (Unknown) 19.64%; ▌A. C. Bryan (Unknown) 1.12%; ▌John Murrell (Unknown) 0.89%; ▌A. B. Condit (Unknown) 0.72%
Alabama 6	Vacant			Seat vacant since January 12, 1861. Winner not seated.	▌ ✓ Thomas J. Foster (Unknown) 58.58%; ▌C. C. Sheets (Unknown) 33.10%; ▌Jesse J. Garth (Unknown) 8.32

== Arizona Territory ==
See Non-voting delegates, below.

== Arkansas ==
Arkansas held successive elections in 1864 and 1865 to fill vacancies in the 38th Congress and elect representatives to the 39th Congress.

=== 38th Congress ===
Arkansas did not hold elections for the 38th Congress in 1862 or 1863. Late elections were held from March 14–16, 1864, but the winners were not seated by the House.

District	Incumbent			This race	
District	Member	Party	First elected	Results	Candidates
Arkansas 1	Vacant			Seat vacant since May 6, 1861. Winner not seated.	▌ ✓ T. M. Jacks (Unknown)
Arkansas 2	Vacant			Seat vacant since May 6, 1861. Winner not seated.	▌ ✓ Anthony A. C. Rogers (Unknown)
Arkansas 3	Vacant			Seat vacant since May 6, 1861. Winner not seated.	▌ ✓ James M. Johnson (Unknown)

=== 39th Congress ===
Arkansas held elections for the 39th Congress on October 9, 1865, following the end of the Civil War, but the winners were not seated by the House.

District	Incumbent			This race	
District	Member	Party	First elected	Results	Candidates
Arkansas 1	Vacant			Seat vacant since May 6, 1861. Winner not seated.	▌ ✓ William Byers (Unknown); ▌T. M. Jacks (Unknown)
Arkansas 2	Vacant			Seat vacant since May 6, 1861. Winner not seated.	▌ ✓ G. H. Kyle (Unknown); ▌John H. Askew (Unknown); ▌Lorenzo Gibson (Unknown); ▌C. V. Meador (Unknown)
Arkansas 3	Vacant			Seat vacant since May 6, 1861. Winner not seated.	▌ ✓ James M. Johnson (Unknown); ▌John T. Loudon (Unknown)

== California ==
California held elections on November 8, 1864.

District	Incumbent			This race	
District	Member	Party	First elected	Results	Candidates
California 1 New seat	Cornelius Cole; Redistricted from the at-large district.	Republican– Union	1863	Incumbent retired. Union hold.	▌ ✓ Donald C. McRuer (Union) 58.93%; ▌Joseph B. Crockett (Democratic) 41.07%
California 2 New seat	William Higby; Redistricted from the at-large district.	Republican– Union	1863	Incumbent re-elected.	▌ ✓ William Higby (Union) 61.62%; ▌James W. Coffroth (Democratic) 38.38%
California 3 New seat	Thomas B. Shannon; Redistricted from the at-large district.	Republican– Union	1863	Incumbent lost renomination. Union hold.	▌ ✓ John Bidwell (Union) 56.12%; ▌Jack Temple (Democratic) 43.88%

== Colorado Territory ==
See non-voting delegates, below.

== Connecticut ==
Connecticut held elections on April 3, 1865, after the start of the term but before Congress convened.

District	Incumbent			This race	
District	Member	Party	First elected	Results	Candidates
Connecticut 1	Henry C. Deming	Republican– Union	1863	Incumbent re-elected.	▌ ✓ Henry C. Deming (Union) 56.93%; ▌Henry A. Mitchell (Democratic) 43.07%
Connecticut 2	James E. English	Democratic	1861	Incumbent retired. Union gain.	▌ ✓ Samuel L. Warner (Union) 54.13%; ▌Edward A. Russell (Democratic) 45.87%
Connecticut 3	Augustus Brandegee	Republican– Union	1863	Incumbent re-elected.	▌ ✓ Augustus Brandegee (Union) 66.33%; ▌Frederick L. Allan (Democratic) 33.67%
Connecticut 4	John H. Hubbard	Republican– Union	1863	Incumbent re-elected.	▌ ✓ John H. Hubbard (Union) 56.32%; ▌William F. Taylor (Democratic) 43.68%

== Dakota Territory ==
See non-voting delegates, below.

== Delaware ==
Delaware held elections on November 8, 1864.

District	Incumbent			This race	
District	Member	Party	First elected	Results	Candidates
Delaware at-large	Nathaniel B. Smithers	Republican– Union	1863 (special)	Incumbent lost re-election. Democratic gain.	▌ ✓ John A. Nicholson (Democratic) 51.50%; ▌Nathaniel B. Smithers (Union) 48.50%

== Florida ==
Florida held elections on November 29, 1865, following the end of the Civil War, but the winners were not seated by the House.

District	Incumbent			This race	
District	Member	Party	First elected	Results	Candidates
Florida at-large	Vacant			Seat vacant since January 10, 1861. Winner not seated.	▌ ✓ Ferdinand McLeod (Unknown) 43.41%; ▌D. P. Hogue (Unknown) 29.37%; ▌J. W. Culpepper (Unknown) 10.26%; ▌W. M. Ives (Unknown) 4.71%; ▌W. H. Anson (Unknown) 2.91%; ▌J. F. Johnston (Unknown) 2.79%; ▌John W. Price (Unknown) 2.01%; Scattering 4.50%

== Georgia ==
Georgia held elections on November 15, 1865, following the end of the Civil War, but the winners were not seated by the House.

District	Incumbent			This race	
District	Member	Party	First elected	Results	Candidates (Note: Results from all districts are incomplete.)
Georgia 1	Vacant			Seat vacant since January 19, 1861. Winner not seated.	▌ ✓ Solomon Cohen (Unknown) 84.34%; ▌Carey W. Styles (Unknown) 12.24%; ▌Charles H. Hopkins (Unknown) 3.42%
Georgia 2	Vacant			Seat vacant since January 19, 1861. Winner not seated.	▌ ✓ Philip Cook (Unknown) 93.39%; ▌C. McCay (Unknown) 6.61%; ▌J. E. Blount (Unknown) 0.0%
Georgia 3	Vacant			Seat vacant since January 19, 1861. Winner not seated.	▌ ✓ Hugh Buchanan (Unknown) 50.09%; ▌B. H. Bingham (Unknown) 49.91%
Georgia 4	Vacant			Seat vacant since January 19, 1861. Winner not seated.	▌ ✓ E. G. Cabaniss (Unknown) 87.64%; ▌A. J. Simmons (Unknown) 12.35%; ▌A. J. Murray (Unknown) 0.0%
Georgia 5	Vacant			Seat vacant since January 19, 1861. Winner not seated.	▌ ✓ James D. Matthews (Unknown) 37.68%; ▌John Milledge (Unknown) 38.19%; ▌Garnett Andrews (Unknown) 13.41%; ▌A. Ranse Wright (Unknown) 10.72%
Georgia 6	Vacant			Seat vacant since January 19, 1861. Winner not seated.	▌ ✓ John Christy (Unknown) 59.33%; ▌Junius Hillyer (Unknown) 36.45%; ▌[FNU] Johnson (Unknown) 2.19%; ▌A. T. Lytle (Unknown) 2.04%
Georgia 7	Vacant			Seat vacant since January 19, 1861. Winner not seated.	▌ ✓ William T. Wofford (Unknown) 71.26%; ▌J. P. Hambleton (Unknown) 23.49%; ▌H. G. Cole (Unknown) 5.25%

== Idaho Territory ==
See non-voting delegates, below.

== Illinois ==
Illinois held elections on November 8, 1864.

District	Incumbent			This race	
District	Member	Party	First elected	Results	Candidates
Illinois at-large	James C. Allen	Democratic	1862	Incumbent lost re-election. Union gain.	▌ ✓ Samuel W. Moulton (Union) 54.50%; ▌James C. Allen (Democratic) 45.50%
Illinois 1	Isaac N. Arnold	Republican– Union	1860	Incumbent retired. Union hold.	▌ ✓ John Wentworth (Union) 56.52%; ▌Cyrus McCormick (Democratic) 43.48%
Illinois 2	John F. Farnsworth	Republican– Union	1862	Incumbent re-elected.	▌ ✓ John F. Farnsworth (Union) 77.75%; ▌M. C. Johnson (Democratic) 22.25%
Illinois 3	Elihu B. Washburne	Republican– Union	1852	Incumbent re-elected.	▌ ✓ Elihu B. Washburne (Union) 67.92%; ▌Elias B. Stiles (Democratic) 32.08%
Illinois 4	Charles M. Harris	Democratic	1862	Incumbent lost re-election. Union gain.	▌ ✓ Abner C. Harding (Union) 51.61%; ▌Charles M. Harris (Democratic) 48.39%
Illinois 5	Ebon C. Ingersoll	Republican– Union	1864 (special)	Incumbent re-elected.	▌ ✓ Ebon C. Ingersoll (Union) 61.67%; ▌James C. Echels (Democratic) 38.33%
Illinois 6	Jesse O. Norton	Republican– Union	1862	Incumbent retired. Union hold.	▌ ✓ Burton C. Cook (Union) 60.98%; ▌Samuel K. Casey (Democratic) 39.02%
Illinois 7	John R. Eden	Democratic	1862	Incumbent lost re-election. Union gain.	▌ ✓ Henry P. H. Bromwell (Union) 56.09%; ▌John R. Eden (Democratic) 43.91%
Illinois 8	John T. Stuart	Democratic	1862	Incumbent lost re-election. Union gain.	▌ ✓ Shelby M. Cullom (Union) 52.99%; ▌John T. Stuart (Democratic) 47.01%
Illinois 9	Lewis W. Ross	Democratic	1862	Incumbent re-elected.	▌ ✓ Lewis W. Ross (Democratic) 55.55%; ▌Hugh Fullerton (Union) 44.45%
Illinois 10	Anthony L. Knapp	Democratic	1861 (special)	Incumbent retired. Democratic hold.	▌ ✓ Anthony Thornton (Democratic) 58.13%; ▌N. M. Knapp (Union) 41.87%
Illinois 11	James C. Robinson	Democratic	1858	Incumbent retired. Democratic hold.	▌ ✓ Samuel S. Marshall (Democratic) 60.96%; ▌Ethelbert Callahan (Union) 39.04%
Illinois 12	William R. Morrison	Democratic	1862	Incumbent lost re-election. Union gain.	▌ ✓ Jehu Baker (Union) 50.16%; ▌William R. Morrison (Democratic) 49.84%
Illinois 13	William J. Allen	Democratic	1862 (special)	Incumbent lost re-election. Union gain.	▌ ✓ Andrew J. Kuykendall (Union) 52.18%; ▌William J. Allen (Democratic) 47.82%

== Indiana ==
Indiana held elections on October 10, 1864.

District	Incumbent			This race	
District	Member	Party	First elected	Results	Candidates
Indiana 1	John Law	Democratic	1860	Incumbent retired. Democratic hold.	▌ ✓ William E. Niblack (Democratic) 53.86%; ▌Cyrus M. Allen (Union) 46.14%
Indiana 2	James A. Cravens	Democratic	1860	Incumbent retired. Democratic hold.	▌ ✓ Michael C. Kerr (Democratic) 55.61%; ▌William W. Curry (Union) 44.39%
Indiana 3	Henry W. Harrington	Democratic	1862	Incumbent lost re-election. Union gain.	▌ ✓ Ralph Hill (Union) 51.82%; ▌Henry W. Harrington (Democratic) 48.18%
Indiana 4	William S. Holman	Democratic	1858	Incumbent retired. Union gain.	▌ ✓ John H. Farquhar (Union) 50.17%; ▌George Berry (Democratic) 49.83%
Indiana 5	George W. Julian	Republican– Union	1860	Incumbent re-elected.	▌ ✓ George W. Julian (Union) 68.13%; ▌James Brown (Democratic) 31.87%
Indiana 6	Ebenezer Dumont	Republican– Union	1862	Incumbent re-elected.	▌ ✓ Ebenezer Dumont (Union) 63.41%; ▌John Love (Democratic) 36.59%
Indiana 7	Daniel W. Voorhees	Democratic	1860	Incumbent re-elected. Winner subsequently unseated February 23, 1866, in favor of challenger.	▌ ✓ Daniel W. Voorhees (Democratic) 51.16%; ▌Henry D. Washburn (Union) 48.84%
Indiana 8	Godlove S. Orth	Republican– Union	1862	Incumbent re-elected.	▌ ✓ Godlove S. Orth (Union) 52.29%; ▌James F. Harney (Democratic) 47.71%
Indiana 9	Schuyler Colfax	Republican– Union	1854	Incumbent re-elected.	▌ ✓ Schuyler Colfax (Union) 52.16%; ▌David Turpie (Democratic) 47.84%
Indiana 10	Joseph K. Edgerton	Democratic	1852	Incumbent lost re-election. Union gain.	▌ ✓ Joseph H. Defrees (Union) 51.01%; ▌Joseph K. Edgerton (Democratic) 48.99%
Indiana 11	James F. McDowell	Democratic	1862	Incumbent lost re-election. Union gain.	▌ ✓ Thomas N. Stilwell (Union) 53.86%; ▌James F. McDowell (Democratic) 46.17%

== Iowa ==
Iowa held elections on November 8, 1864.

District	Incumbent			This race	
District	Member	Party	First elected	Results	Candidates
Iowa 1	James F. Wilson	Republican– Union	1862	Incumbent re-elected.	▌ ✓ James F. Wilson (Union) 65.16%; ▌Joseph K. Hornish (Democratic) 34.84%
Iowa 2	Hiram Price	Republican– Union	1862	Incumbent re-elected.	▌ ✓ Hiram Price (Union) 65.26%; ▌Paco H. Parker (Democratic) 34.74%
Iowa 3	William B. Allison	Republican– Union	1862	Incumbent re-elected.	▌ ✓ William B. Allison (Union) 60.41%; ▌B. B. Richards (Democratic) 39.59%
Iowa 4	Josiah B. Grinnell	Republican– Union	1862	Incumbent re-elected.	▌ ✓ Josiah B. Grinnell (Union) 61.79%; ▌Ira C. Mitchell (Democratic) 38.21%
Iowa 5	John A. Kasson	Republican– Union	1862	Incumbent re-elected.	▌ ✓ John A. Kasson (Union) 65.74%; ▌M. D. McHenry (Democratic) 34.26%
Iowa 6	Asahel W. Hubbard	Republican– Union	1862	Incumbent re-elected.	▌ ✓ Asahel W. Hubbard (Union) 72.78%; ▌Seander Chapman (Democratic) 27.72%

== Kansas ==
Kansas held elections on November 8, 1864.

District	Incumbent			This race	
District	Member	Party	First elected	Results	Candidates
Kansas at-large	A. Carter Wilder	Republican– Union	1862	Incumbent retired. Union hold.	▌ ✓ Sidney Clarke (Union) 52.70%; ▌Albert L. Lee (Republican Union) 47.30%

== Kentucky ==
Kentucky held elections on August 7, 1865, after the term began but before Congress convened.

District	Incumbent			This race	
District	Member	Party	First elected	Results	Candidates
Kentucky 1	Lucien Anderson	Unconditional; Union	1863 (Note: Anderson was elected as a Union Democrat and became an Unconditional Unionist in December 1863.)	Incumbent retired. Conservative gain.	▌ ✓ Lawrence S. Trimble (Conservative) 61.89%; ▌C. D. Bradley (Unconditional Union) 38.11%
Kentucky 2	George H. Yeaman	Union; Democratic	1862 (special)	Incumbent lost re-election. Conservative gain.	▌ ✓ Burwell C. Ritter (Conservative) 54.66%; ▌George H. Yeaman (Unconditional Union) 45.34%
Kentucky 3	Henry Grider	Union; Democratic	1861	Incumbent re-elected as a Conservative. Conservative gain.	▌ ✓ Henry Grider (Conservative) 57.27%; ▌J. H. Lowry (Unconditional Union) 42.73%
Kentucky 4	Aaron Harding	Union; Democratic	1861	Incumbent re-elected as a Conservative. Conservative gain.	▌ ✓ Aaron Harding (Conservative) 72.10%; ▌Marion C. Taylor (Unconditional Union) 27.90%
Kentucky 5	Robert Mallory	Union; Democratic	1859	Incumbent lost re-election. Unconditional Union gain.	▌ ✓ Lovell Rousseau (Unconditional Union) 54.11%; ▌Robert Mallory (Conservative) 44.26%; ▌Mark Munday (Conservative) 1.63%
Kentucky 6	Green C. Smith	Unconditional; Union	1863	Incumbent re-elected.	▌ ✓ Green C. Smith (Unconditional Union) 54.42%; ▌Andrew H. Ward (Conservative) 45.58%
Kentucky 7	Brutus J. Clay	Union; Democratic	1863	Incumbent retired. Conservative gain.	▌ ✓ George S. Shanklin (Conservative) 65.91%; ▌Speed S. Fry (Unconditional Union) 34.09%
Kentucky 8	William H. Randall	Unconditional; Union	1863 (Note: Randall was elected as a Union Democrat and became an Unconditional Unionist in December 1863.)	Incumbent re-elected.	▌ ✓ William H. Randall (Unconditional Union) 73.55%; ▌Thomas T. Garrard (Conservative) 26.45%
Kentucky 9	William H. Wadsworth	Union; Democratic	1861	Incumbent retired. Unconditional Union gain.	▌ ✓ Samuel McKee (Unconditional Union) 56.67%; ▌J. Smith Hart (Conservative) 43.33%

== Louisiana ==
Louisiana held successive elections in 1864 and 1865 to fill vacancies in the 38th Congress and elect representatives to the 39th Congress.

=== 38th Congress ===
Louisiana held no elections for the 38th Congress in 1862 or 1863 as a result of secession. Late elections were held on September 5, 1864, but the elected members were not seated by the House.

District	Incumbent			This race	
District	Member	Party	First elected	Results	Candidates
Louisiana 1	Vacant			Seat vacant since March 4, 1863. Winner not seated.	▌ ✓ M. F. Bonzano (Unknown) 51.54%; ▌Edmund Abell (Unknown) 48.46%
Louisiana 2	Vacant			Seat vacant since March 4, 1863. Winner not seated.	▌ ✓ A. P. Field (Unknown) 57.38%; ▌A. P. Dostie (Unknown) 42.62%
Louisiana 3	Vacant			Seat vacant since January 26, 1861. Winner not seated.	▌ ✓ W. D. Mann (Unknown) 95.02%; ▌Scattering 4.98%
Louisiana 4	Vacant			Seat vacant since January 26, 1861. Winner not seated.	▌ ✓ T. M. Welles (Unknown) 100.0%
Louisiana 5	Vacant			Seat vacant since January 26, 1861. Winner not seated.	▌ ✓ Robert W. Taliaferro (Unknown) 100.0%

=== 39th Congress ===
Louisiana held elections for the 39th Congress on November 6, 1865, following the end of the Civil War, but the winners were not seated by the House.

District	Incumbent			This race	
District	Member	Party	First elected	Results	Candidates
Louisiana 1	Vacant			Seat vacant since March 4, 1863. Winner not seated.	▌ ✓ Louis St. Martin (Democratic) 74.00%; ▌Edmond Abell (Conservative Union) 25.39%; Scattering 0.60%
Louisiana 2	Vacant			Seat vacant since March 4, 1863. Winner not seated.	▌ ✓ Jacob Barker (Democratic) 68.98%; ▌B. L. Lynch (Independent) 14.78%; ▌A. P. Field (Conservative Union) 10.21%; ▌J. W. Overall (Independent) 6.03%
Louisiana 3	Vacant			Seat vacant since January 26, 1861. Winner not seated.	▌ ✓ Robert C. Wickliffe (Democratic) 62.26%; ▌J. H. Muse (Unknown) 30.48%; ▌W. Mithoff (Conservative Union) 6.37%; ▌Louis St. Martin (Democratic) 0.34%; Scattering 0.55%
Louisiana 4	Vacant			Seat vacant since January 26, 1861. Winner not seated.	▌ ✓ John E. King (Democratic) 45.15%; ▌A. Duperier (Conservative Union) 30.35%; ▌J. M. Graham (Unknown) 11.38%; ▌John G. Pratt (Democratic) 9.87%; ▌F. L. Claiborne (Unknown) 2.84%; ▌L. Duprier (Unknown) 0.41%
Louisiana 5	Vacant			Seat vacant since January 26, 1861. Winner not seated.	▌ ✓ John Ray (Conservative Union) 61.38%; ▌J. Smith Young (Democratic) 38.62%

== Maine ==
Maine held elections on September 11, 1864.

District	Incumbent			This race	
District	Member	Party	First elected	Results	Candidates
Maine 1	Lorenzo D. Sweat	Democratic	1862	Incumbent lost re-election. Union gain.	▌ ✓ John Lynch (Union) 54.57%; ▌Lorenzo D. Sweat (Democratic) 45.43%
Maine 2	Sidney Perham	Republican– Union	1860	Incumbent re-elected.	▌ ✓ Sidney Perham (Union) 60.59%; ▌Samuel C. Andrews (Democratic) 39.41%
Maine 3	James G. Blaine	Republican– Union	1860	Incumbent re-elected.	▌ ✓ James G. Blaine (Union) 59.52%; ▌Albert P. Gould (Democratic) 40.48%
Maine 4	John H. Rice	Republican– Union	1856	Incumbent re-elected.	▌ ✓ John H. Rice (Union) 61.17%; ▌James C. Madigan (Democratic) 39.26%
Maine 5	Frederick A. Pike	Republican– Union	1860	Incumbent re-elected.	▌ ✓ Frederick A. Pike (Union) 58.13%; ▌James White (Democratic) 41.87%

== Maryland ==
Maryland held elections on November 8, 1864.

District	Incumbent			This race	
District	Member	Party	First elected	Results	Candidates
Maryland 1	John Creswell	Republican– Union	1863	Incumbent retired. Democratic gain.	▌ ✓ Hiram McCullough (Democratic) 60.54%; ▌Jonathan A. Creswell (Union) 39.46%
Maryland 2	Edwin H. Webster	Republican– Union	1859	Incumbent re-elected.	▌ ✓ Edwin H. Webster (Union) 69.93%; ▌William Kimmell (Democratic) 30.07%
Maryland 3	Henry Winter Davis	Republican– Union	1863	Incumbent retired. Union hold.	▌ ✓ Charles E. Phelps (Union) 84.16%; ▌A. Lewis Knott (Democratic) 15.84%
Maine 4	Francis Thomas	Republican– Union	1861	Incumbent re-elected.	▌ ✓ Francis Thomas (Union) 61.18%; ▌Andrew K. Syester (Democratic) 38.82%
Maryland 5	Benjamin G. Harris	Democratic	1863	Incumbent re-elected.	▌ ✓ Benjamin G. Harris (Democratic) 72.28%; ▌John C. Holland (Union) 27.72%

== Massachusetts ==
Massachusetts held elections on November 8, 1864.

District	Incumbent			This race	
District	Member	Party	First elected	Results	Candidates
Massachusetts 1	Thomas D. Eliot	Republican– Union	1858	Incumbent re-elected.	▌ ✓ Thomas D. Eliot (Union) 82.77%; ▌Sylvanus B. Phinney (Democratic) 17.23%
Massachusetts 2	Oakes Ames	Republican– Union	1862	Incumbent re-elected.	▌ ✓ Oakes Ames (Union) 72.07%; ▌James Maguire (Democratic) 27.93%
Massachusetts 3	Alexander H. Rice	Republican– Union	1858	Incumbent re-elected.	▌ ✓ Alexander H. Rice (Union) 62.35%; ▌John S. Sleeper (Democratic) 37.65%
Massachusetts 4	Samuel Hooper	Republican– Union	1861 (special)	Incumbent re-elected.	▌ ✓ Samuel Hooper (Union) 65.48%; ▌Josiah Gardner Abbott (Democratic) 34.52%
Massachusetts 5	John B. Alley	Republican– Union	1858	Incumbent re-elected.	▌ ✓ John B. Alley (Union) 75.89%; ▌Joseph B. Morse (Democratic) 24.11%
Massachusetts 6	Daniel W. Gooch	Republican– Union	1858	Incumbent re-elected.	▌ ✓ Daniel W. Gooch (Union) 71.66%; ▌Thomas J. Greenwood (Democratic) 28.34%
Massachusetts 7	George S. Boutwell	Republican– Union	1862	Incumbent re-elected.	▌ ✓ George S. Boutwell (Union) 68.99%; ▌Theodore H. Sweetser (Democratic) 31.01%
Massachusetts 8	John D. Baldwin	Republican– Union	1862	Incumbent re-elected.	▌ ✓ John D. Baldwin (Union) 74.75%; ▌George Hodges (Democratic) 25.25%
Massachusetts 9	William B. Washburn	Republican– Union	1862	Incumbent re-elected.	▌ ✓ William B. Washburn (Union) 81.47%; ▌Nathaniel Wood (Democratic) 18.53%
Massachusetts 10	Henry Laurens Dawes	Republican– Union	1856	Incumbent re-elected.	▌ ✓ Henry L. Dawes (Union) 64.74%; ▌Harry Arnold (Democratic) 35.26%

== Michigan ==
Michigan held elections on November 8, 1864.

District	Incumbent			This race	
District	Member	Party	First elected	Results	Candidates
Michigan 1	Fernando C. Beaman	Republican– Union	1860	Incumbent re-elected.	▌ ✓ Fernando C. Beaman (Union) 53.14%; ▌David A. Noble (Democratic) 46.86%
Michigan 2	Charles Upson	Republican– Union	1862	Incumbent re-elected.	▌ ✓ Charles Upson (Union) 60.43%; ▌Nathaniel A. Balch (Democratic) 39.57%
Michigan 3	John W. Longyear	Republican– Union	1862	Incumbent re-elected.	▌ ✓ John W. Longyear (Union) 54.74%; ▌David Johnson (Democratic) 45.26%
Michigan 4	Francis William Kellogg	Republican– Union	1858	Incumbent retired. Union hold.	▌ ✓ Thomas W. Ferry (Union) 58.94%; ▌Frederick Hall (Democratic) 41.06%
Michigan 5	Augustus C. Baldwin	Democratic	1862	Incumbent lost re-election. Union gain.	▌ ✓ Rowland E. Trowbridge (Union) 51.44%; ▌Augustus C. Baldwin (Democratic) 48.56%
Michigan 6	John F. Driggs	Republican– Union	1862	Incumbent re-elected.	▌ ✓ John F. Driggs (Union) 54.08%; ▌William Willard (Democratic) 45.92%

== Minnesota ==
District	Incumbent			This race	
District	Member	Party	First elected	Results	Candidates
Minnesota 1	William Windom	Republican– Union	1859	Incumbent re-elected.	▌ ✓ William Windom (Union) 60.57%; ▌Henry W. Lamberton (Democratic) 39.43%
Minnesota 2	Ignatius L. Donnelly	Republican– Union	1862	Incumbent re-elected.	▌ ✓ Ignatius L. Donnelly (Union) 56.98%; ▌John M. Gillman (Democratic) 43.02%

== Mississippi ==
Mississippi held elections on October 2, 1865, following the end of the Civil War, but the winners were not seated by the House.

District	Incumbent			This race	
District	Member	Party	First elected	Results	Candidates
Mississippi 1	Vacant			Seat vacant since January 9, 1861. Winner not seated.	▌ ✓ Arthur E. Reynolds (Unknown) 57.73%; ▌Alexander B. Bradford (Unknown) 41.75%; ▌A. W. West (Unknown) 0.19%; Scattering 0.33%
Mississippi 2	Vacant			Seat vacant since January 9, 1861. Winner not seated.	▌ ✓ Richard A. Pinson (Unknown) 70.78%; ▌J. T. Griffen (Unknown) 17.90%; ▌John Nethery (Unknown) 11.32%; ▌L. E. Houston (Unknown) 0.51%
Mississippi 3	Vacant			Seat vacant since January 9, 1861. Winner not seated.	▌ ✓ James T. Harrison (Unknown) 82.70%; ▌L. J. Dupree (Unknown) 9.89%; ▌Hiram Cassedy (Unknown) 7.21%
Mississippi 4	Vacant			Seat vacant since January 9, 1861. Winner not seated.	▌ ✓ Absolom M. West (Unknown) 48.21%; ▌ Sylvanus Evans (Unknown) 29.76%; ▌ Franklin Smith (Unknown) 22.03%
Mississippi 5	Vacant			Seat vacant since January 9, 1861. Winner not seated.	▌ ✓ Ephraim G. Peyton (Unknown) 98.01%; ▌J. T. Lumpkin (Unknown) 1.99%

== Missouri ==
Missouri held elections on November 8, 1864.

District	Incumbent			This race	
District	Member	Party	First elected	Results	Candidates
Missouri 1	Samuel Knox	Radical	1862 (Note: Elected as an Immediate (Radical) Emancipationist.)	Incumbent lost re-election. Democratic gain.	▌ ✓ John Hogan (Democratic) 43.15%; ▌Charles P. Johnson (Radical) 34.24%; ▌Samuel Knox (Radical) 22.61%
Missouri 2	Henry Taylor Blow	Radical	1862	Incumbent re-elected.	▌ ✓ Henry T. Blow (Radical) 90.27%; ▌Edward Stafford (Democratic) 10.73%
Missouri 3	John G. Scott	Democratic	1863 (special)	Incumbent lost re-election. Radical gain.	▌ ✓ Thomas E. Noell (Radical) 59.21%; ▌David C. Tuttle (Democratic) 28.12%; ▌William T. Leeper (Independent Union) 12.66%
Missouri 4	Sempronius H. Boyd	Radical	1862	Incumbent lost re-election. Independent Union gain.	▌ ✓ John R. Kelso (Independent Union) 48.27%; ▌Sempronius H. Boyd (Radical) 46.90%; ▌M. J. Hubble (Democratic) 4.83%
Missouri 5	Joseph W. McClurg	Radical	1862	Incumbent re-elected.	▌ ✓ Joseph W. McClurg (Radical) 72.40%; ▌Sample Orr (Democratic) 27.60%
Missouri 6	Austin A. King	Democratic	1862	Incumbent lost re-election as an Independent Democrat. Radical gain.	▌ ✓ Robert T. Van Horn (Radical) 47.15%; ▌Elijah H. Norton (Democratic) 43.48%; ▌Austin A. King (Independent Democratic) 9.37%
Missouri 7	Benjamin F. Loan	Radical	1862	Incumbent re-elected.	▌ ✓ Benjamin F. Loan (Radical) 82.41%; ▌Harrison B. Branch (Democratic) 17.35%; ▌James M. Bassett (Independent Union) 0.24%
Missouri 8	William A. Hall	Democratic	1861 (special)	Incumbent retired. Radical gain.	▌ ✓ John F. Benjamin (Radical) 74.31%; ▌John M. Glover (Democratic) 25.69%
Missouri 9	James S. Rollins	Democratic	1862 (Note: Rollins was elected as a Conservative Unionist. He became a Democrat near the end of his term.)	Incumbent retired. Radical gain.	▌ ✓ George W. Anderson (Radical) 51.84%; ▌Odon Guitar (Democratic) 48.16%

== Montana Territory ==
See non-voting delegates, below.

== Nebraska Territory ==
See non-voting delegates, below.

== Nevada ==
Nevada held successive elections in 1864 and 1865 to fill one vacancy in the 38th Congress and elect its representative to the 39th Congress.

=== 38th Congress ===
Nevada elected its representative to the 38th Congress on November 8, 1864.

District	Incumbent			This race	
District	Member	Party	First elected	Results	Candidates
Nevada at-large	New state			New seat. Union gain.	▌ ✓ Henry G. Worthington (Union) 59.87%; ▌A. C. Bradford (Democratic) 40.13%

=== 39th Congress ===
Nevada elected its representative to the 39th Congress on November 7, 1865.

District	Incumbent			This race	
District	Member	Party	First elected	Results	Candidates
Nevada at-large	Henry G. Worthington	Union	1864	Incumbent lost renomination. Union hold.	▌ ✓ Delos R. Ashley (Union) 62.50%; ▌H. K. Mitchell (Democratic) 37.50%

== New Hampshire ==
New Hampshire held elections on March 14, 1865, after the start of the term but before Congress convened.

District	Incumbent			This race	
District	Member	Party	First elected	Results	Candidates
New Hampshire 1	Daniel Marcy	Democratic	1863	Incumbent lost re-election. Union gain.	▌ ✓ Gilman Marston (Union) 50.42%; ▌Daniel Marcy (Democratic) 47.63%; ▌ Thomas E. Sawyer (Unknown) 1.95%
New Hampshire 2	Edward H. Rollins	Republican– Union	1861	Incumbent re-elected.	▌ ✓ Edward H. Rollins (Union) 55.26%; ▌Lewis C. Clark (Democratic) 44.74%
New Hampshire 3	James W. Patterson	Republican– Union	1863	Incumbent re-elected.	▌ ✓ James W. Patterson (Union) 56.24%; ▌Hiram Bingham (Democratic) 43.76%

== New Jersey ==
New Jersey held elections on November 8, 1864.

District	Incumbent			This race	
District	Member	Party	First elected	Results	Candidates
New Jersey 1	John F. Starr	Republican– Union	1862	Incumbent re-elected.	▌ ✓ John F. Starr (Union) 54.42%; ▌Isaac V. Dickinson (Democratic) 45.58%
New Jersey 2	George Middleton	Democratic	1862	Incumbent lost re-election. Union gain.	▌ ✓ William A. Newell (Union) 51.59%; ▌George Middleton (Democratic) 48.41%
New Jersey 3	William G. Steele	Democratic	1860	Incumbent retired. Democratic hold.	▌ ✓ Charles Sitgreaves (Democratic) 58.38%; ▌Charles Scranton (Union) 41.62%
New Jersey 4	Andrew J. Rogers	Democratic	1862	Incumbent re-elected.	▌ ✓ Andrew J. Rogers (Democratic) 53.59%; ▌Theodore Little (Union) 46.41%
New Jersey 5	Nehemiah Perry	Democratic	1858	Incumbent retired. Democratic hold.	▌ ✓ Edwin R. V. Wright (Democratic) 53.91%; ▌Edgar B. Wakeman (Democratic) 46.09%

== New Mexico Territory ==
See non-voting delegates, below.

== New York ==
New York held elections on November 8, 1864.

District	Incumbent			This race	
District	Member	Party	First elected	Results	Candidates
New York 1	Henry G. Stebbins	Democratic	1862	Incumbent resigned October 24, 1864. Democratic hold.	▌ ✓ Stephen Taber (Democratic) 54.96%; ▌George V. Curtis (Union) 45.04%
New York 2	Martin Kalbfleisch	Democratic	1862	Incumbent retired. Democratic hold.	▌ ✓ Teunis G. Bergen (Democratic) 60.69%; ▌Samuel T. Maddox (Union) 39.31%
New York 3	Moses F. Odell	Democratic	1860	Incumbent retired. Union gain.	▌ ✓ James Humphrey (Union) 51.27%; ▌Thomas H. Faron (Democratic) 48.73%
New York 4	Benjamin Wood	Democratic	1860	Incumbent retired. Democratic hold.	▌ ✓ Morgan Jones (Democratic–Tammany Hall) 57.17%; ▌William Walsh (Democratic–Mozart Hall) 32.81%; ▌Carolan O. Bryant (Union) 10.02%
New York 5	Fernando Wood	Democratic	1862	Incumbent retired to run in the 9th district. Democratic hold.	▌ ✓ Nelson Taylor (Democratic–Tammany Hall) 53.05%; ▌William B. Maclay (Democratic–Mozart Hall) 24.52%; ▌Epes E. Elleay (Union) 22.43%
New York 6	Elijah Ward	Democratic	1860	Incumbent lost re-election. Union gain.	▌ ✓ Henry J. Raymond (Union) 42.44%; ▌Elijah Ward (Democratic–Tammany Hall) 40.20%; ▌Eli P. Norton (Democratic–Mozart Hall) 9.55%; ▌Rush Hawkins (Independent Union) 7.81%
New York 7	John Winthrop Chanler	Democratic	1862	Incumbent re-elected.	▌ ✓ John W. Chanler (Democratic) 67.13%; ▌William Boardman (Union) 32.87%
New York 8	James Brooks	Democratic	1862	Incumbent re-elected.	▌ ✓ James Brooks (Democratic–Mozart Hall) 39.99%; ▌William E. Dodge (Union) 39.30%; ▌Thomas J. Barr (Democratic–Tammany Hall) 20.71%
New York 9	Anson Herrick	Democratic	1862	Incumbent lost re-election. Union gain.	▌ ✓ William A. Darling (Union) 38.10%; ▌Fernando Wood (Democratic–Mozart Hall) 31.08%; ▌Anson Herrick (Democratic–Tammany Hall) 28.78%; ▌J. Trumbull Smith (Independent Democratic) 2.03%
New York 10	William Radford	Democratic	1862	Incumbent re-elected.	▌ ✓ William Radford (Democratic) 56.05%; ▌Francis Larkin (Union) 43.95%
New York 11	Charles H. Winfield	Democratic	1862	Incumbent re-elected.	▌ ✓ Charles H. Winfield (Democratic) 50.61%; ▌Ambrose S. Murray (Union) 49.39%
New York 12	Homer A. Nelson	Democratic	1862	Incumbent lost re-election. Union gain.	▌ ✓ John H. Ketcham (Union) 51.41%; ▌Homer A. Nelson (Democratic) 48.59%
New York 13	John B. Steele	Democratic	1860	Incumbent retired. Democratic hold.	▌ ✓ Edwin N. Hubbell (Democratic) 53.14%; ▌Theodore B. Gates (Union) 46.86%
New York 14	John V. L. Pruyn	Democratic	1863 (special)	Incumbent retired. Democratic hold.	▌ ✓ Charles Goodyear (Democratic) 57.48%; ▌John H. Gardner (Union) 42.52%
New York 15	John A. Griswold	Democratic	1862	Incumbent re-elected as a Unionist. Union gain.	▌ ✓ John A. Griswold (Union) 54.12%; ▌William L. Van Alstyne (Union) 45.88%
New York 16	Orlando Kellogg	Republican– Union	1862	Incumbent re-elected.	▌ ✓ Orlando Kellogg (Union) 53.94%; ▌Thomas S. Gray (Democratic) 46.06%
New York 17	Calvin T. Hulburd	Republican– Union	1862	Incumbent re-elected.	▌ ✓ Calvin T. Hulburd (Union) 69.97%; ▌Willam J. Averill (Democratic) 30.03%
New York 18	James M. Marvin	Republican– Union	1862	Incumbent re-elected.	▌ ✓ James M. Marvin (Union) 51.57%; ▌Alonzo C. Paige (Democratic) 48.43%
New York 19	Samuel F. Miller	Republican– Union	1862	Incumbent retired. Union hold.	▌ ✓ Demas Hubbard Jr. (Union) 54.80%; ▌Hezekiah Sturgis (Democratic) 45.20%
New York 20	Ambrose W. Clark	Republican– Union	1860	Incumbent retired. Union hold.	▌ ✓ Addison H. Laflin (Union) 56.22%; ▌Frederick W. Hubbard (Democratic) 43.78%
New York 21	Francis Kernan	Democratic	1862	Incumbent lost re-election. Union gain.	▌ ✓ Roscoe Conkling (Union) 52.52%; ▌Francis Kernan (Democratic) 47.48%
New York 22	DeWitt Clinton Littlejohn	Republican– Union	1862	Incumbent retired. Union hold.	▌ ✓ Sidney T. Holmes (Union) 59.95%; ▌Albertus Perry (Democratic) 40.05%
New York 23	Thomas Treadwell Davis	Republican– Union	1862	Incumbent re-elected.	▌ ✓ Thomas T. Davis (Union) 58.58%; ▌Thomas S. Gray (Democratic) 41.42%
New York 24	Theodore M. Pomeroy	Republican– Union	1860	Incumbent re-elected.	▌ ✓ Theodore M. Pomeroy (Union) 57.53%; ▌George W. Cuyler (Democratic) 42.47%
New York 25	Daniel Morris	Republican– Union	1862	Incumbent re-elected.	▌ ✓ Daniel Morris (Union) 58.75%; ▌Barzillai Slosson (Democratic) 41.25%
New York 26	Giles W. Hotchkiss	Republican– Union	1862	Incumbent re-elected.	▌ ✓ Giles W. Hotchkiss (Union) 58.99%; ▌John Magee (Democratic) 41.01%
New York 27	Robert B. Van Valkenburgh	Republican– Union	1860	Incumbent retired. Union hold.	▌ ✓ Hamilton Ward Sr. (Union) 60.26%; ▌Andrew J. McNott (Democratic) 39.74%
New York 28	Freeman Clarke	Republican– Union	1862	Incumbent retired. Union hold.	▌ ✓ Roswell Hart (Union) 52.49%; ▌James L. Angle (Democratic) 47.51%
New York 29	Augustus Frank	Republican– Union	1858	Incumbent retired. Union hold.	▌ ✓ Burt Van Horn (Union) 57.07%; ▌James M. Willett (Democratic) 42.93%
New York 30	John Ganson	Democratic	1862	Incumbent retired. Democratic hold.	▌ ✓ James M. Humphrey (Democratic) 50.71%; ▌Orville J. Holley (Union) 49.29%
New York 31	Reuben Fenton	Republican– Union	1856	Incumbent retired. Union hold.	▌ ✓ Henry Van Aernam (Union) 65.49%; ▌Jonas K. Dutton (Democratic) 34.51%

== North Carolina ==
North Carolina held elections on November 9, 1865, following the end of the Civil War, but the winners were not seated by the House.

District	Incumbent			This race	
District	Member	Party	First elected	Results	Candidates
North Carolina 1	Vacant			Seat vacant since May 20, 1861. Winner not seated.	▌ ✓ Jesse R. Stubbs (Unknown) 46.94%; ▌Rufus K. Speed (Unknown) 39.63%; ▌William E. Bond (Unknown) 13.42%
North Carolina 2	Vacant			Seat vacant since May 20, 1861. Winner not seated.	▌ ✓ Charles C. Clark (Unknown) 93.10%; ▌Robert F. Lehman (Unknown) 4.26%; ▌John Robinson (Unknown) 2.64%
North Carolina 3	Vacant			Seat vacant since May 20, 1861. Winner not seated.	▌ ✓ Thomas C. Fuller (Unknown) 52.29%; ▌Alexander Little (Unknown) 39.98%; ▌Thomas S. Ashe (Unknown) 7.33%; ▌Nathaniel McLean (Unknown) 0.40%
North Carolina 4	Vacant			Seat vacant since May 20, 1861. Winner not seated.	▌ ✓ Josiah Turner (Unknown) 54.10%; ▌John P. Huss (Unknown) 41.80%; ▌L. C. Edwards (Unknown) 4.10%
North Carolina 5	Vacant			Seat vacant since May 20, 1861. Winner not seated.	▌ ✓ Bedford Brown (Unknown) 50.56%; ▌Lewis Hawes (Unknown) 49.44%
North Carolina 6	Vacant			Seat vacant since May 20, 1861. Winner not seated.	▌ ✓ Samuel H. Walkup (Unknown) 41.35%; ▌James G. Ramsay (Unknown) 40.66%; ▌William Sloan (Unknown) 17.99%
North Carolina 7	Vacant			Seat vacant since May 20, 1861. Winner not seated.	▌ ✓ Alexander H. Jones (Unknown) 38.27%; ▌Burgess S. Gaither (Unknown) 25.43%; ▌Tod R. Caldwell (Unknown) 18.53%; ▌James R. Love (Unknown) 17.77%

== Ohio ==
Ohio held elections on October 10, 1864.

District	Incumbent			This race	
District	Member	Party	First elected	Results	Candidates
Ohio 1	George H. Pendleton	Democratic	1856	Incumbent retired. Union gain.	▌ ✓ Benjamin Eggleston (Union) 56.77%; ▌George E. Pugh (Democratic) 43.23%
Ohio 2	Alexander Long	Democratic	1862	Incumbent lost renomination. Union gain.	▌ ✓ Rutherford B. Hayes (Union) 58.68%; ▌Joseph C. Butler (Democratic) 41.32%
Ohio 3	Robert C. Schenck	Republican– Union	1862	Incumbent re-elected.	▌ ✓ Robert C. Schenck (Union) 53.43%; ▌David A. Houk (Democratic) 46.57%
Ohio 4	John F. McKinney	Democratic	1862	Incumbent lost re-election. Union gain.	▌ ✓ William Lawrence (Union) 56.10%; ▌John F. McKinney (Democratic) 43.90%
Ohio 5	Francis C. Le Blond	Democratic	1862	Incumbent re-elected.	▌ ✓ Francis C. Le Blond (Democratic) 55.15%; ▌Moses B. Walker (Union) 44.85%
Ohio 6	Chilton A. White	Democratic	1860	Incumbent lost re-election. Union gain.	▌ ✓ Reader W. Clarke (Union) 55.21%; ▌Chilton A. White (Democratic) 44.79%
Ohio 7	Samuel S. Cox	Democratic	1862	Incumbent lost re-election. Union gain.	▌ ✓ Samuel Shellabarger (Union) 57.19%; ▌Samuel S. Cox (Democratic) 42.81%
Ohio 8	William Johnston	Democratic	1862	Incumbent lost re-election. Union gain.	▌ ✓ James R. Hubbell (Union) 54.93%; ▌William Johnston (Democratic) 45.07%
Ohio 9	Warren P. Noble	Democratic	1860	Incumbent lost re-election. Union gain.	▌ ✓ Ralph P. Buckland (Union) 53.83%; ▌Warren P. Noble (Democratic) 46.17%
Ohio 10	James M. Ashley	Republican– Union	1862	Incumbent re-elected.	▌ ✓ James M. Ashley (Union) 51.88%; ▌Americus V. Rice (Democratic) 48.12%
Ohio 11	Wells A. Hutchins	Democratic	1862	Incumbent lost re-election. Union gain.	▌ ✓ Hezekiah S. Bundy (Union) 59.98%; ▌Wells A. Hutchins (Democratic) 40.02%
Ohio 12	William E. Finck	Democratic	1862	Incumbent re-elected.	▌ ✓ William E. Finck (Democratic) 53.49%; ▌Job E. Stevenson (Union) 46.51%
Ohio 13	John O'Neill	Democratic	1862	Incumbent retired. Union gain.	▌ ✓ Columbus Delano (Union) 50.48%; ▌Charles Follett (Union) 49.52%
Ohio 14	George Bliss	Democratic	1862	Incumbent lost re-election. Union gain.	▌ ✓ Martin Welker (Union) 55.59%; ▌George Bliss (Democratic) 44.41%
Ohio 15	James R. Morris	Democratic	1862	Incumbent lost re-election. Union gain.	▌ ✓ Tobias A. Plants (Union) 57.29%; ▌James R. Morris (Democratic) 42.71%
Ohio 16	Joseph W. White	Democratic	1882	Incumbent lost re-election. Union gain.	▌ ✓ John Bingham (Union) 52.47%; ▌Joseph W. White (Democratic) 47.53%
Ohio 17	Ephraim R. Eckley	Republican– Union	1862	Incumbent re-elected.	▌ ✓ Ephraim R. Eckley (Union) 59.08%; ▌Jonathan H. Wallace (Democratic) 40.92%
Ohio 18	Rufus P. Spalding	Republican– Union	1862	Incumbent re-elected.	▌ ✓ Rufus P. Spalding (Union) 71.80%; ▌Jeptha Wade (Democratic) 28.20%
Ohio 19	James A. Garfield	Republican– Union	1862	Incumbent re-elected.	▌ ✓ James A. Garfield (Union) 74.41%; ▌Halsey H. Moses (Democratic) 25.59%

== Oregon ==
Oregon held elections on June 5, 1864.

District	Incumbent			This race	
District	Member	Party	First elected	Results	Candidates
Oregon at-large	John R. McBride	Republican– Union	1862	Incumbent retired. Union hold.	▌ ✓ James H. Henderson (Union) 59.12%; ▌James K. Kelly (Democratic) 40.88%

== Pennsylvania ==
Pennsylvania held elections on October 10, 1864.

District	Incumbent			This race	
District	Member	Party	First elected	Results	Candidates
Pennsylvania 1	Samuel J. Randall	Democratic	1862	Incumbent re-elected.	▌ ✓ Samuel J. Randall (Democratic) 55.78%; ▌John M. Butler (Union) 44.22%
Pennsylvania 2	Charles O'Neill	Republican– Union	1862	Incumbent re-elected.	▌ ✓ Charles O'Neill (Union) 61.75%; ▌William M. Reilly (Democratic) 38.25%
Pennsylvania 3	Leonard Myers	Republican– Union	1862	Incumbent re-elected.	▌ ✓ Leonard Myers (Union) 53.44%; ▌Charles Buckwalter (Democratic) 46.56%
Pennsylvania 4	William D. Kelley	Republican– Union	1860	Incumbent re-elected.	▌ ✓ William D. Kelley (Union) 58.35%; ▌Charles Northrop (Democratic) 41.65%
Pennsylvania 5	Martin Russell Thayer	Republican– Union	1862	Incumbent re-elected.	▌ ✓ M. Russell Thayer (Union) 50.64%; ▌Henry P. Ross (Democratic) 49.36%
Pennsylvania 6	John D. Stiles	Democratic	1862 (special)	Incumbent retired. Democratic hold.	▌ ✓ Benjamin M. Boyer (Democratic) 57.08%; ▌George Bullock (Union) 42.92%
Pennsylvania 7	John M. Broomall	Republican– Union	1862	Incumbent re-elected.	▌ ✓ John M. Broomall (Union) 60.14%; ▌John C. Beatty (Democratic) 39.86%
Pennsylvania 8	Sydenham E. Ancona	Democratic	1860	Incumbent re-elected.	▌ ✓ Sydenham E. Ancona (Democratic) 66.91%; ▌William M. Hiester (Union) 33.09%
Pennsylvania 9	Thaddeus Stevens	Republican– Union	1858	Incumbent re-elected.	▌ ✓ Thaddeus Stevens (Union) 61.65%; ▌Henry M. North (Democratic) 38.35%
Pennsylvania 10	Myer Strouse	Democratic	1862	Incumbent re-elected.	▌ ✓ Myer Strouse (Democratic) 51.09%; ▌Howell Fisher (Union) 48.91%
Pennsylvania 11	Philip Johnson	Democratic	1860	Incumbent re-elected.	▌ ✓ Philip Johnson (Democratic) 67.06%; ▌James L. Selfridge (Union) 32.94%
Pennsylvania 12	Charles Denison	Democratic	1862	Incumbent re-elected.	▌ ✓ Charles Denison (Democratic) 51.25%; ▌Winthrop W. Ketcham (Union) 48.75%
Pennsylvania 13	Henry Wells Tracy	Republican– Union	1862	Incumbent retired. Union hold.	▌ ✓ Ulysses Mercur (Union) 52.71%; ▌Victor E. Piollet (Democratic) 47.29%
Pennsylvania 14	William Henry Miller	Democratic	1862	Incumbent lost re-election. Union gain.	▌ ✓ George F. Miller (Union) 51.16%; ▌William H. Miller (Democratic) 48.74%
Pennsylvania 15	Joseph Bailey	War Democrat	1860	Incumbent lost re-election as a Unionist. Democratic gain.	▌ ✓ Adam J. Glossbrenner (Democratic) 55.86%; ▌Joseph Bailey (Union) 44.14%
Pennsylvania 16	Alexander H. Coffroth	Democratic	1862	Incumbent lost re-election. (Note: Coffroth contested the election and was seated by the House pending an investigation; the House decided in favor of Koontz on June 18, 1866.); Union gain.	▌ ✓ William H. Koontz (Union) 50.15%; ▌Alexander H. Coffroth (Democratic) 49.85%
Pennsylvania 17	Archibald McAllister	Democratic	1862	Incumbent retired. Union gain.	▌ ✓ Abraham A. Barker (Union) 51.42%; ▌Robert L. Johnston (Democratic) 48.58%
Pennsylvania 18	James Tracy Hale	Independent; Union	1858	Incumbent retired. Union gain.	▌ ✓ Stephen F. Wilson (Union) 51.92%; ▌Theodore Wright (Democratic) 48.08%
Pennsylvania 19	Glenni W. Scofield	Republican– Union	1862	Incumbent re-elected.	▌ ✓ Glenni W. Scofield (Union) 53.98%; ▌William Bilger (Democratic) 46.02%
Pennsylvania 20	Amos Myers	Republican– Union	1862	Incumbent retired. Union hold.	▌ ✓ Charles V. Culver (Union) 56.60%; ▌William L. Corbett (Democratic) 43.40%
Pennsylvania 21	John L. Dawson	Democratic	1862	Incumbent re-elected.	▌ ✓ John L. Dawson (Democratic) 50.29%; ▌Smith Fuller (Union) 49.71%
Pennsylvania 22	James K. Moorhead	Republican– Union	1858	Incumbent re-elected.	▌ ✓ James K. Moorhead (Union) 61.56%; ▌James H. Hopkins (Democratic) 38.44%
Pennsylvania 23	Thomas Williams	Republican– Union	1862	Incumbent re-elected.	▌ ✓ Thomas Williams (Union) 59.39%; ▌William J. Kountz (Democratic) 40.61%
Pennsylvania 24	Jesse Lazear	Democratic	1860	Incumbent lost re-election. Union gain.	▌ ✓ George V. Lawrence (Union) 53.70%; ▌Jesse Lazear (Democratic) 46.30%

== Rhode Island ==
Rhode Island held elections on April 5, 1865, after the term began but before Congress convened.

District	Incumbent			This race	
District	Member	Party	First elected	Results	Candidates
Rhode Island 1 Eastern district	Thomas Jenckes	Republican– Union	1863	Incumbent re-elected.	▌ ✓ Thomas Jenckes (Union) 98.99%; Scattering 1.01%
Rhode Island 2 Western district	Nathan F. Dixon II	Republican– Union	1863	Incumbent re-elected.	▌ ✓ Nathan F. Dixon (Union) 71.29%; ▌Gideon Bradford (Democratic) 28.71%

== South Carolina ==
South Carolina held elections on November 22, 1865, following the end of the Civil War, but the winners were not seated by the House.

District	Incumbent			This race	
District	Member	Party	First elected	Results	Candidates
South Carolina 1	Vacant			Seat vacant since December 20, 1860. Winner not seated.	▌ ✓ John D. Kennedy (Unknown) 64.42%; ▌W. C. Dudly (Unknown) 28.83%; Scattering 6.75%
South Carolina 2	Vacant			Seat vacant since December 20, 1860. Winner not seated.	▌ ✓ William Aiken Jr. (Unknown) 39.22%; ▌Stephen Elliott Jr. (Unknown) 34.84%; ▌William Whaley (Unknown) 21.98%; ▌Lewis M. Ayer (Unknown) 3.96%
South Carolina 3	Vacant			Seat vacant since December 20, 1860. Winner not seated.	▌ ✓ S. McGowan (Unknown) **
South Carolina 4	Vacant			Seat vacant since December 20, 1860. Winner not seated.	▌ ✓ Farrow (Unknown) 51.30%; ▌McArley (Unknown) 26.34%; ▌Reed (Unknown) 22.35%

== Tennessee ==
Tennessee held elections on August 3, 1865, after the new term began but before Congress convened.

District	Incumbent			This race	
District	Member	Party	First elected	Results	Candidates
Tennessee 1	Vacant			Seat vacant since June 8, 1861. Conservative gain.	▌ ✓ Nathaniel G. Taylor (Conservative) 46.39%; ▌J. K. Miller (Unknown) 38.98%; ▌James H. Randolph (Unknown) 14.40%; ▌Thomas D. Arnold (Conservative) 0.23%
Tennessee 2	Vacant			Seat vacant since March 4, 1863. Radical gain.	▌ ✓ Horace Maynard (Radical) 56.01%; ▌Joseph A. Cooper (Conservative) 18.18%; ▌Leonidas C. Houk (Radical) 14.55%; ▌Robert K. Byrd (Unknown) 9.47%; ▌William Heiskell (Conservative) 1.70%; ▌[FNU] Wills (Unknown) 0.16%
Tennessee 3	Vacant			Seat vacant since March 4, 1863. Radical gain.	▌ ✓ William B. Stokes (Radical) 56.75%; ▌Asa Faulkner (Conservative) 32.48%; ▌John R. Hood (Unknown) 10.77%
Tennessee 4	Vacant			Seat vacant since March 4, 1863. Conservative gain.	▌ ✓ Edmund Cooper (Conservative) 97.17%; ▌James Mullins (Radical) 2.83%
Tennessee 5	Vacant			Seat vacant since June 8, 1861. Conservative gain.	▌ ✓ William B. Campbell (Conservative) 78.46%; ▌Samuel J. Carter (Radical) 21.35%; Scattering 0.19%
Tennessee 6	Vacant			Seat vacant since June 8, 1861. Radical gain.	▌ ✓ Samuel M. Arnell (Union) 74.79%; ▌Dorsey B. Thomas (Conservative) 25.21%
Tennessee 7	Vacant			Seat vacant since June 8, 1861. Radical gain.	▌ ✓ Isaac R. Hawkins (Radical) 64.62%; ▌Emerson Etheridge (Conservative) 35.38%
Tennessee 8	Vacant			Seat vacant since June 8, 1861. Conservative gain.	▌ ✓ John W. Leftwich (Conservative) 47.99%; ▌John Bullock (Conservative) 17.21%; ▌R. S. Saunders (Radical) 16.87%; ▌William C. Dunlap (Conservative) 15.06%; ▌William Hunter (Radical) 2.87%

== Texas ==
Texas did not hold elections in 1864 or 1865.

District	Incumbent			This race	
District	Member	Party	First elected	Results	Candidates
Texas 1	Vacant			Seat vacant since February 1, 1861. No election.	None.
Texas 2	Vacant			Seat vacant since February 1, 1861. No election.	None.
Texas 3	Vacant			Seat vacant since February 1, 1861. No election.	None.
Texas 4	Vacant			Seat vacant since February 1, 1861. No election.	None.

== Utah Territory ==
See non-voting delegates, below.

== Vermont ==
District	Incumbent			This race	
District	Member	Party	First elected	Results	Candidates
Vermont 1	Frederick E. Woodbridge	Republican– Union	1863	Incumbent re-elected.	▌ ✓ Frederick E. Woodbridge (Union) 71.58%; ▌Samuel Wells (Democratic) 28.42%
Vermont 2	Justin S. Morrill	Republican– Union	1854	Incumbent re-elected.	▌ ✓ Justin S. Morrill (Union) 72.14%; ▌Robert M. Ormsby (Democratic) 27.86%
Vermont 3	Portus Baxter	Republican– Union	1860	Incumbent re-elected.	▌ ✓ Portus Baxter (Union) 74.14%; ▌Giles Harrington (Democratic) 25.86%

== Virginia ==
Virginia held elections on October 12, 1865, following the end of the Civil War, but the winners were not seated by the House.

District	Incumbent			This race	
District	Member	Party	First elected	Results	Candidates
Virginia 1	Vacant			Seat vacant since March 4, 1863. Winner not seated.	▌ ✓ Lucius H. Chandler (Unknown) 50.16%; ▌John Millson (Unknown) 32.60%; ▌John R. Kirby (Unknown) 17.24%
Virginia 2	Vacant			Seat vacant since April 17, 1861. Winner not seated.	▌ ✓ William H. Curtis (Unknown) 46.77%; ▌Joseph Christian (Unknown) 34.13%; ▌Beverly B. Douglas (Unknown) 27.78%
Virginia 3	Vacant			Seat vacant since April 17, 1861. Winner not seated.	▌ ✓ P. Johnson Barbour (Unknown) 79.95%; ▌John Pendleton (Unknown) 14.65%; ▌Martin Lipscomb (Unknown) 5.40%
Virginia 4	Vacant			Seat vacant since April 17, 1861. Winner not seated.	▌ ✓ Robert Ridgway (Unknown) 79.30%; ▌Alexander Fitzpatrick (Unknown) 20.70%
Virginia 5	Vacant			Seat vacant since April 17, 1861. Winner not seated.	▌ ✓ Beverly A. Davis (Unknown) 29.14%; ▌Jonathan Stovall (Unknown) 28.41%; ▌Charles L. Mosby (Unknown) 20.14%; ▌Robert E. Withers (Unknown) 16.25%; ▌J. M. Butts (Unknown) 4.99%; Others: ▌N. Davidson (Unknown) 0.66%; ▌Thomas Grasty (Unknown) 0.41%
Virginia 6	Vacant			Seat vacant since April 17, 1861. Winner not seated.	▌ ✓ Alexander H. Stuart (Unknown) 67.96%; ▌John F. Lewis (Unknown) 32.04%
Virginia 7				Seat vacant since March 4, 1863. Winner not seated.	▌ ✓ Robert Y. Conrad (Unknown) 72.07%; ▌Lewis McKenzie (Unknown) 25.57%; ▌Gilbert S. Minor (Unknown) 2.36%
Virginia 8	Vacant			Seat vacant since April 17, 1861. Winner not seated.	▌ ✓ Daniel H. Hoge (Unknown) 64.63%; ▌David Miller (Unknown) 16.62%; ▌Edmund Longley (Unknown) 14.16%; ▌T. J. McCullock (Unknown) 4.00%

== Washington Territory ==
See non-voting delegates, below.

== West Virginia ==
West Virginia held elections on October 26, 1864.

District	Incumbent			This race	
District	Member	Party	First elected	Results	Candidates
West Virginia 1	Jacob B. Blair	Republican– Union	1863	Incumbent retired. Union hold.	▌ ✓ Chester D. Hubbard (Union) 62.52%; ▌Samuel Crane (Unknown) 37.48%
West Virginia 2	William G. Brown Sr.	Republican– Union	1863	Incumbent retired. Union hold.	▌ ✓ George R. Latham (Union) 84.46%; ▌William B. Zinn (Unknown) 10.75%; ▌Fontain Smith (Unknown) 4.38%; ▌W. S. Richardson (Unknown) 0.40%
West Virginia 3	Kellian Whaley	Republican– Union	1863	Incumbent re-elected.	▌ ✓ Kellian Whaley (Union) 66.79%; ▌John M. Phelps (Unknown) 33.21%

== Wisconsin ==
Wisconsin held elections on November 8, 1864.

District	Incumbent			This race	
District	Member	Party	First elected	Results	Candidates
Wisconsin 1	James S. Brown	Democratic	1862	Incumbent retired. Union gain.	▌ ✓ Halbert E. Paine (Union) 50.90%; ▌John W. Cary (Democratic) 49.10%
Wisconsin 2	Ithamar Sloan	Republican– Union	1862	Incumbent re-elected.	▌ ✓ Ithamar Sloan (Union) 60.31%; ▌George B. Smith (Democratic) 39.69%
Wisconsin 3	Amasa Cobb	Republican– Union	1862	Incumbent re-elected.	▌ ✓ Amasa Cobb (Union) 63.19%; ▌Charles Rodolf (Democratic) 36.81%
Wisconsin 4	Charles A. Eldredge	Democratic	1862	Incumbent re-elected.	▌ ✓ Charles A. Eldredge (Democratic) 58.93%; ▌A. Scott Sloan (Union) 41.07%
Wisconsin 5	Ezra Wheeler	Democratic	1862	Incumbent retired. Union gain.	▌ ✓ Philetus Sawyer (Union) 56.84%; ▌Gabriel Bouck (Democratic) 43.16%
Wisconsin 6	Walter D. McIndoe	Republican– Union	1862 (special)	Incumbent re-elected.	▌ ✓ Walter D. McIndoe (Union) 66.31%; ▌Henry Reed (Democratic) 33.69%

== Non-voting delegates ==
=== 38th Congress ===
District	Incumbent			This race	
District	Delegate	Party	First elected	Results	Candidates
Arizona Territory at-large	None (new seat)			New seat. Union gain.	▌ ✓ Charles D. Poston (Union) 58.08%; ▌Charles Lieb (Union) 25.54%; ▌William D. Bradshaw (Democratic) 7.46%; ▌William J. Berry (Unknown) 5.42%; ▌Sam Adams (Unknown) 3.50%
Montana Territory at-large	None (new seat)			New seat. Democratic gain.	▌ ✓ Samuel McLean (Democratic) 67.96%; ▌Wilbur F. Sanders (Union) 32.04%

=== 39th Congress ===
District	Incumbent			This race	
District	Delegate	Party	First elected	Results	Candidates
Arizona Territory at-large	Charles D. Poston	Republican– Union	1864	Incumbent lost re-election. Union hold.	▌ ✓ John N. Goodwin (Union) 54.98%; ▌Joseph P. Allyn (Democratic) 29.22%; ▌Charles D. Poston (Union) 15.80%
Colorado Territory at-large	Hiram P. Bennet	Republican– Union	1861	Incumbent retired. Anti-Statehood gain.	▌ ✓ Allen A. Bradford (Anti-Statehood) 62.04%; ▌John Chivington (Union) 37.96%
Dakota Territory at-large	John B. S. Todd	People's Union	1861 (Note: Todd successfully contested the election of William Jayne after being defeated for re-election in 1862 and was seated on June 18, 1864.)	Incumbent lost re-election. Union gain.	▌ ✓ Walter A. Burleigh (Union) 63.49%; ▌John B. S. Todd (People's Union) 36.51%
Idaho Territory at-large	William H. Wallace	Republican– Union	1863	Incumbent retired. Democratic gain.	▌ ✓ Edward D. Holbrook (Democratic) 53.33%; ▌Samuel C. Parks (Union) 46.67%
Montana Territory at-large	Samuel McLean	Democratic	1864	Incumbent re-elected.	▌ ✓ Samuel McLean (Democratic) 61.12%; ▌G. E. Upson (Union) 38.88%
Nebraska Territory at-large	Samuel G. Daily	Republican– Union	1860 (wc)	Incumbent retired. Union hold.	▌ ✓ Phineas Hitchcock (Union) 59.24%; ▌G. L. Miller (Democratic) 40.76%
Nevada Territory at-large	Gordon Newell Mott	Republican– Union	1862	Incumbent retired. Independent Union gain. Election voided by the admission of Nevada; see above.	▌ ✓ John Cradlebaugh (Independent Union) 43.41%; ▌A. C. Bradford (Democratic) 42.67%; ▌Thomas Fitch (Union) 13.87%; Scattering 0.04%
New Mexico Territory at-large	Francisco Perea	Republican– Union	1863	Incumbent lost re-election as a Democrat. Union hold.	▌ ✓ J. Francisco Chaves (Union) 57.93%; ▌Francisco Perea (Democratic) 42.07%
Utah Territory at-large	John F. Kinney	Democratic	1863	Incumbent retired. Democratic hold.	▌ ✓ William H. Hooper (Democratic) **
Washington Territory at-large	George E. Cole	Democratic	1863	Incumbent retired. Union gain.	▌ ✓ Arthur A. Denny (Union) 65.96%; ▌James Tilton (Democratic) 34.04%

== See also ==
- 1864 United States elections
  - 1864 United States presidential election
  - 1864–65 United States Senate elections
- 38th United States Congress
- 39th United States Congress

== Bibliography ==
=== Primary sources ===
- Evening Journal Almanac (1866). The Evening Journal Almanac: 1866. Albany.

=== Secondary sources ===
- Angel, Myron, ed. (1881). History of Nevada. Oakland, CA.
- Alexander, Thomas B. (1950). Political Reconstruction in Tennessee. New York: Russell and Russell.
- Dell, Christopher (1975). Lincoln and the War Democrats: The Grand Erosion of Conservative Tradition. Rutherford, NJ: Farleigh Dickenson University Press. ISBN 978-0-8386-1466-2.
- Dubin, Michael J. (1998). United States Congressional Elections, 1788-1997: The Official Results of the Elections of the 1st Through 105th Congresses. McFarland and Company. ISBN 978-0786402830.
- Ficklen, John Rose (1910). History of Reconstruction in Louisiana, through 1868. Baltimore: Johns Hopkins Press.
- Hoig, Stan (1961). The Sand Creek Massacre. Norman: University of Oklahoma Press.
- Hood, James Larry (July 1978). "For the Union: Kentucky's Unconditional Unionist Congressmen and the Development of the Republican Party in Kentucky, 1863–1865". Register of the Kentucky Historical Society. 76 (3): 197–215. JSTOR 23378981.
- Idaho State Historical Society (1985). "Idaho Territorial Election Returns, October 10, 1864" (PDF). Reference Series. Boise: Idaho State Historical Society.
- Kingsbury, George W. (1915). History of Dakota Territory. Vol. 1. Chicago: S. J. Clarke Publishing Company.
- Mering, John (April 1959). "The Political Transition of James S. Rollins". Missouri Historical Review. 53 (3): 217–226.
- McPherson, James M. (1988). Battle Cry of Freedom: The Civil War Era. New York: Oxford University.
- Parrish, William E. (1973). A History of Missouri, Volume 3: 1860 to 1875. Columbia: University of Missouri Press. ISBN 978-0-8262-0108-9.
- Sanders, Helen Fitzgerald (1913). A History of Montana. Vol. 1. Chicago: Lewis Publishing Company.
- Sheldon, Addison E., ed. (1918). The Nebraska Blue Book and Historical Register. Lincoln: Nebraska Legislative Reference Bureau.
- Smith, Adam I. P. (2006). No Party Now: Politics in the Civil War North. New York: Oxford University Press. ISBN 978-0-19-518865-3.
- Stone, William Fisk (1918). History of Colorado. Vol. 1. Chicago: S. J. Clarke Publishing Company.
- Taylor, J. M. (1898). History and Government of Washington [...]. St. Louis.
- Myron, Angel, ed. (1881). History of Nevada[...]. Oakland, CA.
- Wagoner, Jay J. (1970). Arizona Territory, 1863–1912: A Political History. Tucson: University of Arizona Press. ISBN 978-0-8165-0176-2.
- Whitney, Orson F. (1893). History of Utah. Vol. 2. Salt Lake City.
- "Party Divisions of the House of Representatives* 1789–Present". Office of the Historian, House of United States House of Representatives.
