= Joseph Christian =

Joseph Christian may refer to:

- Joseph Christian (judge) (1828–1905), State senate and supreme court justice from Virginia
- Joseph Christian Freiherr von Zedlitz (1790–1862), Austrian dramatist and epic poet
- Joseph Christian Lillie (1760–1827), Danish neoclassical architect and interior designer
- Johann Joseph Christian (1706–1777), German Baroque sculptor and woodcarver
- J. C. Leyendecker (Joseph Christian Leyendecker, 1874–1951), American illustrator
- Joseph-Christian-Ernest Bourret (1827–1896), French churchman, bishop and cardinal
