= Powell v. McCormack =

- Supreme Court of the United States

Argued April 21, 1969 Decided June 16, 1969
- Full case name: Adam Clayton Powell Jr., et al. v. John William McCormack, Speaker of the House of Representatives, et al.
- Citations: 395 U.S. 486 (more) 89 S. Ct. 1944; 23 L. Ed. 2d 491; 1969 U.S. LEXIS 3103

Case history
- Prior: 266 F. Supp. 354 (D.D.C. 1967); 395 F.2d 577 (D.C. Cir. 1968)

Holding
- The House of Representative may not exclude a duly elected representative for any reason unless it is mentioned in the Qualifications of Members Clause.

Court membership
- Chief Justice Earl Warren Associate Justices Hugo Black · William O. Douglas; John M. Harlan II · William J. Brennan Jr. Potter Stewart · Byron White; Thurgood Marshall

Case opinions
- Majority: Warren, joined by Black, Douglas, Harlan, Brennan, White, Marshall
- Concurrence: Douglas
- Dissent: Stewart

Laws applied
- U.S. Const. art. I § 2, cl. 2

Powell v. McCormack, 395 U.S. 486 (1969), is a United States Supreme Court case that held that the Qualifications of Members Clause of Article I of the US Constitution is an exclusive list of qualifications of members of the House of Representatives, which may exclude a duly elected member for only those reasons enumerated in that clause.

== Background ==
Adam Clayton Powell Jr., a senior member of the United States House of Representatives, was embroiled in scandal, specifically around allegations that he had refused to pay a judgment ordered by a New York court, misappropriated congressional travel funds, and paid his wife a congressional staff salary for work she had not done.

Powell was re-elected in the 1966 election. When the 90th Congress convened in January 1967, Speaker of the House John W. McCormack asked Representative Powell to abstain from taking the oath of office. The House adopted H.Res. 1, which stripped Powell of his House Committee chairmanship, excluded him from taking his seat, and created a select committee to investigate Powell's misdeeds. After the select committee conducted its investigation and hearings, in March 1967, the House adopted H.Res. 278 by a vote of 307 to 116, which excluded Powell from Congress and also censured him, fined him $25,000, took away his seniority, and declared his seat vacant.

Powell, along with 13 of his constituents, filed suit in the United States District Court for the District of Columbia, naming McCormack and five other representatives as defendants. He also named the Clerk of the House, the Sergeant at Arms, and the Doorkeeper. Most of these parties were named in an effort to get injunctions barring the enforcement of H. Res. 278:

- To prevent the Speaker from refusing to administer the oath of office
- To prevent the Clerk from "refusing to perform the duties due a Representative"
- To prevent the Sergeant at Arms from withholding Powell's salary
- To prevent the Doorkeeper from barring Powell from Congressional chambers

The suit claimed that excluding Powell amounted to an expulsion, but an expulsion would not have garnered the necessary two-thirds vote.

The district court dismissed the case for lack of subject-matter jurisdiction. The Court of Appeals for the D.C. Circuit reversed the district court. In an opinion by Warren E. Burger, soon to be Chief Justice of the United States, the court held that the federal courts did have subject-matter jurisdiction, but dismissed the case on two grounds: that Powell lacked standing to sue, and that the case represented a non-justiciable political question.

While the suit was making its way through the court system, Powell was re-elected in the 1968 election and was ultimately re-seated in the 91st Congress. The House adopted H.Res. 2, fining him $25,000 and removing his seniority. Because he was seated when his appeal came to the Supreme Court, the defendants argued that the case was moot.

In the aftermath of the decision, Congress passed the Federal Contested Elections Act to formalize the process for contesting elections in light of the Court ruling.

== Constitutional issues ==
- Congressional power to develop qualifications other than those specified (Art. I, § 2, cl. 1–2)
- Congressional power to exclude rather than impeach or expel (Art. I, § 2, cl. 5; Art. I, § 5, cl. 2)
- Judicial review vs. Congressional power to be the judge of its qualifications (Art. I, § 5, cl. 1)
- Supreme Court jurisdiction and justiciability (Art. III)
- Rights of the electorate to elect its representative

== Decision ==
=== Warren's majority opinion ===
The majority opinion was authored by Chief Justice Warren, and signed by Black, Brennan, Douglas, Harlan, Marshall, and White.

The opinion stated that the case was justiciable, and it did not constitute a political question that pitted one branch of government against another. Rather, it required "no more than an interpretation of the Constitution."

The opinion stated also that Congress being the sole judge of its members' qualifications (Art. I, § 5, cl. 1) and the Speech or Debate Clause (Art. I, § 6) do not preclude judicial review of Constitutional issues raised in the case (but not necessarily in all cases touching upon the subject of speech and debate or Congress's judging the qualifications of its members) because "no branch is supreme," and it is the duty of the court to ensure that all branches conform to the Constitution.

The majority opinion held that Congress does not have the power to develop qualifications other than those specified in Art. I, § 2, cl. 1–2.

Article I, section 5, of the U.S. Constitution states that "Each house shall be the judge of the... qualifications of its own members," but then immediately states that each House has the authority to expel a member "with the Concurrence of two thirds." The Court found that it had a "textually demonstrable commitment" to interpret the clause, which, in this case, the Court did. The Court's interpretation was that the subject clause meant that the process that led to the expulsion of a member, duly sworn and enrolled upon the body's rolls, was the only method for a House to give effect to its power to determine the qualifications of its members.

The Court reasoned that the authority of Congress in such instances is post facto: That is, the power to expel attaches only after a member-elect had been elected under the laws of the state in which the congressional district was located, and after said member-elect took the oath of office.

It was unclear whether a vote of two thirds would have been reached if the House resolution had specified expulsion (Art. I, § 2, cl. 5; Art. I, § 5, cl. 2) rather than exclusion. Thus, the Court found that Powell was wrongfully excluded from his seat.

The Court found that Congress is the whole body of initially candidate members who have been elected by the laws of the several states (in and for each state's apportioned congressional districts), who assemble at the seat of the federal government on the 3rd day of January after the preceding November's congressional elections. On that date, they are sworn in by their individual oaths of office and thereby collectively become the Nth Congress (89th, 95th, 105th, ...).

The Court did not reach, because it determined it did not need to in this case, the question of which Congress the Constitution was referring to that had the power to expel one of its members. The Court determined in this case that no Congress could exclude a future member, a candidate member, from being sworn in and taking a seat in the House. The Court found that if the Congress went beyond a determination that a candidate member had satisfied the Constitution's qualifications for membership and had been duly chosen by and through the laws of their state, it could not, under the Constitution, go further in examining and possibly rejecting a candidate member before administering the oath of office and seating him or her.

The Court did not explicitly decide whether a particular Congress (105th, 106th, etc.) had the power to expel an individual from a future Congress without that future Congress being required - after the re-election, the re-swearing in, and the re-seating of a formerly expelled member - to expel the member all over again. The Court, in effect, decided that states were not prohibited from putting on their congressional district ballots and the voters were not prohibited from electing an individual who had been expelled from a previous or current Congress. Once the Congress had satisfied itself that a candidate member had been presented to it, from a congressional district, in accordance with the congressional district's state constitution and laws but was not in conflict with the congressional qualifications set down in the US Constitution, the US Congress had an affirmative constitutional duty to administer the oath to, to swear in, and to enroll the candidate member as a member of Congress.

The challenge to the Court in its analysis and decision was devising a proper course of action that was both coordinate and consonant between the sovereign authorities (the Congress over itself and its members, the people and the states over the Congress) each in their own sphere, over the choosing of members to the Congress. The Court looked at the historical precedent of the House, the history of its candidate members, and the role of the states and their voters in choosing their representatives. The Court concluded that the US Constitution (the word and will of the people), the weight of history (the record of how the people have used their constitution), and the federal structure of the government (the role of the states in organizing and managing elections within their borders) required the Court to decide that the sovereign will of the people, as expressed in the democratic process, and the coordinate role of their states must be made consonant and held supreme, in the responsibility to create candidate members for the Congress.

The people, by their Constitution, affirmatively posited, defined, and delimited all qualifications for standing in elections for membership in the Congress. The states, under the 9th and 10th amendments explicitly retain unto themselves the power to make the laws for the government and regulation of elections for federal offices that are apportioned to them (the states) by the US Constitution. Therefore, the people and the states together have the sole authority for the creation, production, and generation of candidate members of the US Congress through the operation of the laws of the several states and the articles and clauses of the US Constitution. Thus, the Congress itself is a creation of and subordinate to this process. Congress's processes and procedures for the management, administration, and discipline of members (once they have taken the oath, been sworn, and entered upon the rolls) are constitutionally subordinate to the sovereignty of the people and the states respectively over the creation of the membership of Congress.

=== Douglas's concurring opinion ===
Justice Douglas wrote the only concurring opinion of this case. It stated that qualifications that are not part of the Constitution may not be added except by constitutional amendment. Therefore, Congress can exclude a member only by a two-thirds vote to expel.

=== Stewart's dissenting opinion ===
Justice Stewart wrote a dissenting opinion that said that the case should not have been heard by the Supreme Court because the case was moot, as Powell had already been seated in the 91st Congress by the time the case was appealed to the Supreme Court.

== See also ==
- List of United States Supreme Court cases, volume 395
- Unseated members of the United States Congress
- Federal Contested Elections Act
- U.S. Term Limits, Inc. v. Thornton (1995)
