= Federal Contested Elections Act =

United States law regarding House elections

The Federal Contested Elections Act of 1969 (2 U.S.C. §§ 381 et seq.) signed into law by President Richard Nixon on December 5, 1969 provides a procedure for candidates to the United States House of Representatives to contest general elections by filing with the Clerk of the House. The law delegates all matters involving contested elections first to the Committee on House Administration, which receives jurisdiction of such matters by the rules of the House.

== Constitutional basis ==
Article I, Section 5 of the Constitution states: "Each House shall be the Judge of the Elections, Returns and Qualifications of its own Members". As a result, the House or Senate have final authority to decide a contested election, although federal courts may intervene in very limited circumstances. In the Supreme Court case of 1969, Powell v. McCormack, a precedent was set with regard to the meaning of "qualifications", resulting in the finding that Representative Powell had been wrongfully excluded from his seat.

== Initiating examination of a contested election ==
The law explains the process: the filing of a notice of contest by the loser of the election, the taking of testimony from witnesses, and the holding of hearings on the depositions and papers filed with the Clerk of the House. The burden of proof lies on the challenger to produce sufficient evidence to change the outcome of the election. An examination of a contested election may also be initiated by any member on the floor who wishes to challenge the legitimacy of another member's taking of the oath of office. The challenge begins in the form of a resolution. It is then referred to the Committee on House Administration for review. Individual electors from the state in question may also petition the House for a review of the election.

== From Committee to House ==
After the Committee completes its examination of the election, it issues a report to the full House, in the form of a resolution with recommendations. The House then adopts or rejects this resolution by a majority vote. The precedents of the House state that the resolution can:

- dismiss the challenge
- declare which candidate is entitled to the seat
- assert that no one should be seated pending the completion of an investigation
- call for a new election to be held
- refute the challenger as not qualified to contest the election
- provide reimbursement for the contestants from the contingency fund of the House for costs incurred in the contested election process.

Recounts are undertaken if the election loser can show he has exhausted all appeals in the state courts under state law. However, the House has sometimes declined to order a recount if the state supreme court has already conducted one.

The resolution containing the Committee's recommendations is debated in the House. Amending is possible, but difficult. The resolution is subject to a motion to recommit (sending it back to committee) with instructions from the House to take further action. Adoption or defeat is by a majority vote of those present.

Prior to the Dornan v. Sanchez contest of a 1996 election, the House last considered a contested election in 1985: McIntyre v. McCloskey in the Indiana's 8th congressional district. While the State of Indiana certified the Republican, McIntyre, as the winner of the election, the House voted to seat the Democratic challenger, Frank McCloskey. A House-ordered recount gave McCloskey a 4-vote margin of victory.

== Standards of adjudication ==
The statute says little about the substantive standards for judging a notice of contest. Under the law, the candidate contesting the election must file a notice of contest within thirty days of state certification of the election results. The only substantive requirements for the notice are that the contestant must "state grounds sufficient to change [the] result of [the] election" and must "claim [the] right to [the] contestee's seat" in Congress. The contestee then has thirty days either to file an answer or to move for dismissal. The burden of proof rests with the contestant, who "must overcome the presumption of the regularity of an election, and its results, evidenced by the certificate of election presented by the contestee." The law also sets forth procedures for an adversarial system of taking depositions and other discovery. Traditionally, the Committee on House Administration appoints a bipartisan three-member task force to investigate and report on proceedings under the law. Generally, the task force investigates the contest and makes a recommendation to the Committee on House Administration, which then issues a report and sends a resolution to the full House regarding the disposition of the contest. "The committee may recommend, and the House may approve by a simple majority vote, a decision affirming the right of the contestee to the seat, may seat the contestant, or find that neither party is entitled to be finally seated and declare a vacancy."

== See also ==
- Unseated members of the United States Congress
