= William McKee Dunn =

American general and politician (1814–1887)

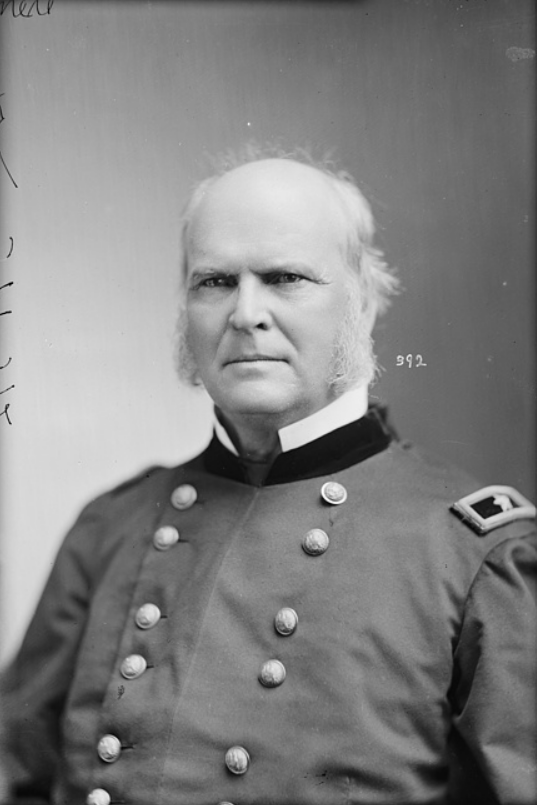
- Dunn, 1865–1880

Judge Advocate General of the United States Army
- In office December 1, 1875 – January 22, 1881
- President: Ulysses S. Grant; Rutherford B. Hayes
- Preceded by: Joseph Holt
- Succeeded by: David G. Swaim

Member of the U.S. House of Representatives from Indiana's 3rd district
- In office March 4, 1859 – March 3, 1863
- Preceded by: James Hughes
- Succeeded by: Henry W. Harrington

Personal details
- Born: December 12, 1814 Hanover, Indiana, U.S.
- Died: July 24, 1887 (aged 72) Dunn Loring, Virginia, U.S.
- Resting place: Oak Hill Cemetery; Georgetown, Washington, D.C.
- Party: Republican

Military service
- Allegiance: United States of America; Union
- Branch/service: United States Army; Union Army
- Years of service: 1863–1881
- Rank: Brigadier General
- Commands: Judge Advocate General of the Army
- Battles/wars: American Civil War; American Indian Wars

William McKee Dunn (December 12, 1814 – July 24, 1887) was a U.S. representative from Indiana and the Judge Advocate General of the United States Army.

== Early life and career ==
William McKee Dunn was born December 12, 1814, in Hanover in the Territory of Indiana to Williamson Dunn, one of the founders of Hanover College, and Miriam Wilson Dunn. Dunn attended school in the first schoolhouse in Hanover. He graduated from Indiana College in 1832 and became a professor of mathematics at Hanover College. In 1835, Dunn received an AM from Yale University. He subsequently studied law and was admitted to the bar in 1837. He then established a legal practice in Madison, Indiana.

Dunn was elected a member of the Indiana House of Representatives in 1848. He was delegate to the state constitutional convention in 1850. He was elected as a Republican to the Thirty-sixth and Thirty-seventh Congresses. He served from March 4, 1859, until March 3, 1863. In 1860 during a campaign rally in Philadelphia, Dunn drew Lincoln's appreciation for publicly arguing Lincoln was "of the Old Hickory stamp," thereby making a favorable comparison to Andrew Jackson. He served as chairman of the Committee on Patents (Thirty-seventh Congress). He was an unsuccessful candidate for reelection in 1862 to the Thirty-eighth Congress.

== Civil War ==
During the early part of the American Civil War, in addition to his congressional duties, Dunn served in the Union Army as a volunteer aide-de-camp to General George B. McClellan from June 19, 1861, to August 1861, in the campaign in western Virginia.

Following his unsuccessful bid to remain in Congress, Dunn accepted a military commission from the Governor of Indiana, fellow Republican Oliver P. Morton. He was a major and judge advocate general in the Department of the Missouri from March 13, 1863, until July 6, 1864. He was appointed lieutenant colonel and Assistant Judge Advocate General of the United States Army on June 22, 1864. This placed him second in rank in the Army's Judge Advocate General's Department, only behind General Joseph Holt. At the end of the war, he was brevetted as a brigadier general dating from March 13, 1865.

== Postbellum career ==
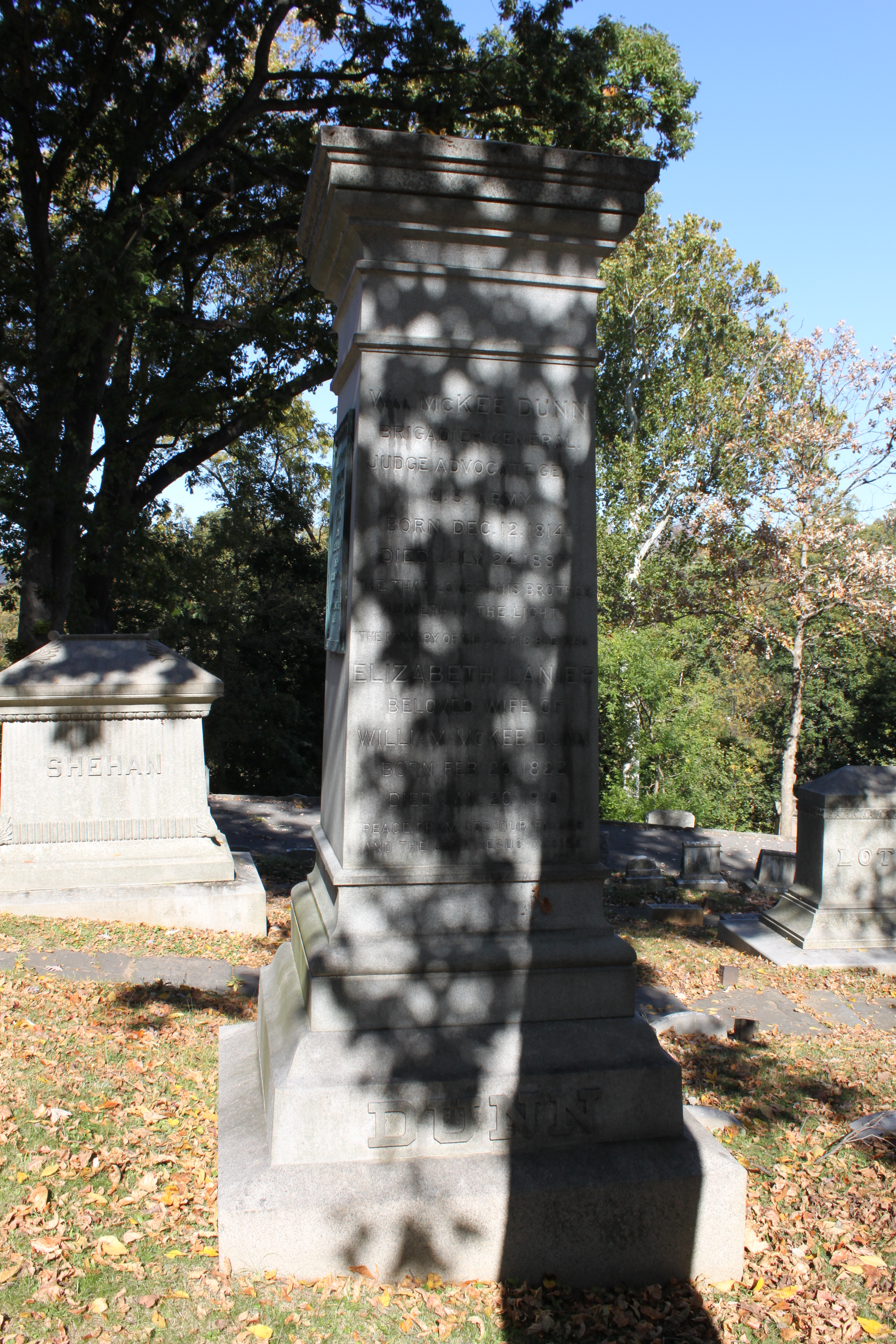
Grave of Dunn at Oak Hill Cemetery

Following the Civil War, Dunn stayed in the Regular Army. He was promoted to brigadier general and Judge Advocate General on December 1, 1875. He retired from the army on January 22, 1881.

He died at his summer residence, "Maplewood," in Dunn Loring, Fairfax County, Virginia, on July 24, 1887. He was interred in Oak Hill Cemetery, Washington, D.C.

U.S. House of Representatives
Preceded by James Hughes	Member of the U.S. House of Representatives from Indiana's 3rd congressional district 1859-1863	Succeeded by Henry W. Harrington
