= Samuel K. Casey =

American politician

Samuel King Casey (June 27, 1818 – May 31, 1871) was an American politician.

Case was born in Smith County, Tennessee. He moved with his parents to Illinois Territory and eventually settle in Jefferson County, Illinois. Casey went to McKendree College and was a member of the Philosophical Literary Society. He served as county judge for Franklin County, Illinois and served as the warden for the Illinois Penitentiary. Casey was a farmer and lived in Mount Vernon, Illinois. Casey served in the Illinois Senate from 1868 until his death in 1871 and was a Democrat. He died at his home in Mount Vernon, Illinois. His father was Zadok Casey, the Governor of Illinois.
