= Ralph Hill (politician) =

American attorney and politician from Indiana

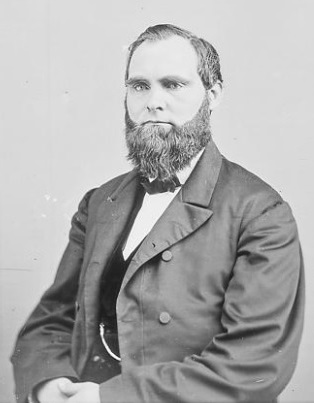

Member of the U.S. House of Representatives from Indiana's 3rd district
- In office March 4, 1865 – March 3, 1867
- Preceded by: Henry W. Harrington
- Succeeded by: Morton C. Hunter

Personal details
- Born: October 12, 1827 Trumbull County, Ohio, U.S.
- Died: August 20, 1899 (aged 71) Indianapolis, Indiana, U.S
- Resting place: Crown Hill Cemetery and Arboretum, Section 27, Lot 159
- Party: Republican

Ralph Hill (October 12, 1827 – August 20, 1899) was an American educator, lawyer, and politician who served one term as a United States representative from Indiana from 1865 to 1867.

== Biography ==
Hill was born in Trumbull County, Ohio, where he attended the district school. He also attended the Kinsman Academy and the Grand River Institute in Austinburg, Ohio. Later, he taught school in 1846, 1847, 1849, and 1850 before he studied law at the New York State and National Law School in Ballston, New York, and was admitted to the bar in Albany, New York, in 1851.

Hill returned to Jefferson, Ohio, in August 1851 and practiced law. He established a select school at Austinburg in November 1851 before he resumed the practice of law in Jefferson, Ohio, in March 1852. Later, he moved to Columbus, Indiana, in August 1852 and continued the practice of law.

=== Congress ===
Hill was elected as a Republican to the Thirty-ninth Congress (March 4, 1865 – March 3, 1867) but was not a candidate for renomination in 1866.

=== Later career and death ===
Upon leaving Congress, he served as the collector of internal revenue for the third district of Indiana from 1869 to 1875. He moved to Indianapolis, Indiana, in 1879 and resumed the practice of law. He died in Indianapolis on August 20, 1899, and was buried in Crown Hill Cemetery.

U.S. House of Representatives
| Preceded by Henry W. Harrington | Member of the U.S. House of Representatives from Indiana's 3rd congressional district 1865-1867 | Succeeded by Morton C. Hunter |
