= Henry W. Harrington =

American politician

Henry Harrington
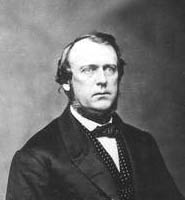

Member of the U.S. House of Representatives from Indiana's 3rd district
- In office March 4, 1863 – March 3, 1865
- Preceded by: William M. Dunn
- Succeeded by: Ralph Hill

Personal details
- Born: September 12, 1825 Cooperstown, New York, U.S.
- Died: March 20, 1882 (aged 56) Indianapolis, Indiana, U.S
- Party: Democratic

Henry William Harrington (September 12, 1825 – March 20, 1882) was an American lawyer and politician who served one term as a U.S. representative from Indiana from 1863 to 1865.

== Early life and education ==
Born near Cooperstown, New York, Harrington attended the common schools and in 1845 entered Temple Hill Academy, Livingston County, New York, where he remained for three years. He studied law in Geneseo.

== Career ==
He was admitted to the bar in 1848 and commenced practice in Nunda, New York.

He moved to Madison, Indiana, in 1856 and continued the practice of law. He moved to St. Louis, Missouri, in 1872. He returned to Indiana in 1874, settled in Indianapolis, and resumed the practice of law.

=== Political career ===
He served as delegate to the Democratic National Conventions in 1860, 1868, and 1872.

Harrington was elected as a Democrat to the Thirty-eighth Congress (March 4, 1863 – March 3, 1865). He was an unsuccessful candidate for reelection in 1864 to the Thirty-ninth Congress.

He served as collector of internal revenue for the third district of Indiana from October 27, 1866, to March 3, 1867.

In 1876, Harrington ran unsuccessfully as the Greenback Party candidate for governor of Indiana, coming in third place after Democrat James D. Williams and Republican Benjamin Harrison, with only 12,710 votes.

He again engaged in the practice of law.

== Death ==
He died in Indianapolis, Indiana, March 20, 1882. He was interred in Evergreen Cemetery, Alpena, Michigan.

== Bibliography ==
- United States Congress. "Henry W. Harrington (id: H000229)". Biographical Directory of the United States Congress.

U.S. House of Representatives
Preceded by William M. Dunn	Member of the U.S. House of Representatives from Indiana's 3rd congressional district 1863-1865	Succeeded by Ralph Hill
