= Hiram Cassedy =

Mississippi judge (1820–1881)

Hiram Cassedy Sr. (September 7, 1820 - March 26, 1881) was a judge and state legislator in Mississippi. He served as Speaker of the Mississippi House of Representatives from 1854 to 1856. He served several terms in the Mississippi House. He represented Franklin County, Mississippi.

He was born in Chambersburg, Pennsylvania.

Hiram Cassedy Jr. (July 4, 1846 - ?) served as a state senator from Pike County, Mississippi in 1872 and 1873 and served as a circuit judge.

== See also ==
- Reconstruction era
