= John G. Pratt =

American Civil War militia officer (1816–1866)

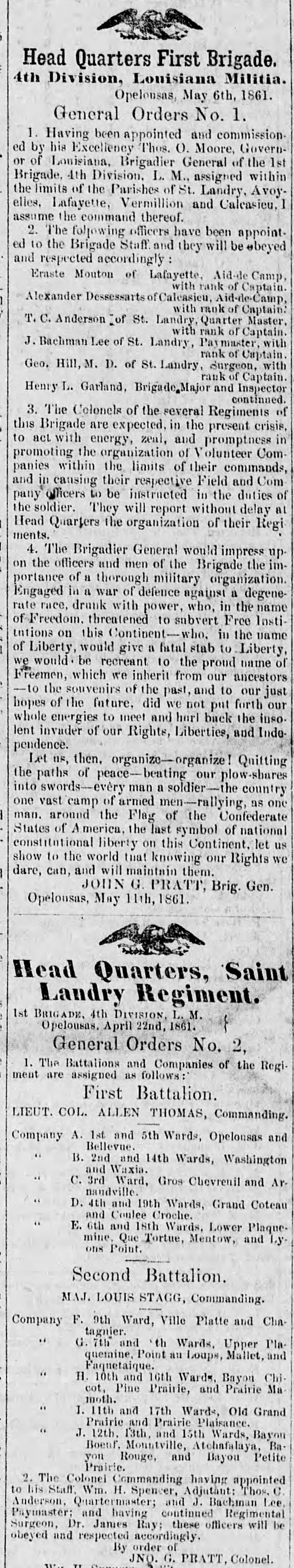
News items in the Opelousas Patriot about the organization of the Saint Landry Regiment of the Louisiana Militia by John G. Pratt, 1861

John Galbraith Pratt (March 31, 1816 – July 10, 1866) was a brigadier general of the Louisiana state militia during the Confederate States of America. Somewhat unusually for a militant Confederate, he was born and died in Connecticut, United States.

Pratt's family moved from Hartford, Connecticut to Saint Landry Parish, Louisiana in 1845, where Pratt owned a sugarcane plantation. At the time of his death his "magnificent plantation" at Bellevue was said to be "eight hundred superficial arpents" with a "splendid dwelling house" and "complete improvements." Pratt was a "delegate to the Democratic convention that nominated Stephen A. Douglas for president in 1860." Five days after Fort Sumter he was given command of the fourth brigade of the first division of the Louisiana state militia. Camp Pratt, a Confederate boot camp at New Iberia, Louisiana, was named for him.

In 1862, a unit he commanded, composed of irregular militia and Partisan Rangers, recruited from the parishes of St. Charles, Terrebonne and Rapides, botched an attempt to hijack a New Orleans, Opelousas, and Great Western Railway train. Pratt was arrested by Union soldiers in Louisiana and held as a prisoner of war for a time in 1863. He was one of three major contributors to an 1865 narrative account published by Confederate Louisiana state governor Henry Watkins Allen called Official report relative to the conduct of federal troops in western Louisiana, during the invasions of 1863 and 1864.

In 1865 Pratt was a declared candidate for a seat in the U.S. Congress from Louisiana's 4th Congressional district. He died in Portland, Connecticut, in 1866 and is buried in Trinity Church Cemetery in Middlesex County.

== See also ==
- List of American Civil War generals (Confederate) § State militia generals
