= Unseated members of the United States Congress =

Members of the United States Congress who were denied their seat after an election

Both houses of the United States Congress have refused to seat new members based on Article I, Section 5 of the United States Constitution which states that:

"Each House shall be the judge of the elections, returns and qualifications of its own members, and a majority of each shall constitute a quorum to do business; but a smaller number may adjourn from day to day, and may be authorized to compel the attendance of absent members, in such manner, and under such penalties as each House may provide."

This had been interpreted that members of the House of Representatives and of the Senate could refuse to recognize the election or appointment of a new representative or senator for any reason, often political heterodoxy or criminal record.

However, the U.S. Supreme Court, in Powell v. McCormack (1969), limited the powers of the Congress to refuse to seat an elected member to when the individual does not meet the specific constitutional requirements of age, citizenship or residency. From the decision by Chief Justice Earl Warren: "Therefore, we hold that, since Adam Clayton Powell Jr., was duly elected by the voters of the 18th Congressional District of New York and was not ineligible to serve under any provision of the Constitution, the House was without power to exclude him from its membership."

The Federal Contested Elections Act of 1969 currently lays out the procedures by which each House determines contested elections.

== Unseated members of Congress ==
=== 1868–1900: Post-Civil-War South ===
- On November 3, 1868, John Willis Menard, a Republican Creole of color, won a special election in Louisiana's 2nd congressional district to fill the seat of James Mann who died in office. Menard's challenger, Democrat Caleb S. Hunt, contested the election and appealed to the House that he be seated instead of Menard. In February 1869, the House suspended its rules to consider which man to seat, but ultimately could not reach a resolution and left the seat vacant for the remainder of Mann's term.
- From 1869 to 1900, the House of Representatives refused to seat over 30 Southern Democratic candidates declared the winner by their states. In some cases they weren't seated because the House Elections Committee concluded that fraud, violence, or intimidation had been used against black voters, or, in some cases, that the election statutes of the states themselves were unconstitutional. (Giles v. Harris (1903) ended the latter practice.) In some cases a new election was ordered, while in others the Republican or Populist candidate "defeated" by fraud was seated instead.
- In some cases the members were refused because the House did not agree the state was entitled to them. A number of southern states upon readmission claimed that since their slaves were emancipated and thus no longer counted as only 3/5th, they were entitled to larger delegations in the House. South Carolina was one state that elected members, such as Johann Peter Martin Epping, to fill its "additional" seats. However the House refused to seat them.

Members not seated under the Disqualification Clause during this period include:

- 1868: John Christy (Representative from Georgia)
- 1870: Zebulon Vance (Senator from North Carolina)

=== 1872–1907: Utah Mormons ===
- In 1872, George Q. Cannon (R-Utah) was elected as the non-voting delegate for Utah Territory to the House of Representatives. He remained a duly-elected congressional delegate until 1882, when his seat was declared vacant by the enactment of the anti-Mormon Edmunds Act.
- B. H. Roberts (D-Utah) was not seated after being elected in 1898 to the House of Representatives for the 56th United States Congress because he was a Mormon polygamist.
- Reed Smoot (R-Utah) was initially not seated after being elected in 1902 to the Senate for the 58th United States Congress because he was a top leader in the Church of Jesus Christ of Latter-day Saints (LDS Church) and had allegedly sworn an oath against the United States government. The continuing controversy of polygamy (though Smoot was not a polygamist) played a part. After a four-year investigation, he was seated.

=== 1899–1926: Contested elections and criminal charges ===
- William A. Clark (D-Montana) was elected to the U.S. Senate in 1899, but promptly met with a petition opposing his election on the grounds that it was secured through bribery. Votes were bought through real estate purchases, bank financing and outright cash purchases. The Senate Committee on Privileges and Elections found unanimously that Clark was not entitled to his seat. Clark resigned in May 1900 before the full Senate took a vote. Clark would serve a term in Congress from 1901 to 1907.
- Victor L. Berger (SP-Wisconsin) was not seated after his election to the House in 1918 because he had been convicted under the Espionage Act of 1917. After the House refused to seat him, Wisconsin held a special election in December 1919, which Berger won again. The House again refused to seat him. After the Supreme Court overturned his conviction in 1921 in Berger v. United States, he was again elected and served three successive terms in the House, from 1923 to 1929.
- Frank L. Smith (R-Illinois), was refused seating in the United States Senate due to allegations of election fraud in the 1926 United States Senate election in Illinois.
- William Scott Vare (R-Pennsylvania), a political boss better known as the "Duke of Philadelphia", won the 1926 United States Senate election in Pennsylvania. However, Governor Gifford Pinchot (R), whom he defeated in the primary, refused to seat Vare, testifying before Senate that Vare rigged the Republican primary with thousands of illegal paper ballots. Vare's Democratic opponent, William B. Wilson, also testified that Vare padded registration lists, employed phantom voters, and intimidated voters during the general election. In December 1929, the Senate voted 58–22 to deny the Senate seat to Vare, arguing not that Vare had committed voter fraud, but rather that Vare had spent excessively to win the nomination. Governor John S. Fisher appointed Joseph R. Grundy to the vacant Senate seat.

=== 1967–2009: Contested elections and corruption charges ===
- Adam Clayton Powell Jr. (D-New York), a sitting representative, was excluded by the House of Representatives in 1967 because of allegations of corruption. He sued to retain his seat in a landmark Supreme Court decision (see Powell v. McCormack), but was later re-elected and seated in 1969 before litigation was concluded.
- Louis C. Wyman (R-New Hampshire) was declared the victor of the US Senate contest in 1974 in New Hampshire by a narrow margin on Election Day (355 votes). A first recount gave the election instead to John A. Durkin (D-New Hampshire) by ten votes, but a second recount swung the result back to Wyman by only two votes. The state of New Hampshire certified Wyman as the winner, but Durkin appealed to the Senate, which had a sixty-vote Democratic majority. The Senate refused to seat Wyman while considering the matter. After a long and contentious debate in the Senate, with Republicans filibustering attempts by the Democratic majority to seat Durkin instead, a special election was held, with Durkin winning handily and becoming Senator.
- Roland Burris (D-Illinois), due to the Rod Blagojevich corruption charges, was initially refused a seat in the Senate in 2009. On December 30, 2008, Governor Blagojevich announced that he was naming Burris to the seat, and Illinois Secretary of State Jesse White registered the appointment in the official records of Illinois on December 31, 2008. However, Secretary of State White declined to sign the Senate's certification form. Because of this, on January 5, 2009, Secretary of the United States Senate Nancy Erickson rejected Burris's certificate of appointment to the Senate as invalid, citing Senate Rule 2 as the reason for the rejection. Burris appeared in Washington at the January Congressional swearing-in ceremony on January 6 to claim his seat, but was denied entry into the Senate chambers. Following an Illinois Supreme Court ruling on January 9, 2009, White provided Burris with a certified copy of the appointment's registration, and Burris delivered that copy, bearing the State Seal, to the Secretary of the Senate. On January 12, 2009, after the Secretary of the Senate announced that she and Senate Parliamentarian Alan Frumin deemed Burris's new credentials valid, Senate leaders decided to seat Burris. Burris was sworn in by President of the Senate Dick Cheney on January 15, 2009.

== See also ==
- List of United States representatives-elect who never took their seats
- Unseating
