= Joseph Christian (judge) =

American judge (1828–1905)

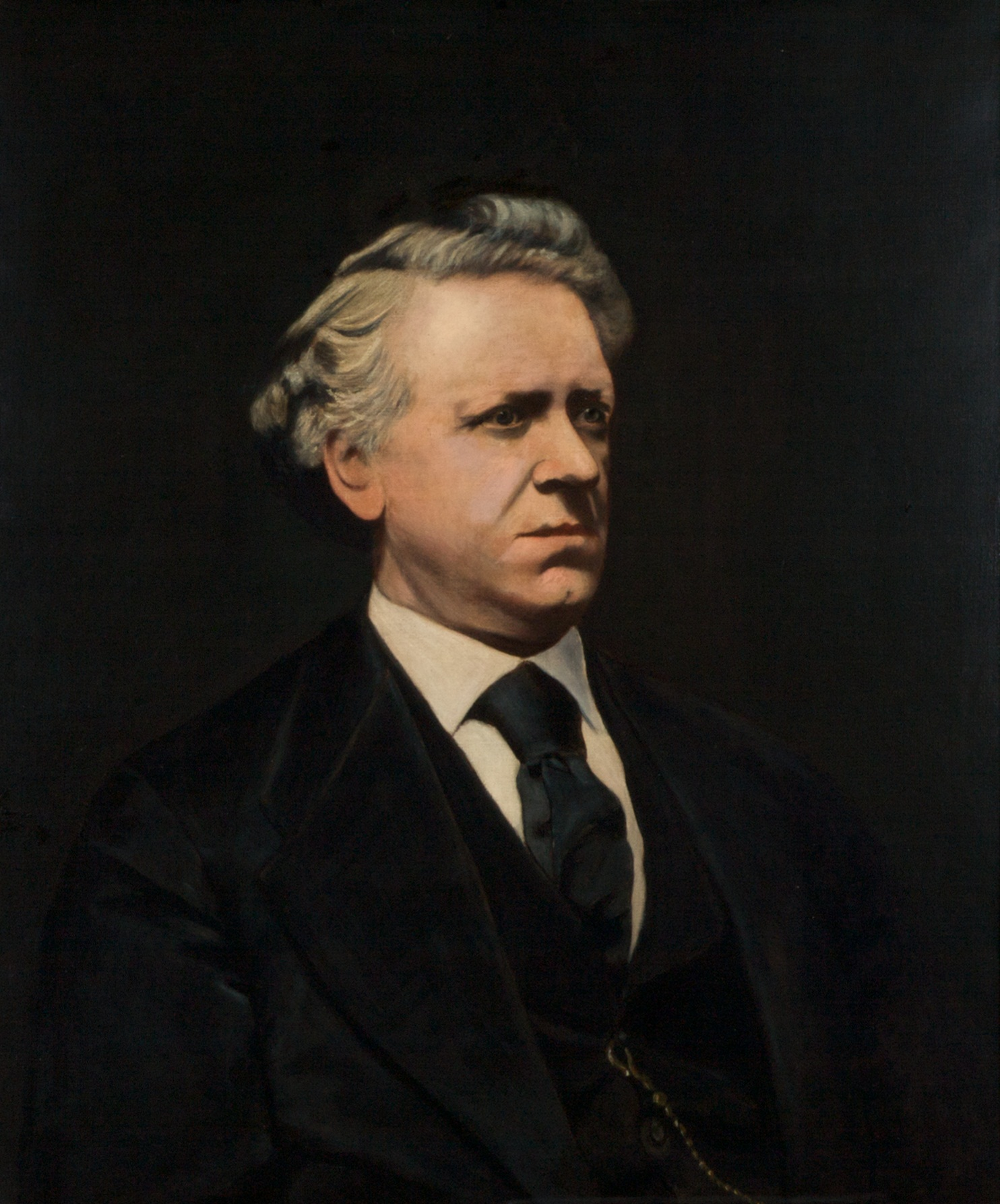
Oil on canvas portrait of Judge Joseph Christian

Joseph Christian (July 28, 1828 – May 29, 1905) was born in Middlesex County, Virginia. He was educated at Columbian College (now George Washington University) in Washington, D. C. and studied law at Staunton, Virginia. Admitted to the bar at the age of 21, he started practicing law in Middlesex and adjoining counties. In 1858, he was elected to the Virginia State Senate and served as a Senator during the American Civil War. He was elected circuit judge in 1866, for the circuit composed of the counties of Middlesex, Gloucester, Matthews, James City, Warwick, New Kent, Charles City and Henrico. He moved to Richmond in 1869 and formed a law partnership with William T. Joynes. This partnership lasted until January 1, 1870, when both partners were elected to the Supreme Court of Appeals. Judge Christian served on the bench for twelve years. Being defeated for re-election in 1882, he returned to private practice. He died in Richmond.
