= Louisville Home Guard =

Union military unit in the American Civil War

The Louisville Home Guard was a pro-Union military unit organized early in the American Civil War in Louisville, Kentucky. The auxiliary militia served to help secure supplies of arms and weapons, as well as to patrol the streets and discourage Confederate sympathizers.

The original Home Guard militia was commanded by John M. Delph, the mayor of Louisville. When the Confederate states seceded, he demanded the keys to the state magazine to secure the supply of weapons and ammunition from seizure. In the autumn of 1861, various city militia companies were organized into a single battalion under Lovell Rousseau, but they were not formally mustered into the Union army and remained under local control. Rousseau resigned on July 10, 1861, to enter Federal service and raise two formal regiments at Camp Joe Holt, including the Louisville Legion. James Speed, who would later serve as Attorney General under President Abraham Lincoln, became the new commander of the Louisville Home Guard. Poorly armed and scarcely trained, the guards were mostly for show, but they did man the earthworks and entrenchments around Louisville and help keep the peace.

On September 18, 1861, the Louisville Home Guard (nearly 1000-men strong under the command of Hamilton Pope) and Rousseau's two regiments left the city via train. They "went off excited and exasperated, yet collected, cool, and firm, and without noise or bluster." They subsequently marched south under the command of William T. Sherman toward Bowling Green to intercept the advancing Confederate forces of Simon Bolivar Buckner. Buckner halted in the city, and Sherman was content to monitor the larger and better organized enemy for the next three months while the Home Guards returned to Louisville.

The Home Guard patrolled several roads leading southward from Louisville, as well as railroad and road bridges, which were a particular target for Confederate raiders such as John Hunt Morgan.

From September 14–16, 1862, the Louisville Home Guard participated in the siege and surrender of Confederate-held Munfordsville and Woodsonville. They were part of a 4,000-man force of Indiana, Kentucky, and Ohio troops, as well as part of the 18th U.S. Infantry.

== See also ==
- Home Guard (Union)
- Louisville in the American Civil War
