= Eric LeVine =

American entrepreneur based in Seattle (born 1969)

Eric A. LeVine
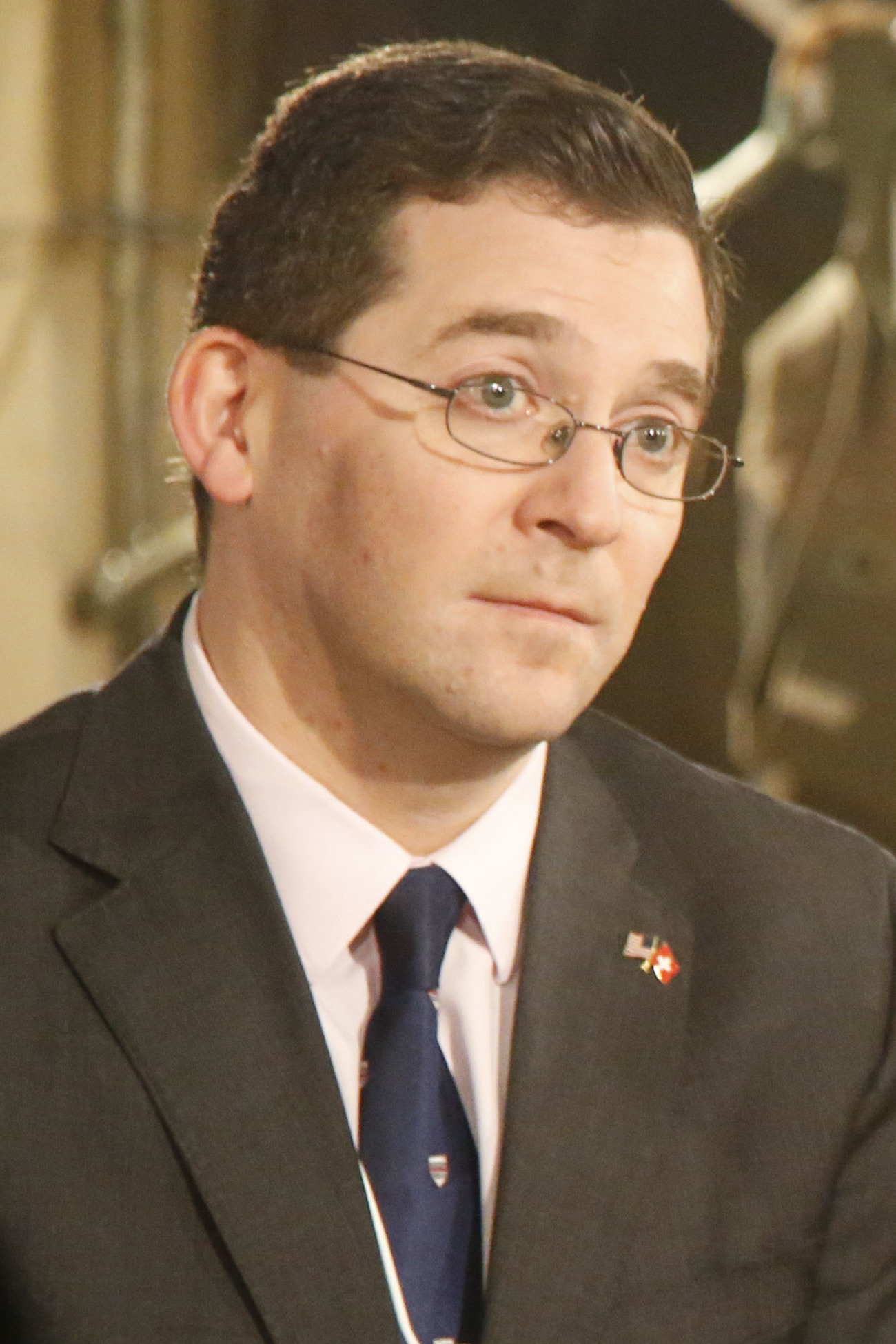
- LeVine in 2016
- Born: November 8, 1969 (age 56); Boston, Massachusetts
- Education: Harvard College
- Occupation: CEO
- Employer: CellarTracker
- Spouse: Suzan G. LeVine
- Children: Sidney and Talia LeVine

Eric A. LeVine (born November 8, 1969) is an American entrepreneur based in Seattle. He has been the founder and CEO of CellarTracker since 2003. He has been a Council Member at the United States Holocaust Memorial Museum since September, 2016.

== Early life ==
LeVine currently lives in Seattle, Washington with his wife, Suzan G. LeVine who served as United States Ambassador to Switzerland and Liechtenstein from 2014 to 2017, and their 2 children, Sidney and Talia LeVine.
