= Senator Winchester =

Senator Winchester may refer to:

- Boyd Winchester (1836–1923), Kentucky State Senate
- James Winchester (1752–1826), Tennessee State Senate
