= Richard Fredericks =

Richard Fredericks may refer to:

- Richard Fredricks (born 1933), American opera singer
- J. Richard Fredericks, United States ambassador
