= Jeffrey R. Cellars =

American diplomat

United States Ambassador to Switzerland and Liechtenstein Acting
- In office July 22, 2013 – June 2, 2014
- President: Barack Obama
- Preceded by: Don Beyer
- Succeeded by: Suzan G. LeVine

Personal details
- Spouse: Bethanne Loncasty
- Children: Joyce Cellars; Amelia Cellars
- Education: Wesleyan University (B.A.); Stanford University (M.A.)
- Occupation: Diplomat

Jeffrey R. Cellars is an American diplomat who served as U.S. Chargé d'Affaires to Switzerland and Liechtenstein, after succeeding Don Beyer on July 1, 2013. Cellars is a career member of the Senior Foreign Service and has 24 years of experience in Europe and the Middle East.

== Diplomatic career ==
From 1994–1997, Cellars worked in Washington D. C. as the special assistant to the Director of Defense Trade Controls and then as the Assignments Officer for the Near East and South Asia Bureau. His other overseas postings included Budapest, Hungary; Manama, Bahrain; Munich, Germany; and Nicosia, Cyprus. Cellars has been a recipient of Department of State’s Superior Honor Award three times.

From 2004-2005, Jeffrey R. Cellars worked in the German Foreign Ministry as a Transatlantic Exchange Diplomat, and had a follow-on assignment as the Management Officer at the U.S. Embassy in Berlin. In the U.S. Embassy in Berlin, he was the Embassy liaison officer to the White House during the G8 Summit.

He served as Management Counselor at the U.S. Embassy in Belgrade from 2009 to 2012 and oversaw the move to the new Embassy.

== Personal life ==
Before joining the State Department in 1989, Mr. Cellars worked as a financial analyst at Bank of America, a technical writer at Apple Computer, and a consultant to IBM in Vienna, Austria.

Cellars lives in California. He received a B.A. in Classics from Wesleyan University and an M.A. in Classics from Stanford University.

He is married to Bethanne Loncasty of San Jose, California, and has two daughters, Joyce and Amelia.

He speaks German, Hungarian, and Serbo-Croatian.
