= Washington State Employment Security Department =

U.S. state government agency

Agency overview
- Formed: 1947
- Jurisdiction: State of Washington
- Employees: 2,300 (2023)
- Annual budget: $945.3 million (2023-2025)
- Agency executive: Suzan G. LeVine, Commissioner
- Website: esd.wa.gov

The Washington State Employment Security Department is a government agency for the U.S. state of Washington that is tasked with management of the unemployment system. It was established by the Washington State Legislature in 1947, replacing an earlier system. The department has been led by commissioner Suzan G. LeVine, the former U.S. Ambassador to Switzerland and Liechtenstein, since 2018.

== History ==
The Washington State Department of Social Security was created by the legislature in 1937 with divisions to manage the state's unemployment benefits and employment offices. It was originally located in the Old Capitol Building in Olympia but outgrew its offices and was later furnished a separate headquarters building in January 1947. The Department of Social Security was reorganized into the Employment Security Department in the 1947 legislative session. The department used large computers to process payments and data; by 1957, it had 65 IBM machines with 440,000 punch cards to process records for 600,000 workers in the state.

During the COVID-19 pandemic in 2020, the state unemployment system was the target of an international fraud scheme from Nigeria that cost over $650 million in losses. The system had processed claims for 30.8 percent of civilian workers in Washington, the highest of any state in the United States. The fraud ring, named Scattered Canary by security researchers, had also filed fraudulent unemployment claims in six other states and is under investigation from the U.S. Department of Justice. By early June, the state government had recovered $333 million out of the $650 million lost to the fraud scheme. The ESD had also implemented stricter reviews for unemployment claims that were later rolled back. In August, the ESD announced that benefits for 86,449 fraudulent accounts totaling $576 million had been paid out, of which $340 million had been recovered.

The ESD's trust fund originally held $4.7 billion in March 2020, but was reduced to $2.8 billion within three months and is expected to be depleted by 2021.
