= Senator Grove =

Senator Grove may refer to:

- Shannon Grove (born 1965), California State Senate
- Tamara Grove (born 1970), South Dakota State Senate

== See also ==
- Senator Grover (disambiguation)
