= M. Larry Lawrence =

American diplomat (1926–1996)

United States Ambassador to Switzerland and Liechtenstein
- In office February 9, 1994 – January 9, 1996
- President: Bill Clinton
- Preceded by: Joseph Bernard Gildenhorn
- Succeeded by: Madeleine M. Kunin

Personal details
- Born: Maurice Larry Lawrence; August 16, 1926 Chicago, Illinois, U.S.
- Died: January 9, 1996 (aged 69) Bern, Switzerland
- Resting place: El Camino Memorial Park, Sorrento Valley, San Diego
- Party: Democratic
- Spouse(s): Geraldine Slesnick (m. 1949); Sheila Davis (fourth wife, m. 1990)
- Children: 3
- Occupation: Real estate developer

Maurice Larry Lawrence (August 16, 1926 – January 9, 1996) was a United States Ambassador to Switzerland and real estate developer. In 1991, Forbes magazine named Lawrence among the 400 richest Americans and estimated his fortune at $315 million.

== Family ==
Lawrence was born in Chicago, Illinois to Tillie (née Astor, 1900–1970) and Sidney Arthur Lawrence (1901–1963). He was descended from Jewish immigrants from what was then the Russian Empire.

== Education and early career ==
Lawrence attended Wilbur Wright College in 1945 and the University of Arizona from 1945 through 1947. A biography entry for Lawrence appeared in Who's Who indicating he had graduated from the University of Arizona in 1947 with a bachelor of arts degree. The university said, however, that Lawrence attended classes there for two years and played varsity football, but left without a degree.

He moved to San Diego, California in 1953.

== Real estate career ==
San Diego millionaire John Alessio sold the deteriorating Hotel del Coronado to Lawrence in 1963. Lawrence's initial plan was to develop the land around the hotel and ultimately, to demolish it. Lawrence later changed his mind. During his tenure, Lawrence invested $150 million to refurbish and expand much of the hotel. He doubled its capacity to 700 rooms. He added the Grande Hall Convention Center and two seven-story Ocean Towers just south of the hotel. Lawrence was known to have to have claimed that L. Frank Baum wrote part of The Wonderful Wizard of Oz at the hotel and that Thomas Edison supervised the wiring of parts of the hotel, neither of which was true. The Lawrence family sold the hotel to the Travelers Group after his death in 1996.

== Politics ==
Lawrence's first involvement in politics was his work in the 1948 Adlai Stevenson II gubernatorial campaign in Illinois. He continued his political activities in California, gaining power and influence in Democratic political circles as a campaign contributor and fund-raiser.

He was a delegate to the Democratic National Convention from California in 1964, 1968 and 1972.

In October 1993, U.S. President Bill Clinton announced his intention to nominate Lawrence to be U.S. Ambassador to Switzerland and his intention to appoint Sheila Davis Lawrence to be Special U.S. Representative to the World Conservation Union. He was confirmed as ambassador in March 1994.

In 1994, the Federal Election Commission ruled that Lawrence exceeded a $25,000 limit on the amount an individual can give to help finance an election campaign in one year. As a result, he was fined $7,179, the amount of his excess contributions. In a letter to the commission, Lawrence said he was unaware that some of his 1987 contributions counted toward the 1988 total.

== Personal life ==
In 1949, Lawrence married Geraldine Slesnick, with whom he had three children. He was in his fourth marriage at the time of his death, to the former Sheila Davis from Brush Fork, West Virginia. They had been married since June 1990.

Lawrence had two daughters, a son, and seven grandchildren at the time of his death.

== Death and burial ==
Lawrence died at age 69 in Bern, Switzerland on January 9, 1996. He had suffered from leukemia and dyscrasia, a blood disorder. Richard Holbrooke, assistant secretary of state, wrote a letter praising Lawrence and requesting burial for him at Arlington National Cemetery. This was granted by Army Secretary Togo D. West, Jr. and the waiver request was approved by the Arlington superintendent John C. Metzler Jr.

Questions were raised in 1997 about the life of Lawrence, and President Clinton ordered an investigation into whether Lawrence had lied about his military service in World War II. Congressional investigators searched military records and could not corroborate Lawrence's claims of wartime service in the Merchant Marine with the alleged rank of Seaman First Class, or presence during the torpedoing of the ship SS Horace Bushnell. It was later learned that he was in fact enrolled in college during the time periods that he claimed to have served in the Merchant Marine. On December 12, 1997, at the request of Lawrence's widow, his body was disinterred and taken to California. He was then buried in El Camino Memorial Park, Sorrento Valley, San Diego. Metzler and West stated that Lawrence would have qualified for a waiver for burial at Arlington because he had served as an ambassador.

Diplomatic posts
Preceded by Joseph Bernard Gildenhorn	United States Ambassador to Switzerland; 1994–1996	Succeeded by Madeleine M. Kunin
