= Scattered Canary =

Nigerian fraud ring

Scattered Canary is a Nigerian fraud ring. During the COVID-19 lockdowns in 2020, the group used business email compromise and, according to the United States Secret Service, "hundreds if not thousands" of money mules to defraud U.S. state unemployment agencies. A security firm that tracked the group said they started in 2009 committing Craigslist scams, then in 2015 began phishing, and in 2016 were committing tax return fraud and credit card fraud, before specializing in ripoffs of government agencies in 2017. The Washington State Employment Security Department said that the group had stolen hundreds of millions of dollars from it in 2020; an estimate of the loss by the Washington State Auditor runs as high as over $600 million. In 2021, investigative journalists reported having accessed a 13-page "how to" guide published by Scattered Canary on defrauding the Texas unemployment system, which paid out over $800 million in fraudulent claims.
