= Edward Y. Parsons =

American politician (1842–1876)

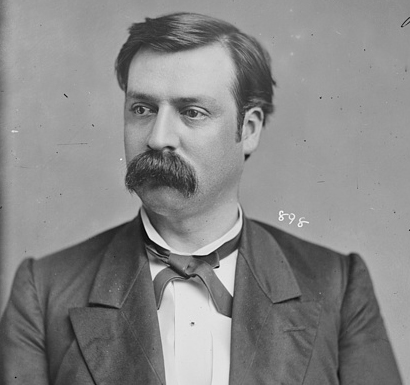

Member of the U.S. House of Representatives from Kentucky's 5th district
- In office March 4, 1875 – July 8, 1876
- Preceded by: Elisha D. Standiford
- Succeeded by: Henry Watterson

Personal details
- Born: December 12, 1842 Middletown, Kentucky, U.S.
- Died: July 8, 1876 (aged 33) Washington, D.C., U.S.
- Resting place: Cave Hill Cemetery; Louisville, Kentucky, U.S.
- Party: Democratic
- Spouse: Mary Belknap
- Education: University of Louisville School of Law
- Profession: Lawyer

Edward Young Parsons (December 12, 1842 – July 8, 1876) was a U.S. representative from Kentucky.

Born in Middletown, Kentucky, Parsons attended the public schools at Louisville, Kentucky until age 12. He studied one year in the St. Louis High School. He returned to Louisville and graduated from the municipal university in 1861, where he taught school for three years. He graduated from the Louisville Law School in 1865 and practiced law in Louisville.

Parsons was elected as a Democrat to the 44th United States Congress and served from March 4, 1875, until his death in Washington, D.C., July 8, 1876. He was interred in Cave Hill Cemetery, Louisville.

== See also ==
- List of members of the United States Congress who died in office (1790–1899)

U.S. House of Representatives
Preceded by Elisha D. Standiford	U.S. Congressman, Kentucky's 5th district 1875–1876	Succeeded by Henry Watterson
