= Don Beyer =

American politician and diplomat (born 1950)

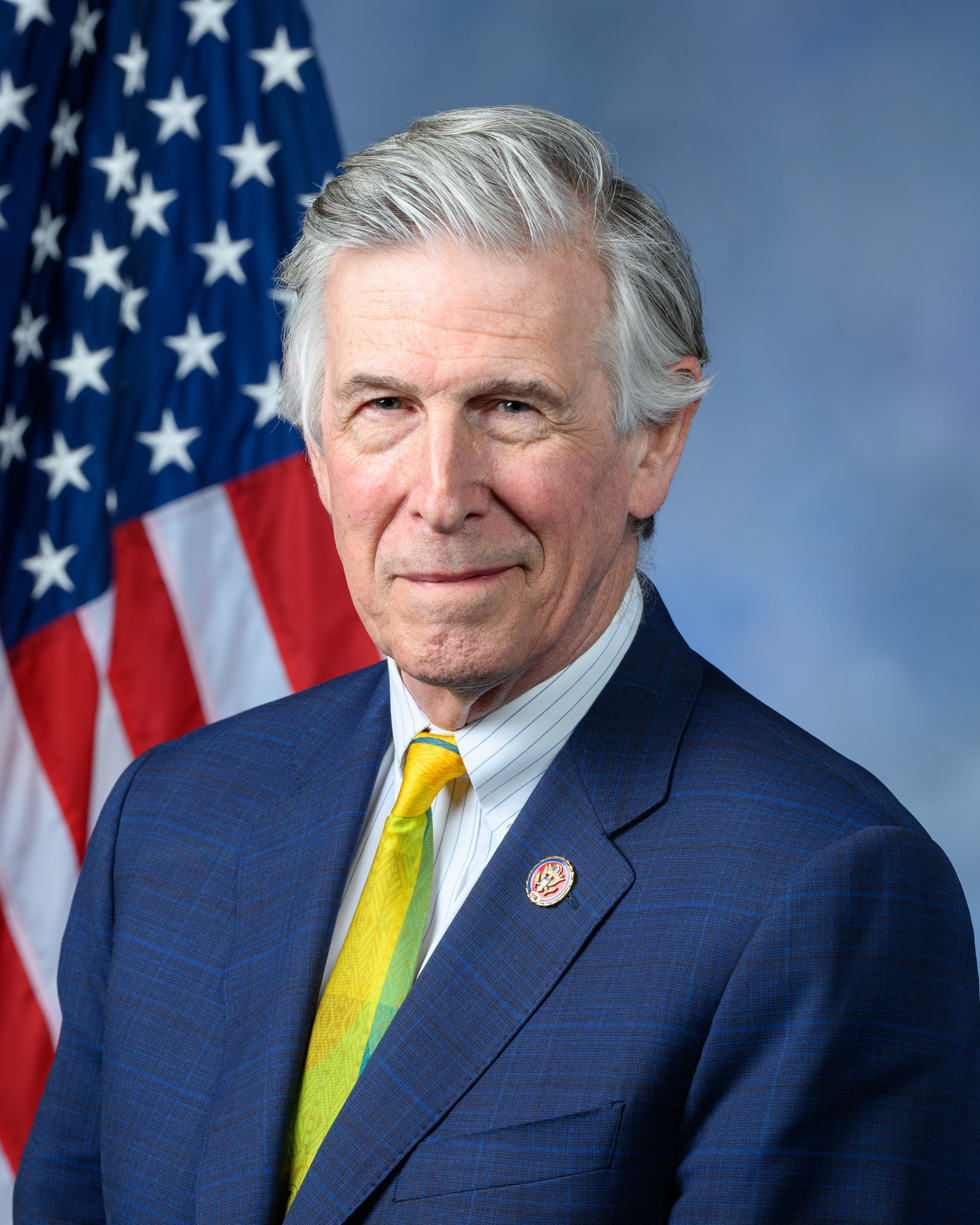
- Official portrait, 2023

Chair of the Joint Economic Committee
- In office January 3, 2021 – January 3, 2023
- Preceded by: Mike Lee
- Succeeded by: Martin Heinrich

Vice Chair of the Joint Economic Committee
- In office January 16, 2020 – February 3, 2021
- Preceded by: Carolyn Maloney
- Succeeded by: Martin Heinrich

Member of the U.S. House of Representatives from Virginia's 8th district
- Incumbent
- Assumed office January 3, 2015
- Preceded by: Jim Moran

United States Ambassador to Switzerland and Liechtenstein
- In office September 8, 2009 – May 29, 2013
- President: Barack Obama
- Preceded by: Peter Coneway
- Succeeded by: Suzan G. LeVine

36th Lieutenant Governor of Virginia
- In office January 13, 1990 – January 17, 1998
- Governor: Douglas Wilder; George Allen
- Preceded by: Douglas Wilder
- Succeeded by: John Hager

Personal details
- Born: Donald Sternoff Beyer Jr. June 20, 1950 (age 76) Trieste, Free Territory of Trieste (now Italy)
- Party: Democratic
- Spouses: Carolyn McInerney (m. 1972; div. 1986); Megan Carroll (m. 1987)
- Children: 4
- Education: Williams College (BA); George Mason University (attended)
- Website: House website Campaign website
- Beyer's voice Beyer supporting the Inflation Reduction Act; Recorded August 12, 2022

Donald Sternoff Beyer Jr. (/ˈbaɪ.ər/ BY-ər; born June 20, 1950) is an American politician, businessman, and diplomat serving as the U.S. representative for Virginia's 8th congressional district since 2015. A member of the Democratic Party, Beyer served as United States ambassador to Switzerland and Liechtenstein from 2009 to 2013.

Beyer has owned automobile dealerships in Virginia and has a long record of community and philanthropic involvement. From 1990 to 1998, he served two terms as the thirty-sixth lieutenant governor of Virginia during the gubernatorial administrations of Doug Wilder (1990–1994) and George Allen (1994–1998). His party's nominee for governor of Virginia in 1997, he lost to Republican Jim Gilmore, who was then the attorney general of Virginia.

In 2014, Beyer announced his candidacy for the U.S. House of Representatives seat for Virginia's 8th congressional district, held by the retiring Jim Moran. Beyer won the seven-candidate Democratic primary in June with 46% of the vote and went on to win the general election by thirty points. He has since been reelected five times, most recently in 2024. His district is located in Northern Virginia and includes Alexandria, Falls Church, Arlington, and parts of eastern Fairfax County.

== Early life and education ==
Beyer was born in the Free Territory of Trieste, the son of a U.S. Army officer, Donald Sternoff Beyer Sr., and his wife, Nancy McDonald. His grandmother Clara Mortenson Beyer was a pioneer in labor economics and workers' rights, and worked in the United States Department of Labor under Frances Perkins during the New Deal era. His grandfather Otto S. Beyer Jr. was Chairman of the National Mediation Board. The oldest of six children, he was raised in Washington, D.C., where his grandparents lived.

In 1968, he graduated from Gonzaga College High School, where he was salutatorian of his class; in 1972 he graduated Phi Beta Kappa from Williams College, magna cum laude, in economics. Beyer was a Presidential Scholar in 1968 and a National Merit Scholarship winner. He graduated from a winter Outward Bound course at Dartmouth College in January 1971 and attended Wellesley College that year as part of the "12 College Exchange" program.

In 2022, during his congressional career, Beyer enrolled at George Mason University in pursuit of a master's degree in computer science with a concentration in machine learning, taking one evening course per semester. He told The Washington Post in December 2022 that he was taking required undergraduate courses before he started graduate coursework, which he expected to begin by 2024.

== Business career ==
After college, Beyer worked at the Volvo dealership his father purchased in 1973. In 1986, he and his brother Michael bought the business from their parents and as the Beyer Automotive Group, the business expanded to nine dealerships, including the Volvo, Land Rover, Kia, Volkswagen, Mazda, and Subaru brands. Beyer sold his share of the dealerships to his brother in 2019. Beyer is a former chairman of the National Volvo Retailer Advisory Board. In 2006, he chaired the American International Automobile Dealers Association.

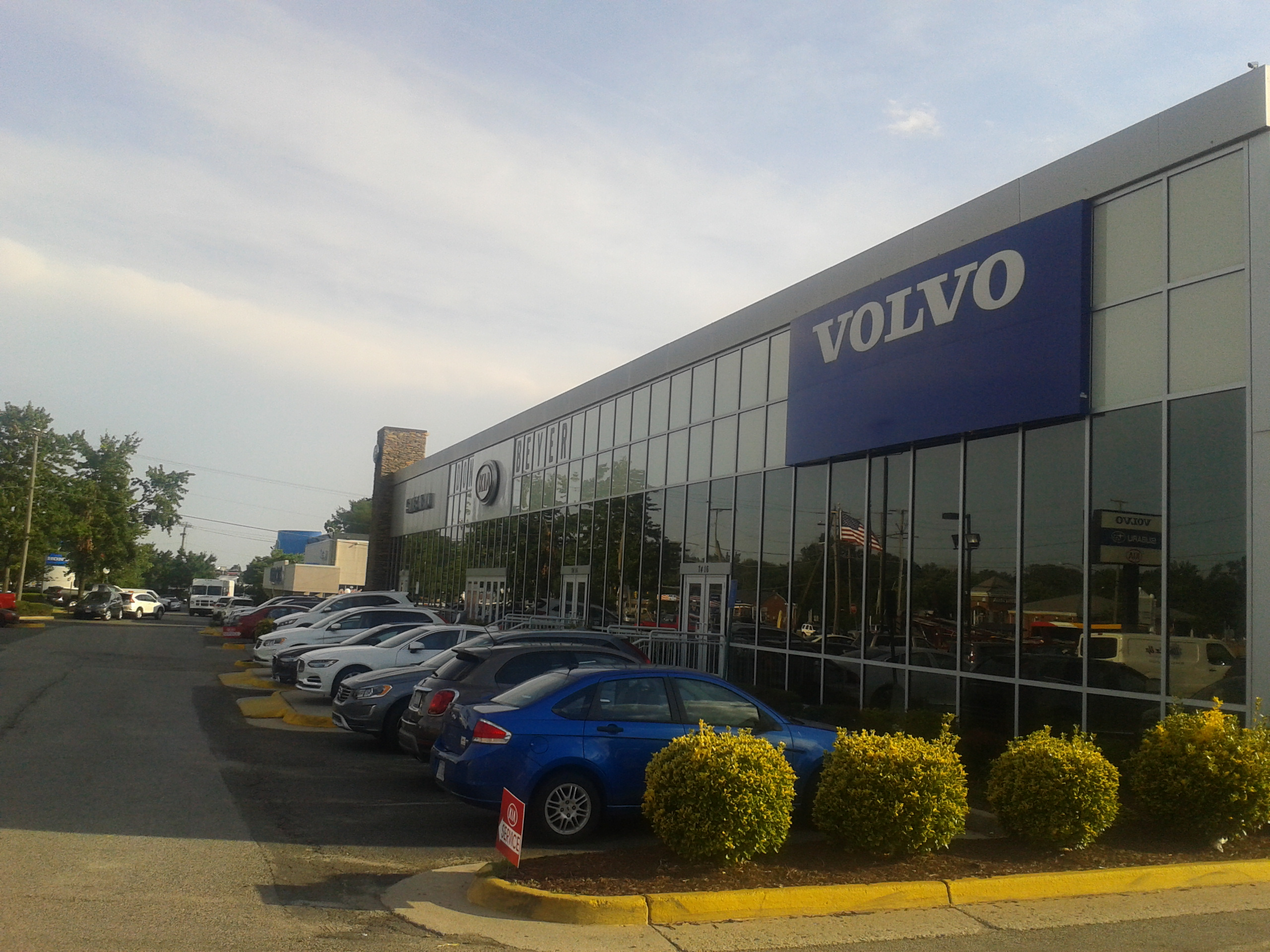
One of Beyer's automotive dealerships in Fairfax County, Virginia

Beyer served on the board of Demosphere International, Inc., a leading soccer registration software provider. He was also a board member of History Associates, which bills itself as "The Best Company in History." He has served on the Virginia Board of First Union National Bank, the board of Shenandoah Life Insurance Company, and the board of Lightly Expressed, a fiber optic lighting design and manufacturing firm.

== Civic activism ==
During nearly two decades of community activism, Beyer has taken leadership roles on the boards of many business, philanthropic and public policy organizations, including the Fairfax County Chamber of Commerce and the American Cancer Society. He has received numerous awards and honors, including the Grand Award for Highway Safety from the National Safety Federation; the James C. Wheat Jr. Award for Service to Virginians with Disabilities; the Earl Williams Leadership in Technology Award; and the Thomas Jefferson Award for 2012 from American Citizens Abroad.

In 2017, he received the Leaders for Democracy Award from the Project on Middle East Democracy. In April 2017, he received the Community Integration Leadership Award for Community and Public Service from the ENDependence Center of Northern Virginia and the Community Engagement Award from Phillips Programs for Children and Families. In 2021, Beyer received the Excellence in Public Service Award from the Population Association of America.

Beyer chaired the board of the Alexandria Community Trust, Alexandria's community foundation, and the board of Jobs for Virginia Graduates, the state's largest high school dropout prevention program. He is a former president of the board of Youth for Tomorrow, Washington Redskins coach Joe Gibbs's residential home for troubled adolescent boys and girls. He also served on the board of the DC Campaign to Prevent Teen Pregnancy. He currently serves on the board of directors of Jobs for America's Graduates.

In 2022, readers and editors of Arlington Magazine named Beyer "Best Elected Official" as part of the magazine's annual roundup of favorite restaurants, shops, doctors, summer camps, live bands and more in Arlington County, Virginia.

== Political career ==
Beyer served as the northern Virginia coordinator for the Gerald L. Baliles campaign for governor in 1985. In 1986, Governor Baliles appointed Beyer to the Commonwealth Transportation Board (CTB), which oversees the Virginia Department of Transportation and allocates highway funding to specific projects. It consists of seventeen members, including the Secretary of Transportation, Commonwealth Transportation Commissioner, Director of the Department of Rail and Public Transportation, and fourteen citizen members who are appointed by the governor and confirmed by the Virginia General Assembly.

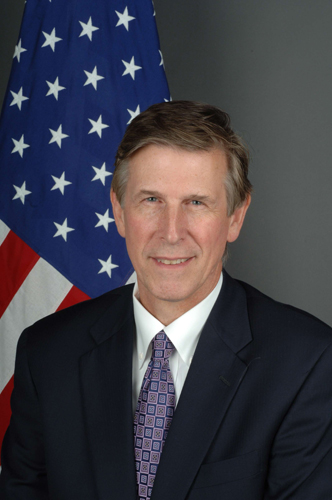
Beyer as ambassador to Switzerland and Liechtenstein

Beyer was elected lieutenant governor of Virginia in 1989, defeating Republican state senator Edwina P. Dalton. He was reelected in the 1993, defeating Republican Michael Farris, 54% to 46%, as Republicans George Allen and Jim Gilmore were elected on the same ballot as governor and attorney general, respectively.

Farris's close connection to conservative leaders such as Jerry Falwell of the Moral Majority, Pat Robertson of the Christian Coalition and Phyllis Schlafly of the Eagle Forum, as well as his adherence to the Quiverfull movement, were controversial and led some prominent Virginia Republicans such as Senator John Warner to support Beyer rather than Farris.

During his tenure as lieutenant governor, Beyer served as president of the Virginia Senate. He chaired the Virginia Economic Recovery Commission, the Virginia Commission on Sexual Assault, the Virginia Commission on Disabilities and the Poverty Commission and co-founded the Northern Virginia Technology Council, an outgrowth of the Chamber of Commerce. He was active in promoting high-tech industries and led the fight to eliminate disincentives in the Virginia Tax Code to high-tech research and development.

He is also credited with writing Virginia's original welfare reform legislation.

Beyer was the Democratic nominee for governor in 1997 and lost to Republican Jim Gilmore. He served as Finance Chairman for Mark Warner's Political Action Committee, "Forward Together", and as the National Treasurer for the 2004 presidential campaign of former Vermont Governor Howard Dean. After Dean withdrew from the race, he served as chairman of the John Kerry campaign in Virginia.

In 2007–08, Beyer endorsed and campaigned extensively for presidential candidate Barack Obama. He chaired the Mid Atlantic Finance Council of Obama for America campaign and served on the campaign's National Finance Council.

The Democratic National Committee appointed Beyer to serve at the 2008 DNC Convention on the Credentials Committee.

Following the 2008 election, President-elect Obama asked Beyer to head up the transition team at the Department of Commerce.

Obama nominated Beyer for United States ambassador to Switzerland and Liechtenstein on June 12, 2009. In December 2010, Beyer attracted public attention when it was reported that he had warned the Swiss government against offering asylum to WikiLeaks publisher Julian Assange. In March 2013, Beyer received the Thomas Jefferson Award from American Citizens Abroad. ACA presents the award annually to recognize State Department members who have rendered outstanding service to Americans overseas. Beyer was recognized for organizing a series of town hall meetings where American citizens overseas could voice concerns and opinions to State Department officials. He resigned as ambassador in May 2013.

During the run-up to the 2020 primaries, Beyer endorsed Pete Buttigieg for president. He then endorsed Joe Biden on Super Tuesday.

== U.S. House of Representatives ==
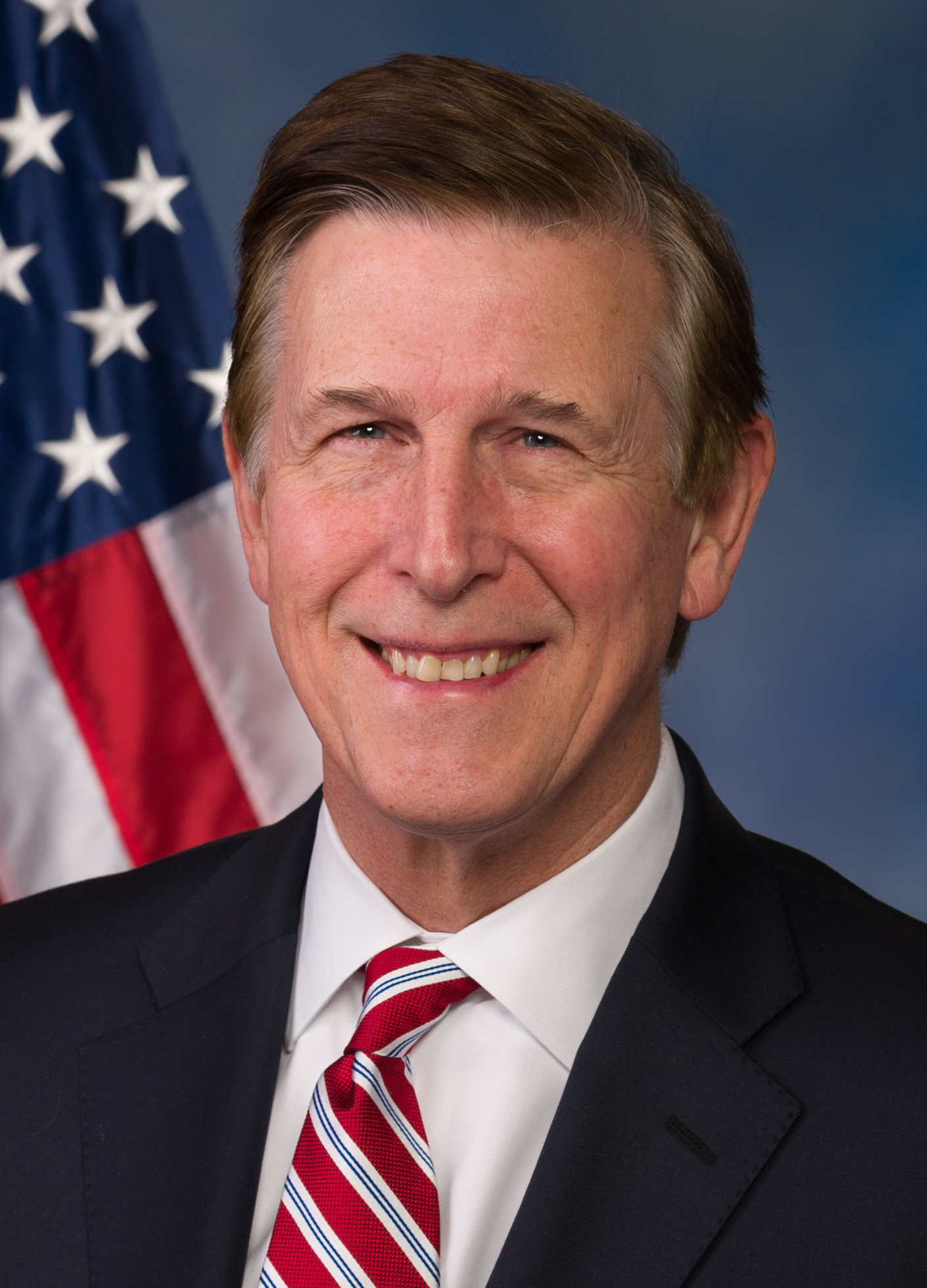
Beyer during the 114th Congress

=== Elections ===
==== 2014 ====
On January 24, 2014, Beyer announced his candidacy for Virginia's 8th congressional district to succeed retiring Democratic incumbent Jim Moran. It was his first partisan race since losing the 1997 gubernatorial election. He won the June 10 Democratic primary with 45.7% of the vote.

On November 4, Beyer defeated Republican nominee Micah Edmond and three others in the general election, receiving 63.1% of the vote. But he had effectively clinched a seat in Congress in the primary. At the time, the 8th was Virginia's second-most Democratic district, with a Cook Partisan Voting Index of D+16 (only the 3rd district was more Democratic).

Beyer is a member of the Congressional Progressive Caucus.

==== 2016 ====
Beyer defeated Republican nominee Charles Hernick, 68.6% to 27.4%.

==== 2018 ====
Beyer defeated Republican nominee Thomas Oh, 76.3% to 23.7%.

==== 2020 ====
Beyer defeated Republican nominee Jeff Jordan, 75.8% to 24.0%.

==== 2022 ====
Beyer defeated Republican nominee Karina Lipsman, 73.5% to 24.8%.

==== 2024 ====
Beyer defeated Republican nominee Jerry Torres, 71.5% to 24.7%.

==== 2026 ====
Beyer defeated four opponents to win renomination in the August 2026 Democratic primary.

=== Tenure ===
Beyer frequently criticized the first Trump administration. He was the first lawmaker to call for senior White House adviser and Trump's son-in-law Jared Kushner to lose his security clearance after it was revealed that Kushner had omitted numerous contacts with foreign nationals from his security clearance application. In June 2020, Beyer renewed his call, sending a letter signed by more than fifty other House Democrats demanding that the White House immediately revoke Kushner's clearance, citing national security concerns.

In June 2017, Beyer introduced the Fair Representation Act. The bill did not advance out of committee during the 115th Congress. He introduced another version in July 2025 that would require ranked-choice voting in congressional elections, establish multi-member House districts in states with more than one representative, and require nonpartisan criteria for congressional redistricting.

In December 2020, Beyer proposed the Cost of Police Misconduct Act, which would require the Department of Justice to establish a publicly accessible database of police misconduct allegations, court judgments, and settlements. The database would include settlement amounts, demographic information about the officers and civilians involved, and any disciplinary action taken against officers.

Beyer voted for a House resolution expressing support for Israel following the October 7 attacks. He declined to vote in favor of a resolution declaring anti-Zionism a form of antisemitism, and instead voted present.

In June 2022, after a spate of mass shootings in the U.S., Beyer said he would propose a bill to increase taxes on assault-style guns by 1,000%. He told Business Insider, "What it's intended to do is provide another creative pathway to actually make some sensible gun control happen. We think that a 1,000% fee on assault weapons is just the kind of restrictive measure that creates enough fiscal impact to qualify for reconciliation."

In October 2023, Beyer introduced legislation to prohibit the trade of donkey-hide gelatin, or ejiao, due to animal welfare concerns. Across multiple Congresses, Beyer has authored the Humane Cosmetics Act, which would prohibit testing cosmetics on animals and bar the sale of new animal-tested cosmetic products in the United States. In March 2025, Beyer stated: "Cosmetics testing on animals is cruel, unnecessary, and outdated, and Congress should finally put a stop to it".

In February 2024, Beyer joined Representative Anna Eshoo and senators Ed Markey and Martin Heinrich in introducing the Artificial Intelligence Environmental Impacts Act. The legislation would direct federal agencies to study the environmental effects of artificial intelligence and develop a voluntary system for reporting those effects, including energy consumption, pollution, and electronic waste. The House bill did not advance out of committee before the end of the 118th Congress.

Beyer worked with several peers in introducing the Wildlife Corridors and Habitat Connectivity Conservation Act (most recently re-introduced in the 119th Congress on April 22, 2026), which would establish an American Wildlife Corridors System. This national system would allow for species to move freely and safely amongst habitats to support wildlife migration, genetic exchange, and adaptation to climate change. While gaining much support, a Sierra Club article predicted slim chances of passage or advancement given the makeup of the 119th Congress.

=== Committee assignments ===
- Committee on Ways and Means
  - Subcommittee on Trade
  - Subcommittee on Tax
- Joint Economic Committee (Senior House Democrat)

=== Caucus memberships ===
- Black Maternal Health Caucus
- New Democrat Coalition
- Congressional Arts Caucus
- Climate Solutions Caucus
- Caucus on Macedonia and Macedonian-Americans
- U.S.-Japan Caucus
- Congressional Equality Caucus
- Medicare for All Caucus
- Congressional Progressive Caucus
- Congressional Freethought Caucus
- Americans Abroad Caucus
- Congressional Blockchain Caucus
- Congressional Caucus for the Equal Rights Amendment
- Congressional Caucus on Turkey and Turkish Americans
- Rare Disease Caucus

== Personal life ==
Beyer and his wife, Megan, have two children, Clara and Grace. He also has two children, Don and Stephanie, from a previous marriage, and two grandchildren. He is an Episcopalian.

Political offices
Preceded by Douglas Wilder	Lieutenant Governor of Virginia; 1990–1998	Succeeded by John Hager
Party political offices
Preceded by Mary Sue Terry	Democratic nominee for Governor of Virginia; 1997	Succeeded by Mark Warner
Diplomatic posts
Preceded by Peter Coneway	United States Ambassador to Switzerland and Liechtenstein; 2009–2013	Succeeded by Jeffrey Cellars; Acting
U.S. House of Representatives
Preceded by Jim Moran	Member of the U.S. House of Representatives from Virginia's 8th congressional district 2015–present	Incumbent
Preceded by Mike Lee	Chair of the Joint Economic Committee; 2021–2023	Succeeded by Martin Heinrich
U.S. order of precedence (ceremonial)
Preceded by Brian Babin	United States representatives by seniority 128th	Succeeded by Mike Bost
