= Mercer Reynolds =

American businessman and diplomat

United States Ambassador to Switzerland and Liechtenstein
- In office September 11, 2001 – March 29, 2003
- President: George W. Bush
- Preceded by: J. Richard Fredericks
- Succeeded by: Pamela Willeford

Personal details
- Born: June 17, 1945 (age 81) Chattanooga, Tennessee, U.S.
- Education: University of North Carolina at Chapel Hill (BBA); University of Tennessee at Chattanooga (MBA)

Mercer "Merce" Reynolds III (born June 17, 1945) is an American businessman. He was the finance chair of U.S. President George W. Bush's presidential campaign.

== Education and early career ==
Reynolds, born in Chattanooga, Tennessee, earned a bachelor's degree in business administration from the University of North Carolina at Chapel Hill, and an M.B.A. from the University of Tennessee at Chattanooga. After serving briefly in the United States Army (1968–1969), he worked for Coca-Cola for ten years.

== Career ==
In 1979, Reynolds and business partner William DeWitt founded the investment firm Reynolds, DeWitt & Co.; he was its co-chair until 2001. Reynolds' other business ventures included Spectrum 7, an oil company which he co-chaired from 1980 to 1985 and which, in 1984 merged with the struggling firm Arbusto Energy, which was owned by George W. Bush. Reynolds was later an investor with Bush in the Texas Rangers baseball team. From 1985 to 2001, he was CEO of Reynolds Plantation, a golf community near Lake Oconee in Georgia.

Reynolds was the Ohio finance chairman for the George W. Bush 2000 presidential campaign, raising over $600,000, and was named to co-chair Bush's inaugural committee. As the national finance chair of U.S. President George W. Bush's 2004 re-election campaign, Reynolds helped raise over $200 million for the successful effort and is sometimes credited with helping to deliver Ohio's key electoral votes to the President. He was a frequent guest of President Bush at the White House and at Camp David and was a leading contender for the post of Commerce Secretary upon the 2004 resignation of Donald Evans. Carlos Gutierrez was ultimately selected, and served until the end of Bush's term.

Reynolds has been active in fundraising for community and civic organizations including Summerbridge, a tutoring program for inner-city youth in Cincinnati, the National Coalition for the Protection of Children and Families, and United Way of America. In the field of foreign policy, he sits on the advisory board of the Center for Strategic and International Studies and has been involved with the Bridging the Rift Foundation in the Middle East.

=== Ambassadorship ===
From August 2001 to September 2003, Reynolds served as the ambassador of the United States to Switzerland and Liechtenstein, although was criticized for his lack of qualifications or prior diplomatic experience.

== Personal life ==
Reynolds lives in Indian Hill, Ohio; he has five children. His deceased wife, Gabrielle Reynolds (1948-2018) was appointed by President Bush in 2004 to serve on the board of trustees of the Kennedy Center for the Performing Arts. Reynolds' daughter-in-law is Lindsay Reynolds, the former Chief of Staff of First Lady of the United States Melania Trump.

Mercer was a platform tennis player for many years in the '70s and '80s and was nationally ranked.

Diplomatic posts
Preceded by J. Richard Fredericks	United States Ambassador to Switzerland and Liechtenstein; 2001–2003	Succeeded by Pamela Willeford
