= 5th Kentucky Infantry Regiment (Union) =

- Active: September 9, 1861 - July 25, 1865
- Country: United States
- Allegiance: Union
- Branch: Infantry
- Engagements: Battle of Shiloh; Siege of Corinth; Battle of Perryville; Battle of Stones River; Tullahoma Campaign; Battle of Chickamauga; Chattanooga campaign Battle of Missionary Ridge; Atlanta campaign Battle of Resaca; Battle of Kennesaw Mountain; Battle of Peachtree Creek; Siege of Atlanta; Battle of Nashville

The 5th Kentucky Infantry Regiment, unofficially known as the Louisville Legion was an infantry regiment that served in the Union Army during the American Civil War.

== Service ==
The 5th Kentucky Infantry Regiment was mustered into the service at Louisville, Kentucky, under the command of Colonel Lovell Harrison Rousseau.

Recruits to the 5th Kentucky Infantry were promised a pay of $11–$21 a month, in addition to clothes and lodging. After a year's enlistment, they were promised 160 acres (0.65 km^{2}) of land. Although a recruitment station was placed at the corner of 8th Street and Main Street in Louisville, the actual training took place across the Ohio River at Camp Joe Holt, in present-day Clarksville, Indiana.

On July 1, 1861, 334 recruits were shipped to Camp Joe Holt as the first company. On September 17, 1861, the regiment left Camp Joe Holt, to stop Confederate forces from approaching Louisville.

The regiment was attached to Rousseau's 1st Brigade, McCook's Command, at Nolin to November 1861. 4th Brigade, Army of the Ohio, to December 1861. 4th Brigade, 2nd Division, Army of the Ohio, to September 1862. 4th Brigade, 2nd Division, I Corps, Army of the Ohio, to November 1862. 3rd Brigade, 2nd Division, Right Wing, XIV Corps, Army of the Cumberland, to January 1863. 3rd Brigade, 2nd Division, XX Corps, Army of the Cumberland, to October 1863. 2nd Brigade, 3rd Division, IV Corps, to July 1864. Unattached, 4th Division, XX Corps, to September 1864.

The 5th Kentucky Infantry mustered out of service on July 25, 1865.

== Detailed service ==
Moved to Muldraugh's Hill, Kentucky, September 17, 1861, and duty there until October 14. Duty at Bacon Creek and Green River until February 1862. Marched to Nashville, Tennessee, February 17-March 3; then marched to Savannah, Tennessee, March 16-April 6. Battle of Shiloh, April 6–7. Advance on and siege of Corinth, Mississippi, April 29-May 30. Bridge Creek May 27. Duty at Corinth until June 10. Buell's Campaign in northern Alabama and middle Tennessee June to August. Marched to Louisville, Kentucky, in pursuit of Bragg August 21-September 26. Pursuit of Bragg into Kentucky October 1–15. Dog Walk, Kentucky, October 8–9. Marched to Nashville, Tennessee, October 16-November 7, and duty there until December 26. Kimbrough's Mills December 6. Advance on Murfreesboro, Tennessee, December 26–30. Nolensville December 26–27. Battle of Stones River December 30–31, 1862 and January 1–3, 1863. At Murfreesboro until June. Tullahoma Campaign June 22-July 7. Liberty Gap June 22–27. Occupation of middle Tennessee until August 16. Passage of Cumberland Mountains and Tennessee River and Chickamauga Campaign August 16-September 22. Battle of Chickamauga, September 19–20. Siege of Chattanooga September 24-November 23. Reopening Tennessee River October 26–29. Brown's Ferry October 27. Battles of Chattanooga November 23–25. Orchard Knob November 23–24. Missionary Ridge November 25. Pursuit to Graysville November 26–27. Marched to relief of Knoxville November 28-December 8. Campaign in eastern Tennessee December 1863 to April 1864. Atlanta Campaign May 1 to July 25. Demonstration on Rocky Faced Ridge and Dalton May 5–13. Battle of Resaca May 14–15. Adairsville May 17. Near Kingston May 18–19. Near Cassville May 19. Advance on Dallas May 22–25. Operations on line of Pumpkin Vine Creek and battles about Dallas, New Hope Church, and Allatoona Hills May 25-June 5. Pickett's Mills May 27. Operations about Marietta and against Kennesaw Mountain June 10-July 2. Pine Hill June 11–14. Lost Mountain June 15–17. Assault on Kennesaw June 27. Ruff's Station, Smyrna Camp Ground, July 4. Pace's Ferry July 5. Chattahoochie River July 6–17. Peachtree Creek July 19–20. Siege of Atlanta July 22–25. Ordered to Nashville, Tennessee, July 25; then to Louisville, Kentucky. Veterans moved to Nashville July 25 and duty there until January 1865. Battle of Nashville, Tennessee, December 15–16. Pursuit of Hood December 17–28. Moved to Louisville, Pittsburgh, Philadelphia, New York, and Hilton Head, South Carolina, and rejoined Sherman at Raleigh, North Carolina, April 1865. Bennett's House April 26. Surrender of Johnston and his army. Marched to Washington, D.C., via Richmond, Virginia, April 29-May 19. Grand Review of the Armies May 24. Moved to Louisville, Kentucky, June.

== Casualties ==
The regiment lost a total of 302 men during service; 8 officers and 149 enlisted men killed or mortally wounded, 2 officers and 143 enlisted men died of disease.

== Commanders ==
- Colonel Lovell Harrison Rousseau
- Colonel Harvey M. Buckley - resigned January 26, 1863
- Colonel William W. Berry

== Legacy ==
The Louisville Legion nickname was derived from an earlier Kentucky militia unit that was first constituted on January 21, 1839, in Louisville, and was mustered into federal service for the Mexican–American War, from May 17, 1846, as the 1st Kentucky Volunteer Infantry Regiment. It saw action in the Battle of Monterey. On May 17, 1847, in New Orleans, it was mustered out.

Of the regiment's service during the Civil War, Gen. William Tecumseh Sherman wrote, "No single body of men can claim more honor for the grand result than the officers and men of the Louisville Legion of 1861."

Ten years after the Civil War the Louisville Legion would again organize as the Kentucky State Guard's 1st Regiment of Infantry. In this incarnation it would take part in the French Eversole Feud and the Rowan County War. In the Spanish–American War it would be the first unit from Kentucky to reach Puerto Rico. Afterwards it would maintain the peace around Frankfort, Kentucky, after the assassination of Governor William Goebel, and then patrol the Mexican border.

The 138th Field Artillery and 149th Armor Brigade of the Kentucky National Guard are directly descended from the Louisville Legion.

== See also ==
- List of Kentucky Civil War Units
- Louisville Home Guard
- Kentucky in the American Civil War
- Louisville in the American Civil War
