= Henry Watterson =

American journalist and politician (1840–1921)

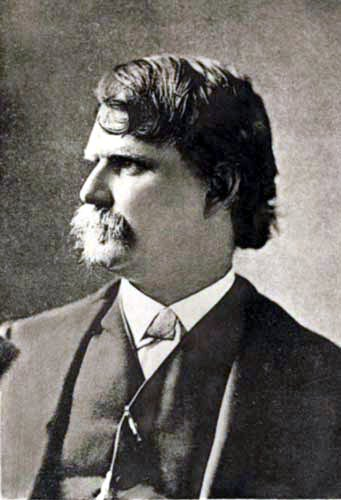

Member of the U.S. House of Representatives from Kentucky's 5th district
- In office August 12, 1876 – March 3, 1877
- Preceded by: Edward Y. Parsons
- Succeeded by: Albert S. Willis

Personal details
- Born: February 16, 1840 Washington, D.C., U.S.
- Died: December 22, 1921 (aged 81) Jacksonville, Florida, U.S.
- Resting place: Cave Hill Cemetery; Louisville, Kentucky, U.S.
- Party: Democratic
- Spouse: Rebecca Ewing (m. 1865)
- Children: 8
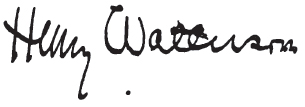
- Signature

Henry Watterson (February 16, 1840 – December 22, 1921) was a prominent journalist in Louisville, Kentucky, as well as a Confederate soldier, author and partial term U.S. congressman. A Democrat, like his father, Harvey Magee Watterson, Henry Watterson for five decades after the American Civil War was a part-owner and editor of the Louisville Courier-Journal, which was founded by Walter Newman Haldeman and was purchased by Robert Worth Bingham in 1919. Bingham ended the Pulitzer Prize-winning Watterson's association with the paper.

== Early and family life ==
Born in Washington, D.C., on February 16, 1840, to the former Tilithacumi (Talitha) Black of Spring Hill, Tennessee, and her husband, Harvey Magee Watterson, a lawyer and U.S. congressman from Shelbyville, Tennessee. His father was close to President Andrew Jackson, a fellow Tennessean, and in 1843 became the publisher of the Washington Union, the main newspaper of the Democratic party of that era. His uncle in Ohio, Stanley Matthews, became a newspaper editor, lawyer, Union soldier during the Civil War and ultimately Republican U.S. Supreme Court justice.

Henry was an only child. He was sickly, with very poor eyesight and that only in one eye, so that his mother home-schooled him in Washington, D.C., and their home in Nashville, Tennessee, until he was twelve years old. She then sent him to Philadelphia, Pennsylvania, where he received his only formal education, at an academy run by an Episcopal priest, and he also ran the school paper, the New Era, on a press his father donated.

After the American Civil War as discussed below, in September 1865, Watterson returned to Nashville to marry Rebecca Ewing, with whom he would have six sons and two daughters. They were able to hire live-in Irish servants, and by 1880 his parents also lived with them. Their sons were Ewing (born 1868), Henry Jr. (born 1877) and Harvey W. Watterson (1879–1908) and their daughters were Lady (born 1871) and Ethel Watterson Gilmour (1880–1907).

== Career ==
Watterson became a newspaper reporter early in his life. In 1856 he moved to New York to work on various publications, and in 1858 he moved to Washington to work on other publications.

When his father returned to Tennessee in 1861 after the outbreak of the American Civil War, Henry Watterson did too. He volunteered for the Confederate States Army, and was attached at various times to the staffs of Generals Joseph E. Johnston, Leonidas Polk and Nathan B. Forrest. His main contribution to the Confederate war effort, however, was editorial, with the Chattanooga Rebel and the Nashville Banner. After the Confederacy lost, Watterson edited the Cincinnati Evening Post for six months. By September 1865 Watterson returned to Nashville, married, become editor and part owner of the Nashville Banner, where he began his “New Departure” campaign urging national reconciliation.

Watterson ultimately settled down in Louisville, Kentucky, having met Walter Newman Haldeman during the war, and began editing the Louisville Journal. That paper merged with the Louisville Courier in 1868, forming the Courier-Journal. This paper soon gained national attention for its excellent reporting. Watterson was a leader of the Liberal Republican movement in 1872. By 1876 he was a Democrat; his proposal for hundreds of thousands of Democrats to march on Washington to force the election of Tilden angered President Ulysses S. Grant, who noted that nobody threatened Grant. Watterson was elected to fill the rest of Edward Y. Parsons' term in the U.S. House when Parsons died in office.

Watterson was called "the last of the great personal journalists", writing colorful and controversial editorials on many topics under the pen name "Marse Henry". Hundreds of American papers republished them; they were an early exemplar of the syndicated column which played a significant role creating public support for U.S. intervention in the First World War. Watterson won the Pulitzer Prize in 1918 for two editorials supporting U.S. entry into World War I ("Vae Victis!" and "War Has Its Compensations"), and he remained the paper's editor until 1919, retiring after conflicts with Robert Worth Bingham, who purchased the paper in 1918.

During his tenure as editor, Watterson was a Democratic representative in Congress from 1876 to 1877. He was also a five-time delegate to the Democratic National Convention, where, in 1892, Watterson received a smattering of votes for the vice presidential nomination. He became widely known as a lecturer and orator. His publications include History of the Spanish–American War (1899) and The Compromises of Life (1902).

== Death ==
Watterson died in Jacksonville, Duval County, Florida in 1921.

=== Legacy ===
The portion of I-264 from the junction with US 31W to its northeastern terminus at I-71 is known as the Watterson Expressway.

A Jefferson County Public School in eastern Louisville is named Watterson Elementary School.

The World War II liberty ship SS Henry Watterson was named in his honor.

== See also ==
- History of Louisville, Kentucky
- List of people from the Louisville metropolitan area

== Sources ==
- Encyclopedia of Kentucky. New York, New York: Somerset Publishers. 1987. pp. 189–192. ISBN 0-403-09981-1.
- Margolies, Daniel S. (2006). Henry Watterson And the New South: The Politics of Empire, Free Trade, And Globalization. University Press of Kentucky. ISBN 9780813124179.

U.S. House of Representatives
| Preceded by Edward Y. Parsons | U.S. Congressman, Kentucky's 5th district 1876–1877 | Succeeded by Albert S. Willis |
