= Boyd Winchester =

American politician (1836–1923)

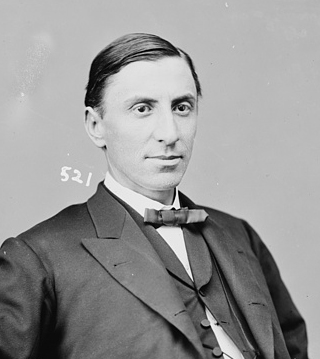

8th United States Ambassador to Switzerland and Liechtenstein
- In office July 9, 1885 – May 24, 1889
- President: Grover Cleveland
- Preceded by: Michael J. Cramer
- Succeeded by: John D. Washburn

Member of the U.S. House of Representatives from Kentucky's 5th district
- In office March 4, 1869 – March 3, 1873
- Preceded by: Asa Grover
- Succeeded by: Elisha Standiford

Member of the Kentucky Senate
- In office 1867-1868

Personal details
- Born: September 23, 1836 Ascension Parish, Louisiana, U.S.
- Died: May 18, 1923 (aged 86) Louisville, Kentucky, U.S.
- Resting place: Cave Hill Cemetery; Louisville, Kentucky, U.S.
- Party: Democratic
- Education: Centre College; University of Virginia; University of Louisville
- Profession: Lawyer

Boyd Winchester (September 23, 1836 – May 18, 1923) was a United States representative from Kentucky. He was born in Ascension Parish, Louisiana. He pursued preparatory studies and then attended Centre College in Danville, Kentucky and the University of Virginia at Charlottesville, Virginia. He graduated from the law department of the University of Louisville, Kentucky, in 1857 and commenced practice in Louisville, Kentucky.

Winchester was a member of the Kentucky Senate in 1867 and 1868 when he resigned. He was elected as a Democrat to the Forty-first and Forty-second Congresses (March 4, 1869 – March 3, 1873) but was not a candidate for renomination in 1872. After leaving Congress, he resumed the practice of law in Louisville, Kentucky and was the president of an insurance company from 1875 to 1877. Winchester was president of the Democratic State Convention in 1884. He was also appointed Minister Resident and consul general to Switzerland and served from 1885 to 1889. Building on the experience and observations made during his tenure, he wrote the book "The Swiss Republic", the publication of which coincided with the 600th anniversary of the foundation of the Swiss Confederation.

Winchester died in Louisville, Kentucky, and was buried in Cave Hill Cemetery.

U.S. House of Representatives
Preceded by Asa Grover	Member of the U.S. House of Representatives from Kentucky's 5th congressional district March 4, 1869 – March 3, 1873	Succeeded by Elisha Standiford
