= Senator Grover (disambiguation) =

La Fayette Grover (1823–1911) was a U.S. Senator from Oregon from 1877 to 1883. Senator Grover may also refer to:

- Asa Grover (1819–1887), Kentucky State Senate
- Henry Grover (1927–2005), Texas State Senate
- Keith Grover (fl. 2000s–present), Utah State Senate

== See also ==
- Senator Grove (disambiguation)
