= John S. Hayes =

American diplomat

John Susskind Hayes, born Harold Spritz Susskind, (August 21, 1910 – October 14, 1981 Jacksonville, Florida) was an executive with The Washington Post Company, worked for three American Presidents, and was the American Ambassador to Switzerland from 1966 to 1969.

== Education ==
Hayes (then Susskind) graduated from Germantown High School in 1927 and from the University of Pennsylvania in 1931 with a degree in History. While at Penn, he competed in fencing as a sophomore and junior and debating as a junior and senior; in his senior year, he was managing editor of The Record, the U Penn Yearbook and a member of the Quill Club.

== Family ==
Spouses:

Evelyn Herrman: married on June 15, 1936; divorced 1955.

Donna Gough: married on August 3, 1957.

Children:

Son - Jonathan (born 1939)

Step-daughter - Rhea

Step-daughter - Laurie

Son - Peter (1958)

Grand children:

Christopher (1969); Laurie (1972); Victoria (1974); Peter (1977); Marshal (1994); Macy (1995)

== Pre-War career ==
Immediately after college, after changing his name due to fear of anti-Semitism, Hayes went to work at WIP radio in Philadelphia as an announcer, making twenty-two dollars per week; within a year he moved into a managerial position.

Several years later, in the late 1930’s, Hayes moved to New York to become Program Manager of WOR radio. At this time, WOR was one of the most important and influential stations in the country for it was one of the stations cooperating to form a new network (the Mutual Broadcasting System).

== World War II ==
In 1940, Hayes, convinced that the United States was heading for war, joined the army as a member of the Quartermaster Corp. He was sent to England as a captain in early 1942. In early 1943, Lieutenant General Jacob Devers, Eisenhower's chief of staff, asked him to start a GI radio station to help the morale of the homesick troops.

As Historian Trent Christman states, "Eleven stars - Army Chief of Staff Gen. George C. Marshall, Supreme Allied Commander Gen. Dwight D. Eisenhower and Lieutenant General Jacob Devers - pushing for completion by the target date of 4 July 1943 was powerful motivation for a young captain."

First, Hayes "got the BBC to waive monopolistic rights to broadcasting in the United Kingdom." Then After the BBC offered to supply a studio where the broadcasts could take place, Hayes, with a group of Army clerks spent three weeks going through personnel records before they found twelve experienced radio people.

At 5:45 PM on 4 July 1943, the Armed Forces program Network (AFN) broadcast for the first time. By AFN's first anniversary, it had more than fifty transmitters installed throughout the British Isles, which broadcast nineteen hours a day. By its second year, AFN had a staff of over seven hundred people and sixty-three stations "scattered from Biarritz to Czechoslovakia; from London to Marseilles."

Hayes became a member of General Eisenhower staff, was promoted to lieutenant colonel and was awarded several medals including the American Bronze Star, the Order of the British Empire and the French Croix de Guerre.

== Career at The Washington Post Company ==
In late 1946, after a brief stint in the Pentagon, Hayes moved to New York to run WQXR, the classical music station run by the New York Times. A year later, he moved back to Washington to work for the Post Company as executive vice president, member of the board of directors and head of its radio, and later television, department.

In the mid-1940’s, the Post was the third biggest newspaper in Washington, behind the Times-Herald, which, like the Post, was a morning paper, and behind the Star, an evening paper. However, the next several years was a time of enormous growth for the paper, and in March of 1954, the Post Company bought out its morning competitor, the Times-Herald. This purchase gave the Post a "morning monopoly in the national capital, doubled its circulation, skyrocketed its advertising, and thereby produced a healthy financial basis on which it could, and would, become one of the world's major newspapers."

Throughout the time before this purchase, however, the paper consistently lost money. Phillip Graham, the driving force behind the paper and Hayes's boss, was one of the few men in the publishing industry at this time who understood the money to be made in the relatively new field of broadcasting. In 1944, under his guidance, the Post Company bought a small radio station in Washington called WINX. This station was the only holding of the broadcast division when Hayes joined the company in 1947.

In 1949, the Post sold WINX and, from CBS, bought the controlling interest of a much bigger radio station and renamed it WTOP. A year later, with CBS, the Post Company bought its first television station WOIC in Washington, which was renamed WTOP-TV. In 1953, at Hayes’s suggestion, the company bought WJXT-TV in Jacksonville, Florida. Then in 1954, it bought the remaining interest of WTOP radio and television from CBS.

During this period, "revenues from the radio and television were a major sustainer of the newspaper until its own consistent moneymaking era began with the Times-Herald purchase." Often, "if a reporter received a raise from Graham he sometimes received along with it a small lecture pointing out that his paycheck had come from WTOP."

As the Post grew in importance, so did Phil Graham, until, by the late 1950's he was a very important political force; in fact, Graham was responsible for the pairing of Kennedy and Johnson for the 1960 Democratic ticket. Along with Graham’s, Hayes's own political influence also grew. For the 1960 campaign, he worked with both Kennedy and Johnson, but primarily Johnson, on improving their usage of television. After the election, Hayes was asked to run the US Information Agency but turned the offer down because he did not "feel sufficiently secure financially."

In 1963, after Phil Graham shot and killed himself, his job was taken over by his wife, Katherine, and Hayes continued to run the broadcasting division.

During the 1964 presidential race, he again worked with Johnson, running the television aspects of the campaign. Television was becoming vitally important in politics. The Johnson-Humphrey campaign spent almost $2,000,000 on network television, roughly the same as the Republican ticket. The apparent television strategy was simple: because Johnson was well ahead in the polls, there was no reason to take any risks. Although seventy-one percent of those polled said that they wanted a televised debate, the Johnson campaign refused so as not to risk any mistakes.

While Hayes and the Johnson campaign refused to debate, they did release a devastating negative television ad - Daisy, which is considered one of the most important factors in Johnson's landslide victory, and a turning point in political and advertising history.

After the election, Hayes retired after a twenty-year career with the Post, culminating as president of Post-Newsweek Stations and as executive vice president and member of the board of directors of The Washington Post Co.

== As Ambassador to Switzerland ==
In August of 1966, three days after his fifty-sixth birthday, Hayes was asked by President Johnson to serve as Ambassador to Switzerland. In a later interview, Hayes revealed, "’I was very surprised at first, and I could think of a dozen reasons why I shouldn't take it’, ... adding that it would mean leaving home, dislocating his life, giving up his job, taking his son out of school, etc." "’But, I finally came to the conclusion that all of my reasons were basically selfish.’ ... He called the White House and accepted the offer the next day."

When asked what an ambassador does, Hayes replied, "An honest man who is sent overseas to lie for his country." However, later "in a more serious vein, he recalled the four major functions of an ambassador ...: [1] Transact U.S. business. [2] Reflect to his host country the opinions of his government and attitudes of the U.S. people. [3] Reflect to his country the feelings and attitudes of the host government and its people. [4] Protect all ... American citizens in the host country."

In 1967, while Hayes was Ambassador, Josef Stalin's daughter, Svetlana, defected to the West. She travelled to Switzerland where Hayes helped arrange her tourist visa and accommodations for six weeks before her trip to the United States.

== Post-Ambassadorial life ==
After the Democrats lost the Presidency in the 1968 election, Hayes resigned and returned to the U.S. in May of 1969. Having retired from the Post Company upon his appointment by Johnson, he moved to Ponte Vedra, Florida where he was to live the rest of his life. Later that year in 1969, Hayes became a member of the U.S. delegation to the International Conference on Satellite Communications.

In 1976, because of connections in the National Security Council and his broadcasting background, Hayes was asked to become chairman of the Radio Liberty committee. Later, he became chairman of Radio Free Europe and Radio Liberty.

Originally funded by the U.S. government, the mission of these organizations was to provide an unbiased news service for communist countries in the country's own language. Radio Free Europe was broadcast to Eastern-bloc countries, including Poland, Czechoslovakia, Romania, Bulgaria, and Hungary, while Radio Liberty was targeted at the Soviet Union. Hayes was to remain chairman until he died.

In 1981, Hayes died of congestive heart failure in Ponte Vedra Beach, Florida.
