= Lovell Rousseau =

American general and politician

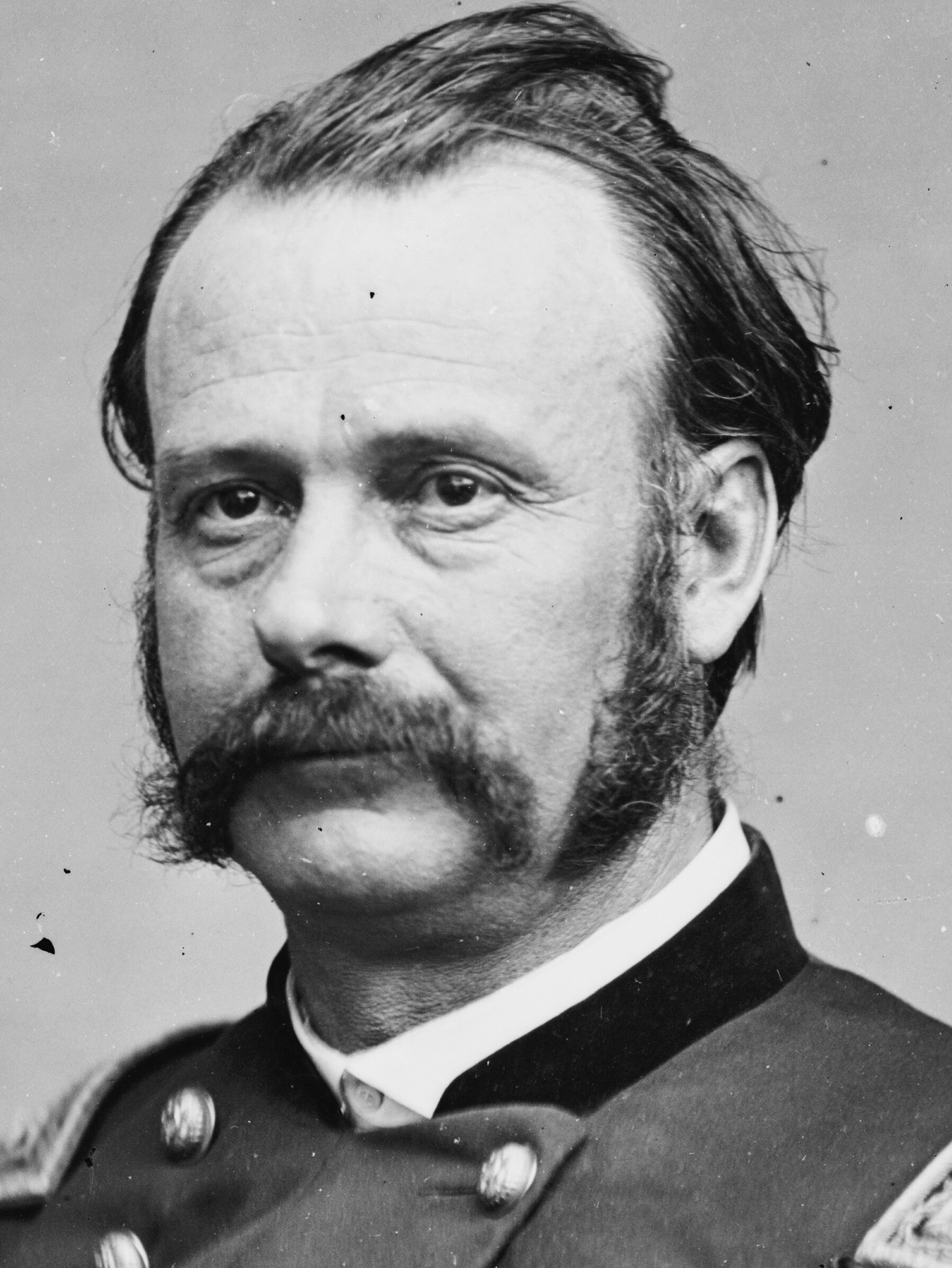
- Rousseau, 1860–1870

Member of the U.S. House of Representatives from Kentucky's 5th district
- In office December 3, 1866 – March 3, 1867
- Preceded by: Incumbent
- Succeeded by: Asa Grover
- In office March 4, 1865 – July 21, 1866
- Preceded by: Robert Mallory
- Succeeded by: Himself

Member of the Kentucky Senate from the 15th district
- In office November 1860 – June 1861
- Preceded by: John G. Lyons
- Succeeded by: James Speed; Charles T. Worthington

Personal details
- Born: Lovell Harrison Rousseau; August 4, 1818 near Stanford, Kentucky, U.S.
- Died: January 7, 1869 (aged 50) New Orleans, Louisiana, U.S.
- Resting place: Arlington National Cemetery; Arlington, Virginia, U.S.
- Party: Whig; Unconditional Union
- Spouse: Maria Dozier

Military service
- Branch/service: United States Army (Union Army)
- Years of service: 1846–1847; 1861–1865; 1867–1869
- Rank: Major General
- Commands: 5th Kentucky Infantry Regiment; Department of Louisiana
- Battles/wars: Mexican-American War • Battle of Buena Vista; American Civil War • Battle of Perryville • Battle of Stones River • Tullahoma Campaign • Third Battle of Murfreesboro

Lovell Harrison Rousseau (August 4, 1818 – January 7, 1869) was a general in the Union Army during the American Civil War, as well as a lawyer and politician in Kentucky and Indiana.

Rousseau was a member of the Whig Party early in his political career and later became a member of the Unconditional Union Party. He was a member of the Indiana State Senate from 1847 to 1849 and was a member of the Kentucky State Senate from 1860 to 1861. During the Civil War, Rousseau served in the Union Army as a colonel, a brigadier general, and a major general. He served in the Thirty-ninth Congress, resigned, and was re-elected to Congress. Rousseau was censured by the House of Representatives in 1866 for assaulting Rep. Josiah B. Grinnell on the House floor.

Rousseau was made a brigadier general in the U.S. Army in 1867 and given the brevet rank of major general. Thereafter, he served in Alaska and Louisiana.

== Early life and career ==
Born near Stanford, Kentucky, on August 4, 1818, Rousseau attended the common schools as a child. His father, David Rousseau, brought his family across the Appalachians from Virginia, but he had a difficult time regaining economic equilibrium (despite extensive holdings in undeveloped land and slaves). Lovell's elder brother had already left home, so when their father died of cholera attempting to move the family to a new home in 1833, it fell to Lovell and his younger brothers to dig their father's roadside grave. At age fifteen, he had become his family's primary breadwinner. Soon afterwards, he was forced to sell his family's slaves in an effort to cover the family's debts.

Eager to earn a wage, he began working on a road-building crew, traveling around the Midwest. Determined to rise, he studied grammar, mathematics, and French, and returned to Kentucky where he read law in Louisville, Kentucky, for several months. In 1841, he passed the Indiana bar examination and began practicing law with his brother, Richard Hillaire Rousseau, as junior partners in a firm led by James I. Dozier, in Bloomfield, Indiana. Both brothers married Dozier's daughters. Richard married Mary E. Dozier in 1839, while Lovell married Maria A. Dozier in 1843. (Mary Dozier Rousseau died young, and Richard remarried.)

Lovell successfully ran for the Indiana House of Representatives as a Whig candidate in 1844, and in 1846 he was commissioned as a captain in the Mexican–American War and charged with raising a company of volunteers. He led them at the Battle of Buena Vista, where he helped rally the Indiana troops at a key point in the battle.

When he returned from the war, he gained a seat in the Indiana Senate and continued to run a successful law practice.

After relocating to Louisville, Kentucky, he served in the Kentucky Senate from 1860 to 1861.

== Civil War ==
As the Civil War was becoming more and more likely, Rousseau decided in favor of maintaining state government in Kentucky and helped keep it from seceding from the Union. He resigned from his seat in the senate in June 1861 and applied for a commission to raise volunteers. Against the opposition of many prominent figures in Kentucky, he succeeded in raising two regiments composed entirely of Kentuckians at Camp Joe Holt, across the Ohio River from Louisville in Jeffersonville, Indiana. They were known as the Louisville Legion. With the help of a battalion of the Louisville Home Guard, the regiments saved Louisville from being captured by Confederate troops. He was appointed colonel of the 5th Kentucky Infantry Regiment in September 1861 and was later promoted to brigadier general of Volunteers attached to the army of General Ormsby M. Mitchel.

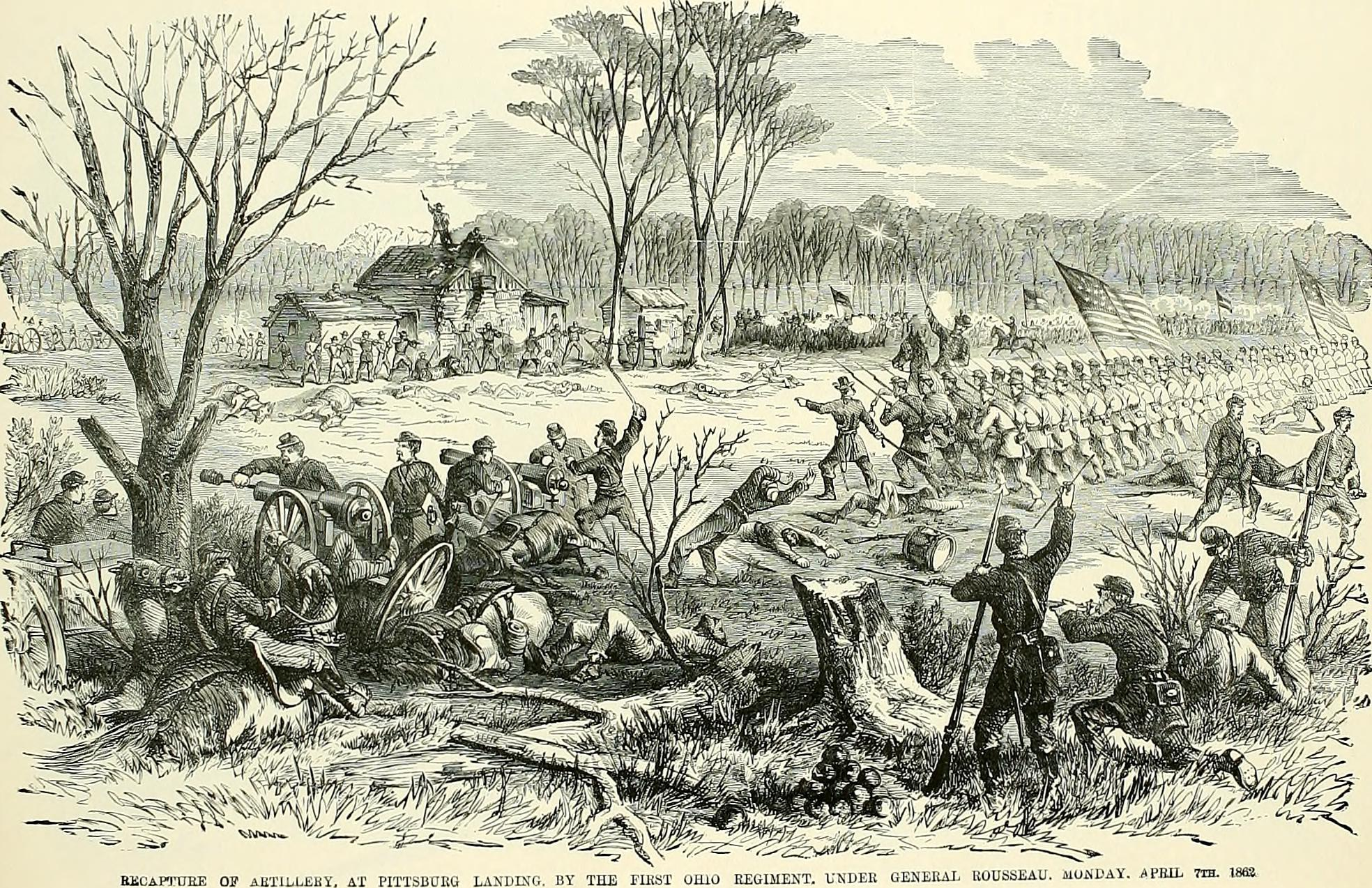
Recapture of guns at Pittsburg Landing, April 7, 1862

Later, Rousseau was once again promoted to major general of Volunteers. He served valiantly at the Battles of Shiloh, Perryville, Stones River, during the Battle of Hoover's Gap in the Tullahoma Campaign, and movements around Chattanooga, Tennessee. Although from November 1863 until his resignation in November 1865, Rousseau had command of Nashville, Tennessee, he had also, on Sherman's orders, carried out a very successful raid on the Montgomery and West Point Railroad in July 1864.

== House of Representatives and assault on Josiah B. Grinnell ==
Rousseau was elected as an Unconditional Unionist to the United States House of Representatives in 1864, serving from 1865 to 1867. As a former military officer, he served on the Committee on Military Affairs. In June 1866, relations between Rousseau and Iowa Representative Josiah B. Grinnell became tense. The two had a series of debates over a bill intended to give more power to the Freedman's Bureau. Rousseau opposed the bill, having seen and heard about rebellious and illegal actions by Bureau agents, whereas Grinnell, a former active abolitionist and helper to runaway slaves, strongly supported it. The debates eventually turned into mudslinging; Grinnell questioned Rousseau's military record and insulted his performance in battle, and made disparaging comments about Kentucky.

On June 14, 1866, Rousseau approached Grinnell in the east portico of the Capitol after a session of Congress. He told Grinnell that he had been waiting for an apology from him for the insults he made about him before the House. Grinnell pretended not to know what Rousseau was talking about, enraging Rousseau, who struck him repeatedly with the iron handle of his rattan cane until it broke. He struck him chiefly in the face but a few blows hit Grinnell's hand and shoulder. Grinnell walked away with only bruises and did not have to absent himself from Congress. However, a committee was organized to investigate the incident, composed of Nathaniel P. Banks, Henry J. Raymond, Rufus P. Spalding, M. Russell Thayer, and John Hogan.

Rousseau was censured by the House on July 17, 1866, for his assault on Grinnell. He resigned from Congress on July 21, 1866, but later won a special election to fill the vacancy caused by his resignation and continued to serve in Congress until 1867.

== Personal life ==
Rousseau's daughter, Mary E. Rousseau, married Louis Douglas Watkins, USV, in Jefferson County, Kentucky, on August 4, 1864.

== Later life and death ==
After leaving the House of Representatives, Rousseau was appointed brigadier general in the U.S. Army with the brevet rank of major general, and was assigned to duty in Alaska on March 27, 1867. General Rousseau played a key role in the transfer of Alaska from the Russian Empire to the United States on October 18, 1867, today celebrated as Alaska Day. On July 28, 1868, he was placed in command of the Department of Louisiana. He died in this capacity in New Orleans, Louisiana, on January 7, 1869. He was interred in Cave Hill National Cemetery in Louisville, Kentucky; in 1892, his wife had his body removed from Cave Hill and re-interred at Arlington National Cemetery in Arlington, Virginia. His monument at Cave Hill remains.

== See also ==
- List of American Civil War generals (Union)
- Louisville in the American Civil War
- List of federal political scandals in the United States
- List of United States representatives expelled, censured, or reprimanded

== Notes ==
U.S. House of Representatives
Preceded by Robert Mallory	Member of the U.S. House of Representatives from Kentucky's 5th congressional district 1865–1866	Succeeded by Himself
Preceded by Himself	Member of the U.S. House of Representatives from Kentucky's 5th congressional district 1866–1867	Succeeded by Asa Grover
