= SS Henry Watterson =

Liberty ship of WWII

History

United States
- Name: Henry Watterson
- Namesake: Henry Watterson
- Owner: War Shipping Administration (WSA)
- Operator: American Export Lines Inc.
- Ordered: as type (EC2-S-C1) hull, MC hull 1201
- Builder: St. Johns River Shipbuilding Company, Jacksonville, Florida
- Cost: $2,232,439
- Yard number: 9
- Way number: 3
- Laid down: 19 April 1943
- Launched: 21 July 1943
- Sponsored by: Mrs. Jack E. Schmeltzer
- Completed: 18 August 1943
- Identification: Call sign: KIWC
- Fate: Placed in the James River Reserve Fleet, Lee Hall, Virginia, 11 May 1946; Sold for commercial use, 24 June 1947, withdrawn from fleet, 7 July 1947

Norway
- Name: Spurt
- Owner: A/S Lundegaard and Soenner
- Fate: Sold, 1961

Lebanon
- Name: Spartan
- Owner: Compania Mar Angelikana
- Fate: Grounded, Pasa Buenavista, Cuba, 13 December 1961; Refloated and towed to Havana, 29 May 1962; Declared Constructive Total Loss (CTL), scrapped

General characteristics
- Class & type: Liberty ship; type EC2-S-C1, standard
- Tonnage: 10,865 LT DWT; 7,176 GRT
- Displacement: 3,380 long tons (3,434 t) (light); 14,245 long tons (14,474 t) (max)
- Length: 441 feet 6 inches (135 m) oa; 416 feet (127 m) pp; 427 feet (130 m) lwl
- Beam: 57 feet (17 m)
- Draft: 27 ft 9.25 in (8.4646 m)
- Installed power: 2 × Oil fired 450 °F (232 °C) boilers, operating at 220 psi (1,500 kPa); 2,500 hp (1,900 kW)
- Propulsion: 1 × triple-expansion steam engine, (manufactured by Filer and Stowell, Milwaukee, Wisconsin); 1 × screw propeller
- Speed: 11.5 knots (21.3 km/h; 13.2 mph)
- Capacity: 562,608 cubic feet (15,931 m^{3}) (grain); 499,573 cubic feet (14,146 m^{3}) (bale)
- Complement: 38–62 USMM; 21–40 USNAG
- Armament: Varied by ship; Bow-mounted 3-inch (76 mm)/50-caliber gun; Stern-mounted 4-inch (102 mm)/50-caliber gun; 2–8 × single 20-millimeter (0.79 in) Oerlikon anti-aircraft (AA) cannons and/or, 2–8 × 37-millimeter (1.46 in) M1 AA guns

SS Henry Watterson was a Liberty ship built in the United States during World War II. She was named after Henry Watterson, an American journalist, partial term US Congressman from Kentucky, and Pulitzer Prize winner in 1918, for two editorials supporting U.S. entry into World War I.

== Construction ==
Henry Watterson was laid down on 19 April 1943, under a Maritime Commission (MARCOM) contract, MC hull 1201, by the St. Johns River Shipbuilding Company, Jacksonville, Florida; she was sponsored by Mrs. Jack E. Schmeltzer, the widow of the former Technical Assistant to Rear Admiral Howard L. Vickery, MARCOM, she was launched on 21 July 1943.

== History ==
She was allocated to American Export Lines Inc., on 18 August 1943. On 11 May 1946, she was placed in the James River Reserve Fleet, Lee Hall, Virginia. She was sold for commercial use, on 24 June 1947, to A/S Lundegaard and Soenner, renamed Spurt and flagged in Norway. She was withdrawn from the fleet, 7 July 1947. On 13 December 1961, while operating as Spartan and flagged in Lebanon, she ran aground in Pasa Buenavista, Cuba. After being refloated, she was towed to Havana, on 29 May 1962. She was declared a constructive total loss (CTL) and scrapped.

== Bibliography ==
- "St. John's River Shipbuilding, Jacksonville FL". www.ShipbuildingHistory.com. 16 October 2010.
- Maritime Administration. "Henry Watterson". Ship History Database Vessel Status Card. U.S. Department of Transportation, Maritime Administration.
- Davies, James (May 2004). "Specifications (As-Built)" (PDF). p. 23.
- "SS Henry Watterson".
