= Elisha Standiford =

American politician (1831–1887)

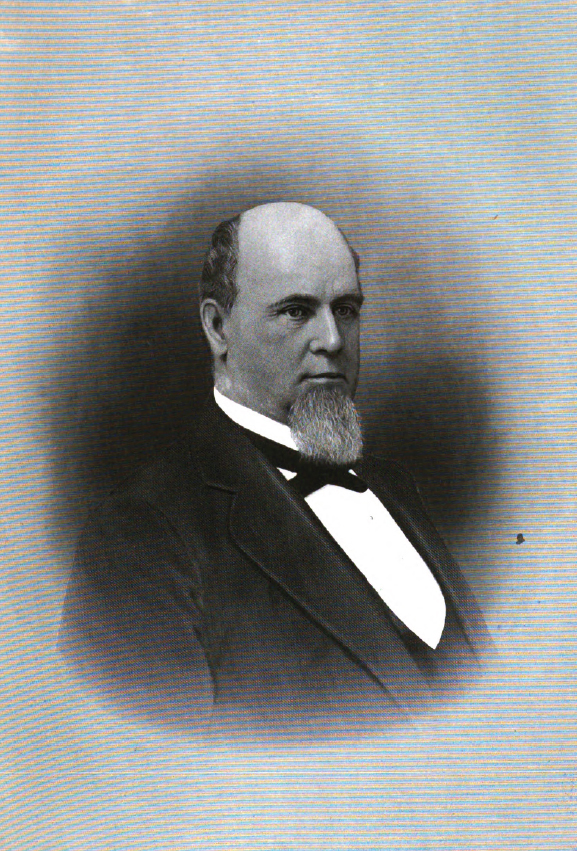

Member of the U.S. House of Representatives from Kentucky's 5th district
- In office March 4, 1873 – March 3, 1875
- Preceded by: Boyd Winchester
- Succeeded by: Edward Y. Parsons

Member of the Kentucky Senate from the 35th district
- In office November 1868 – February 18, 1873
- Preceded by: Boyd Winchester
- Succeeded by: I. L. Hyatt

Personal details
- Born: December 28, 1831 Louisville, Kentucky, U.S.
- Died: July 26, 1887 (aged 55) Louisville, Kentucky, U.S.
- Resting place: Cave Hill Cemetery; Louisville, Kentucky, U.S.
- Party: Democratic
- Spouse(s): Mary A. E. Neill (died 1875) Lorena Scott
- Education: Kentucky School of Medicine

Elisha David Standiford (December 28, 1831 – July 26, 1887) was a United States representative from Kentucky. He was born near Louisville, Kentucky. He attended the common schools and St. Mary's College, near Lebanon, Kentucky. He graduated from the Kentucky School of Medicine and commenced practice in Louisville, Kentucky. Later, he abandoned the practice of medicine and engaged in agricultural pursuits and other enterprises.

Standiford was a member of the Kentucky Senate in 1868 and 1871. He was elected as a Democrat to the Forty-third Congress (March 4, 1873 – March 3, 1875) but declined a renomination in 1874 to the Forty-fourth Congress. After leaving Congress, he was president of the Louisville & Nashville Railroad Company from 1875 to 1879. In addition, he engaged in banking and agricultural pursuits. In July 1887, recently married and a candidate for the U.S. Senate, he died in Louisville, Kentucky and was buried in Cave Hill Cemetery.

Louisville's largest airport was originally named Standiford Field before being changed to Louisville International Airport in 1995. On January 16, 2019, the Regional Airport Authority voted to change the name of the airport to Louisville Muhammad Ali International Airport in honor of the boxer and Louisville native Muhammad Ali. The airport today still retains the airport code of SDF.

U.S. House of Representatives
Preceded by Boyd Winchester	Member of the U.S. House of Representatives from Kentucky's 5th congressional district March 4, 1873 – March 3, 1875	Succeeded by Edward Y. Parsons
