= Peter R. Coneway =

American investment banker and diplomat (1944–2020)

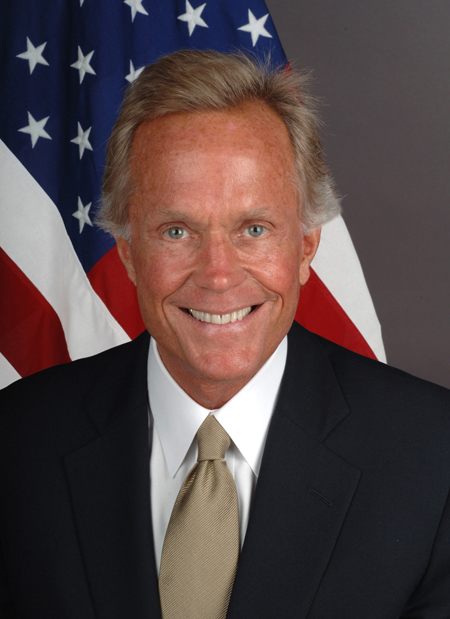
- Official portrait, 2006

United States Ambassador to Switzerland and Liechtenstein
- In office October 19, 2006 – December 7, 2008
- President: George W. Bush
- Preceded by: Pamela Willeford
- Succeeded by: Don Beyer

Personal details
- Born: Peter Richard Coneway; April 13, 1944 Harlingen, Texas, U.S.
- Died: November 13, 2020 (aged 76) Houston, Texas, U.S.
- Party: Republican
- Spouse: Lynn Martin (m. 1967)
- Children: 2
- Education: Harlingen High School
- Alma mater: University of Texas at Austin (BBA); Stanford University (MBA)

Peter Richard Coneway (April 13, 1944 - November 13, 2020) was an American investment banker and politician. He served as the United States Ambassador to Switzerland and Liechtenstein from 2006 to 2008. He was the founder of the Houston office of Goldman Sachs in 1975. He also served a six-year term on the Board of Regents at the University of Texas System appointed by governor Ann Richards in 1993.

== Early life and education ==
Coneway was born April 13, 1944, in Harlingen, Texas, one of three sons born to Albert Earl and Clara Laroux (Durham) Coneway. His father was a city attorney. Coneway was a running back for the Harlingen High School Cardinals football team. He earned a BBA in 1966 from the McCombs School of Business at the University of Texas at Austin and in 1969, an MBA from the Stanford Graduate School of Business.

== Career ==
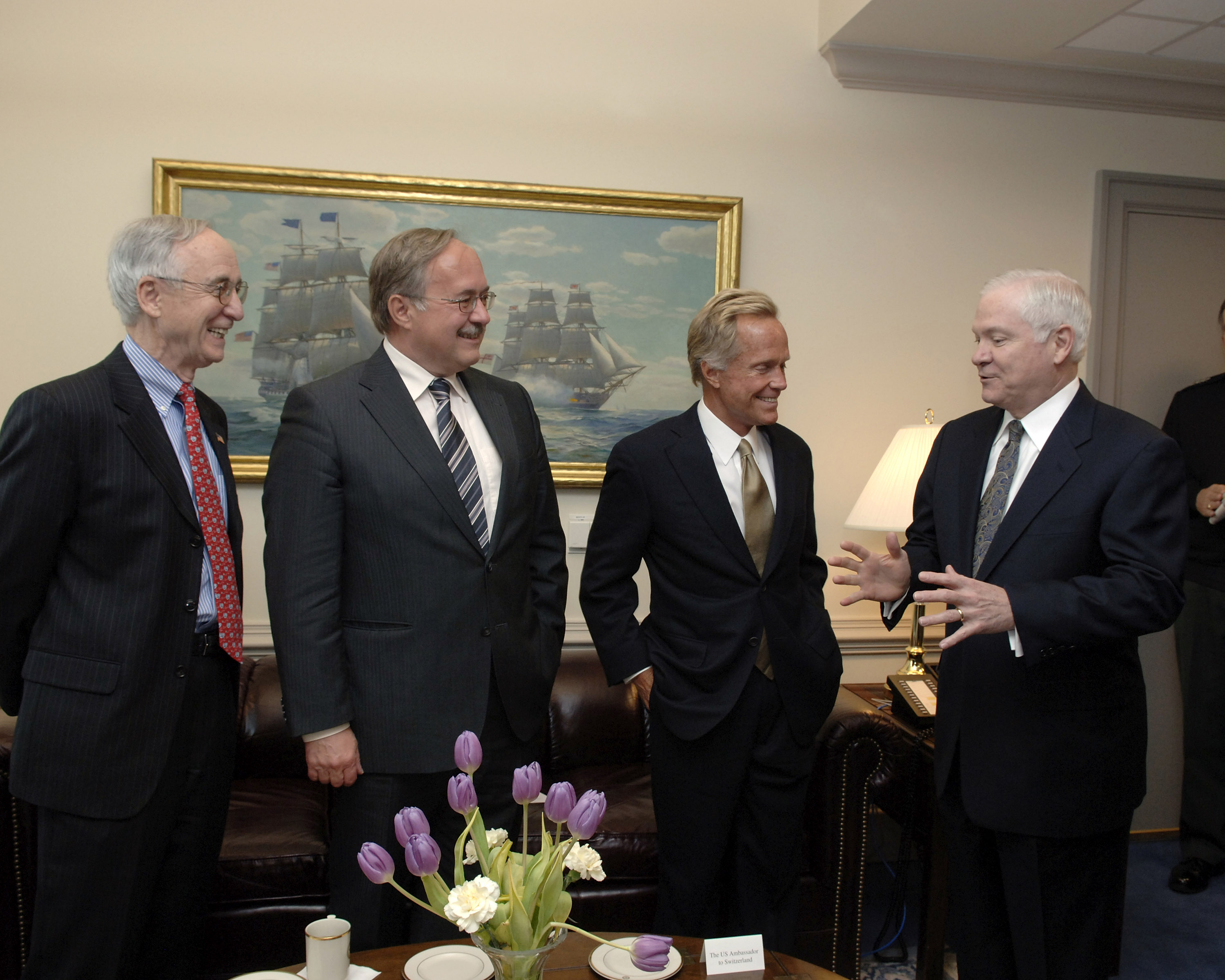
Secretary of Defense Robert M. Gates (right) stops by during a meeting with Deputy Secretary of Defense Gordon England (left) and Swiss Minister of Defense Samuel Schmid (second from left) and U.S. Ambassador to Switzerland Peter R. Coneway (second from right) in the Pentagon on April 13, 2007.

Coneway served in several leadership positions for Goldman Sachs for whom he worked from 1969 until he retired as general partner in November 1992. Those positions included resident manager of the Houston office, becoming resident partner in 1978. In 1987 and 1988, he was managing director of the company's Tokyo office.

Appointed by Ann Richards to be a University of Texas Regent in February 1993, he resigned on August 12, 1993, because he continued to have “a limited business relationship” with Goldman Sachs and he wanted “to avoid any appearance of conflict of interest.”

In 2009, Riverstone Holdings LLC named him managing director.

== US Ambassador to Switzerland and Liechtenstein ==
Coneway was a non-career appointee by George W. Bush. He was appointed on September 7, 2006, and presented his credentials on October 19, 2006. He was also accredited to the Principality of Liechtenstein. He succeeded Pamela Pitzer Willeford. He left his post on December 7, 2008. Coneway was succeeded by Don Beyer who assumed office on September 8, 2009.

== Personal life ==
Coneway married Lynn Martin in 1967. They had two daughters. Charles Richard Puckett, Coneway’s grandson, is currently aspiring to take in his grandfather’s footsteps in pursuing a career in politics and international diplomacy.

Diplomatic posts
Preceded by Pamela Willeford	United States Ambassador to Switzerland and Liechtenstein; 2006–2008	Succeeded by Don Beyer
