= Pamela Willeford =

American diplomat

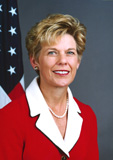

United States Ambassador to Switzerland and Liechtenstein
- In office October 27, 2003 – September 2006
- President: George W. Bush
- Preceded by: Mercer Reynolds
- Succeeded by: Peter R. Coneway

Personal details
- Born: Pamela Pitzer; March 3, 1950 (age 76) U.S.
- Spouse: George Willeford III
- Children: 2
- Education: The Hockaday School
- Alma mater: University of Texas at Austin

Pamela Pitzer Willeford (born March 3, 1950) is an American diplomat who served as the United States Ambassador to Switzerland and Liechtenstein between 2003 and 2006. She is also notable as being the sole eyewitness of the 2006 hunting incident where then-United States Vice President Dick Cheney accidentally shot attorney Harry Whittington in the face and chest.

== Biography ==
Willeford grew up in Breckenridge, Texas and attended The Hockaday School in Dallas. She graduated from the University of Texas at Austin with a BA in English and Spanish. She became a public and private school teacher in Dallas, starting around the early 1970s. During the 1980s, she was a trustee of St. Andrew’s Episcopal School in Austin; she worked prominently in the expansion of the school. On the Texas State Preservation Board, she has been Director of Development and coordinated its Texas Capitol Rededication project. She began serving on the Board and the Executive Committee of the Texas Book Festival upon their creation in 1996, and as of 2003, had continued to without interruption.

Willeford worked on developing education policy and promoting community service in Texas. She was appointed to the Texas Higher Education Coordinating Board in 1995, by Governor George W. Bush. She served on the board for eight years, being promoted to chairwoman in 1998. During her tenure as chairwoman, the Board developed a new higher-education plan for the state.

She has been involved in numerous civic organizations, including The Helping Hand Home for Children, SafePlace Center for Battered Women, Trinity Episcopal School, The Bob Bullock Texas State History Museum and the Junior League of Austin. She was awarded "Volunteer Extraordinaire" by the Junior League of Austin in 2002 and "Woman of Distinction" from the Girl Scouts Lone Star Council in 2003. She has also served as Advisory Committee Chairman for The Laura Bush Foundation for America's Libraries and is currently its chairperson.

On July 30, 2003, President Bush nominated Willeford as U.S. Ambassador to Switzerland and Liechtenstein in anticipation of Mercer Reynolds III leaving that post. She was sworn in on October 27, 2003. She served until September 2006 and was succeeded by Peter R. Coneway.

She is a long-time Bush family friend, and she and her immediate family have given a total of $23,200 to Republicans during the 2000, 2002, and 2004 election cycles.

In 2013, the University of Texas at Austin awarded her the Presidential Citation.

=== Hunting incident ===
On February 11, 2006, she was the only witness when Dick Cheney accidentally shot Texas attorney Harry Whittington during a quail hunt.

=== Personal life ===
She is married to Dr. George "Boots" Willeford III, an Austin physician. They have two grown children.

Diplomatic posts
Preceded by Mercer Reynolds	United States Ambassador to Switzerland and Liechtenstein; 2003–2006	Succeeded by Peter R. Coneway
