= Joseph Bernard Gildenhorn =

American lawyer (1929–2023)

- Gildenhorn, c. 1989

United States Ambassador to Switzerland and Liechtenstein
- In office August 3, 1989 – March 1, 1993
- President: George H. W. Bush
- Preceded by: Philip D. Winn
- Succeeded by: M. Larry Lawrence

Personal details
- Born: Joseph Bernard Gildenhorn; September 17, 1929 Washington, D.C., U.S.
- Died: October 21, 2023 (aged 94) Washington, D.C., U.S.
- Education: University of Maryland (BS); Yale University (LLB, JD)
- Occupation: Businessman; attorney; philanthropist

Joseph Bernard Gildenhorn (/ˈɡɪldənˌhɔːrn/; September 17, 1929 – October 21, 2023) was the U.S. Ambassador to Switzerland from 1989 to 1993 and was a co-founder of JBG Smith.

== Biography ==
=== Early life and education ===
Gildenhorn was born September 17, 1929 in Washington, D.C., to Oscar, a retail grocer, and Celia Gildenhorn. Both of his parents were born in the Russian Empire (presently Poland) and immigrated to the United States in the early 20th century.

Gildenhorn graduated from Jackson-Reed High School (then called Woodrow Wilson High School). He then received a B.S. degree in Business Administration from the University of Maryland. He graduated from Yale Law School in 1954 where he was a member of the Editorial Board of the Yale Law Journal and Order of the Coif.

=== Career ===
After law school, Gildenhorn served in the United States Army and was stationed in Germany. Upon returning to Washington, he worked for the U.S. Securities and Exchange Commission.

In 1956, Gildenhorn and high school friends Donald Brown and Gerald Miller founded a law firm. In 1962, they became real estate developers in the Washington, D.C. area forming what later became JBG Smith.

Gildenhorn was a long-time supporter of the Republican Party and George H. W. Bush. Gildenhorn was the U.S. Ambassador to Switzerland from 1989 to 1993, appointed by George H. W. Bush.

Gildenhorn served as Chairman of the Board of Trustees of the Woodrow Wilson International Center for Scholars from 2002 to 2013, appointed by George W. Bush.

Gildenhorn was President of the Jewish Federation of Greater Washington and the Hebrew Home of Greater Washington. He also served on the board of directors of the Joint Distribution Committee.

== Personal life ==
Gildenhorn was married to Alma Lee Gross, whom he met while a student at the University of Maryland. They had two children: Carol Winer and Michael Gildenhorn.

Gildenhorn was a financial supporter of John F. Kennedy Center for the Performing Arts and the Institute for Bone and Joint Health of Sibley Memorial Hospital. He also endowed the University of Maryland’s Gildenhorn Institute for Israel Studies and the Gildenhorn Recital Hall at The Clarice Smith Performing Arts Center.

Gildenhorn died in Washington D.C. on October 21, 2023, at the age of 94.

Diplomatic posts
Preceded by Philip D. Winn	United States Ambassador to Switzerland; 1989–1993	Succeeded by M. Larry Lawrence
