= Suzan G. LeVine =

American diplomat

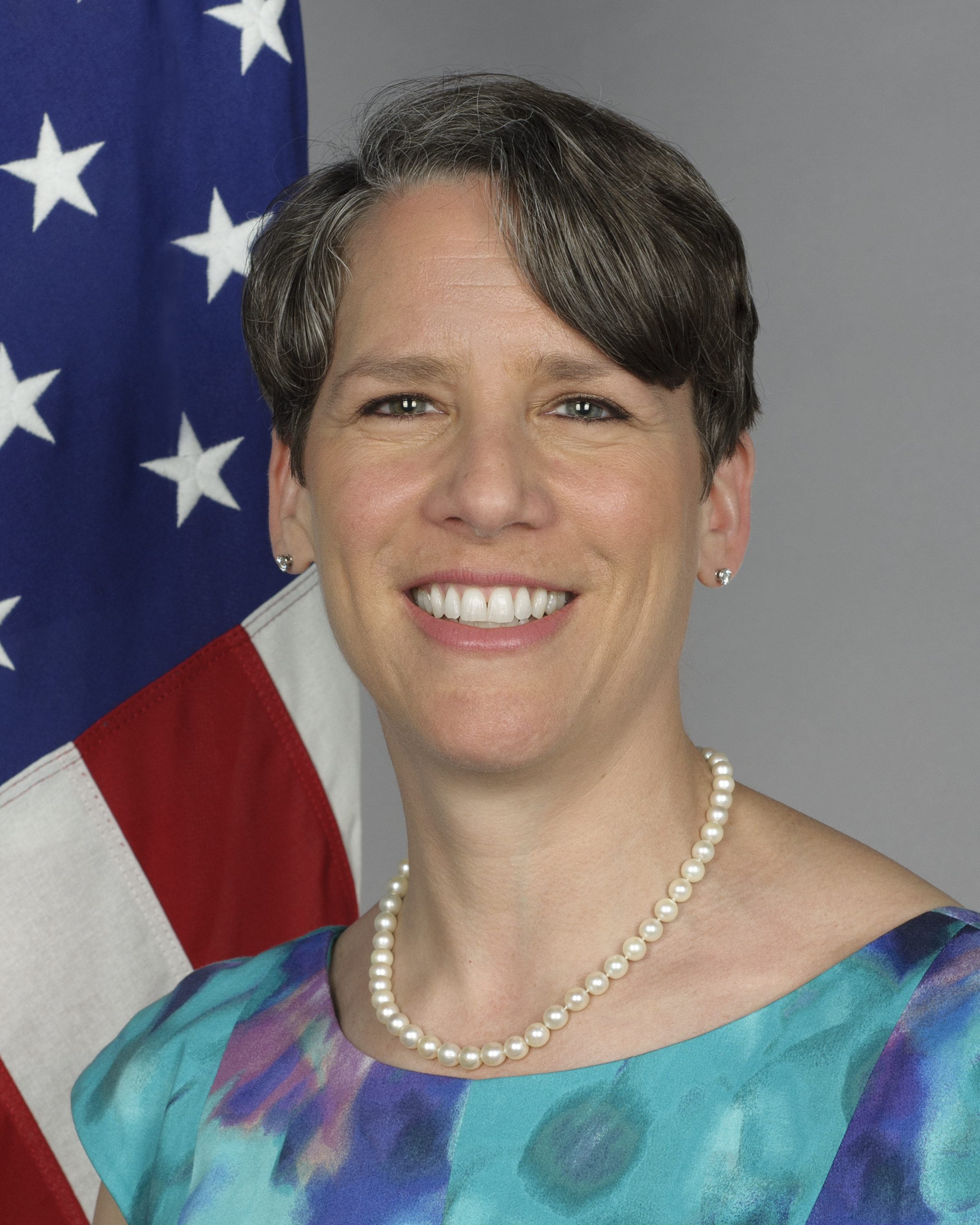

Assistant Secretary for Employment & Training
- Acting
- In office January 28, 2021 – August 20, 2021
- President: Joe Biden
- Preceded by: John Pallach
- Succeeded by: Angela Hanks (acting)

United States Ambassador to Switzerland and Liechtenstein
- In office June 5, 2014 – January 20, 2017
- President: Barack Obama
- Preceded by: Don Beyer
- Succeeded by: Ed McMullen

Personal details
- Born: Suzan Gail Davidson; November 17, 1969 (age 56) Pennsylvania, U.S.
- Party: Democratic
- Spouse: Eric LeVine
- Children: 2
- Education: Brown University (BA)

Suzan Gail LeVine (born November 17, 1969) is an American businesswoman and diplomat who served as the United States Ambassador to Switzerland and Liechtenstein from 2014 to 2017. She also served as assistant secretary in the Employment and Training Administration for seven months in 2021, and as Commissioner of the Washington State Employment Security Department in the administration of Governor Jay Inslee.

== Early life and education ==
Suzan Gail LeVine was born near Philadelphia and grew up in Ventnor City, New Jersey. In 1993, she earned a Bachelor of Science in mechanical engineering with aerospace applications and a Bachelor of Arts in English from Brown University. She also received an honorary doctorate from EPFL, the Swiss Federal Institute of Technology in Lausanne, in October 2017.

== Career ==
=== Information technology ===
LeVine's career started in technology with college summer internships at NASA's Jet Propulsion Laboratory and Carnegie Mellon's Data Storage System's Center. She then started her first full-time job working on operating systems at Microsoft in 1993 where she worked on MS-DOS and then helped launch Windows 95. She ran communications for the Expedia IPO and stayed with Expedia until 2005, becoming Vice President of Sales & Marketing in the Luxury Travel Division. In 2009, she went back to Microsoft and focused on education until 2012.

=== Non-profit ===
In 2006, LeVine and Rabbi Rachel Nussbaum co-founded the Kavana Cooperative. The same year, she co-founded the advisory board for the Institute for Learning and Brain Sciences (I-LABS) at the University of Washington with Bill Henningsgaard.

=== Democratic Fundraiser ===
LeVine was Democratic Party Fundraiser for the Obama-Biden 2008 and 2012 campaigns

=== Ambassador to Switzerland and Liechtenstein ===
LeVine was sworn in as the United States Ambassador to Switzerland and Liechtenstein on May 30, 2014, and took up her position in Bern on June 2, 2014. LeVine took her oath of office while placing a hand on a Kindle containing the U.S. Constitution and, thereby, became the first U.S. official to be sworn in on an e-reader. She resigned her post in Bern on January 20, 2017.

During her tenure, LeVine's worked to expand foreign direct investment (FDI) into the U.S., counter violent extremism, enable American citizens in Switzerland to regain access to banking services, and advance a global diversity dialogue. She also advocated female participation in entrepreneurship and technical fields in both corporations and universities.

While in Switzerland, LeVine was instrumental in the signing of a Joint Declaration of Intent between Switzerland and the United States to collaborate on apprenticeship and partnered with 30 companies to bring or expand their Swiss style apprenticeship model into the United States. She also secured billions of dollars in investment and hundreds of jobs into the United States. During their time in Switzerland, Ambassador LeVine and her husband, Eric LeVine, hosted a number of visitors from the United States to view the Swiss system. Most notable was a delegation from Colorado led by Governor John Hickenlooper. LeVine and her husband continued to speak in favor of the Swiss dual education system after returning to the United States.

=== Post-ambassadorial career ===
On July 9, 2018, LeVine joined Governor of Washington Jay Inslee's cabinet as the new Commissioner of the Employment Security Department. She was responsible for the state's unemployment insurance system, the new paid family and medical leave program, the funding administration for the WorkSource system, the labor market information, aspects of the H-2A and H-2B foreign guest worker programs, and the Washington State Service Corps program. During the COVID-19 pandemic in 2020, the ESD was the target of an international fraud scheme. 87,000 claims worth $650,000,000 was sent overseas to fraudulent accounts.

LeVine now serves on the CareerWise Colorado board, the Markle Foundation's Rework America Task Force, ETH's CEMETS International Advisory Board, and the Seattle Region Partnership. She also served on Governor Inslee's Career Connect Taskforce which completed its work and made its recommendations Feb 20, 2018. She is a member of the Council of American Ambassadors.

In 2021, LeVine served as the acting Assistant Secretary of the Employment and Training Administration (ETA) under the Biden administration. She resigned after seven months, citing the job's impact on her family.

LeVine has volunteered as a community organizer and resource raiser for several Democratic campaigns, most notably, for Obama for America. She currently serves as a Deputy National Finance Chair for the DNC and as an Advisory Council Member for the NDRC (National Democratic Redistricting Council).

== Personal life ==
LeVine and her husband, Eric LeVine, CEO of CellarTracker, have two children.

Diplomatic posts
Preceded by Don Beyer	United States Ambassador to Liechtenstein; 2014–2017	Succeeded by Ed McMullen
Preceded by Don Beyer	United States Ambassador to Switzerland; 2014–2017	Succeeded by Ed McMullen
