= Camp Joe Holt =

American Civil War Union base in Indiana

Coordinates: 38.278326°N 85.764290°W

Camp Joe Holt was a Union base during the American Civil War in Jeffersonville, Indiana, across the Ohio River from Louisville, Kentucky, on land that is now part of Clarksville, Indiana, near the Big Eddy. It was a major staging area for troops in the Western Theatre of the War, in preparation for invading the Confederate States of America. Its establishment was the first major step performed by Kentucky Unionists to keep Kentucky from seceding to the Confederacy.

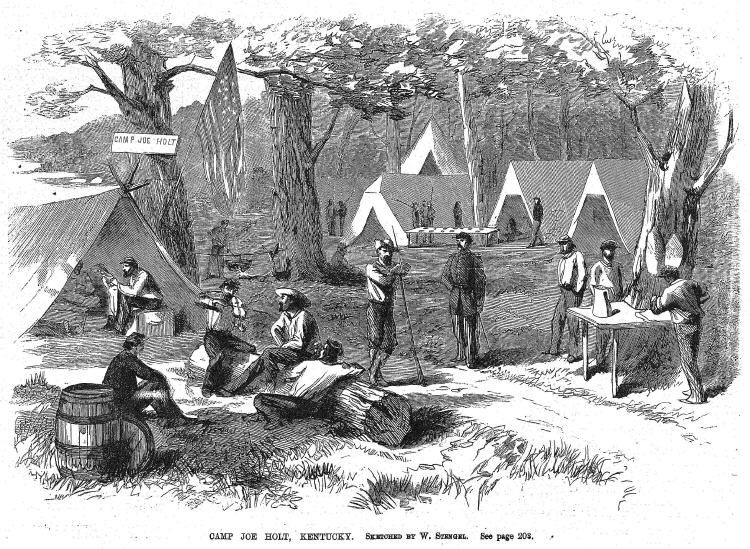
Camp Joe Holt - 1861

Built on land leased from Colonel S. H. Patterson, it was named in honor of Joseph Holt, who became Buchanan's Secretary of War for about 60 days after John B. Floyd resigned. Holt strongly supported the Union. Colonel Lovell Rousseau opened the facility in June 1861 in order to recruit Kentuckians, mostly Louisvillians, into the Union Army. A pine board with the words Camp Joe Holt was nailed into a tree by the entrance to the camp on the second day of operations by a Captain Trainor.

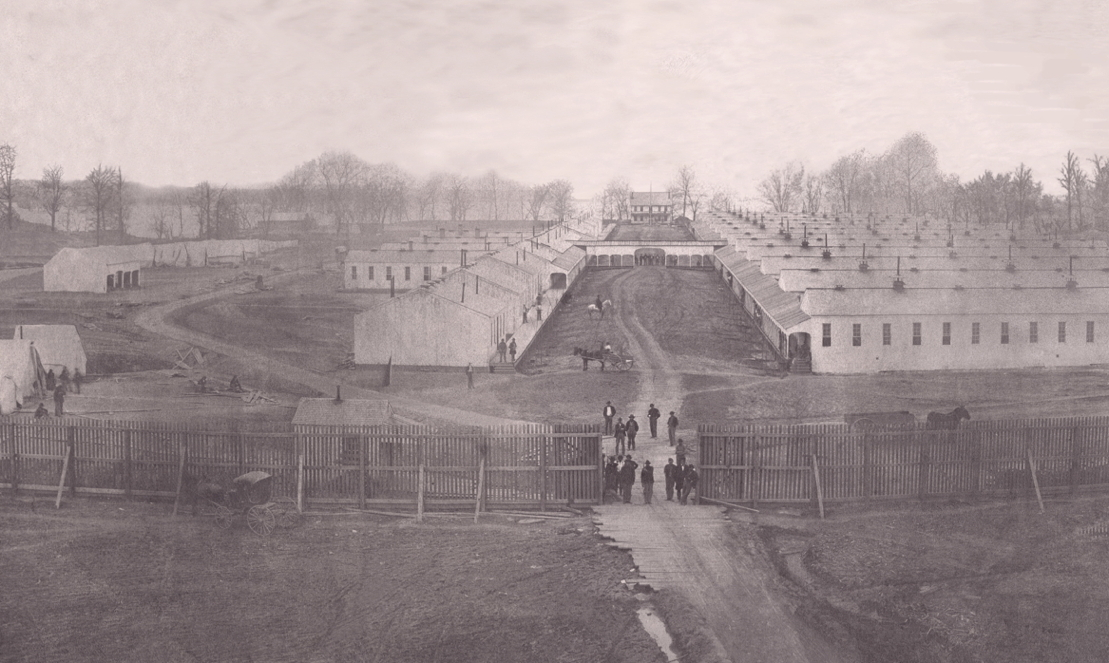
Camp Joe Holt, full view - 1862

The Camp was built in Indiana due to fears that recruiting camps in Kentucky would encourage Kentucky to secede to the Confederacy. (A Confederate state government would eventually form in Kentucky, but the Union state government never dissolved.) By early September 1861, he had recruited over 2,000 such individuals, which formed the Fifth Kentucky Volunteer Infantry Regiment, nicknamed the Louisville Legion.

The 49th Indiana Infantry was organized at Camp Joe Holt by Colonel John W. Ray, a former city councilman of Jeffersonville. Assisting him in the endeavor was the former member of the Clark Guards, Lieutenant Colonel James Keigwin. This was the only regiment formed in Clark County, Indiana.

Camp Joe Holt would serve as a rendezvous hospital in 1862 until February 1864 when Jefferson General Hospital was opened in Port Fulton, Indiana, 1.5 miles upstream. It then reverted to a camp until the end of the war.

Mr. Patterson reserved the right to remove the government chapel which would later become St. Paul's Episcopal Church.

== See also ==
- American Civil War fortifications in Louisville
- Louisville in the American Civil War
- Indiana in the American Civil War
