= CellarTracker =

Online wine database

CellarTracker is a website that stores information about wines and wine collections. Created in 2003 by Eric LeVine, a former Microsoft program manager, CellarTracker has grown to be one of the world's most comprehensive wine databases. CellarTracker is free to use and relies heavily on its users for data input, constantly increasing the number of tracked bottles as well as user tasting notes.

CellarTracker also has a donation option which gives access to a series of services through CellarTracker's cooperation with other online resources, such as Stephen Tanzer, Wine Market Journal and Jancis Robinson.

== History ==
CellarTracker was created in 2003 after creator Eric LeVine, then a programmer at Microsoft, had made the program for himself, tracking his wine. Some friends suggested he launch the concept online which he did in 2004. The CellarTracker concept proved popular and over the years it out-paced other similar resources, such as Cork'd, while increasing cooperating with other wine-related services. An early contributor was US wine critic Stephen Tanzer who offered his scores to donating members of CellarTracker. Other collaborations followed, the most notable being with Jancis Robinson.

In early 2010, Eric LeVine launched a sister site for CellarTracker, called GrapeStories. GrapeStories relied on the same database as CellarTracker, but was intended to be a more user-friendly approach to tracking wine and sharing wine experiences as well as providing a better interface. LeVine had been dissatisfied by the static interface in CellarTracker, and was trying to create a more dynamic and engaging interface with GrapeStories. In December 2010 however, he announced his decision to abandon the GrapesStories rename, and keep the Cellartracker name with the new interface.

As of January 2014, CellarTracker has more than 288,000 registered users with 30 million individual bottles, and nearly 3.8 million wine reviews from users.

== Concept ==
CellarTracker works by keeping track or "tracking" the user's wine. The user is supposed to search for the wines in his cellar on CellarTracker's database and then enter number of bottles and price (optional). If the wine does not already exist in the database, the user can create it himself, thus adding to the completeness of the CellarTracker database. When drinking a wine, the user marks the bottle as drunk and enters a tasting note (optional). The idea is that by having a large number of users generate tasting notes for other users to read, this helps guide the user in choosing the right wine to drink, buy etc. Thus, CellarTracker relies heavily on the users' input and willingness to add to the database.

== Partnerships ==
CellarTracker offers a multitude of services provided through cooperation with third parties.

This group of third parties varies over time.

Cellartracker divides these parties into "Paid Content" and "Free Content".

In 2023 there are 17 channels of Paid Content from various wine publications that integrate with Cellartracker. One subscribes to the channels of one's choice and that allows each publication's specific reports to be integrated in the Cellartracker website for those subscribers. Additionally, In 2023 there are 12 channels of Free Content.

For a current list of all channels, see: https://support.cellartracker.com/article/39-integrated-professional-reviews .

== Awards ==
On January 4, 2010, Eric LeVine, founder of CellarTracker.com, was named the "Wine Person of the Decade" by user voting on popular wine blog, Dr. Vino.com.
