= Asa Grover =

American politician (1819–1887)

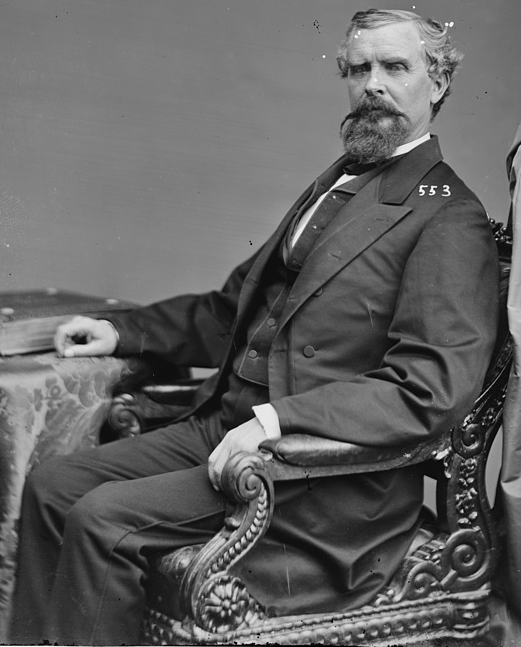

Member of the U.S. House of Representatives from Kentucky's 5th district
- In office March 4, 1867 – March 3, 1869
- Preceded by: Lovell Rousseau
- Succeeded by: Boyd Winchester

Member of the Kentucky Senate
- In office August 3, 1857 – August 7, 1865 Serving with John L. Irvan (1861–63)
- Preceded by: Overton P. Hogan
- Succeeded by: Evan M. Garriott
- Constituency: 29th district (1857–1861); 22nd district (1861–1865)

Personal details
- Born: February 18, 1819 Ontario County, New York, US
- Died: July 20, 1887 (aged 68) Georgetown, Kentucky, US
- Resting place: Georgetown Cemetery
- Party: Democratic
- Education: Centre College
- Profession: Lawyer

Asa Porter Grover (February 18, 1819 – July 20, 1887) was a United States representative from Kentucky. He was born near Phelps, New York where he attended the common schools before moving to Kentucky in 1837. He attended Centre College in Danville, Kentucky and taught school in Woodford and Franklin Counties. In addition, he studied law and was admitted to the bar in 1843 and commenced practice in Owenton, Kentucky.

Grover was a member of the Kentucky Senate 1857-1865 and a member of the Democratic State convention in 1863. He was elected as a Democrat to the Fortieth Congress (March 4, 1867 – March 3, 1869). Due to charges of disloyalty which were found to be unsustained, he was not seated until December 3, 1867. He never voted as a Member of Congress. After leaving Congress, he resumed the practice of law. He moved to Georgetown, Kentucky in 1881 and continued the practice of law until his death in that city on July 20, 1887. He was buried in Georgetown Cemetery.

U.S. House of Representatives
Preceded by Lovell Rousseau	Member of the U.S. House of Representatives from Kentucky's 5th congressional district March 4, 1867 – March 3, 1869	Succeeded by Boyd Winchester
