= John D. Washburn =

American diplomat

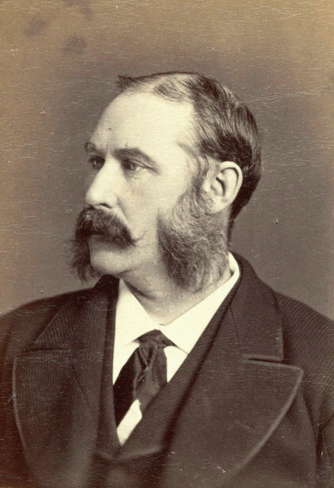
- John Washburn in 1876.
- Born: 27 March 1833 (unknown)
- Died: 4 April 1903 (aged 70); Worcester, Massachusetts, US
- Occupation: Diplomat

John Davis Washburn (March 27, 1833 – April 4, 1903) was an American diplomat who was the Minister Resident/Consul General to Switzerland.

Appointed on March 12, 1889, he presented his credentials on May 24, 1889. He was promoted to Envoy Extraordinary and Minister Plenipotentiary on July 30, 1890. On August 10, 1892, his mission was terminated. He graduated from Harvard College in 1853 with a BA and from Harvard Law School in 1856 with a LLB.
