= J. Richard Fredericks =

American diplomat

His Excellency J. Richard Fredericks

United States Ambassador to Switzerland and Liechtenstein
- In office October 29, 1999 – July 6, 2001
- President: Bill Clinton
- Preceded by: Madeleine Kunin
- Succeeded by: Mercer Reynolds

Personal details
- Born: J. Richard Fredericks; October 23, 1945 (age 81) Detroit, Michigan, U.S.
- Spouse: Stephanie Sorensen
- Children: 3
- Education: Georgetown University (BS); Columbia University (MBA)
- Occupation: Businessman
- Website: Department of State website

J. Richard Fredericks (born October 23, 1945) was the United States Ambassador to Switzerland and Liechtenstein from October 29, 1999 to July 6, 2001. He was appointed by President Bill Clinton.

== Life ==
Fredericks was born 1945 in Detroit, Michigan. He is of partial Swiss ancestry who emigrated from Röschenz to the United States in 1848. He received a B.S. in Business Administration from Georgetown University and an M.B.A. from Columbia University.

Fredericks is a founding partner of Main Management, LLC. On December 3, 2010, Speaker Nancy Pelosi appointed Fredericks as a member of the trust fund board of the Library of Congress.

Diplomatic posts
Preceded by Madeleine M. Kunin	United States Ambassador to Switzerland and Liechtenstein; 1999–2001	Succeeded by Mercer Reynolds
