= List of ambassadors of the United States to Switzerland and Liechtenstein =

Ambassador of the United States to Switzerland and Liechtenstein
- Seal of the United States Department of State

- Flag of a United States ambassador

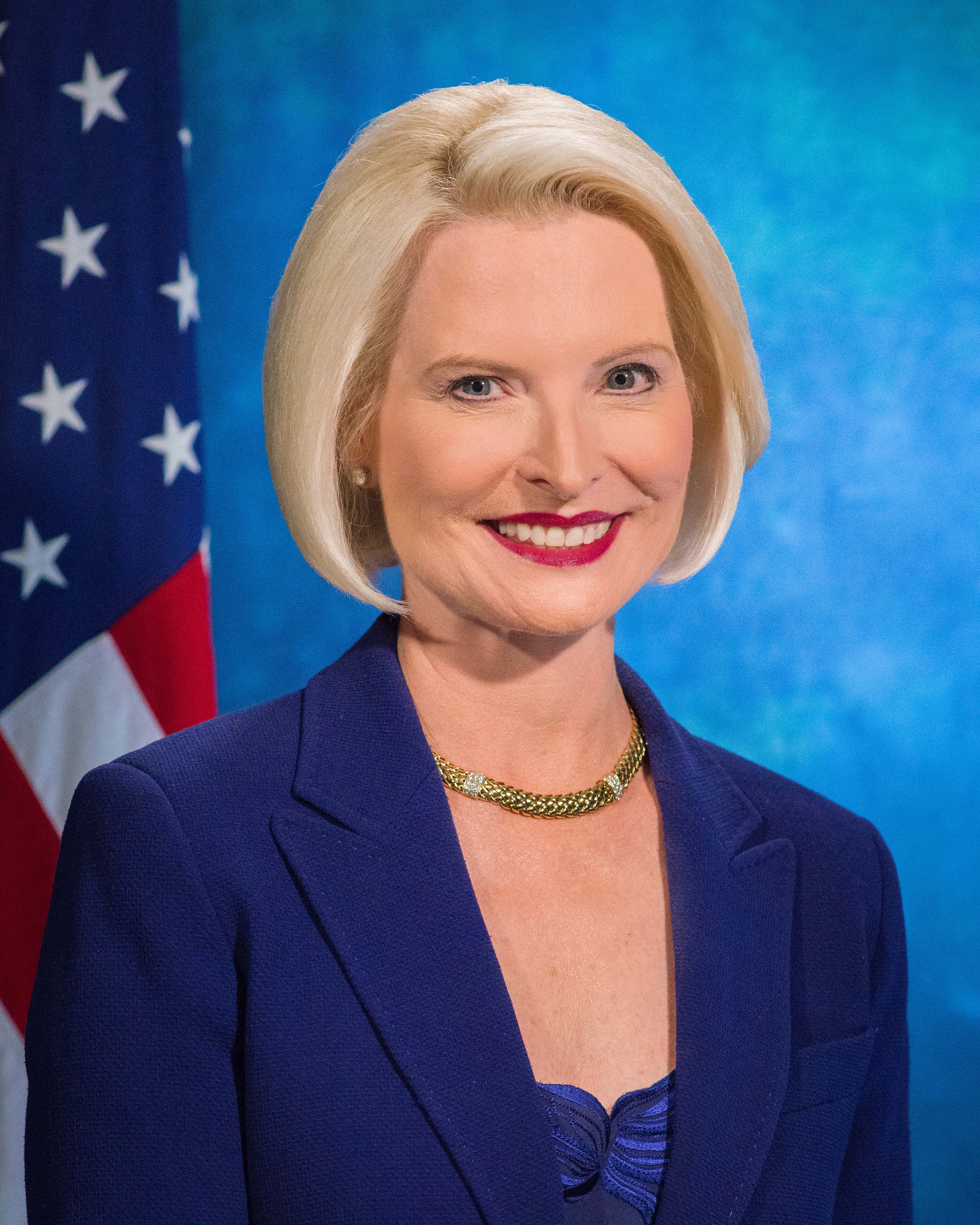
- Incumbent; Callista Gingrich since October 23, 2025
- Nominator: The president of the United States
- Appointer: The president; with Senate advice and consent
- Inaugural holder: Theodore Sedgwick Fay as Minister Resident
- Formation: March 16, 1853
- Website: U.S. Embassy - Bern

This is a list of United States ambassadors to the Swiss Confederation and the Principality of Liechtenstein.

== History ==
Since 1997, the U.S. ambassador to Switzerland has also been accredited to the Principality of Liechtenstein. Appointed on February 10, 1997, Ambassador Madeleine M. Kunin served as the first U.S. Ambassador to Liechtenstein. She presented her credentials to Liechtenstein on March 14, 1997, which marked the beginning of the U.S.' diplomatic relations with the country.

Although the U.S. executed its first treaty with Liechtenstein in 1926, at the time, and until 1997, Liechtenstein was represented diplomatically by Switzerland.

Before 1997 it was understood that the rights of a U.S.–Swiss agreement also extended to citizens of Liechtenstein because it had yielded control of its foreign affairs to Switzerland. At the end of the 20th century, however, it "began pursuing independent membership in international organizations".

== Political appointees ==
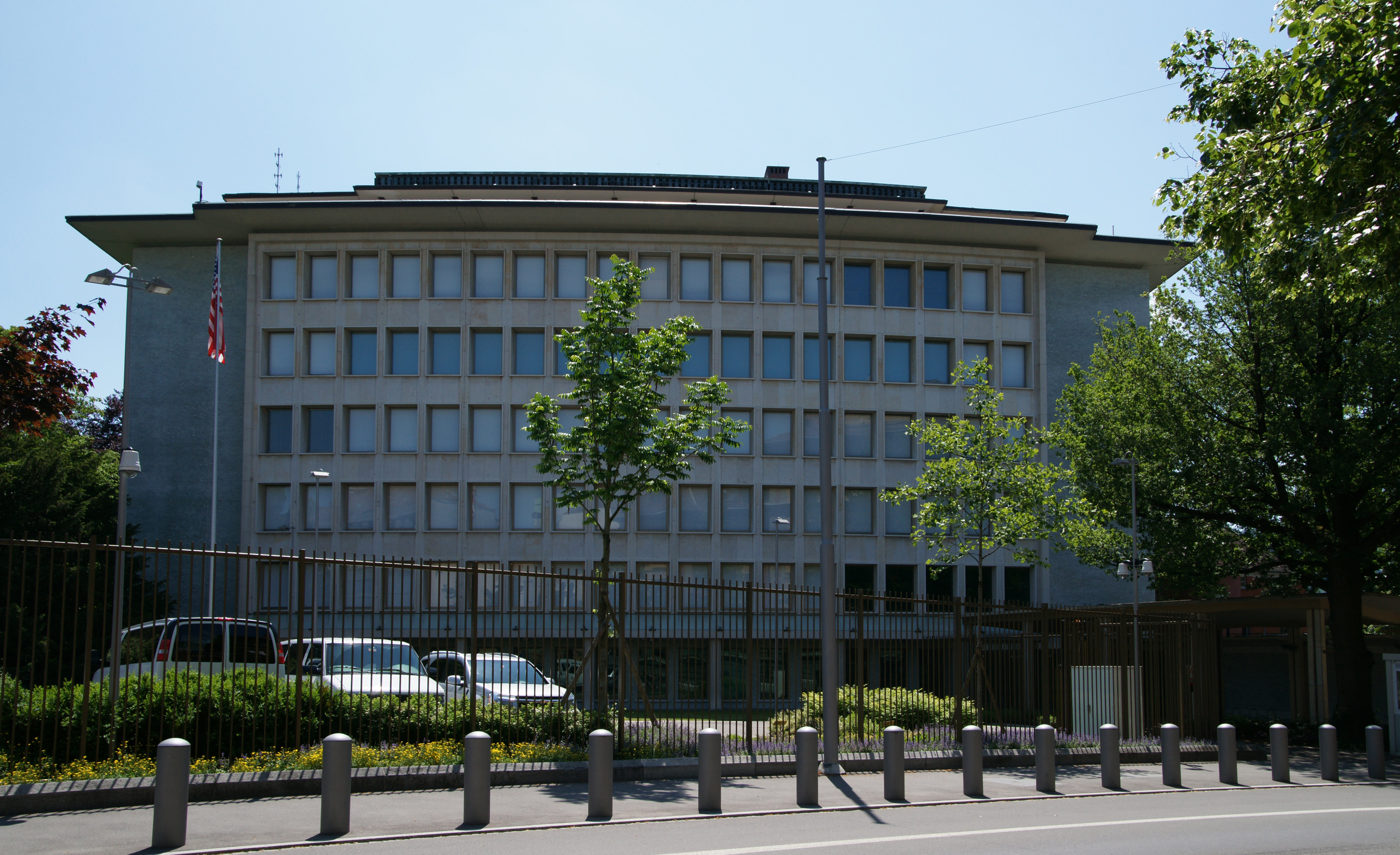
The Embassy of the United States on Sulgeneckstrasse 193 in Bern, Switzerland (2010).

U.S. ambassadors are nominated by the president and confirmed by the U.S. Senate. The position of ambassador to Switzerland is generally held by a political appointee rather than a career Foreign Service Officer (FSO). According to the American Foreign Service Association, only two career FSOs since 1960 have been appointed to the Swiss and Liechtenstein ambassadorship (both times were in the 1970s), whereas the remaining twenty ambassadors were political appointees, typically those known as "campaign bundlers" who raise large sums of money for presidential campaigns.

== List of ambassadors ==
Name	Background	Title	Appointment	Presentation of credentials	Termination of mission
Theodore Sedgwick Fay	Foreign Service officer	Minister Resident	March 16, 1853	June 29, 1853	Presented recall, July 1, 1861
George G. Fogg	Non-career appointee	Minister Resident	March 28, 1861	July 1, 1861	Presented recall, October 16, 1865
George Harrington	Non-career appointee	Minister Resident	July 7, 1865	October 16, 1865	Presented recall, July 20, 1869
Horace Rublee	Non-career appointee	Minister Resident	April 20, 1869	July 20, 1869	Presented recall, September 7, 1876
Horace Rublee	Non-career appointee	Chargé d'affaires	August 15, 1876	September 7, 1876	Left post October 1, 1876
George Schneider	Non-career appointee	Chargé d'affaires	May 1, 1877		
Nicholas Fish II	Foreign Service officer	Chargé d'affaires	Jun 20, 1877	August 7, 1877	Presented recall, August 24, 1881
Michael J. Cramer	Non-career appointee	Chargé d'affaires	May 11, 1881	Aug 25, 1881	Promoted to Minister Resident/Consul General
Michael J. Cramer	Non-career appointee	Minister Resident/Consul General	Jul 13, 1882	Aug 14, 1882	Presented recall, Jul 9, 1885
Boyd Winchester	Non-career appointee	Minister Resident/Consul General	May 7, 1885	Jul 9, 1885	Presented recall, May 24, 1889
John D. Washburn	Non-career appointee	Minister Resident/Consul General	Mar 12, 1889	May 24, 1889	Promoted to Envoy Extraordinary and Minister Plenipotentiary
John D. Washburn	Non-career appointee	Envoy Extraordinary and Minister Plenipotentiary	Jul 30, 1890	Dec 13, 1890	Left post Aug 10, 1892
Person Colby Cheney	Non-career appointee	Envoy Extraordinary and Minister Plenipotentiary	Dec 13, 1892	Jan 26, 1893	Presented recall, Jan 29, 1893
James Broadhead	Non-career appointee	Envoy Extraordinary and Minister Plenipotentiary	Apr 7, 1893	Jul 5, 1893	Appointment terminated, Nov 1, 1895
John L. Peak	Non-career appointee	Envoy Extraordinary and Minister Plenipotentiary	Nov 18, 1895	Feb 15, 1896	Presented recall, Aug 9, 1897
John George Alexander Leishman	Non-career appointee	Envoy Extraordinary and Minister Plenipotentiary	Jun 9, 1897	Aug 9, 1897	Presented recall, Feb 20, 1901
Arthur Sherburne Hardy	Non-career appointee	Envoy Extraordinary and Minister Plenipotentiary	Dec 20, 1900	Apr 3, 1901	Presented recall, Jan 29, 1903
Charles Page Bryan	Foreign Service officer	Envoy Extraordinary and Minister Plenipotentiary	Sep 26, 1902		
Charles Page Bryan	Foreign Service officer	Envoy Extraordinary and Minister Plenipotentiary	Dec 8, 1902		
David Jayne Hill	Foreign Service officer	Envoy Extraordinary and Minister Plenipotentiary	Jan 7, 1903	Feb 24, 1903	Presented recall, Jul 1, 1905
Brutus J. Clay II	Foreign Service officer	Envoy Extraordinary and Minister Plenipotentiary	Mar 8, 1905	Jul 1, 1905	Superseded, Mar 1, 1910
Laurits S. Swenson	Foreign Service officer	Envoy Extraordinary and Minister Plenipotentiary	Dec 21, 1909	Mar 1, 1910	Presented recall, May 15, 1911
Henry Sherman Boutell	Non-career appointee	Envoy Extraordinary and Minister Plenipotentiary	Apr 24, 1911	May 23, 1911	Presented recall, Jul 31, 1913
Pleasant A. Stovall	Non-career appointee	Envoy Extraordinary and Minister Plenipotentiary	Jun 21, 1913	Aug 23, 1913	Left post Dec 14, 1919
Hampson Gary	Non-career appointee	Envoy Extraordinary and Minister Plenipotentiary	Apr 7, 1920	Jun 3, 1920	Left post about Mar 4, 1921
Joseph Grew	Foreign Service Officer	Envoy Extraordinary and Minister Plenipotentiary	Sep 24, 1921	Nov 1, 1921	Left post Mar 22, 1924
Hugh S. Gibson	Foreign Service Officer	Envoy Extraordinary and Minister Plenipotentiary	Mar 18, 1924	May 19, 1924	Presented recall, Apr 29, 1927
Hugh R. Wilson	Foreign Service Officer	Envoy Extraordinary and Minister Plenipotentiary	Feb 26, 1927	Jun 11, 1927	Left post Jul 8, 1937
Leland B. Harrison	Foreign Service Officer	Envoy Extraordinary and Minister Plenipotentiary	Jul 13, 1937	Sep 10, 1937	Left post Oct 14, 1947
John Carter Vincent	Foreign Service Officer	Envoy Extraordinary and Minister Plenipotentiary	Jul 24, 1947	Oct 21, 1947	Left post Jun 9, 1951
Richard Cunningham Patterson Jr.	Non-career appointee	Envoy Extraordinary and Minister Plenipotentiary	Mar 22, 1951	Jun 27, 1951	Left post Apr 14, 1953
Frances E. Willis	Foreign Service officer	Ambassador Extraordinary and Plenipotentiary	Jul 20, 1953	Oct 9, 1953	Left post May 5, 1957
Henry J. Taylor	Non-career appointee	Ambassador Extraordinary and Plenipotentiary	May 9, 1957	May 31, 1957	Left post Feb 28, 1961
Robert M. McKinney	Non-career appointee	Ambassador Extraordinary and Plenipotentiary	Jun 22, 1961	Jul 25, 1961	Left post Sep 8, 1963
W. True Davis Jr.	Non-career appointee	Ambassador Extraordinary and Plenipotentiary	Oct 2, 1963	Nov 29, 1963	Left post Sep 3, 1965
John S. Hayes	Non-career appointee	Ambassador Extraordinary and Plenipotentiary	Sep 19, 1966	Nov 18, 1966	Left post May 20, 1969
Shelby Cullom Davis	Non-career appointee	Ambassador Extraordinary and Plenipotentiary	May 13, 1969	Jul 17, 1969	Left post Apr 10, 1975
Peter H. Dominick	Non-career appointee	Ambassador Extraordinary and Plenipotentiary	Feb 20, 1975	Apr 25, 1975	Left post Jul 10, 1975
Nathaniel Davis	Foreign Service officer	Ambassador Extraordinary and Plenipotentiary	Nov 20, 1975	Jan 9, 1976	Left post Jul 31, 1977
Marvin L. Warner	Non-career appointee	Ambassador Extraordinary and Plenipotentiary	Jul 11, 1977	Sep 13, 1977	Left post Jul 10, 1979
Richard David Vine	Foreign Service officer	Ambassador Extraordinary and Plenipotentiary	Sep 20, 1979	Oct 19, 1979	Left post Sep 1, 1981
Faith Whittlesey	Non-career appointee	Ambassador Extraordinary and Plenipotentiary	Sep 28, 1981	Oct 23, 1981	Left post Feb 28, 1983
John Davis Lodge	Non-career appointee	Ambassador Extraordinary and Plenipotentiary	Mar 18, 1983	May 19, 1983	Left post Apr 30, 1985
Faith Whittlesey	Non-career appointee	Ambassador Extraordinary and Plenipotentiary	Apr 4, 1985	May 31, 1985	Left post Jun 14, 1988
Philip D. Winn	Non-career appointee	Ambassador Extraordinary and Plenipotentiary	Jul 11, 1988	Aug 19, 1988	Left post Aug 5, 1989
Joseph Bernard Gildenhorn	Non-career appointee	Ambassador Extraordinary and Plenipotentiary	Aug 3, 1989	Aug 23, 1989	Left post Mar 1, 1993
The following officers served as Chargés d'affaires ad interim (1993–94): John E. Hall (Mar–Aug 1993), Brian M. Flora (Aug–Dec 1993), Michael C. Polt (Dec 1993–Mar 1994), and Jeffrey R. Cellars (July 22, 2013 - June 2, 2014)
M. Larry Lawrence	Non-career appointee	Ambassador Extraordinary and Plenipotentiary	Feb 9, 1994	Mar 21, 1994	Died at post Jan 9, 1996
Madeleine M. Kunin	Non-career appointee	Ambassador Extraordinary and Plenipotentiary	Aug 8, 1996	Aug 19, 1996	Left post Aug 16, 1999
J. Richard Fredericks	Non-career appointee	Ambassador Extraordinary and Plenipotentiary	Oct 29, 1999	Dec 2, 1999	Left post Jul 6, 2001
Mercer Reynolds	Non-career appointee	Ambassador Extraordinary and Plenipotentiary	Aug 3, 2001	Sep 11, 2001	Left post Mar 29, 2003
Pamela Willeford	Non-career appointee	Ambassador Extraordinary and Plenipotentiary	Oct 7, 2003	Nov 25, 2003	Left post May 6, 2006
Peter R. Coneway	Non-career appointee	Ambassador Extraordinary and Plenipotentiary	Sept 6, 2006	Oct 19, 2006	Dec 7, 2008
Donald S. Beyer Jr.	Non-career appointee	Ambassador Extraordinary and Plenipotentiary	August 5, 2009	August 15, 2009	May 29, 2013
Suzan G. LeVine	Non-career appointee	Ambassador Extraordinary and Plenipotentiary	June 2, 2014	July 1, 2014	January 20, 2017
Ed McMullen	Non-career appointee	Ambassador Extraordinary and Plenipotentiary	November 2, 2017	November 21, 2017	January 17, 2021
Scott Miller	Non-career appointee	Ambassador Extraordinary and Plenipotentiary	December 18, 2021	January 11, 2022	January 20, 2025
Bradford Bell	Foreign Service officer	Chargé d'affaires	January 20, 2025		October 20, 2025
Callista Gingrich	Non-career appointee	Ambassador Extraordinary and Plenipotentiary	September 18, 2025	October 23, 2025	Incumbent

=== Recess appointments ===
The following were commissioned during a Senate recess and thus were recommissioned after their post-recess confirmations.

- George Harrington (confirmed January 22, 1866)
- Nicholas Fish II (confirmed October 30, 1877)
- Boyd Winchester (confirmed January 21, 1866)
- John L. Peak (confirmed December 21, 1866)
- Charles Page Bryan (twice commissioned during recess but did not serve under either)

=== Other cases ===
Theodore Sedgwick Fay was nominated to be Envoy Extraordinary and Minister Plenipotentiary on February 25, 1856, but his nomination was withdrawn before the Senate acted on it. George Schneider was commissioned during a Senate recess and he took the oath of office but did not proceed to post.

== See also ==
- Ambassadors of the United States
- Embassy of the United States, Bern
- Foreign relations of Liechtenstein
- Foreign relations of Switzerland
- Liechtenstein–United States relations
- Swiss Ambassador to the United States
- Switzerland–United States relations

== Bibliography ==
- United States Department of State: Background notes on Switzerland
- United States Department of State: Background notes on Liechtenstein
