= Foreign relations of Liechtenstein =

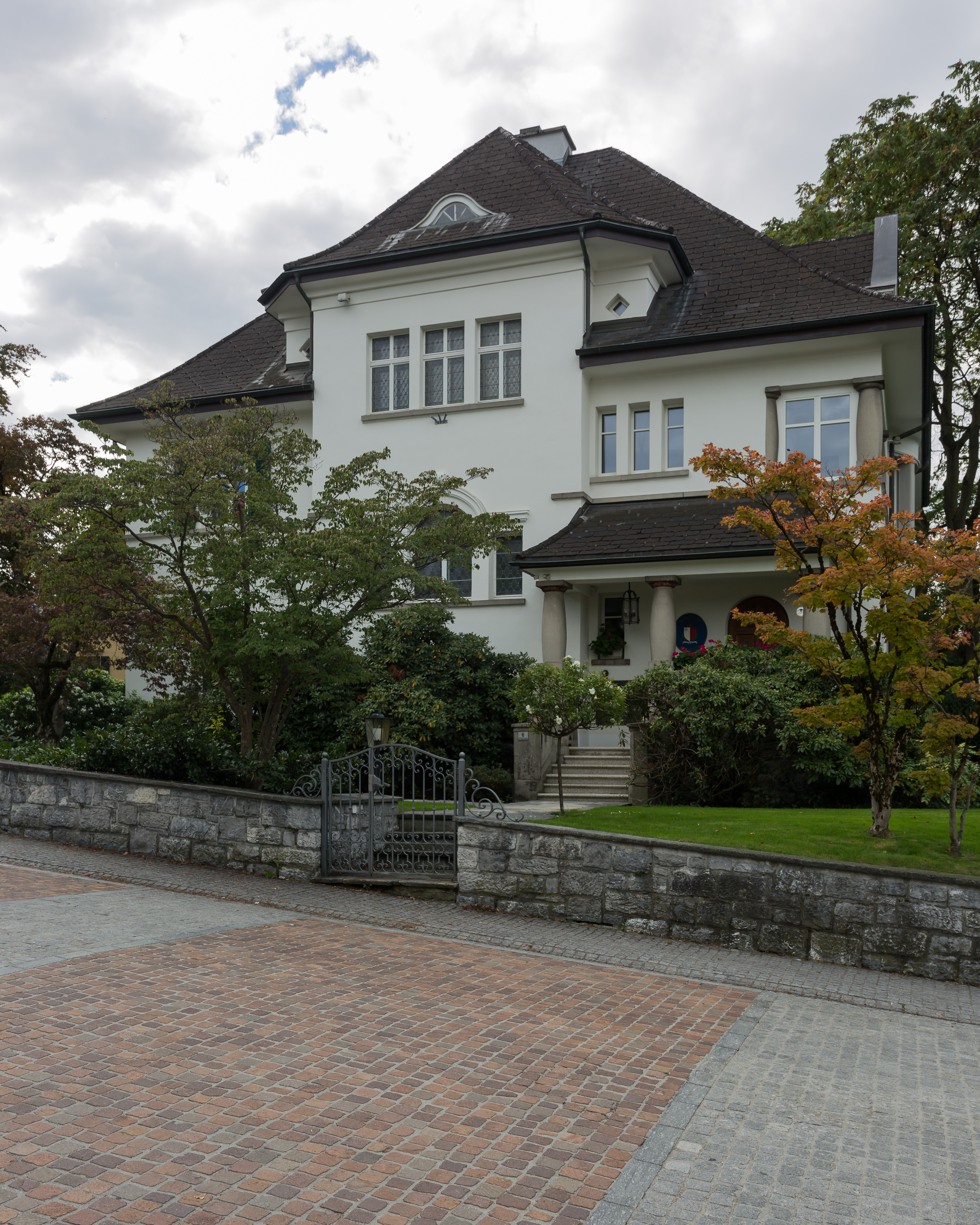
Consulate of Malta in Schaan

Liechtenstein's foreign economic policy has been dominated by its customs union with Switzerland (and with Austria-Hungary until World War I). This union also led to its independent membership in the European Free Trade Association (EFTA) in 1991. Unlike Switzerland however (where citizens rejected membership in a referendum), Liechtenstein is part of the European Economic Area.

Liechtenstein was admitted to the United Nations in 1990. It is not a member of most specialized agencies of the United Nations, with the exceptions of the International Telecommunication Union, the Universal Postal Union and the World Intellectual Property Organization.

Liechtenstein has resorted two times to international dispute settlement by the International Court of Justice, in the Nottebohm (Liechtenstein v. Guatemala) case against Guatemala in the 1950s and in a case concerning art property of the Liechtenstein family against Germany in 2005. It lost in both cases.

Liechtenstein maintains resident embassies in Austria, Belgium, Germany, the Holy See, Switzerland and the United States, along with a number of missions to international organisations. Under a 1919 agreement between Liechtenstein and Switzerland, ambassadors of Switzerland are authorised to represent Liechtenstein in countries and in diplomatic situations unless Liechtenstein opts to send its own ambassador. As of 2024, Liechtenstein has diplomatic relations with 133 UN countries.

== Relations with individual countries ==
=== International dispute with Czechoslovakia, the Czech Republic and Slovakia ===
The country has an international dispute with the Czech Republic and Slovakia concerning the estates of its princely family in those countries. After World War II, Czechoslovakia, as it then was, acting to seize what it considered to be German possessions, expropriated the entirety of the Liechtenstein dynasty's hereditary lands and possessions in the Czech regions of Bohemia, Moravia, and Silesia. The expropriations (which were the subject of an unsuccessful court case brought by Liechtenstein in the German courts and the International Court of Justice) included over 1,600 km^{2} (620 sq mi) (which is ten times the size of Liechtenstein) of agricultural and forest land mostly in Moravia, also including several family castles and palaces. An offer from the Czech Republic to return the palaces and castles (without the surrounding land) was rejected by Liechtenstein.

Liechtenstein recognised and established diplomatic relations with the Czech Republic on 13 July 2009 and with Slovakia on 9 December 2009. Liechtenstein's ruling prince, Hans-Adam II, has announced that the principality will take no further legal action to recover the appropriated assets.

In February 2020, the Czech Constitutional court in Brno rejected a case made by Liechtenstein to get the Czech government to change their classification of the Liechtenstein dynasty as German under the Beneš Decrees. On 19 August 2020, an inter-state application under the European Convention on Human Rights was made by Liechtenstein to the European Court of Human Rights against the Czech Republic.

== Diplomatic relations ==
List of countries with which Liechtenstein maintains diplomatic relations:

#	Country	Date
1	Switzerland	March 1919
2	China	14 September 1950
3	Germany	6 May 1952
4	Austria	29 May 1981
—	Holy See	28 August 1985
5	Estonia	4 September 1991
6	Sweden	24 October 1991
7	Netherlands	20 November 1991
8	Norway	9 January 1992
9	Spain	9 January 1992
10	Azerbaijan	21 January 1992
11	Slovenia	31 January 1992
12	Croatia	4 February 1992
13	Italy	6 February 1992
14	Portugal	6 February 1992
15	Ukraine	6 February 1992
16	United Kingdom	6 February 1992
17	Belarus	10 February 1992
18	Belgium	13 March 1992
19	Denmark	13 March 1992
20	Israel	13 March 1992
21	Bosnia and Herzegovina	5 May 1992
22	Georgia	10 June 1992
23	Poland	25 June 1992
24	Finland	26 June 1992
25	Iceland	26 June 1992
26	Luxembourg	26 June 1992
27	Turkey	2 October 1992
28	France	8 October 1992
29	Ireland	13 January 1993
30	South Korea	2 March 1993
31	India	6 April 1993
32	Albania	23 April 1993
33	Hungary	14 June 1993
34	Uruguay	24 September 1993
35	Brazil	11 January 1994
36	Argentina	12 January 1994
37	South Africa	12 January 1994
38	Russia	30 January 1994
39	North Macedonia	31 January 1994
40	Bulgaria	25 April 1994
41	Mexico	1 July 1994
42	Greece	6 July 1994
—	Sovereign Military Order of Malta	7 November 1994
43	Andorra	1 September 1995
44	Philippines	24 November 1995
45	Pakistan	4 December 1995
46	Monaco	16 February 1996
47	Canada	12 March 1996
48	Japan	12 June 1996
49	Peru	5 July 1996
50	Chile	2 October 1996
51	Cyprus	2 October 1996
52	Latvia	3 December 1996
53	United States	10 February 1997
54	Australia	14 March 1997
55	Cuba	11 June 1997
56	Thailand	14 August 1997
57	Ecuador	17 October 1997
58	Venezuela	17 October 1997
59	Romania	12 December 1997
60	Mongolia	18 March 1998
61	Iran	14 August 1998
62	Indonesia	14 August 1998
63	Kyrgyzstan	16 September 1999
64	Costa Rica	12 January 2000
65	Lebanon	9 June 2000
66	Morocco	9 June 2000
67	Lithuania	27 March 2001
68	North Korea	2 May 2001
69	Moldova	14 August 2001
70	Colombia	24 October 2001
71	Serbia	4 April 2003
72	Malta	12 May 2003
73	Laos	8 January 2004
74	Malaysia	July 2004
75	Bahrain	1 April 2005
76	Egypt	17 October 2005
77	Algeria	21 October 2005
78	Kazakhstan	31 January 2007
79	Montenegro	26 March 2007
80	Tajikistan	28 January 2008
81	Armenia	7 May 2008
82	Kuwait	16 June 2008
83	Vietnam	2 July 2008
84	Niger	17 December 2008
85	Saudi Arabia	29 April 2009
86	United Arab Emirates	22 October 2009
87	Czech Republic	8 September 2009
88	Slovakia	9 December 2009
89	Singapore	19 April 2010
90	Saint Kitts and Nevis	2010
91	Maldives	21 January 2011
92	Paraguay	6 April 2011
93	Cambodia	8 June 2011
94	San Marino	21 October 2011
95	Nigeria	28 October 2011
96	Brunei	15 November 2011
97	Panama	3 January 2012
98	Tuvalu	1 June 2012
—	Kosovo	28 June 2012
99	Solomon Islands	2012
100	Nicaragua	23 February 2013
101	New Zealand	30 October 2013
102	Trinidad and Tobago	31 January 2014
103	Ivory Coast	14 March 2014
104	Qatar	26 June 2014
105	Fiji	30 July 2014
106	Guinea	11 December 2015
107	Guatemala	22 December 2015
108	El Salvador	2015
109	Rwanda	10 November 2016
110	Mauritius	12 May 2017
111	Sudan	24 May 2017
112	Tunisia	20 October 2017
113	Nepal	24 November 2017
114	Antigua and Barbuda	25 September 2018
115	Afghanistan	26 October 2018
116	Equatorial Guinea	2018
117	Benin	26 June 2019
118	Chad	26 June 2019
119	Marshall Islands	24 September 2019
120	Dominican Republic	26 September 2019
121	Ghana	19 December 2019
122	Honduras	2020
123	Sri Lanka	5 March 2021
124	Angola	23 June 2021
125	Namibia	22 September 2021
126	Bolivia	17 November 2021
127	Senegal	2021
128	Kenya	29 April 2022
129	Jamaica	18 September 2023
130	Saint Lucia	20 September 2023
131	Oman	4 March 2024
132	Uzbekistan	5 March 2024
133	Turkmenistan	1 November 2024
134	Cape Verde	2024
135	Jordan	2024
136	Burundi	12 August 2025
137	Zambia	25 September 2025
138	Bahamas	1 May 2026
139	Bhutan	2 June 2026
140	Lesotho	1 July 2026
141	Botswana	11 August 2026
142	Saint Vincent and the Grenadines	Unknown

== Bilateral relations ==
=== Americas ===
Country	Formal relations began on	Notes
Mexico	1 July 1994	Honorary Consulate of Mexico in Liechtenstein: On 13 December 2023, Liechtenstein foreign minister Dominique Hasler met her Mexican counterpart Alicia Bárcena Ibarra in the first official Liechtenstein visit to Mexico.
United States	10 February 1997	See Liechtenstein–United States relations

=== Asia ===
Country	Formal relations began on	Notes
Hong Kong		See Hong Kong–Liechtenstein relations: Signed a tax treaty in 2010.; Have a free trade agreement.
India	6 April 1993	See India–Liechtenstein relations
Japan	12 June 1996	See Japan–Liechtenstein relations: The two countries signed a tax treaty in 2012.
South Korea	2 March 1993	Both countries established diplomatic relations on March 02, 1993.: The two states signed a FTA on 15 December 2005.
Turkey	2 October 1992	Turkey established diplomatic relations with Liechtenstein only in 1992 because Switzerland had taken responsibility for Liechtenstein's diplomatic relations until early 1990s.; Turkey is accredited to Liechtenstein from its embassy in Bern, Switzerland and maintains an honorary consulate in Vaduz.

=== Europe ===
Country	Formal relations began on	Notes
Czech Republic	8 September 2009	See Czech Republic–Liechtenstein relations: The two countries have a long-running dispute regarding the seizure of Liechtenstein assets and properties by the Beneš decrees in 1945.; In 2003, the Czech Republic refused to recognize Liechtenstein as having become a sovereign state in 1806.; The two countries signed a correspondence treaty in 2009.
France	8 October 1992	See France–Liechtenstein relations: The two countries signed a tax information exchange agreement.
Germany	6 May 1952	See Germany–Liechtenstein relations
Russia	30 January 1994	See Liechtenstein–Russia relations
Switzerland	March 1919	See Liechtenstein–Switzerland relations: The two countries have been in a customs union since 1924.; Liechtenstein has an embassy in Bern.; Switzerland is accredited to Liechtenstein from its Federal Department of Foreign Affairs in Bern and maintains an honorary consulate in Vaduz.
Ukraine	6 February 1992	See Liechtenstein–Ukraine relations: The two countries have a free trade agreement.
United Kingdom	6 February 1992	See Liechtenstein–United Kingdom relations Liechtensteiner Prime Minister Daniel Risch with British Prime Minister Keir Starmer at a European Political Community summit on Blenheim Palace, July 2025. The UK established diplomatic relations with the United Kingdom on 6 February 1992.: The United Kingdom is not accredited to Liechtenstein through an embassy; the UK develops relations through its embassy in Bern, Switzerland.; Both countries share common membership of the Council of Europe, European Court of Human Rights, the International Criminal Court, OSCE, the United Nations, and the World Trade Organization. Bilaterally the two countries have a Double Taxation Convention, a Free Trade Agreement, a Separation Agreement, a Social Security Coordination Convention, and a Trade Agreement.

== Membership in international organizations ==
Liechtenstein is a member of the following international organizations:

- United Nations
- Council of Europe
- European Bank for Reconstruction and Development
- United Nations Economic Commission for Europe
- European Economic Area
- European Free Trade Association
- International Atomic Energy Agency
- International Criminal Court
- International Red Cross and Red Crescent Movement
- International Federation of Red Cross and Red Crescent Societies
- Intelsat
- Interpol
- International Olympic Committee
- International Telecommunication Union
- Organisation for the Prohibition of Chemical Weapons
- Organization for Security and Co-operation in Europe
- Permanent Court of Arbitration
- United Nations Conference on Trade and Development
- Universal Postal Union
- World Confederation of Labour
- World Intellectual Property Organization
- World Trade Organization

Liechtenstein was never a member of the League of Nations. Its application to join that international organisation was refused in 1920 due to its small size. While included in the Schengen Area, Liechtenstein is not a member of the European Union.

== See also ==
- Liechtenstein–European Union relations
- List of ambassadors to Liechtenstein
- List of diplomatic missions in Liechtenstein
- List of diplomatic missions of Liechtenstein
- Visa requirements for Liechtenstein citizens
