= List of ambassadors to Liechtenstein =

This is a list of ambassadors to Liechtenstein. Note that some ambassadors are responsible for more than one country while others are directly accredited to Vaduz.

== Ambassadors to Vaduz ==
List of ambassadors to Liechtenstein by country and date of presentation of credentials:

First ambassador accredited from each country

Country	Ambassador	Presentation of credentials	Ref
Austria	Karl Fischer	29 May 1981	
Austria	Dietrich Bukowski	20 June 1984	
Austria	Johannes Kyrie	22 March 1991	
Sweden	Viktor Ewerlöf	24 October 1991	
Netherlands	Arie Bernardus Hoytink	20 November 1991	
Germany	Werner Graf von der Schulenburg	9 January 1992	
Norway	Roald Knoph	9 January 1992	
Spain	Joaquin Martinez-Correcher y Gil	9 January 1992	
Italy	Onofrio Solari Bozzi	6 February 1992	
Portugal	Octávio Neto Valério	6 February 1992	
United Kingdom	Christopher Long	6 February 1992	
Belgium	Roland Burny	13 March 1992	
Denmark	Alf Jönsson	13 March 1992	
Israel	Raphaël Gvir	13 March 1992	
Italy	Franco Ferretti	26 June 1992	
Iceland	Hjálmar W. Hannesson	26 June 1992	
Luxembourg	Paul Peters	26 June 1992	
Poland	Marek Latynski	26 June 1992	
United Kingdom	David Beattie	26 June 1992	
Finland	Henry Söderholm	8 October 1992	
France	François Plaisant	8 October 1992	
Ireland	Christopher P. Fogarty	13 January 1993	
Spain	Federico Garayalde Emparan	13 January 1993	
France	Bernard Garcia	6 April 1993	
India	Madhav Keshav Mangalmurti	6 April 1993	
Portugal	Francisco António Borges Graínha do Vale	6 April 1993	
Holy See	Karl-Josef Rauber	19 May 1993	
Hungary	László Ódor	14 June 1993	
South Korea	Dae Wang Kang	14 June 1993	
Turkey	Kaya Toperi	14 June 1993	
Belgium	Marcel Houllez	11 January 1994	
Brazil	José Olympio Rache de Almeida	11 January 1994	
Croatia	Zdenko Skrabalo	11 January 1994	
Sweden	Jan Per Gösta Martenson	11 January 1994	
Argentina	Susana Ruiz Cerutti	13 January 1994	
South Africa	André Jacquet	13 January 1994	
Albania	Gazmend Besim Turdiu	25 April 1994	
Bulgaria	Elena Petkova Kirtcheva	25 April 1994	
Netherlands	Willem Sinnighe Damsté	25 April 1994	
Uruguay	Jorgé Talice	25 April 1994	
Greece	Emmanuel Ghikas	6 July 1994	
Denmark	Jan Marcussen	19 September 1994	
Germany	Eberhard Heyken	19 September 1994	
India	Kizhakke Pisharath Balakrishnan	19 September 1994	
Ireland	Gearóid Ó Clérigh	7 November 1994	
Sovereign Military Order of Malta	Gioacchino Malfatti di Montetretto	7 November 1994	
Mexico	Luis de Pablo Serna	7 November 1994	
Hungary	Pàl Gresznàryk	12 January 1995	
Norway	Jan G. Jolle	9 March 1995	
Russia	Andrej L. Stepanow	9 March 1995	
Turkey	Riza Türmen	9 March 1995	
Iceland	Hannes Hafstein	3 April 1995	
Brazil	Carlos Eduardo de Affonseca Alves de Souza	5 July 1995	
Mexico	Ezequiel Padilla Couttolenc	5 July 1995	
South Africa	Pieter Roelof Dietrichsen	5 July 1995	
South Korea	Hay Son Kim	5 July 1995	
Luxembourg	Jacques Reuter	23 November 1995	
North Macedonia	Srgjan Kerim	23 November 1995	
Philippines	Thomas T. Syquia	23 November 1995	
Poland	Marek Jedrys	23 November 1995	
Belgium	Hugo Callebaut	4 December 1995	
Israel	Gabriel Padon	4 December 1995	
Pakistan	Zia Ispahani	4 December 1995	
Italy	Arduino Fornara	14 February 1996	
Canada	Réjean Frenette	20 May 1996	
Germany	Lothar Wittmann	20 May 1996	
Ireland	Bernard Davenport	20 May 1996	
Monaco	Bernard Fautrier	20 May 1996	
Sweden	Folke Löfgren	20 May 1996	
Croatia	Petar Sarcevic	5 July 1996	
Peru	César Castillo Ramírez	5 July 1996	
Chile	Benjamin Concha Gazmuri	2 October 1996	
Cyprus	Petros Michaelides	2 October 1996	
Greece	Christodoulos Tsalikis	2 October 1996	
Netherlands	Thomas M. Kasteel	2 October 1996	
Japan	Mitsuhei Murata	13 November 1996	
South Africa	Ruth Segomotsi Mompati	13 November 1996	
Australia	Max William Hughes	14 March 1997	
Finland	Olli Mennander	14 March 1997	
France	André Gadaud	14 March 1997	
Latvia	Martins Virsis	14 March 1997	
Iceland	Gunnar Snorri Gunnarsson	14 March 1997	
United States	Madeleine May Kunin	14 March 1997	
Portugal	Pedro Paulo de Moraes Alves Machado	29 May 1997	
United Kingdom	Christopher Hulse	29 May 1997	
Norway	Bengt O. Johansen	14 August 1997	
Thailand	Don Pramudwinai	14 August 1997	
Ecuador	Edwin Johnson	17 October 1997	
Holy See	Oriano Quilici	17 October 1997	
Venezuela	Alberto José Guinand Baldó	17 October 1997	
Bulgaria	Léa Pépo Cohen	22 December 1997	
Israel	Yitzhak Mayer	22 December 1997	
Romania	Radu Boroianu	9 April 1998	
Chile	Hugo Miranda Ramirez	14 August 1998	
Cuba	Serafin Gil Rodriguez Valdes	14 August 1998	
Iran	Kia Tabatabaee	14 August 1998	
Indonesia	Tati Sumiyati Darsoyo	14 August 1998	
Mexico	Manuel Enrique Loaeza y Tovar Seiner	14 August 1998	
Albania	Vladimir Thanati	11 November 1998	
Brazil	Roberto Soares-de-Oliveira	11 November 1998	
Canada	John J. Noble	11 November 1998	
South Korea	Soon-tae-Kwon	11 November 1998	
Argentina	Jorge A. Vazquez	11 December 1998	
Germany	Klaus Bald	11 December 1998	
Turkey	Erdal Tümer	11 December 1998	
Ukraine	Nina Kovalska	11 December 1998	
Australia	Paul Thomas O'Sullivan	28 June 1999	
Holy See	Pier Giacomo De Nicolò	28 June 1999	
Hungary	Pál Schmitt	28 June 1999	
Thailand	Ronarong Nopakun	28 June 1999	
Belgium	Philippe Berg	30 September 1999	
Denmark	Bjane Bladbjerg	30 September 1999	
Pakistan	Tayyab Siddiqui	30 September 1999	
Uruguay	Luis Albert Caresse Prieto	30 September 1999	
Costa Rica	Isabel Montero de la Cámara	12 January 2000	
Cyprus	Nicolas D. Macris	12 January 2000	
Japan	Takaji Kunimatsu	12 January 2000	
Slovenia	Stanko Buser	12 January 2000	
United States	J. Richard Fredericks	12 January 2000	
Italy	Lorenzo Ferrarin	9 June 2000	
Lebanon	Samir Hobeica	9 June 2000	
Morocco	Abdelmajid Alem	9 June 2000	
Greece	Eleftherios Danellis	4 October 2000	
Kyrgyzstan	Omar Sultanov	4 October 2000	
Turkey	Metin Örnekol	4 October 2000	
Philippines	Rora Navarro-Tolentino	4 October 2000	
Ukraine	Yevhen Bersheda	4 October 2000	
France	Régis de Belenet	6 November 2000	
Luxembourg	Yves Spautz	6 November 2000	
Peru	Arturo Montoya Stuva	6 November 2000	
Netherlands	Roelof Reinhold Smit	6 November 2000	
Argentina	Teresita de Jesús Vicente Solotango	8 January 2001	
Cuba	Miguel Angel Espeche Gil	8 January 2001	
India	Niranjan Natverlai Desai	8 January 2001	
Portugal	Rui Manuel Pereira Goulart de Àvila	8 January 2001	
Russia	Dmitrij Dmitrijewitsch Tscherkaschin	23 May 2001	
Canada	Jean-Paul Hubert	14 August 2001	
Poland	Jerzy Marganski	14 August 2001	
North Korea	Ri Tcheul	14 August 2001	
South Africa	Patricia Nozipho January-Bardill	14 August 2001	
South Korea	Dong-Suk Moon	14 August 2001	
United Kingdom	Basil Stephen Talbot Eastwood	14 August 2001	
Colombia	Maria Helena Ramirez Fadul	24 October 2001	
Ireland	John J. Lawton	24 October 2001	
Finland	Antti Antero Hynninen	24 October 2001	
Romania	Ioan Maxim	24 October 2001	
Sweden	Lars Magnuson	24 October 2001	
United States	Mercer Reynolds	24 October 2001	
Indonesia	Indro Yudono	9 January 2002	
North Macedonia	Ognen Maleski	9 January 2002	
Cyprus	Stavros A. Epaminondas	3 April 2002	
France	Michel de Bonnecorse Benault de Lubières	3 April 2002	
Mexico	José Luis Bernal Rodríguez	3 April 2002	
Albania	Leontiev Çuçi	14 August 2002	
Argentina	Guillermo Enrique Gonzalez	14 August 2002	
Austria	Ulrike Tilly	10 October 2002	
Bulgaria	Ivanka Dimitrova Petkova	13 November 2002	
Croatia	Mladen Andrlić	13 November 2002	
Iceland	Kjartan Jóhannsson	13 November 2002	
India	Praveen Lal Goyal	13 November 2002	
Mongolia	Khasbazaryn Bekhbat	13 November 2002	
Thailand	Jullapong Nonsrichai	13 November 2002	
Iran	Majid Takht Ravanchi	9 January 2003	
Japan	Yuji Nakamura	9 January 2003	
Norway	Helga Hernes	9 January 2003	
Portugal	Manuel Henrique de Mello e Castro de Mendonça Côrte-Real	9 January 2003	
France	Jacques Rummelhardt	3 April 2003	
Hungary	Gergely Pröhle	3 April 2003	
Slovenia	Miha Vrhunec	3 April 2003	
Australia	Pamela Jean Fayle	14 August 2003	
Lithuania	Jonas Rudalevičius	14 August 2003	
Kyrgyzstan	Zeinep Shaimergenova	14 August 2003	
Morocco	Mohamed Guedira	14 August 2003	
Pakistan	Fauzia Abbas	14 August 2003	
Spain	Gonzalo de Benito Secades	14 August 2003	
Ecuador	Jaime Marchán	3 October 2003	
Germany	Frank Elbe	3 October 2003	
Ireland	Joseph Lynch	3 October 2003	
Sovereign Military Order of Malta	Maximilian Turnauer	3 October 2003	
Serbia and Montenegro	Dragoljub Popović	3 October 2003	
Belgium	Marc Baptist	3 November 2003	
Denmark	Birger Dan Nielsen	3 November 2003	
Italy	Pier Benedetto Francese	3 November 2003	
Malta	Albert V. Muscat-Inglott	3 November 2003	
Monaco	Gilles Noghes	3 November 2003	
Switzerland	Paul Seger	3 November 2003	
United States	Pamela Willeford	3 December 2003	
Israel	Aviv Shir-On	8 January 2004	
Laos	Khouanta Phalivong	8 January 2004	
Chile	Cecilia Mackenna Echaurren	16 April 2004	
Colombia	Elena Echavarriá	16 April 2004	
United Kingdom	Simon Mark Featherstone	2 July 2004	
Brazil	Celina Maria Assumpção do Valle Pereira	13 August 2004	
South Korea	Won-hwa Park	13 August 2004	
Venezuela	Jorge Miguel Sierraalta Zavarce	13 August 2004	
Austria	Herbert Krauss	25 October 2004	
Monaco	Philippe Blanchi	25 October 2004	
Netherlands	Everhard Hofland	25 October 2004	
Thailand	Pradap Pibulsonggram	25 October 2004	
Bosnia and Herzegovina	Jasmina Pašalić	13 December 2004	
Holy See	Francesco Canalini	13 December 2004	
North Macedonia	Mahmud Ibrahimi	13 December 2004	
Turkey	Alev Kılıç	13 December 2004	
Norway	Lars Petter Forberg	13 January 2005	
Cuba	Ana María Rovira Ingidua	9 March 2005	
Greece	Jean-Alexandre Thomoglou	9 March 2005	
Argentina	Antonio Eduardo Seward	8 June 2005	
Bahrain	Adel Yousif Sater	8 June 2005	
Serbia and Montenegro, Serbia	Dragan Maršićanin	8 June 2005	
Canada	Robert Collette	17 October 2005	
Denmark	Sten Erik Malmborg Lilholt	17 October 2005	
Egypt	Nihad Baligh Shindi Zikry	17 October 2005	
Finland	Pekka Ojanen	17 October 2005	
Poland	Janusz Walenty Niesyto	17 October 2005	
South Africa	Konji Sebati	17 October 2005	
Cyprus	Kornelius Korneliou	30 November 2005	
Hungary	Jenő Boros	30 November 2005	
Luxembourg	Paul Faber	30 November 2005	
Algeria	Kamel Houhou	12 January 2006	
Indonesia	Lucia Helwinda Rustam	12 January 2006	
France	Jean-Didier Roisin	2 March 2006	
Germany	Andreas von Stechow	2 March 2006	
India	Amitava Tripathi	2 March 2006	
Latvia	Aivars Groza	2 March 2006	
Japan	Nobuyasu Abe	2 March 2006	
Pakistan	Elizabeth Asete Rodriguez	2 March 2006	
Australia	Ian Ferguson Kemish	8 June 2006	
Bulgaria	Atanas Pavlov Veltchev	8 June 2006	
Malaysia	Dato' Mohd Yusof bin Ahmad	8 June 2006	
Portugal	Eurico Jorge Henrigues Paes	8 June 2006	
Albania	Mehmet Elezi	14 August 2006	
Azerbaijan	Elchin Amirbayov	28 September 2006	
Brazil	Eduardo dos Santos	28 September 2006	
Denmark	Lars Møller	28 September 2006	
Sweden	Per Thöresson	28 September 2006	
Israel	Ilan Elgar	20 November 2006	
United States	Peter R. Coneway	20 November 2006	
Italy	Giuseppe Deodato	9 January 2007	
Lithuania	Giedrius Puodžiūnas	9 January 2007	
Monaco	Robert Fillon	9 January 2007	
Colombia	Claudia Jiménez Jaramillo	23 March 2007	
Philippines	Minerva Jean A. Falcon	23 March 2007	
South Korea	Chul-kyoon Chang	23 March 2007	
Pakistan	Ayesha Riyaz	27 June 2007	
Thailand	Chaiyong Satjipanon	27 June 2007	
Belgium	Régine de Clercq	18 October 2007	
Croatia	Jaksa Muljačić	18 October 2007	
Iceland	Kristinn F. Árnason	18 October 2007	
Iran	Keyvan Imani	18 October 2007	
Ireland	James Anthony Sharkey	18 October 2007	
Greece	Constantin Tritaris	28 November 2007	
Luxembourg	Gérard Philipps	28 November 2007	
Mexico	Luciano Joublanc	28 November 2007	
Russia	Igor Borisovich Bratchikov	28 November 2007	
Romania	Ionel Nicu Sava	10 January 2008	
Chile	Carolina Rossetti	17 April 2008	
Germany	Axel Hans Carlo Berg	28 August 2008	
Kazakhstan	Amanzhol Zhankuliyev	28 August 2008	
Poland	Jaroslaw Starzyk	28 August 2008	
Spain	Fernardo Riquelme Lidón	28 August 2008	
United Kingdom	John Roland Nichols	28 August 2008	
Andorra	Xavier Espot Miro	21 October 2008	
Cuba	Isaac Roberto Torres Barrios	21 October 2008	
France	Joëlle Bourgois	21 October 2008	
India	Chitra Narayanan	21 October 2008	
Egypt	Magdy Galal Shaarawy	21 October 2008	
Brazil	Maria Stela Pompeu Brasil Frota	17 December 2008	
Cyprus	Marios Lyssiotis	17 December 2008	
Hungary	Erzsébet Nagy	17 December 2008	
Niger	Adani Illo	17 December 2008	
Netherlands	Peter Schönherr	8 January 2009	
Lebanon	Hussein Rammal	8 April 2009	
Morocco	Mohammed Saïd Benryane	8 April 2009	
Philippines	Maria Theresa P. Lazaro	8 April 2009	
Ukraine	Ihor Dir	8 April 2009	
Vietnam	Hoang Van Nha	8 April 2009	
Bosnia and Herzegovina	Jakob Finci	17 June 2009	
Norway	Rolf Trolle Andersen	17 June 2009	
Serbia	Milan St. Protić	17 June 2009	
South Africa	George Johannes	17 June 2009	
Belgium	Marc Van Craen	9 September 2009	
Canada	Roberta Santi	9 September 2009	
Slovenia	Bojan Grobovšek	9 September 2009	
United States	Don Beyer	9 September 2009	
Algeria	El-Haoués Riache	25 November 2009	
Australia	Peter Martin Tesch	25 November 2009	
Denmark	Hans Klingenberg	25 November 2009	
Finland	Alpo Rusi	25 November 2009	
Greece	John Mourikis	25 November 2009	
Latvia	Indulis Bērziņš	25 November 2009	
Peru	Juan Carlos Gamarra Skeels	25 November 2009	
Saudi Arabia	Hazem Mohammad Karakotly	25 November 2009	
France	Alain Catta	9 December 2009	
Ireland	Anthony Mannix	9 December 2009	
Kazakhstan	Mukhtar Tileubardi	9 December 2009	
Turkey	Mustafa Oguz Demiralp	9 December 2009	
Austria	Thomas Oberreiter	14 January 2010	
United Kingdom	Sarah Gillett	14 January 2010	
Andorra	Lluís Viu-Torres	12 May 2010	
Azerbaijan	Murad Nizami oglu Najafbayli	12 May 2010	
Indonesia	Djoko Susilo	12 May 2010	
Iran	Alireza Salari	12 May 2010	
South Korea	Jong-Il Kim	12 May 2010	
Colombia	Claudia Turbay Quintero	17 June 2010	
Mongolia	Luvsantseren Orgil	17 June 2010	
North Korea	Se Pyong So	17 June 2010	
Switzerland	Rita Adam	17 June 2010	
Argentina	Eduardo Maria de Lujan Airaldi	25 August 2010	
Slovakia	Ján Foltín	25 August 2010	
Ireland	Martin Burke	27 October 2010	
Malaysia	Dato' Ho May Yong	27 October 2010	
North Macedonia	Ramadan Nazifi	27 October 2010	
Turkey	Tanju Sümer	27 October 2010	
Czech Republic	Boris Lazar	13 January 2011	
Portugal	José Manuel de Carvalho Lameiras	13 January 2011	
Chile	Enrique Miguel Melkonian Stürmer	6 April 2011	
Paraguay	Rodolfo Luis González Garabelli	6 April 2011	
Spain	Miguel Ángel de Frutos Gómez	6 April 2011	
Thailand	Rathakit Manathat	6 April 2011	
Belgium	Jan Luykx	7 September 2011	
Georgia	Zurab Tchiaberashvilli	7 September 2011	
Germany	Peter Gottwald	7 September 2011	
Holy See	Diego Causero	7 September 2011	
Kyrgyzstan	Gulnara Iskakova	7 September 2011	
Laos	Yong Chanthalangsy	7 September 2011	
Nigeria	Umunna Humphrey Orjiako	28 October 2011	
Philippines	Leslie J. Baja	28 October 2011	
Thailand	Arbhorn Manasvanich	28 October 2011	
Austria	Arthur Winkler-Hermaden	12 January 2012	
Netherlands	Engelbertus Fredericus Maria Twaalfhoven	12 January 2012	
Pakistan	Muhammad Saleem	12 January 2012	
Brazil	Igor Kipman	15 March 2012	
Japan	Kazuyoshi Umemoto	15 March 2012	
Panama	Rodolfo Luis González Garabelli	15 March 2012	
Andorra	Enric Tarrado Vives	14 June 2012	
Ecuador	Rafael Paredes Proaño	14 June 2012	
Russia	Alexander Vasiljevich Golovin	14 June 2012	
Italy	Carla Zuppetti	7 September 2012	
Vietnam	The Phiet Nguyen	7 September 2012	
Azerbaijan	Akram Akif oglu Zeynalli	16 November 2012	
Costa Rica	Isabel Montero de la Cámara	16 November 2012	
Luxembourg	Jean Faltz	16 November 2012	
Portugal	João Nugent Ramos Pinto	16 November 2012	
Bulgaria	Meglena Plugtscieva-Alexandrova	13 December 2012	
Croatia	Aleksandar Heina	13 December 2012	
Iceland	Martin Eyjólfsson	13 December 2012	
Kosovo	Naim Malaj	13 December 2012	
South Korea	Young-han Bae	13 December 2012	
Cuba	María el Pilar Fernández Otero	13 December 2012	
Cyprus	Costas A. Papademas	14 December 2012	
Egypt	Saher Hamza	14 December 2012	
Israel	Yigal B. Caspi	14 December 2012	
Nigeria	Fidelia Akuabata Njeze	14 December 2012	
Japan	Ryuhei Maeda	22 March 2013	
Lithuania	Jonas Rudalevicius	22 March 2013	
Monaco	Carole Lanteri	22 March 2013	
Romania	Anca Elena Opriş	22 March 2013	
Thailand	Chalermpol Thanchitt	22 March 2013	
France	Michel Duclos	2 May 2013	
Georgia	Irakli Kurashvili	2 May 2013	
Hungary	István Nagy	2 May 2013	
Nicaragua	Álvaro José Robelo González	2 May 2013	
Mexico	Jorge Castro-Valle Kuehne	29 August 2013	
Montenegro	Ljubiša Perović	29 August 2013	
Uruguay	Ricardo Nario Fagundez	29 August 2013	
Bosnia and Herzegovina	Boro Bronza	18 September 2013	
Colombia	Beatriz Londoño Soto	18 September 2013	
Denmark	Lars Vissing	18 September 2013	
Germany	Otto Lampe	18 September 2013	
Argentina	Antonio Gustavo Trombetta	30 October 2013	
Greece	Charalambos-Gerassimos Manessis	30 October 2013	
New Zealand	Peter Howard Rider	30 October 2013	
Slovenia	Franc Mikša	30 October 2013	
Canada	Jennifer MacIntyyre	27 November 2013	
Italy	Cosimo Risi	27 November 2013	
Pakistan	Aman Rashid	27 November 2013	
Peru	Luis Juan Chuquihuara Chil	27 November 2013	
Australia	David James Ritchie	26 February 2014	
Laos	Thongphane Savanphet	26 February 2014	
Latvia	Edgars Skuja	26 February 2014	
Malta	Savoiur F. Borg	26 February 2014	
United Kingdom	David John Moran	26 February 2014	
Albania	Illir Gjoni	25 April 2014	
Indonesia	Linggawaty Hakim	25 April 2014	
South Africa	Claudinah Ntini Ramosepele	25 April 2014	
India	Mysore Kapanaiah Lokesh	26 June 2014	
Malaysia	Mohd Zulkephli bin Mohd Noor	26 June 2014	
Qatar	Mubarak Kleefiekh Al-Hajri	26 June 2014	
United States	Suzan G. LeVine	26 June 2014	
Austria	Maria Rotheiser-Scotti	4 July 2014	
Switzerland	Tinguely Mattli	4 July 2014	
Mongolia	Purevdorj Vaanchig	29 August 2014	
New Zealand	Rod Harris	29 August 2014	
Niger	Ado Elhadji Abou	29 August 2014	
Denmark	Per Poulsen-Hansen	29 October 2014	
Iran	Gholamali Khoshroo	29 October 2014	
Slovakia	Andrea Elscheková-Matisová	29 October 2014	
Sweden	Magnus Hartog-Holm	29 October 2014	
Algeria	Moulay Mohammed Guendil	10 December 2014	
Chile	José Luis Balmaceda Serigos	10 December 2014	
Czech Republic	Karel Borůvka	10 December 2014	
Spain	Bernardo de Sicart Escoda	10 December 2014	
Belgium	Frank Recker	11 December 2014	
Finland	Jari Petteri Luoto	11 December 2014	
France	René Roudaut	11 December 2014	
Luxembourg	Marc Thill	11 December 2014	
Cyprus	Marios P. Ieronymides	13 March 2015	
Uruguay	Jorge Alberto Meyer Long	13 March 2015	
Portugal	Paulo Tiago Fernandes Jerónimo da Silva	15 March 2015	
San Marino	Silvia Marchetti	15 March 2015	
Serbia	Snežana Janković	22 May 2015	
Switzerland	Olaf Kjelsen	13 August 2015	
Denmark	Friis Arne Petersen	26 October 2015	
Ecuador	Gonzalo Ricardo Salvador Holguín	26 October 2015	
Netherlands	Anne Elisabeth Luwema	26 October 2015	
Holy See	Thomas E. Gullickson	26 October 2015	
Poland	Jaromir Sokołowski	26 October 2015	
Guinea	Fatoumata Baldé	11 December 2015	
India	Smita Purushottam	11 December 2015	
Ivory Coast	Kouadio Adjoumani	11 December 2015	
Philippines	Joselito Alegado Jimeno	11 December 2015	
Brazil	José Borges dos Santos Júnior	5 February 2016	
Ireland	Breifne O'Reilly	5 February 2016	
Montenegro	Damir Grbović	5 February 2016	
South Korea	Sang-kyu Lee	5 February 2016	
Colombia	Julían Jaramillo Escobar	27 April 2016	
Greece	Haroula Skolarikou	27 April 2016	
Italy	Marco Del Panta Ridolfi	27 April 2016	
Thailand	Nopadol Gunavibool	27 April 2016	
Vietnam	Pham Hai Bang	27 April 2016	
Japan	Etsuro Honda	22 June 2016	
Lithuania	Valentina Zeitler	22 June 2016	
Guatemala	Luis Fernando Carranza Cifuentes	10 November 2016	
Israel	Jacob Keidar	10 November 2016	
Moldova	Tudor Ulianovschi	10 November 2016	
Rwanda	Igor Cesar	10 November 2016	
Australia	Lynette Margaret Wood	14 December 2016	
Iceland	Högni S. Kristjánsson	14 December 2016	
Morocco	Lachen Azoulay	14 December 2016	
Poland	Jakub Kumoch	14 December 2016	
Turkey	İlhan Saygılı	14 December 2016	
Cuba	Francisco Aguilera de la Paz	8 March 2017	
Egypt	Hisham Nehad Seifeldin	8 March 2017	
United Arab Emirates	Mohamed Sultan Abdalla Alowais Alshamsi	8 March 2017	
France	Anne Paugam	10 May 2017	
Kyrgyzstan	Daniiar Mukashev	10 May 2017	
Romania	Vlad Vasiliu	10 May 2017	
Russia	Sergey Viktorovich Garmonin	10 May 2017	
Bosnia and Herzegovina	Andjelko Grahovac	24 May 2017	
Kazakhstan	Zhanar Aitzhan	24 May 2017	
Kosovo	Nazane Breca	24 May 2017	
North Korea	Tae Song Han	24 May 2017	
Sudan	Mustafa Osman Ismail Elamin	24 May 2017	
Chile	Manuel Francisco Gormáz Lira	21 June 2017	
Laos	Kham-Inh Khitchadeth	21 June 2017	
Spain	Aurora Díaz-Rato Revuelta	21 June 2017	
Germany	Norbert Riedel	20 October 2017	
Mexico	Fernando Jorge Castro Trenti	20 October 2017	
Peru	Luis Enrique Chávez Basagoitia	20 October 2017	
Tunisia	Mourad Bourehla	20 October 2017	
Canada	Susan Nilla Bincoletto	22 December 2017	
Malaysia	Sharrina binti Abdullah	22 December 2017	
Pakistan	Ahmad Naseem Warraich	22 December 2017	
United Kingdom	Jane Caroline Owen	22 December 2017	
United States	Ed McMullen	22 December 2017	
Azerbaijan	Khanim Mammad Ibrahimova	21 February 2018	
Iceland	Harald Aspelund	21 February 2018	
Latvia	Veronika Erte	21 February 2018	
New Zealand	Rupert Thomas Holborow	21 February 2018	
Slovenia	Marta Kos	21 February 2018	
Costa Rica	Rubén Mario Salas Pereira	9 March 2018	
Finland	Timo Kalevi Rajakangas	9 March 2018	
India	George Sibi	9 March 2018	
South Africa	Sankie Dolly Mthembi-Mahanyele	9 March 2018	
South Korea	Haeryong Kwon	9 March 2018	
Georgia	David Jalagania	16 May 2018	
Indonesia	Muliaman Dharmansyah Hadad	16 May 2018	
Niger	Fatima D. Sidikou	16 May 2018	
Nigeria	Baba Madugu	16 May 2018	
Portugal	António Manuel Ricoca Freire	16 May 2018	
Lebanon	Rola Noureddine	20 June 2018	
Mongolia	Lundeg Purevsuren	20 June 2018	
Philippines	Denis Yap Lepatan	20 June 2018	
Switzerland	Pietro Piffaretti	20 June 2018	
Austria	Elisabeth Bertagnoli	6 July 2018	
Iran	Mohammadreza Haji Karim Jabbari	13 September 2018	
Thailand	Chakri Srichawana	13 September 2018	
Afghanistan	Khojesta Fana Ebrahimkhel	26 October 2018	
Guatemala	Arturo Romeo Duarte Ortiz	26 October 2018	
Luxembourg	Jean-Claude Meyer	26 October 2018	
Antigua and Barbuda	Dario Item	13 December 2018	
Armenia	Ashot Smbatyan	13 December 2018	
Belgium	Willy Debuck	13 December 2018	
Brazil	Evandro de Sampaio Didonet	13 December 2018	
Panama	José A. Fábrega Roux	13 December 2018	
Argentina	Luis María Kreckler	7 February 2019	
Croatia	Andrea Bekić	7 February 2019	
Cyprus	Elena Rafti	7 February 2019	
Sovereign Military Order of Malta	Klaus Schweinsberg	7 February 2019	
Norway	Erik Førner	7 February 2019	
Benin	Eloi Laourou	26 June 2019	
Bulgaria	Radi Dragnev Naidenov	26 June 2019	
Chad	Mariam Ali Moussa	26 June 2019	
Saudi Arabia	Mansour bin Nasser Al Saud	26 June 2019	
Vietnam	Le Linh Lan	26 June 2019	
Bosnia and Herzegovina	Boro Bronza	30 October 2019	
Italy	Silvio Mignano	30 October 2019	
Lithuania	Donatas Kuslys	30 October 2019	
Peru	Ana Rosa María Valdivieso Santa María	30 October 2019	
Colombia	Sofía Alejandra Gaviria Correa	21 November 2019	
Czech Republic	Katerina Fialkova	21 November 2019	
Mexico	Cecilia Jaber Breceda	21 November 2019	
Netherlands	Hedda Samson	21 November 2019	
San Marino	Marcello Beccari	21 November 2019	
Bahrain	Yusuf Abdulkarim	24 April 2020	
Ireland	Eamon Hickey	24 April 2020	
Japan	Kojiro Shiraishi	24 April 2020	
Niger	Souleymane Issakou	24 April 2020	
France	Frédéric Journès	13 May 2020	
Greece	Ékaterini Xagorari	13 May 2020	
Kazakhstan	Alibek Bakayev	13 May 2020	
North Macedonia	Kenan Ramadani	13 May 2020	
Malta	Albert Friggieri	29 October 2020	
Poland	Iwona Kozlowska	29 October 2020	
Slovakia	Alexander Micovcin	29 October 2020	
Uruguay	Alejandro Garofali Acosta	29 October 2020	
Denmark	Susanne Hyldelund	10 December 2020	
Egypt	Wael El Sayed Mohamed Gad	10 December 2020	
Georgia	Revaz Lominadze	10 December 2020	
Rwanda	Marie Chantal Rwakazina	10 December 2020	
Sweden	Jan Ingemar Knutsson	10 December 2020	
Austria	Georg Diwald	21 December 2020	
Algeria	Salah Lebdioui	23 June 2021	
Angola	Cecília Caldeira da Conceição Rosário	23 June 2021	
Holy See	Martin Krebs	23 June 2021	
Hungary	József Czukor	23 June 2021	
India	Monika Kapil Mohta	23 June 2021	
Moldova	Tatiana Molcean	23 June 2021	
South Korea	Tae-Kang Roh	23 June 2021	
Spain	Victorio Redondo Baldrich	23 June 2021	
Turkey	Emine Ece Özbayoglu Acarsoy	23 June 2021	
Argentina	Alberto Pedro D'Alotto	10 December 2021	
Cuba	Adela Mayra Ruiz García	10 December 2021	
Finland	Valtteri Hirvonen	10 December 2021	
Israel	Ifat Reshef	10 December 2021	
Laos	Latsamy Keomany	10 December 2021	
Romania	Bogdan Mazuru	10 December 2021	
Saudi Arabia	Adel Siraj Merdad	10 December 2021	
Slovenia	Iztok Grmek	10 December 2021	
Tunisia	Tarek Bettaieb	10 December 2021	
Ukraine	Artem Rybchenko	10 December 2021	
United Arab Emirates	Obaid Salem Saeed Naser Alzaabi	10 December 2021	
United States	Scott Miller	16 February 2022	
Azerbaijan	Fuad Isgandarov	29 April 2022	
Brazil	Cláudia Fonseca Buzzi	29 April 2022	
Canada	Patrick David Wittmann	29 April 2022	
Guatemala	Jorge Alfredo Lemcke Arévalo	29 April 2022	
India	Sanjay Bhattacharyya	29 April 2022	
Kenya	Andrew Maina Kihurani	29 April 2022	
Kosovo	Sami Ukelli	29 April 2022	
Pakistan	Aamir Shouket	29 April 2022	
Latvia	Guna Japiņa,	29 April 2022	
Spain	María Celsa Nuño García	29 April 2022	
Armenia	Viktor Yengibaryan	15 September 2022	
Belgium	Pascal Heyman	15 September 2022	
Luxembourg	Conrad A. Bruch	15 September 2022	
New Zealand	Craig John Hawke	15 September 2022	
Peru	Luis Alberto Castro Joo	15 September 2022	
Portugal	Júlio José de Oliveira Carranca Vilela	15 September 2022	
Qatar	Mohammed Bin Jaham Abdulaziz Al-Kuwari	15 September 2022	
Vietnam	Phung The Long	15 September 2022	
Chile	Frank McShane Tressler Zamorano	16 February 2023	
Dominican Republic	Pablo Aramis Almigar Valentín Rosario	16 February 2023	
Ecuador	Déborah Cristina Salgado Campaña	16 February 2023	
Mongolia	Davaasuren Gerelmaa	16 February 2023	
Norway	Kjersti Rødsmoen	16 February 2023	
Thailand	Chittipat Tongprasroeth	16 February 2023	
United Arab Emirates	Hissa Abdulla Ahmed Alotaiba	16 February 2023	
United Kingdom	James Squire	16 February 2023	
Australia	Elizabeth Louisa Day	28 June 2023	
Iceland	Einar Gunnarsson	28 June 2023	
Japan	Yoshinori Fujiyama	28 June 2023	
Lithuania	Lina Ruksteliene	28 June 2023	
South Africa	Phaswana Cleopus Sello Moloto	28 June 2023	
Sudan	Hassan Hamid Hassan	28 June 2023	
Uruguay	Alfredo Raggio Lafone	28 June 2023	
Venezuela	Roy Antonio María Chaderton Matos	28 June 2023	
Colombia	Francisco Javier Echeverri Lara	30 October 2023	
Indonesia	I Gede Ngurah Swajaya	30 October 2023	
Iran	Mahmoud Barimani	30 October 2023	
Ireland	Aoife McGarry	30 October 2023	
Kazakhstan	Kairat Sarzhanov	30 October 2023	
Kuwait	Jaqoub Yousef E. Kh. Alsanad	30 October 2023	
South Korea	Chang-rok Keum	30 October 2023	
Ukraine	Iryna Valentynivna Venediktova	30 October 2023	
Albania	Mustafa Nano	4 March 2024	
Andorra	Ferran Costa Marimon	4 March 2024	
Angola	Maria Filomena de Fátima Lobão Telo Delgado	4 March 2024	
France	Marion Paradas	4 March 2024	
Ghana	Emmanuel Kwame Asiedu Antwi	4 March 2024	
Guinea	Aliou Barry	4 March 2024	
India	Mridul Kumar	4 March 2024	
Italy	Gian Lorenzo Cornado	4 March 2024	
Netherlands	Karin Mössenlechner	4 March 2024	
Oman	Mahmood bin Hamed bin Nasser Al Hasani	4 March 2024	
Panama	Issamary Sánchez Ortega	4 March 2024	
Philippines	Bernard Faustino La Madrid Dy	4 March 2024	
Sweden	Carl Magnus Nesser	4 March 2024	
Algeria	Mohamed Lamine Laabas	25 October 2024	
Argentina	Gustavo Nerio Lunazzi	25 October 2024	
Austria	Katharina Kastner	25 October 2024	
Cyprus	Andreas Ignatiou	25 October 2024	
Czech Republic	Tomás Jan Podivínský	25 October 2024	
Denmark	Thomas Østrup Møller	25 October 2024	
Ecuador	Veronica Augusta Bustamante Ponce	25 October 2024	
Greece	Ekaterini Simopoulou	25 October 2024	
Kenya	Fouzia Abdirahman Abass	25 October 2024	
Kosovo	Mentor Latifi	25 October 2024	
Rwanda	James Ngango	25 October 2024	
Costa Rica	Ana Gabriela Massey Machado	8 May 2025	
Cuba	Laura Ivet Pujol Torres	8 May 2025	
Egypt	Mohamed Yehia Mohamed Negm	8 May 2025	
Moldova	Vladimir Cuc	8 May 2025	
San Marino	Beatrice Simoncini	8 May 2025	
Turkey	Şebnem İncesu	8 May 2025	
Burundi	Elisa Nkerabirori	12 August 2025	
Chad	Youssouf Abassalah	12 August 2025	
Georgia	Shota Getsadze	12 August 2025	
Laos	Daovy Vongxay	12 August 2025	
Pakistan	Marghoob Saleem Butt	12 August 2025	
Uzbekistan	Dilshod Akhatov	12 August 2025	
Austria	Maximilian Hennig	29 September 2025	
Belgium	Patrick Van Gheel	29 September 2025	
Brazil	Maria Luisa Escorel de Moraes	29 September 2025	
Canada	Jean-Paul Albert Lemieux	29 September 2025	
Chile	Carla Juliana Serazzi Chang	29 September 2025	
Finland	Okko-Pekka Salmimies	29 September 2025	
Germany	Markus Potzel	29 September 2025	
Israel	Tibor Shalev Schlosser	29 September 2025	
Luxembourg	Robert Lauer	29 September 2025	
Serbia	Ivan Trifunovic	29 September 2025	
Slovakia	Sona Budayová	29 September 2025	
Thailand	Pannabha Chandraramya	29 September 2025	
Montenegro	Marija Lakic Barfus	10 December 2025	
Panama	Joanna Villarreal Rodríguez	10 December 2025	
Peru	Julio Hernán Garro Gálvez	10 December 2025	
Rwanda	Urujeni Bakuramutsa	10 December 2025	
Saudi Arabia	Abdulrahman Arkan Aldawood	10 December 2025	
Bulgaria	Svetlan Stoev	12 March 2026	
Japan	Toshiro Iijima	12 March 2026	
Latvia	Ingrīda Levrence	12 March 2026	
Paraguay	Ramón Fernando Acosta Díaz	12 March 2026	
Albania	Ermal Dredha	1 July 2026	
Ghana	Esi Awuah	1 July 2026	
Lesotho	Benedict Tsiu Khathibe	1 July 2026	
Spain	Enrique Mora	1 July 2026	
Lebanon	Hussein Haidar	13 August 2026	
Vietnam	Mai Anh Chau	13 August 2026	
Cambodia	Sovann Ke	28 September 2026	
New Zealand	Jane Charlotte Coombs	28 September 2026	
Nigeria	Wahab Adekola Akande	28 September 2026	
South Korea	Taekyoon Kim	28 September 2026	
Switzerland	Gilles Roduit	28 September 2026	

== See also ==
- Foreign relations of Liechtenstein
- List of diplomatic missions of Liechtenstein
- List of diplomatic missions in Liechtenstein
