= Antti Hynninen =

Antti Hynninen may refer to:

- Antti Hynninen (diplomat)
- Antti Hynninen (musician)

== See also ==
- Antti Hynynen, Finnish footballer
- Antti Hanninen, Finnish farmer, lay preacher and politician
