= Liechtenstein–United States relations =

Liechtenstein – United States relations

- Liechtenstein: United States

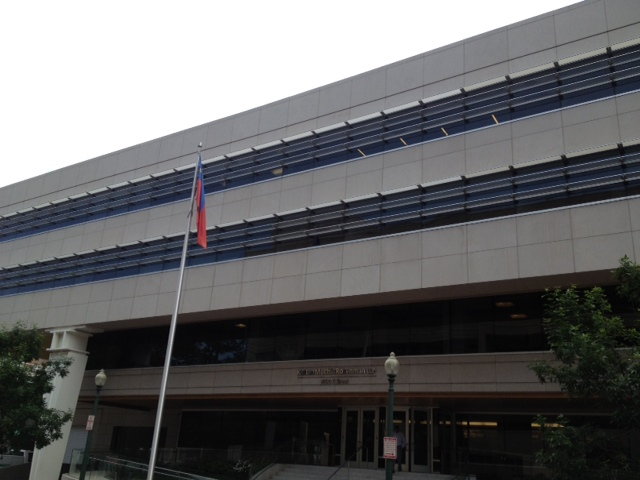
Liechtenstein embassy in Washington D.C., United States.

The United States and Liechtenstein executed their first treaty in 1926. Diplomatic relations were established in 1997. Since then, the relations between the two nations have been stable. Representatives of both countries in 2002 signed a mutual legal assistance treaty focused largely on jointly combating money laundering and other illegal banking activities.

The United States does not have an embassy in Liechtenstein, but the ambassador to Switzerland, located in Bern, is also accredited to Liechtenstein. As of August 12, 2022, the ambassador is Scott Miller. Liechtenstein, however, does have an embassy in the United States, located in Washington, D.C. Liechtenstein and the United States signed a extradition treaty in 1936. Both countries were signatories of the Helsinki Accords in 1975.

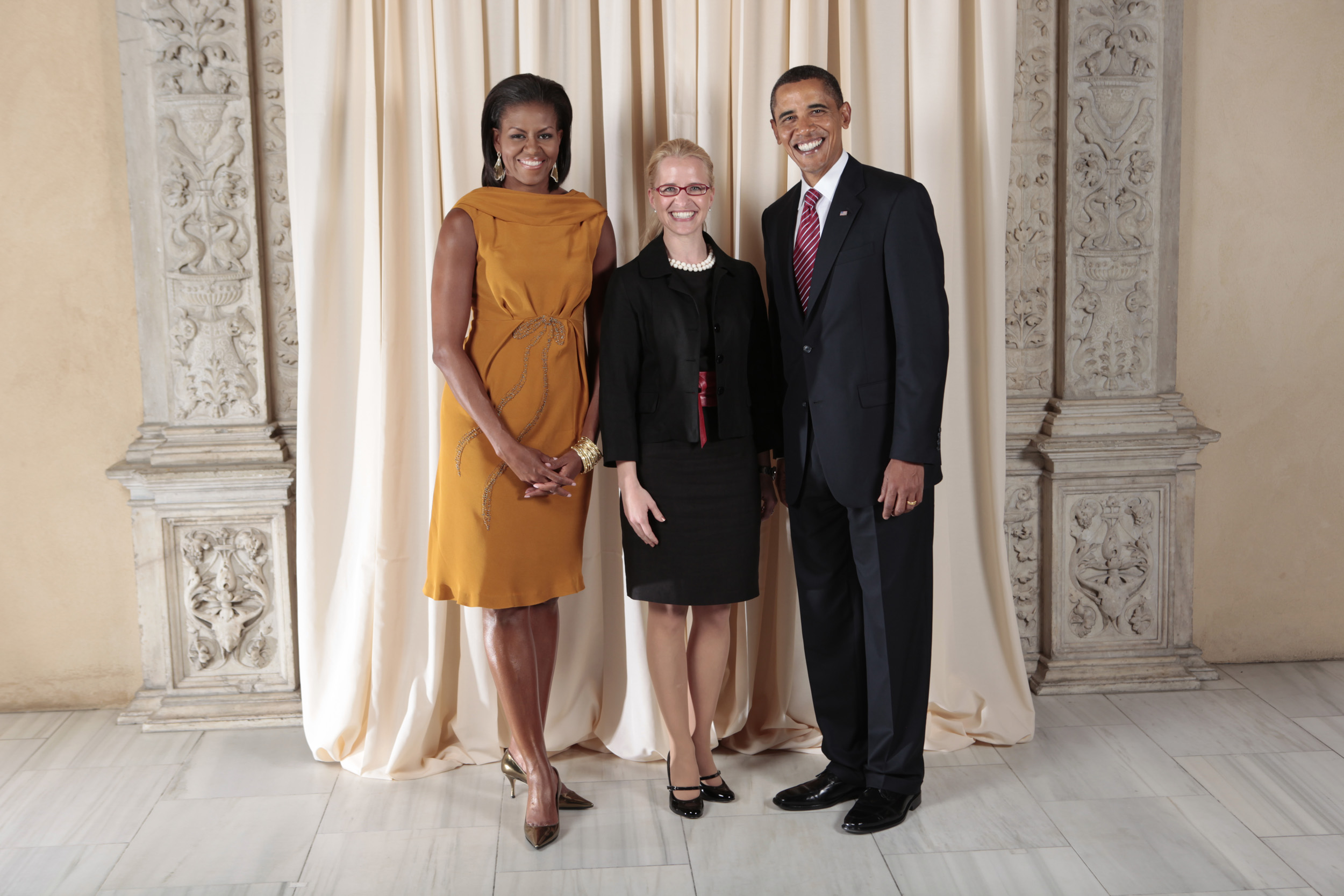
Aurelia Frick with Barack Obama and Michelle Obama on 23 September 2009.

== See also ==
- Foreign relations of the United States
- Foreign relations of Liechtenstein
