= Hong Kong–Liechtenstein relations =

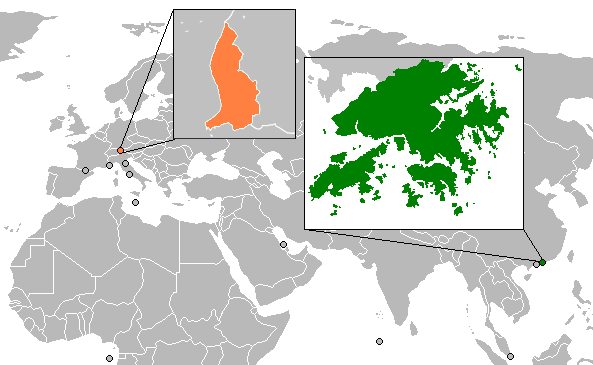

- Hong Kong: Liechtenstein

Hong Kong–Liechtenstein relations refers to international relations between Hong Kong and Liechtenstein.

== History ==
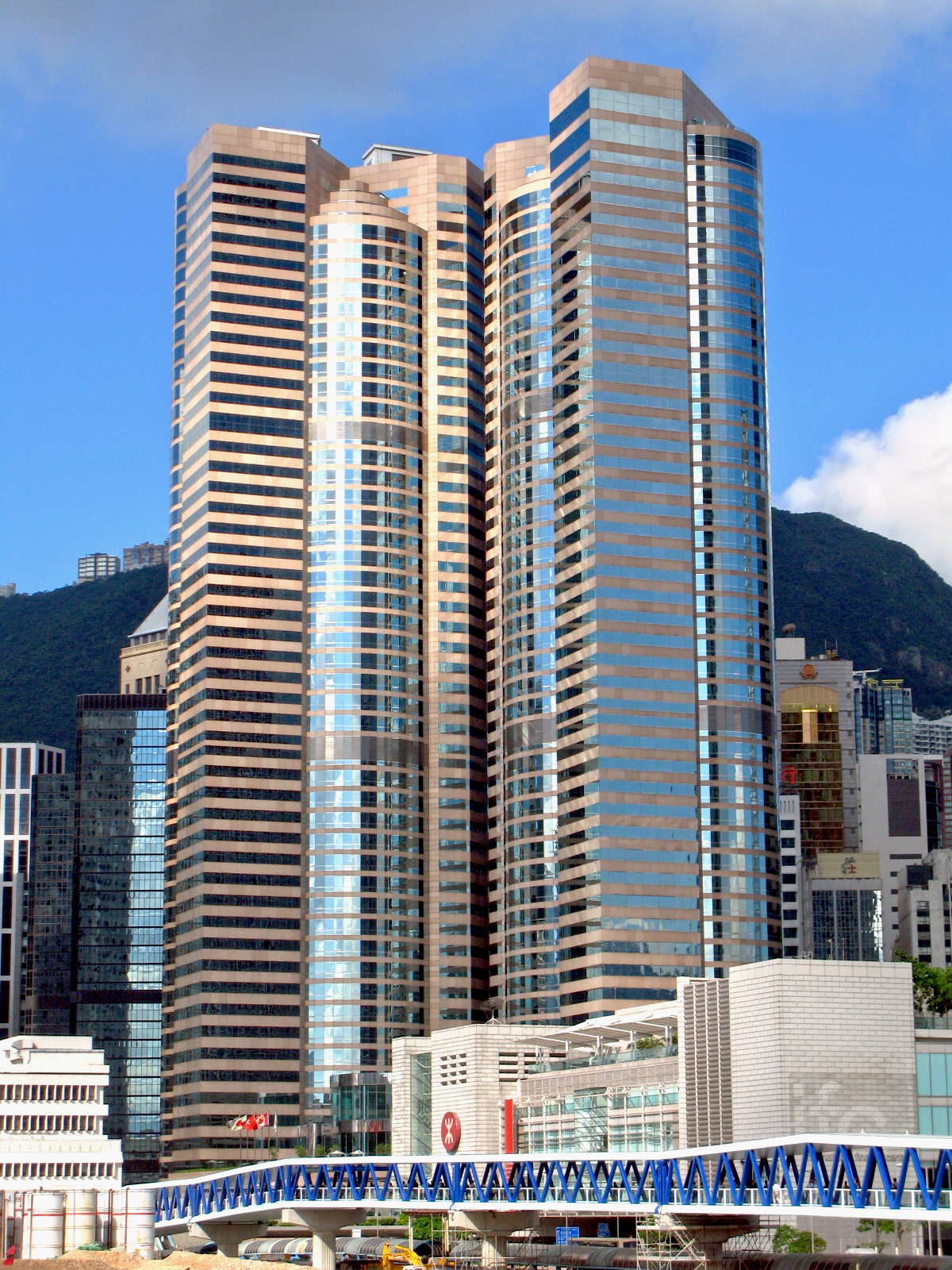
The Exchange Square (Hong Kong), where The Liechtenstein Honorary Consulate in Hong Kong is located.

As Liechtenstein and Hong Kong both grew around highly specialized industrial firms after the two World wars, as well being active in the international financial sector, Hong Kong has gradually developed among Liechtenstein's most important partners in Asia.

Liechtenstein's presence in Hong Kong has strengthened since the late 20th Century. For example, Hilti, a Liechtenstein producer of precision power tools, started business in Hong Kong in 1974. It was followed by the Princely family of Liechtenstein's private bank, LGT, in 1986. As one of the most notable Liechtensteiners in Hong Kong, H.S.H. Hereditary Prince Alois von und zu Liechtenstein, the Hereditary Prince of Liechtenstein, son of H.S.H. Prince Hans-Adam II von und zu Liechtenstein, spent three months in Hong Kong at the end of 1987 and the beginning of 1988 as an officer of the Coldstream Guards during his military career posted by the British Royal Military Academy.

The Liechtenstein Honorary Consulate in Hong Kong was opened in 2013, which according to the government of Liechtenstein, would "allow both countries to deepen their relations, especially in the areas of finance and exports." Liechtenstein does not have any diplomatic representation in Asia. The honorary consulate in Hong Kong is one of the only two Liechtenstein Honorary Consulates in Asia, the other being Singapore.

== Trade and Agreement ==
Liechtenstein and Hong Kong maintain well integrated and engaged economic relations. Both Liechtenstein and Hong Kong have been members of the World Trade Organization since 1995. Comprehensive Double Taxation Agreement (CDTA) was signed between Liechtenstein and Hong Kong on 12 August 2010, and enforced on 8 July 2011. The agreement has been written into Hong Kong's ordinance Cap. 112BU Inland Revenue (Double Taxation Relief and Prevention of Fiscal Evasion with respect to Taxes on Income and Capital) (Principality of Liechtenstein) Order ─ Schedule, and applies to taxes on income and on capital imposed on behalf of a contracting party or of its political subdivisions or local authorities. Hong Kong and the member nations of the European Free Trade Association (EFTA), including Liechtenstein, signed a comprehensive Free Trade Agreement on 21 June 2011 in Liechtenstein, which marks an important milestone as the agreement is the first free trade agreement of Hong Kong with any European country. The Agreement covers trade in services, goods, investment, and other related issues such as protection of intellectual property.

== High level visits ==
The Special Representative for Hong Kong Economic and Trade Affairs to the European Union, Mary Chow, visited Liechtenstein on 12 August 2010. Acting Secretary for Commerce and Economic Development, Gregory So, visited Schaan, Liechtenstein on 21 June 2011 for the signing of the Free Trade Agreement with EFTA. Foreign Minister of Liechtenstein, Aurelia Frick, visited Hong Kong on 28 June 2013 and met with Hong Kong Secretary of Commerce and Economic Development, Gregory So.

== See also ==
- Foreign relations of Hong Kong
- Foreign relations of Liechtenstein
