= Antti Hanninen =

Finnish politician (1873–1957)

Antti Hanninen (31 March 1873, Heinjoki - 22 November 1957) was a Finnish farmer and lay preacher. He was a member of the Parliament of Finland from 1911 to 1913, representing the Finnish Party.
