= List of diplomatic missions of Liechtenstein =

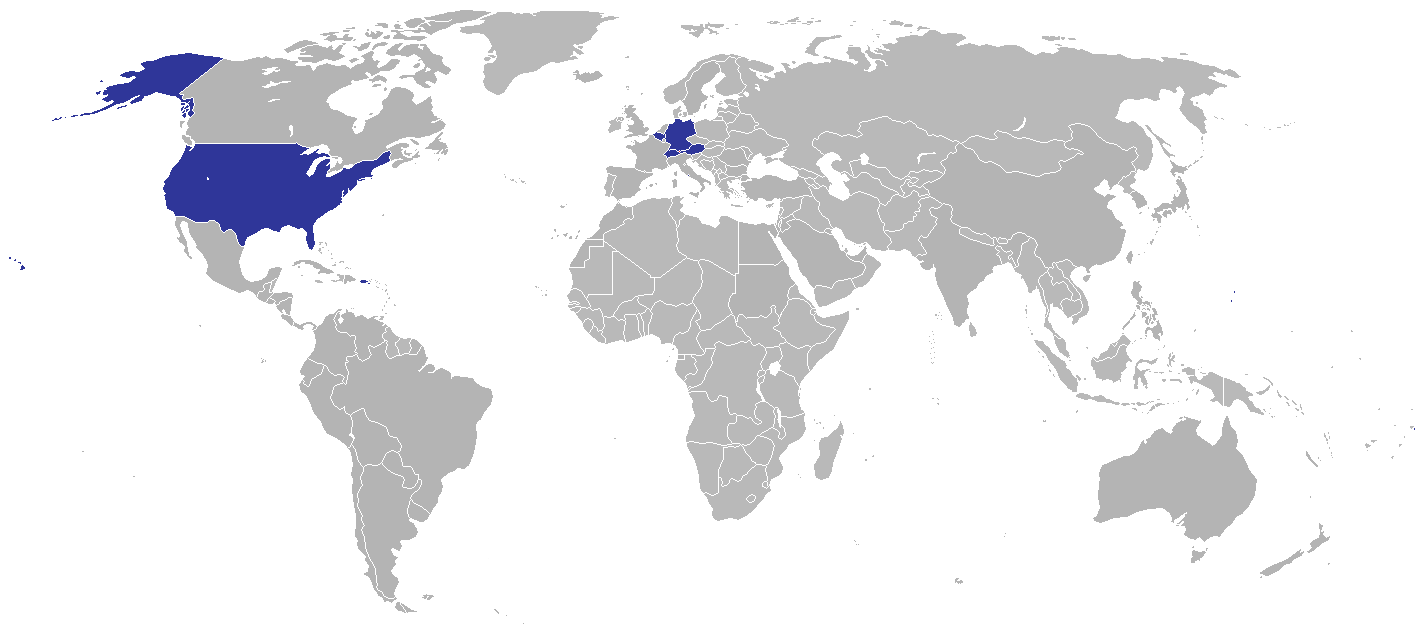
Diplomatic missions of Liechtenstein

This is a list of diplomatic missions of Liechtenstein, excluding honorary consulates. Owing to its size and population, the Principality of Liechtenstein maintains a very small network of diplomatic missions; four embassies in Central Europe, and one embassy in North America.

Since 1919, Switzerland has represented Liechtenstein in those countries wherein Liechtenstein itself does not maintain consular representation.

== Current missions ==
=== Americas ===
Host country	Host city	Mission	Concurrent accreditation	Ref.
United States	Washington, D.C.	Embassy		

=== Europe ===
Host country	Host city	Mission	Concurrent accreditation	Ref.
Austria	Vienna	Embassy	Countries: Czech Republic; International Organizations: Comprehensive Nuclear-Test-Ban Treaty Organization; Organization for Security and Co-operation in Europe; United Nations	
Belgium	Brussels	Embassy	International Organizations: European Union	
Germany	Berlin	Embassy		
Switzerland	Bern	Embassy	Countries: Albania	

=== Multilateral organizations ===
Organization	Host city	Host country	Mission	Concurrent accreditation	Ref.
Council of Europe	Strasbourg	France	Permanent Representative		
United Nations	Geneva	Switzerland	Permanent Mission	International Organizations: European Free Trade Association; World Trade Organization	
United Nations	New York City	United States	Permanent Mission	Countries: Guatemala	

== Gallery ==
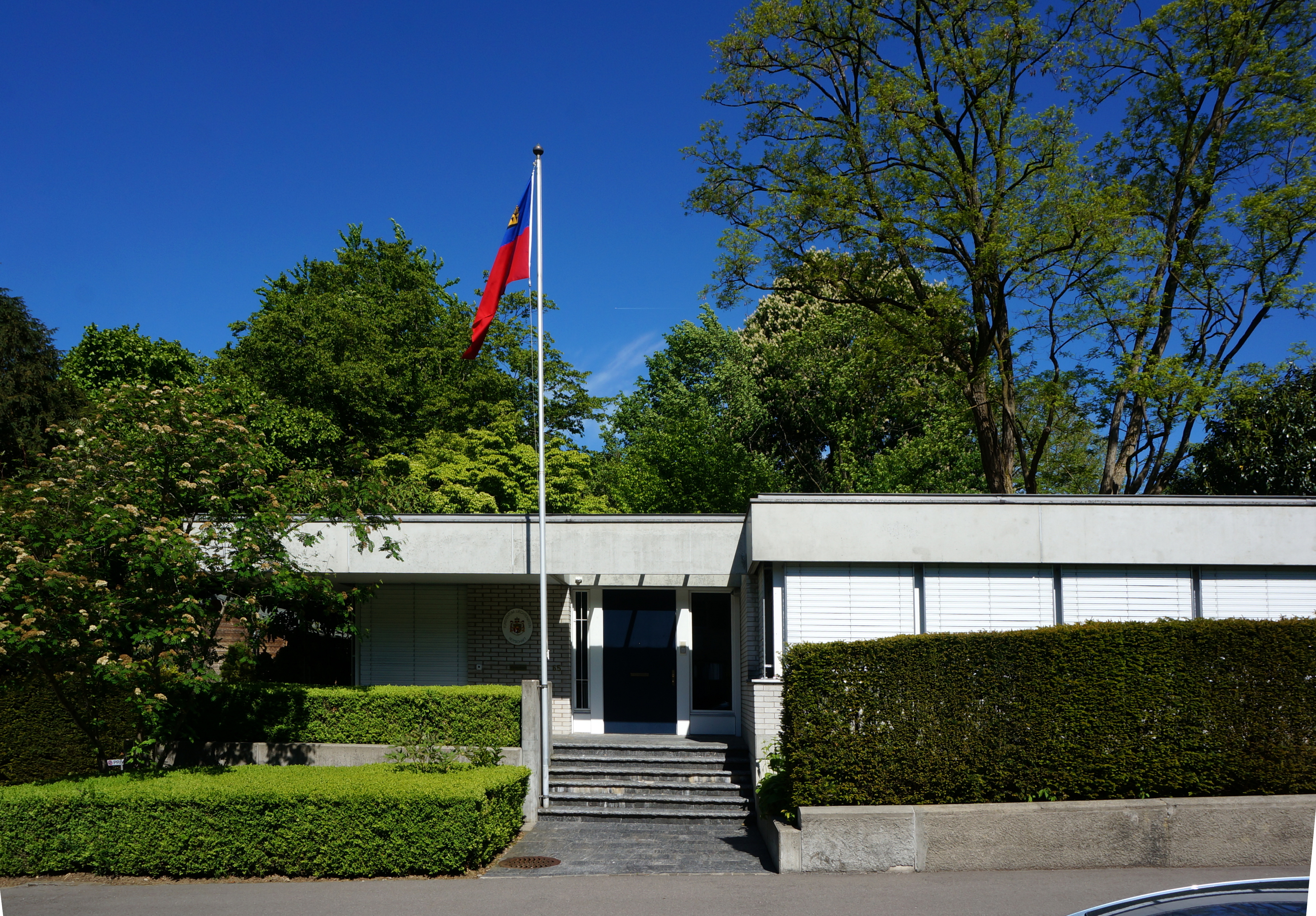
Embassy in Bern

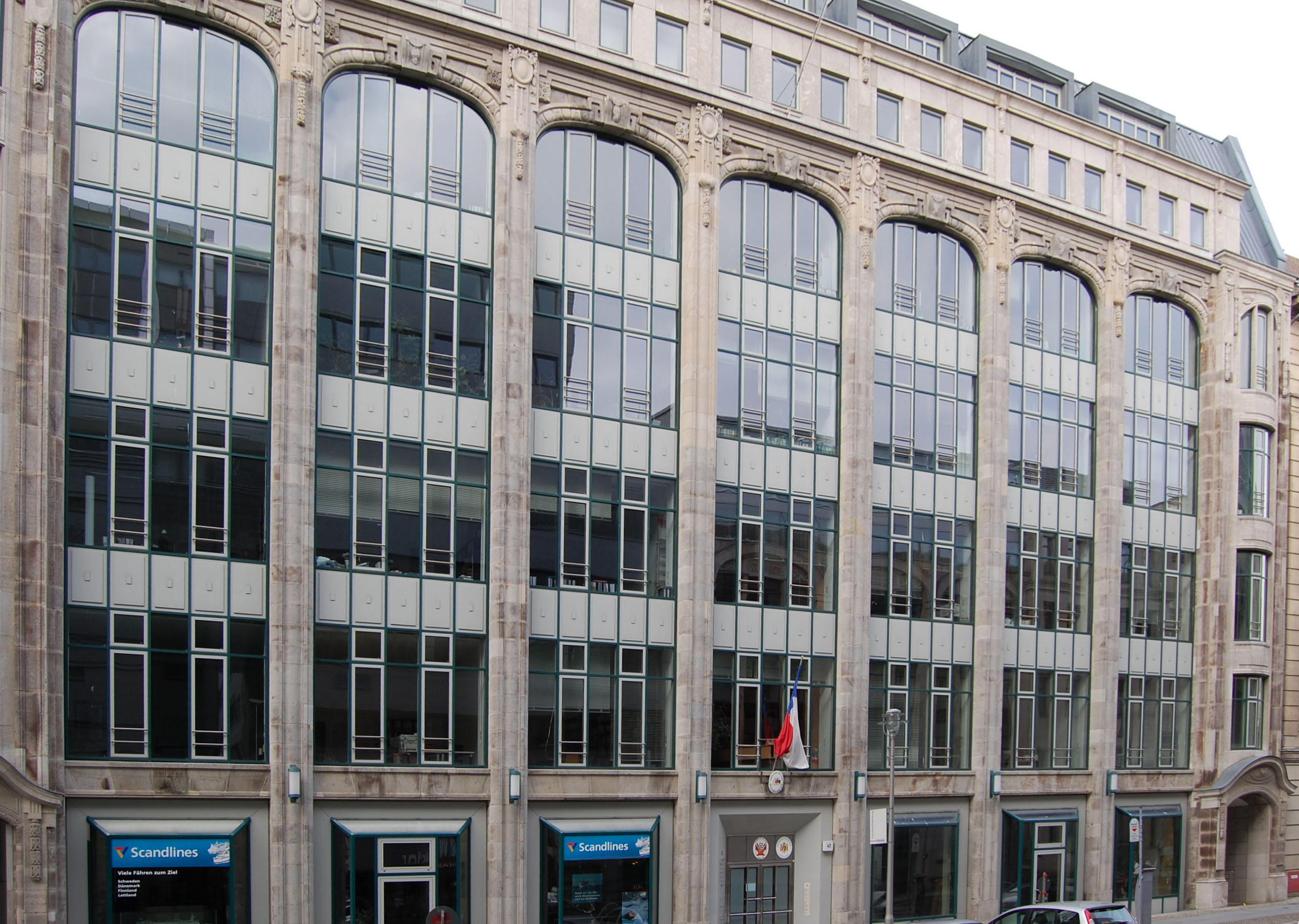
Building hosting the Embassy in Berlin

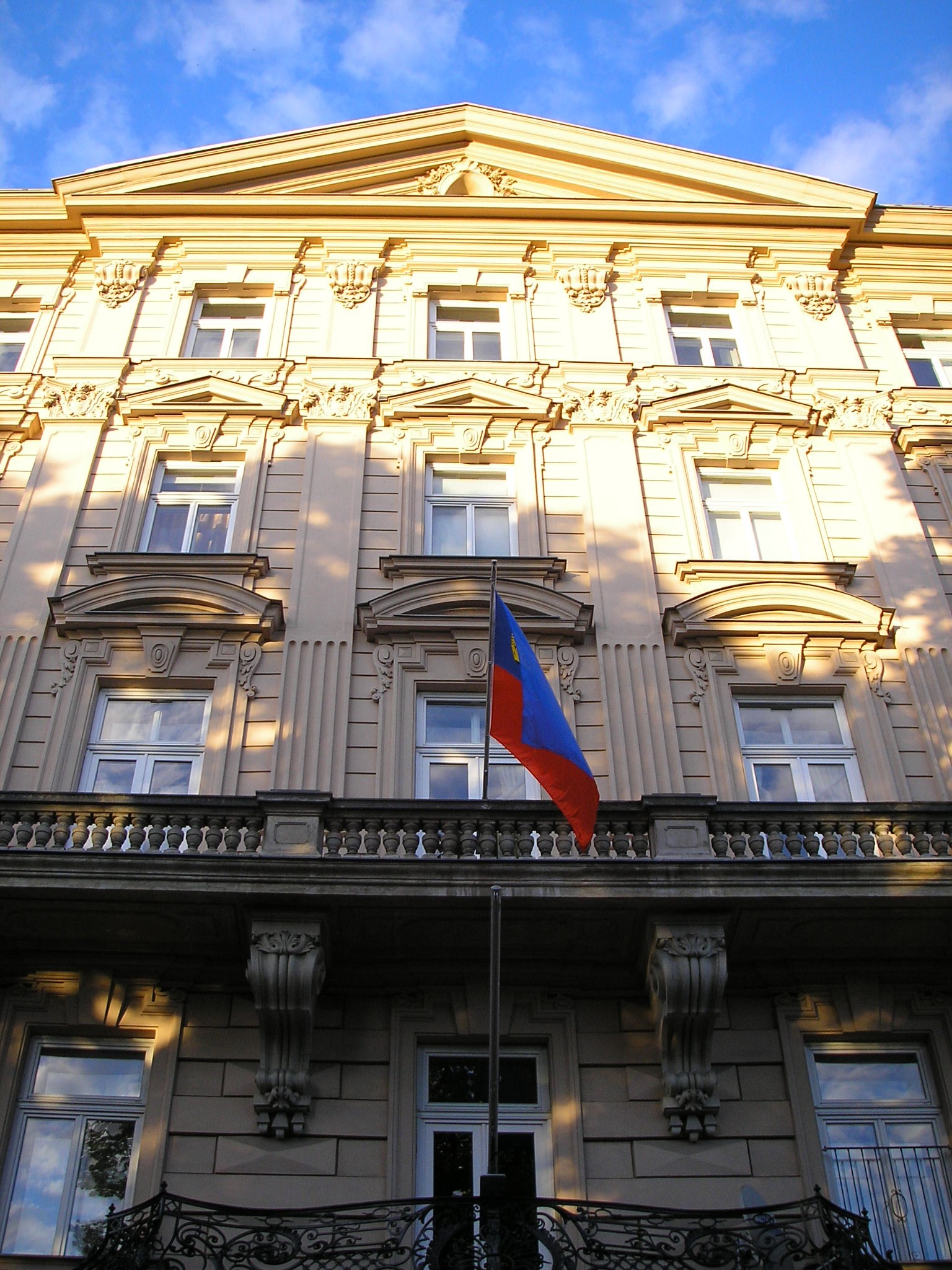
Embassy in Vienna

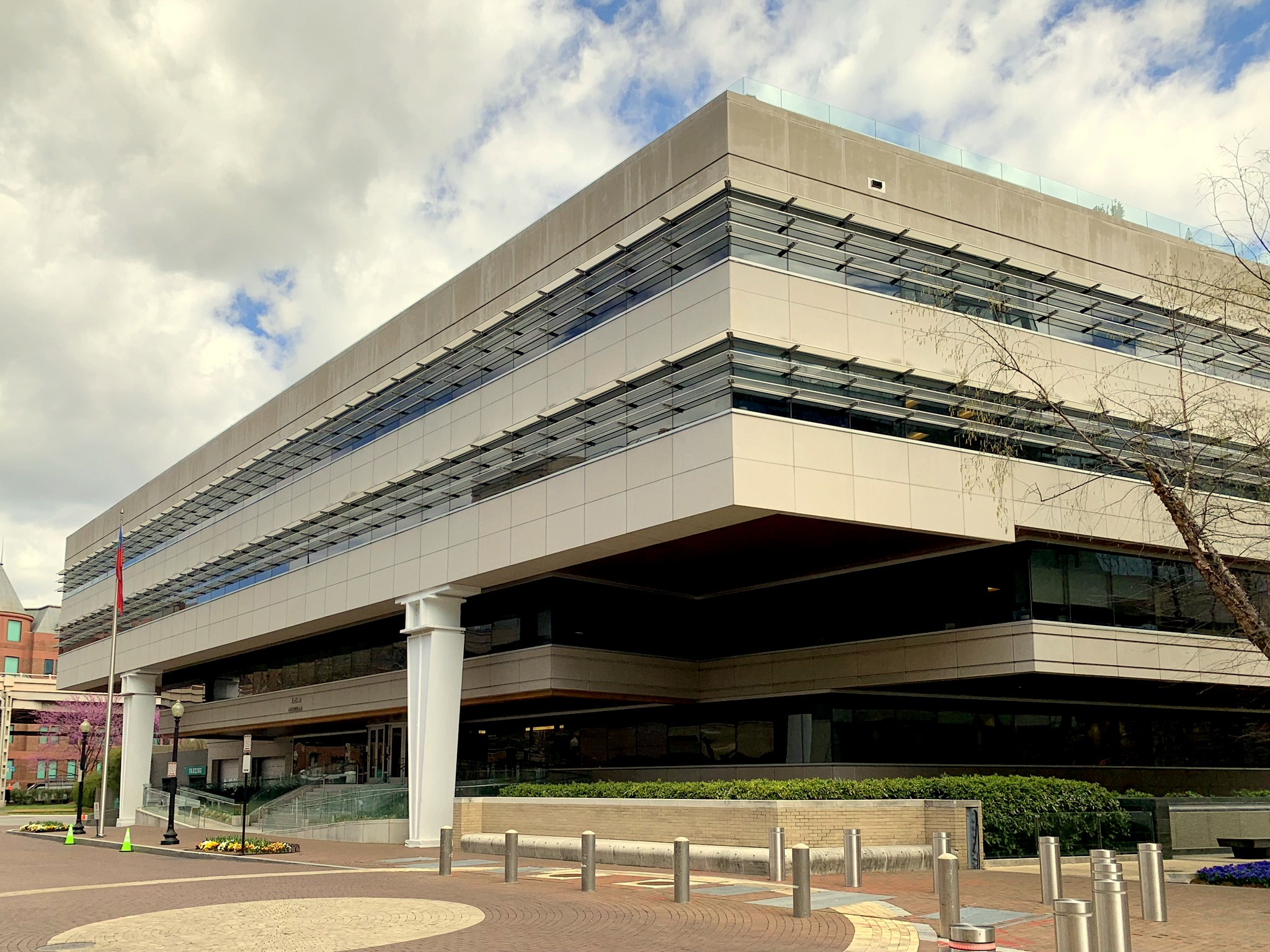
Building hosting the Embassy in Washington, D.C.

== See also ==
- Foreign relations of Liechtenstein
- List of diplomatic missions in Liechtenstein
- List of diplomatic missions of Switzerland
