= Liechtenstein–Ukraine relations =

- Liechtenstein: Ukraine

Diplomatic mission
- Embassy of Ukraine, Bern: Embassy of Switzerland, Kyiv

Envoy
- Ambassador Félix Baumann: Ambassador Iryna Venediktova

Liechtenstein–Ukraine relations are the bilateral relations of Liechtenstein and Ukraine. Both countries established diplomatic relations on 6 February 1992. Since then, the relations between the two countries have been stable.

Ukraine does not have an embassy in Liechtenstein, but it has an honorary consulate located in Vaduz. The Ukrainian ambassador to Switzerland, located in Bern, is also accredited to Liechtenstein. Similarly, the Swiss embassy in Kyiv also represents Liechtenstein.

== Diplomatic and economic cooperation ==
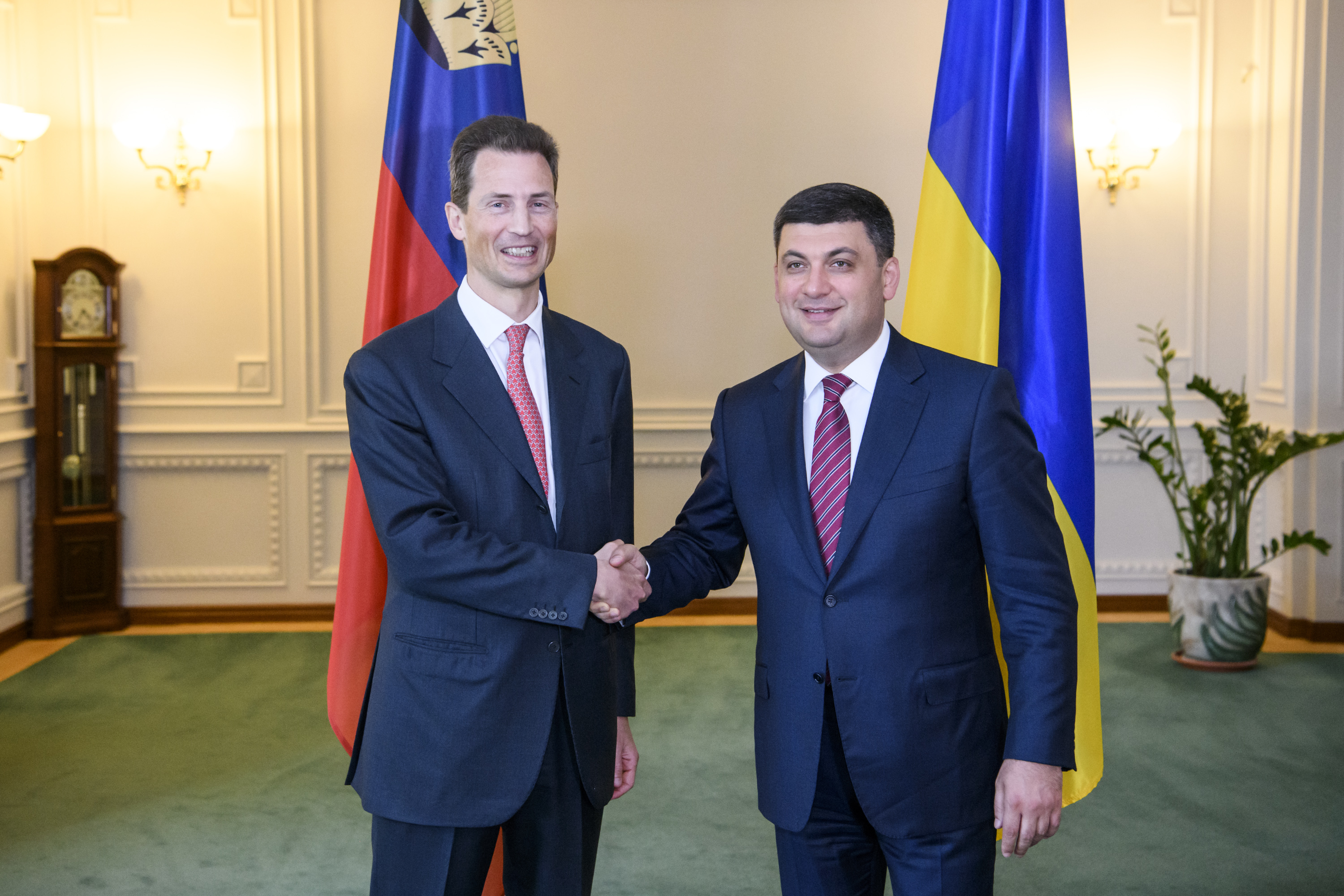
Alois, Hereditary Prince of Liechtenstein and Volodymyr Groysman in 2018

Since 1 June 2012 the EFTA-Ukraine Free Trade Agreement is in force between Ukraine and Liechtenstein.

Liechtenstein does not recognise the Russian annexation of Crimea and participated in the international sanctions against Russia in 2014. In 2017, Liechtenstein removed visa requirements for Ukrainian citizens.

In the wake of the Russian invasion of Ukraine, Liechtenstein condemned the invasion and applied EU sanctions against Russia, in return Russia declared the country as "taking unfriendly actions against Russia, Russian companies, and citizens". Liechtenstein has sent 500,000 CHF worth humanitarian aid to Ukraine and a subsequent loan of an additional 1.8 million CHF in February 2022 aimed at assisting those displaced as a result of the war.

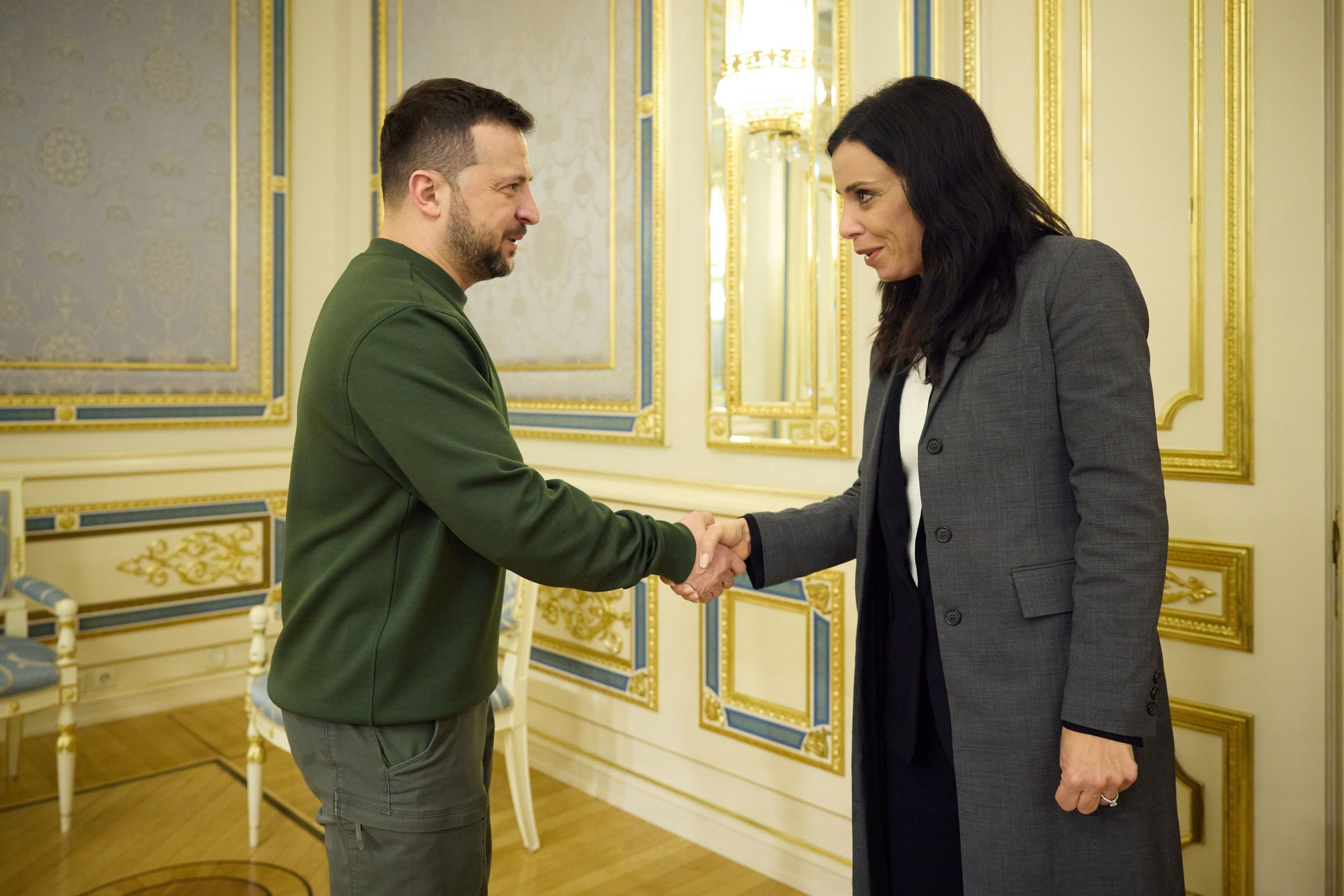
Dominique Hasler with Volodymyr Zelenskyy in March 2024

In June 2024, a Ukrainian honorary consulate was opened in Liechtenstein in a ceremony opened by Yevhen Perebyinis, Iryna Venediktova and Dominique Hasler, with lawyer David Jandrasits becoming honorary consul.

In November 2024 a petition was submitted to the Landtag of Liechtenstein against the proposed transfer of 8.8 million CHF (11 million US dollars) to Ukraine. However, the Landtag rejected the petition and subsequently approved the transfer on 7 November. In response, the petitioner Jürgen Schädler did not call for a referendum over the issue.

== High level visits and diplomatic meetings ==
- On 17 January 2017, Alois, Hereditary Prince of Liechtenstein and President of Ukraine Petro Poroshenko met where they discussed trade and investment between the two countries. Poroshenko thanked Liechtenstein for its involvement in EU sanctions against Russia.
- In June 2018, Alois, Hereditary Prince of Liechtenstein and his wife visited Ukraine where they met with President of Ukraine Petro Poroshenko and Prime Minister of Ukraine Volodymyr Groysman in Kyiv respectively. They discussed cooperation between the International Red Cross and the Ukrainian Red Cross Society. They also placed flowers on the Tomb of the Unknown Soldier.
- On 17 January 2023, Alois, Hereditary Prince of Liechtenstein met with First Lady of Ukraine Olena Zelenska in Davos, Switzerland. They discussed Russian war crimes in the 2022 Russian invasion of Ukraine.
- In March 2024 Liechtenstein foreign minister Dominique Hasler visited Ukraine at the invitation of Olena Zelenska. She visited the Olena Zelenska Foundation and also met with President of Ukraine Volodymyr Zelenskyy.
