= France–Liechtenstein relations =

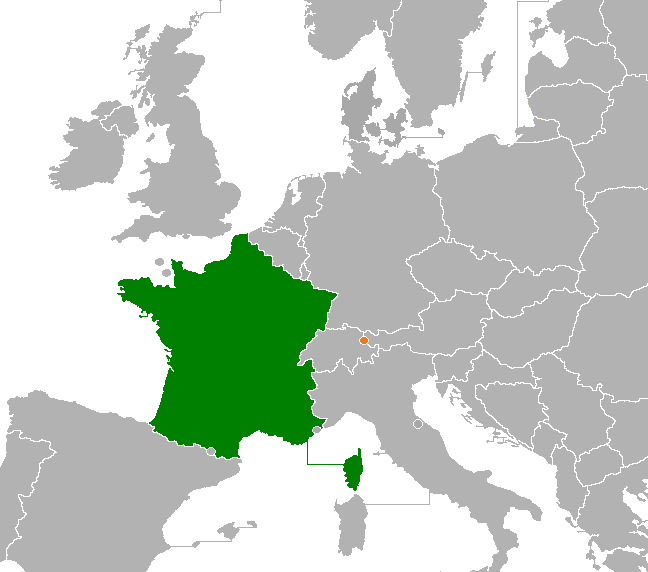

- France: Liechtenstein

Diplomatic mission
- Embassy of France, Bern: Embassy of Switzerland, Paris

France–Liechtenstein relations are the bilateral relations of France and Liechtenstein, dating back to the Napoleonic wars. Since then, relations between the two countries have been stable.

France does not have an embassy in Liechtenstein. The French ambassador to Switzerland, located in Bern, is also accredited to Liechtenstein. Similarly, the Swiss embassy in Paris also represents Liechtenstein.

== History ==
=== Napoleonic wars ===
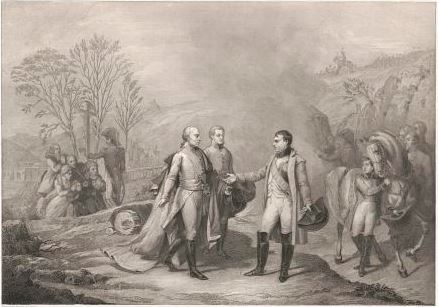
Johann I with Francis II and Napoleon following the Battle of Austerlitz on 5 December 1805

In the War of the First Coalition, Liechtenstein, as part of the Holy Roman Empire, contributed approximately 20 troops to the coalition forces from 1793 to 1796 to oppose the French under the leadership of Napoleon I. During the War of the Second Coalition, France invaded Liechtenstein on 6 March 1799 and plundered several towns, including Nendeln that was burned by French troops, which resulted in the deaths of four people. The Austrian and Volgraberg state militias under the command of Lieutenant Field Marshal Franjo Jelačić defeated 18,000 French troops stationed in Liechtenstein under the command of General André Masséna and liberated the country by 14 May.

In 1806, Liechtenstein was one of the principalities and counties that Maximilian I of Bavaria wanted to annex as his price for joining the Confederation of the Rhine, but Napoleon refused because he appreciated the personal qualities of Johann I as a negotiator, Austria's envoy during the negotiations leading to the Treaty of Pressburg. Thus Liechtenstein became a sovereign state later that year when it joined Napoleon's Confederation of the Rhine upon the dissolution of the Holy Roman Empire. The French once again occupied the country for a few years, but Liechtenstein regained its independence upon Napoleon's defeat in 1815.

=== World Wars ===
France sided with the Entente countries during World War I. Though Liechtenstein remained neutral throughout the conflict, it retained close ties to Austria-Hungary and was sympathetic to the Central Powers. At the outbreak of the war, France interned Liechtensteiners and partially confiscated their assets. From 1916, Liechtenstein was embargoed by the Entente countries until the end of the war. Despite diplomatic efforts by Liechtenstein, it received no representation in the negotiations or singing of the Treaty of Versailles, though the country received indirect recognition of its sovereignty in the Treaty of Saint-Germain-en-Laye.

France voted not to admit Liechtenstein when it applied to join the League of Nations in 1920; the League of Nations Assembly rejected the motion by a vote of 28 against and 1 in favour, with only Switzerland in support.

During World War II, Liechtenstein remained neutral, and its neutrality was not violated by any of the combatants. France had been on the side of the Allies since 1939, but was invaded by Nazi Germany the following year. Shortly after the war, Pierre Laval, the prime minister of Vichy France had attempted to seek refuge in Liechtenstein after being flown to the American-occupied zone of Austria, but was turned away.

=== 21st-century ===
France and Liechtenstein are both members of the European Economic Area and the Schengen Area. Liechtenstein-based companies, such as Hilti and Ivoclar, employee approximately 2500 people from France. In 2013, Liechtenstein exports to France amounted to approximately 305 million Swiss francs.

Following the 2008 Liechtenstein tax affair, the two countries signed a tax information exchange agreement on 22 September 2009, which came into force on 19 August 2010.

== See also ==
- France–Switzerland relations
