= Liechtenstein–Russia relations =

- Liechtenstein: Russia

Liechtenstein–Russia relations are the bilateral relations of Liechtenstein and Russia, dating back to the Napoleonic wars. Both countries established diplomatic relations on 30 January 1994. Since then, relations between the two countries have been distant, with Liechtenstein condemning the Russian invasion of Ukraine.

Russia does not have an embassy in Liechtenstein, but there is an honorary consulate located in Vaduz. The Russian ambassador to Switzerland, located in Bern, is also accredited to Liechtenstein. Similarly, the Swiss embassy in Moscow also represents Liechtenstein.

== History ==
=== Napoleonic wars ===
In the War of the First Coalition, Liechtenstein, as part of the Holy Roman Empire contributed approximately 20 troops to the coalition forces from 1793 to 1796. In the War of the Second Coalition and War of the Fifth Coalition the country became an area of conflict and transit between France, Austria and Russia.

After the Battle of Leipzig in October 1813, the Confederation of the Rhine, of which Liechtenstein was a member, collapsed. Liechtenstein sent a contingent of 80 men, which was incorporated into the army of the Grand Duchy of Baden, but did not see action.

=== Relations (1815–1914) ===
Liechtenstein under Austria, Russia and Prussia was a member of the Holy Alliance, in which all three members guaranteed Liechtenstein's sovereignty in 1815.

In 1867 Alexander II of Russia had offered Johann II, Prince of Liechtenstein to purchase Russian Alaska, but he refused as he believed the territory was useless.

From 1894 to 1898 Prince Franz of Liechtenstein, then heir presumptive of his brother, Johann II, served as Austrian Ambassador in Russia and became a Knight of the Order of Saint Alexander Nevsky and Order of St. Andrew, the highest order in Russia.

Engineer Johann Beck from Triesenberg emigrated to Russia in 1884 and opened a construction business in Yekaterinodar. This company was responsible for the building of several buildings and infrastructure projects in the area, such as a bridge over the Kuban River in 1908. Beck recruited several people from his home-country of Liechtenstein to work in his company, including future mayor of Vaduz Ludwig Ospelt.

=== World War I ===
Russia sided with the Entente countries during World War I. Though Liechtenstein remained neutral throughout the conflict, it retained close ties to Austria-Hungary and was sympathetic to the Central Powers.

At the outbreak of the war, Russia interned Liechtensteiners and partially confiscated their assets within the country. Liechtenstein was embargoed by the Entente from 1916 to the end of the war. During the war the Russian Empire collapsed, and was eventually replaced with the Soviet Union in 1922.

=== World War II ===
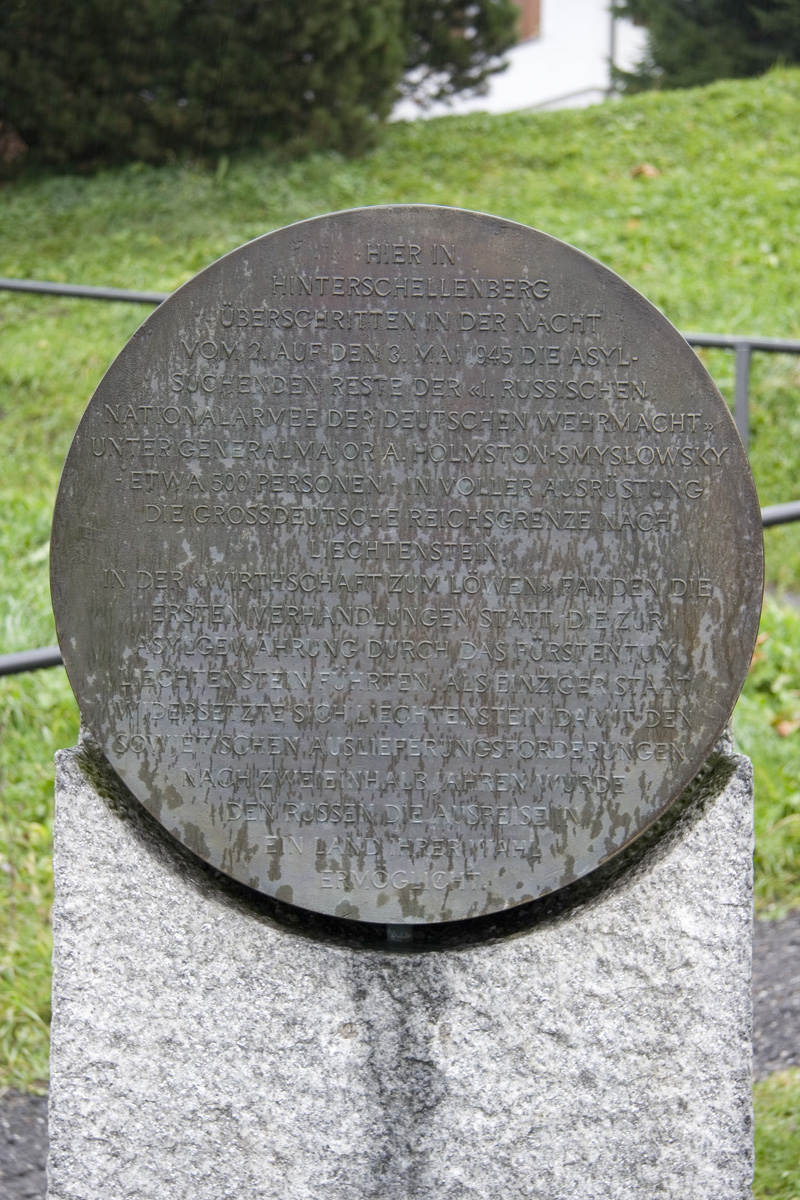
Monument to the First Russian National Army in Hinterschellenberg, Liechtenstein

Liechtenstein remained neutral throughout World War II, and its neutrality was not violated by any of the combatants. The Soviet Union had been on the side of the Allies since 1941.

Just before the end of the war, Franz Joseph II, Prince of Liechtenstein granted political asylum to First Russian National Army pro-Axis pro-emperor Vladimir White emigres led by General Boris Smyslovsky, who were being cared for by the Liechtenstein Red Cross. On 16 August 1945, the Soviet Union sent a delegation to Liechtenstein in an attempt to repatriate the Russians, which was refused despite increasing Soviet pressure to participate in the repatriation program. Eventually the government of Argentina offered the Russians asylum, and about a hundred people left. This is commemorated by a monument at the border town of Hinterschellenberg which is marked on the country's tourist map.

=== Cold war (1945–1991) ===
In the early stages of the Cold War, relations between Liechtenstein and the Soviet Union became tense due to the refusal to extradite the remnants of the First Russian National Army.

Liechtenstein was neutral during the Cold War, but sided with the West ideologically, politically and economically. The nuclear threat has led to the expansion of civil defence since the 1960s in Liechtenstein. In 1964–1965, the Liechtenstein government built a command bunker with protection against nuclear bombs in Vaduz. Liechtenstein condemned the suppression of the Hungarian Revolution of 1956 and the 1968 invasion of Czechoslovakia. Liechtenstein boycotted the Olympic Games twice- in 1956 in Melbourne in protest against the suppression of the Hungarian revolution and again in 1980 in Moscow due to the Soviet war in Afghanistan.

During the dissolution of the Soviet Union, huge quantities of Soviet currency and gold reserves were transferred to Liechtenstein.

=== Liechtenstein and the Russian Federation ===
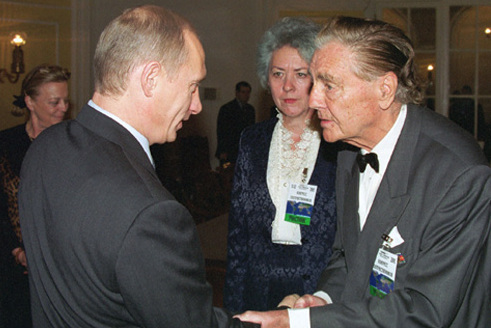
Vladimir Putin with Eduard von Falz-Fein in 2001

Russia and Liechtenstein established formal diplomatic relations for the first time on 30 January 1994. Russia opened an honorary consulate in Vaduz in 2006. Former Prime Minister of Liechtenstein, Markus Büchel became Honorary Consul of Russia in Liechtenstein in 2002. Russian-born Liechtensteiner Eduard von Falz-Fein played an important role in establishing economic relations between the two countries throughout the 2000s.

Liechtenstein does not recognise the Russian annexation of Crimea and participated in the international sanctions against Russia in 2014.

In the wake of the Russian invasion of Ukraine, Liechtenstein condemned the invasion and applied EU sanctions against Russia, in return Russia declared the country as "taking unfriendly actions against Russia, Russian companies, and citizens". Liechtenstein has sent 500,000 CHF worth humanitarian aid to Ukraine and a subsequent loan of an additional 1.8 million CHF in February 2022 aimed at assisting those displaced as a result of the war, greatly decreasing the relations between Liechtenstein and Russia.

== High level visits and diplomatic meetings ==
- On 14 September 2009 Deputy Russian Minister of Foreign Affairs Vladimir Titorenko and Liechtensteiner Minister of Foreign Affairs Aurelia Frick met in Moscow regarding the opening of an art exhibition entitled "Biedermeier. From the collection of the Prince of Lichtenstein" at the Pushkin Museum. They also discussed the establishment of economic and humanitarian aid between the two countries.
- On 14 June 2019 Russian Minister of Foreign Affairs Sergey Lavrov briefly met with Honorary Consul of Russia Markus Büchel during the first conference of Honorary Consuls of Russia, with Austria, Switzerland and Germany also participating.
