= List of diplomatic missions in Liechtenstein =

Coat of Arms of the Principality of Liechtenstein

This article lists diplomatic missions accredited to Liechtenstein. The Principality of Liechtenstein is one of only two sovereign countries in the world, the other being the Vatican City, (Note: Given the very small territory of the Vatican, all diplomatic missions accredited to the Holy See are physically located in surrounding Rome in Italy, or elsewhere.) without a resident embassy or career consulate located within its territory.

As of May 2026, a total of 111 ambassadors are accredited to Liechtenstein, with most being resident in Bern, Vienna, or Berlin.

== Honorary consulates ==
Resident in Vaduz unless otherwise noted

1. Austria (Mauren)
2. Belgium (Schaan)
3. Brazil (Mauren)
4. Bulgaria
5. Central African Republic (Triesen)
6. Chile (Triesen)
7. Croatia (Schaan)
8. Cyprus
9. Czechia
10. Denmark
11. Ecuador
12. Estonia
13. Finland
14. France (Triesen)
15. Germany (Gamprin)
16. Iceland (Schaan)
17. Indonesia (Triesen)
18. Italy (Schaan)
19. Japan (Schaan)
20. Kazakhstan (Triesen)
21. Latvia (Balzers)
22. Lithuania (Triesen)
23. Luxembourg
24. Malta (Ruggell)
25. Mexico (Mauren)
26. Monaco
27. Netherlands (Schaan)
28. North Macedonia
29. Philippines (Bendern)
30. Rwanda (Küsnacht)
31. Saint Vincent and the Grenadines
32. Slovakia
33. South Korea
34. Spain (Triesen)
35. Sweden
36. Switzerland
37. Turkey
38. Ukraine

== Gallery ==
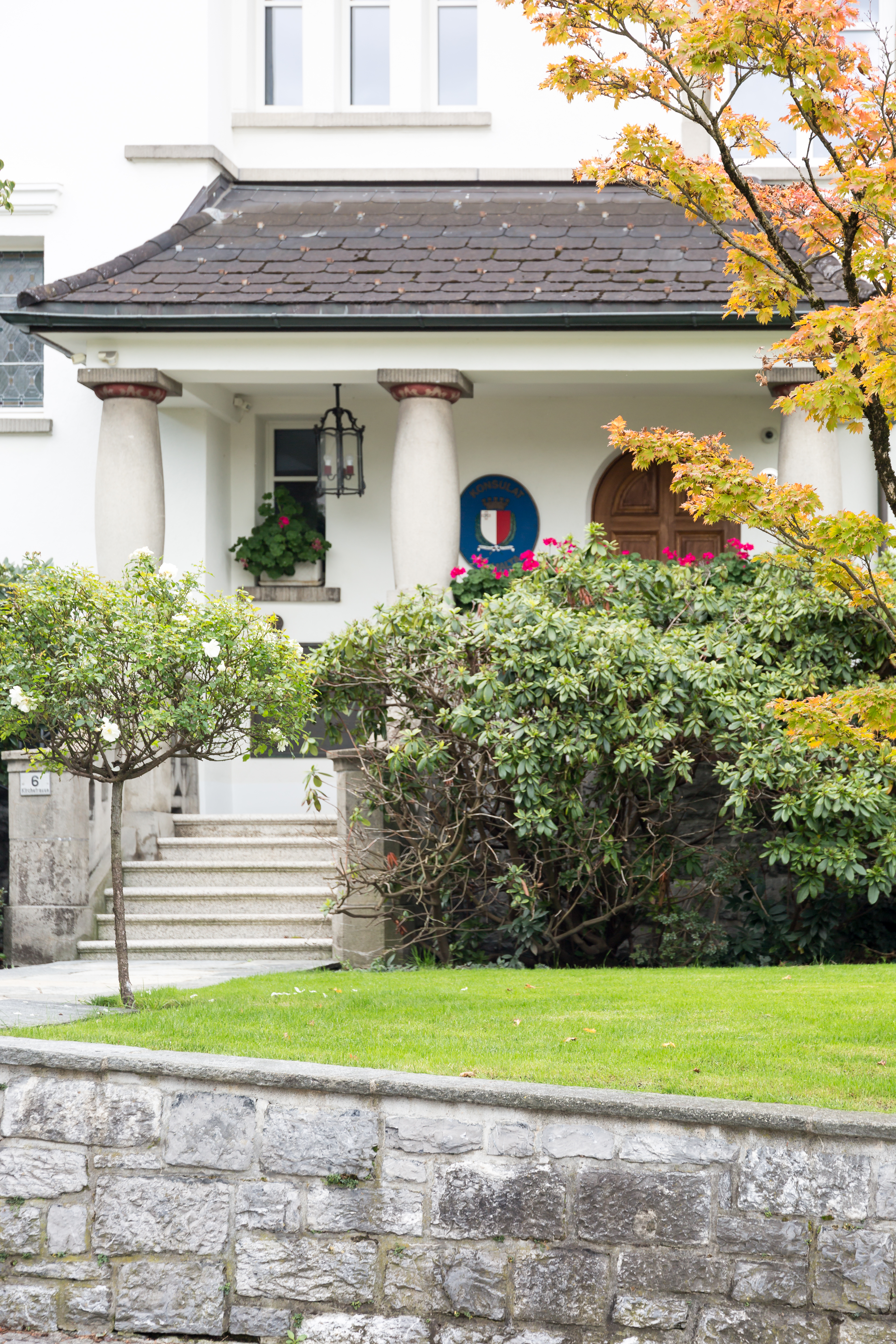
Honorary consulate of Malta in Schaan

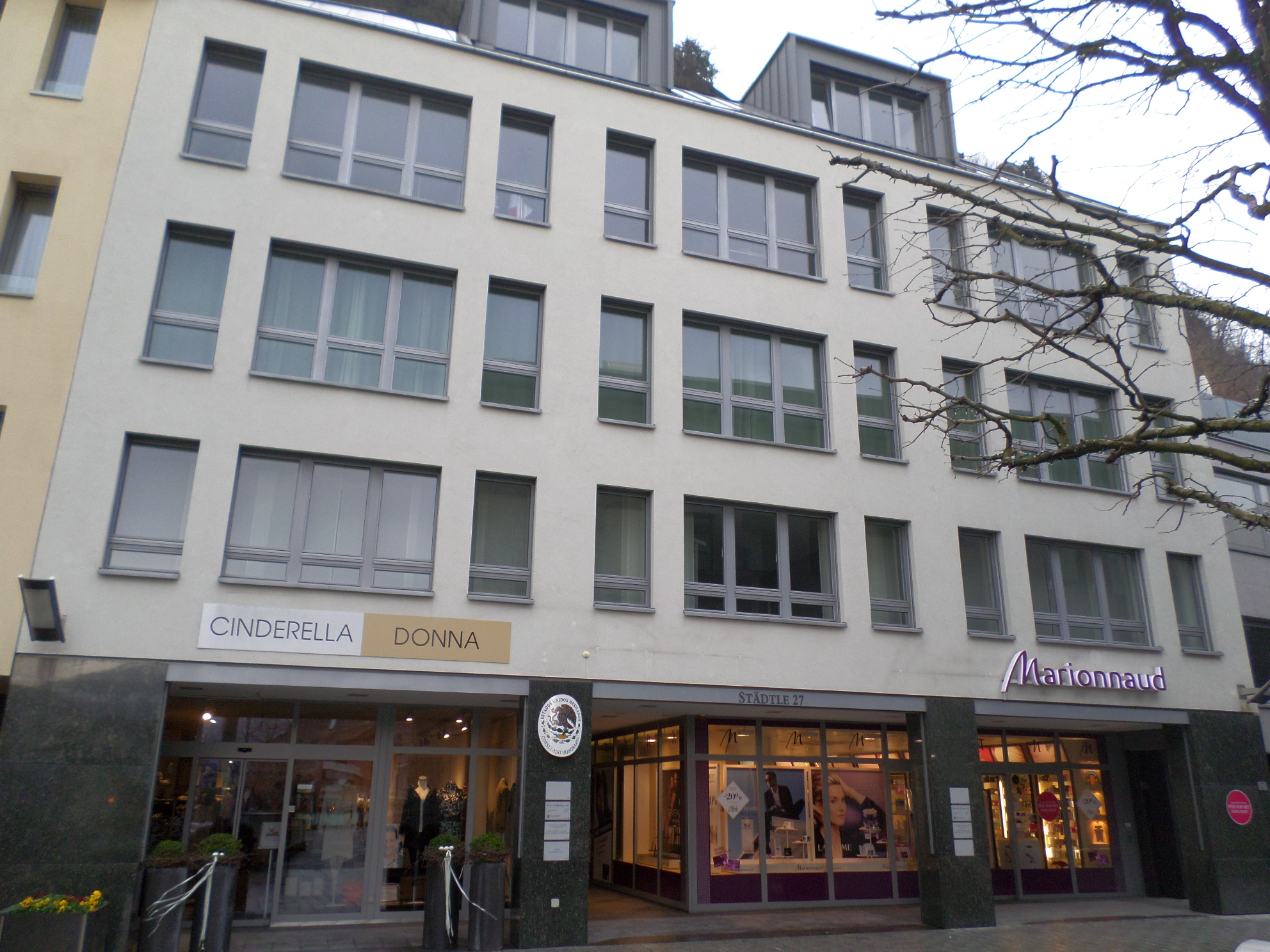
Honorary consulate of Mexico in Vaduz

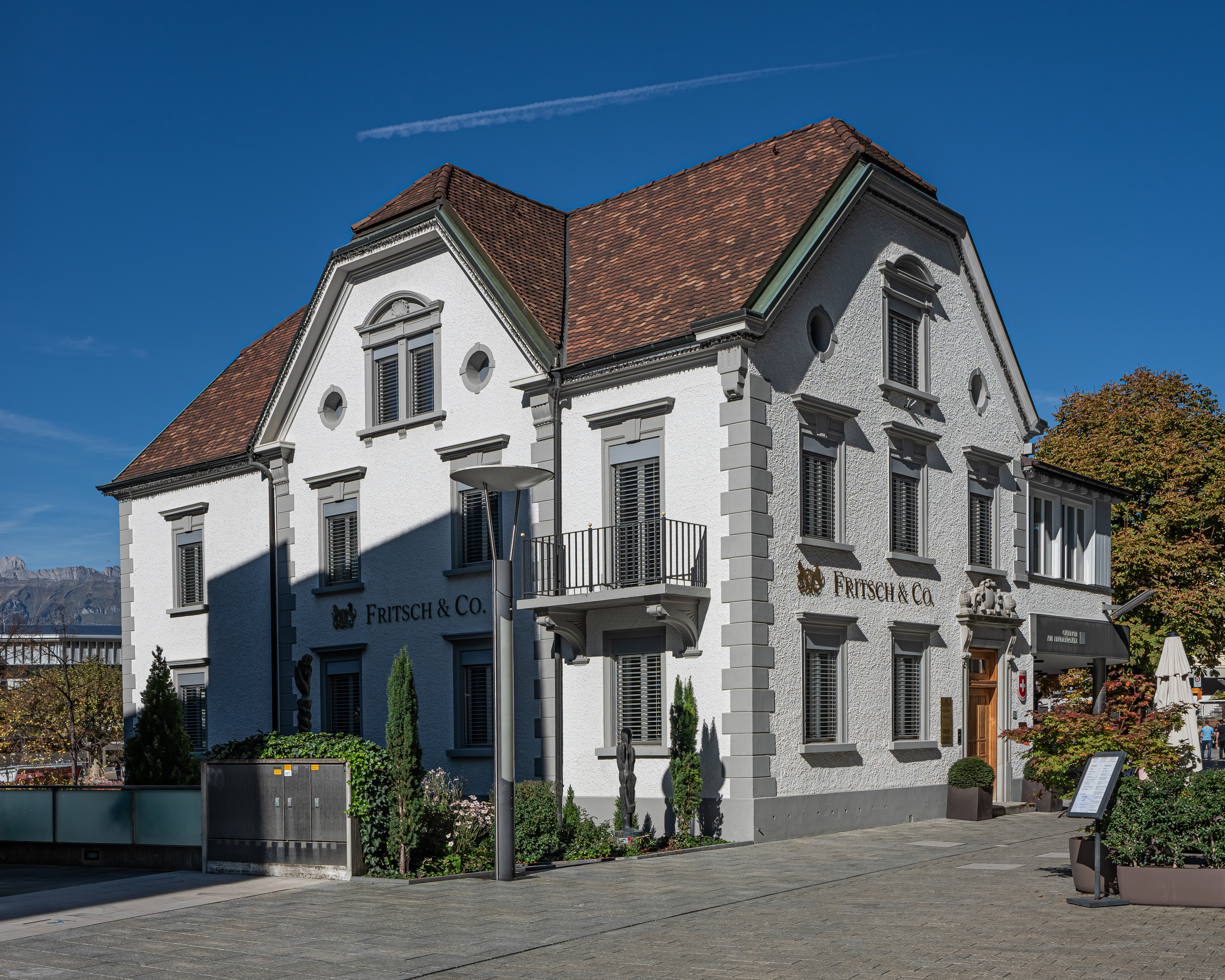
Honorary consulate of Switzerland in Vaduz

== Career consular missions accredited to Liechtenstein ==
All entries are consulates-general resident in Zürich, Switzerland, unless otherwise noted:

1. Brazil
2. China
3. France
4. Italy
5. Portugal
6. Serbia
7. Spain
8. Turkey

== Non-resident embassies accredited to Liechtenstein ==
=== Resident in Berlin, Germany ===
1. Armenia
2. Chad
3. Denmark
4. Guatemala
5. Guinea
6. New Zealand
7. Niger
8. Paraguay
9. Uzbekistan

=== Resident in Bern, Switzerland ===
1. Albania
2. Algeria
3. Angola
4. Argentina
5. Australia
6. Azerbaijan
7. Belgium
8. Bosnia and Herzegovina
9. Brazil
10. Bulgaria
11. Canada
12. Chile
13. Colombia
14. Costa Rica
15. Croatia
16. Cuba
17. Czechia
18. Dominican Republic
19. Ecuador
20. Egypt
21. European Union
22. Finland
23. France
24. Georgia
25. Germany
26. Ghana
27. Greece
28. Holy See
29. Hungary
30. India
31. Indonesia
32. Iran
33. Ireland
34. Israel
35. Italy
36. Ivory Coast
37. Japan
38. Kazakhstan
39. Kenya
40. Kosovo
41. Kuwait
42. Lebanon
43. Luxembourg
44. Malaysia
45. Mexico
46. Monaco
47. Montenegro
48. Morocco
49. Netherlands
50. Nigeria
51. North Korea
52. North Macedonia
53. Norway
54. Oman
55. Pakistan
56. Peru
57. Philippines
58. Poland
59. Portugal
60. Qatar
61. Romania
62. Russia
63. Saudi Arabia
64. Serbia
65. Slovakia
66. Slovenia
67. Spain
68. South Africa
69. South Korea
70. Sweden
71. Switzerland
72. Thailand
73. Tunisia
74. Turkey
75. United Arab Emirates
76. Ukraine
77. United Kingdom
78. United States
79. Uruguay
80. Venezuela
81. Vietnam

=== Resident in Geneva, Switzerland ===
1. Bahrain
2. Burundi
3. Iceland
4. Kyrgyzstan
5. Laos
6. Moldova
7. Mongolia
8. Rwanda
9. Sudan

=== Resident in Vienna, Austria ===
1. Afghanistan
2. Austria
3. Cyprus
4. Latvia
5. Lithuania
6. Nicaragua
7. Sovereign Military Order of Malta

=== Resident elsewhere ===
1. Andorra (Andorra la Vella)
2. Antigua and Barbuda (Madrid)
3. Malta (Valletta)
4. Panama (Paris)
5. San Marino (City of San Marino)

== See also ==
- Foreign relations of Liechtenstein
- List of diplomatic missions of Liechtenstein
