= India–Liechtenstein relations =

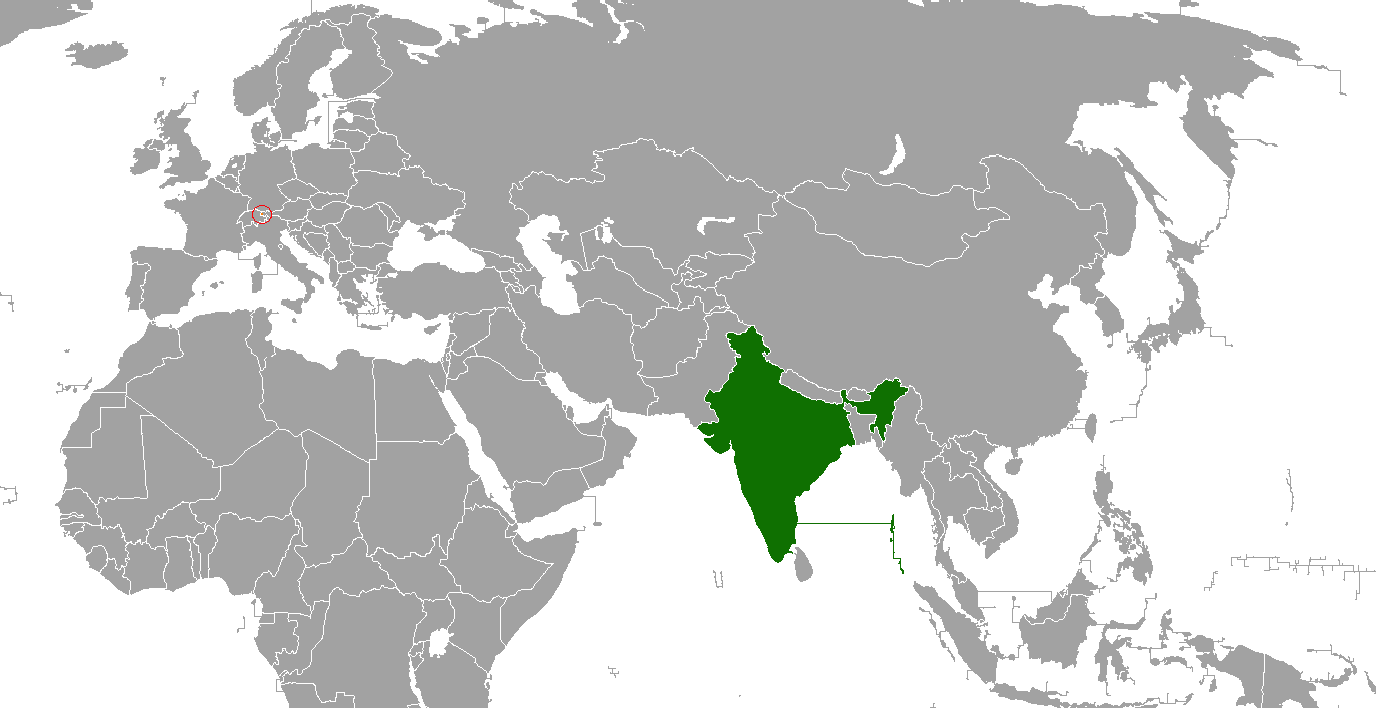

- India: Liechtenstein

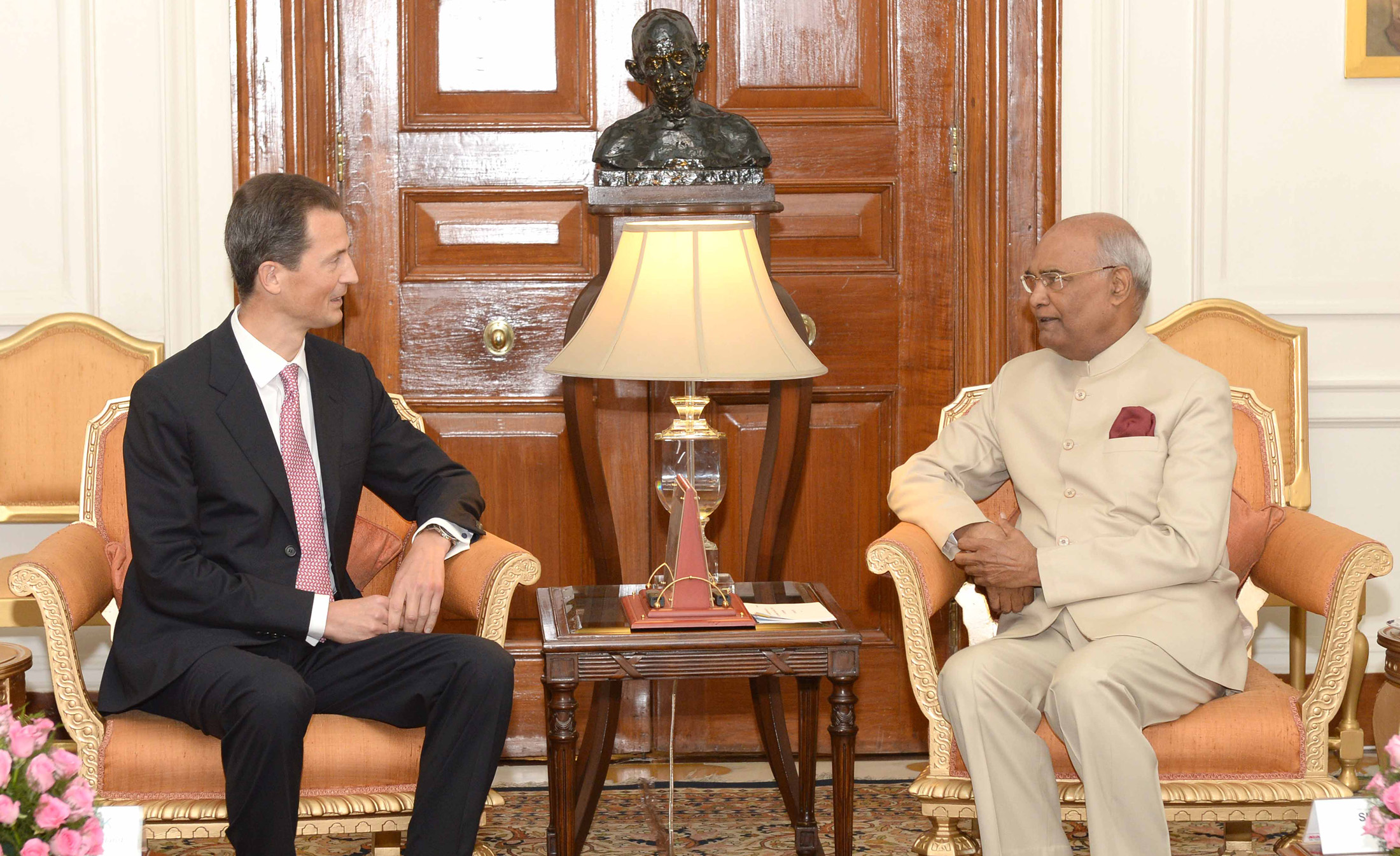
Prince Alois meeting with President Ram Nath Kovind at Rashtrapati Bhavan, New Delhi; October 2018.

India–Liechtenstein relations refers to the bilateral relations between India and Liechtenstein. The Embassy of India in Bern, Switzerland is concurrently accredited to Liechtenstein. Liechtenstein maintains an honorary consul general in New Delhi. Under a 1919 agreement between Liechtenstein and Switzerland, ambassadors and diplomatic missions of Switzerland are authorised to represent Liechtenstein in countries and in diplomatic situations unless Liechtenstein opts to send its own ambassador. Switzerland maintains an embassy in New Delhi and a consulate in Mumbai.

== History ==
Diplomatic relations between India and Liechtenstein were established in 1992–93.

Prince Alois and Princess Sophie, accompanied by an 11-member delegation including the Foreign Minister, visited India on 14–20 November 2010. This was the first high-level visit between the two countries. Prince Hans Adam II had made a private visit to the country a few years earlier. Alois met with President Pratibha Patil, Vice-President Mohammad Hamid Ansari, Finance Minister Pranab Mukherjee, UPA Chairperson Sonia Gandhi, Leader of the Opposition Sushma Swaraj and Minister of State for External Affairs Preneet Kaur. The Liechtensteiner delegation also visited the India International Trade Fair in Delhi. Alois also traveled to Mumbai and met with Maharashtra Governor K. Sankaranarayanan.

Prince Alois and Prince Hans Adam II visited India on 13–19 October 2013 to hold business meetings with Gurgaon-based Savannah Seeds Pvt. Ltd. Minister of State for External Affairs General Vijay Kumar Singh became the first Indian minister to visit Liechtenstein on 18–19 April 2016. He held bilateral discussions with Deputy Prime Minister and Minister for Home Affairs, Justice and Economic Affairs Thomas Zwiefelhofer on 18 April, and Minister of Foreign Affairs, Education and Cultural Affairs Aurelia Frick on 19 April 2016. Singh also met with Prince Alois at Vaduz Castle on 19 April.

== Economic relations ==
Bilateral trade between India and Liechtenstein reached a peak of $5 million in 2008-09 but has declined significantly in the following years. Trade was buoyed by the imports of $4.92 million (mostly of cereals, glass, and electrical machinery and equipment) by Liechtenstein from India in 2008–09. Trade between the two countries totaled $2 million in 2015–16, recording a growth of 47% over the previous fiscal. India exported $820,000 worth of goods to Liechtenstein, and imported $1.18 million. The main commodities exported by India to Liechtenstein are metal alloys, stones, machine tools, mechanical seals, basmati rice, and petroleum products. The major commodities imported by India from Liechtenstein are mechanical appliances and parts, electrical machinery and equipment, dies pigments and other coloring products, glass and glassware, articles made of aluminum and other base metals, and medical, surgical and other precision instruments.

The Liechtenstein Financial Intelligence Unit (FIU) provided support to establish the India Financial Intelligence Unit (FIU), and supported the admission of the latter into the Egmont Group in 2007. India began negotiations with the EFTA, of which Liechtenstein is a member, for a Trade and Investment Agreement (TIA) in January 2012.

In 2008, German tax authorities provided the Indian government with the names of 26 Indian account holders of the LGT Bank in Liechtenstein. Following an investigation, the Indian government informed the Supreme Court on 10 December 2010 that the Income Tax Department had found that 18 of the account holders had evaded taxes by depositing ₹43.83 crore (US$5.2 million) in their LGT Bank accounts. The IT Department issued a total fine of ₹24.26 crore (US$2.9 million) to the 18 account holders. On 4 July 2011, the Supreme Court ordered the Government to disclose the names of all 26 account holders to the public. The Government attempted to stall the Supreme Court order, but eventually disclosed the names of the 18 account holders who had been fined on 29 April 2014. However, the Government refused disclose the names of the remaining 8 account holders against whom no action was taken.

On March 28, 2013, India and Liechtenstein signed a Tax Information Exchange Agreement (TIEA) on 28 March 2013, which came into effect on 20 January 2014. On 21 March 2017, Finance Minister Arun Jaitley informed Parliament that the Government had completed an investigation into account holders in unnamed Liechtenstein banks and had assessed that the holders had ₹6,500 crore (US$770 million) of undeclared income.

India and Liechtenstein signed a free trade agreement in conjunction with the European Free Trade Association in March 2024.

=== Investment ===
Between April 2000 to June 2015, Liechtenstein made $9.5 million of foreign direct investment in India. Several Liechtensteiner firms operate in India, either directly or through subsidiaries. Gurgaon-based hybrid rice developer Savannah Seeds Pvt. Ltd. was founded in October 2010 as the Indian subsidiary of the LGT Group. The LGT Group is wholly owned by Liechtenstein's royal family. The Group's philanthropic investor division, LGT Venture Philanthropy (LGT VP), is also active in India. LGT VP has funded several non-governmental organizations and social enterprises in India through grants, loans or equity investments.

Gujarat-based Hilti Manufacturing India Private Limited is the Indian subsidiary of the Hilti Corporation. Hilti Manufacturing India manufactures diamond cutting/polishing tools and cutting disks. The company acquired Indian firm Bhukhanvala Diamond Systems Private Ltd in 2008. Ivoclar Vivadent operates in India through its wholly owned subsidiary Ivoclar Vivadent (India) Private Ltd, and Umicore's Indian subsidiaries are Umicore Autocat India Pvt. Ltd., Umicore Anandeya India Private Ltd., and Umicore India Private Ltd. Oerlikon Balzers has operational centres in Pune, Gurgaon, Bangalore, Kanchipuram and Jamshedpur. Technology firm Neutrik maintains a network of exclusive distributors in India.

On 7 December 2023, Indian Secretary of Ministry of External Affairs Sanjay Verma visited Liechtenstein and the Hilti company and obtained information about the Liechtenstein financial center from the financial market supervisory authority. He also met with Martin Frick in order to discuss further economic cooperation between India and Liechtenstein.

== Cultural relations ==
The first-ever Indian Film Festival in Liechtenstein was inaugurated by Minister for Foreign Affairs and Culture Aurelia Frick on 16 November 2011 in Vaduz. The India Club in Liechtenstein, with support from the Embassy of India in Bern and under the patronage of Foreign Minister Frick, organized an "India Week in Liechtenstein" on 17–22 May 2016. The India Club in Liechtenstein has organized several other Indian cultural events in Liechtenstein.

Liechtenstein only grants residential permits to foreign citizens who have either a Liechtensteiner or Swiss spouse. As a result, only about 5 Indians reside in Liechtenstein. However, an estimated 50-60 Indians work in Liechtenstein but reside in either Austria or Switzerland, which have simpler requirements for residential permits.
