= Antti Hynninen (diplomat) =

Finnish diplomat

Antti Antero Hynninen (11 November 1940 – 5 September 2017) was a Finnish diplomat and master of political science. He was Ambassador to Cairo in 1987–1989, Ambassador at the Permanent Representation of International Organizations at Geneva in Bern 1989–1995 and then under State Secretary for Trade Policy 1995–1997. He was then Ambassador to Paris 1997–2001 and again to Bern in 2001–2005. He retired in 2005.
