= List of diplomatic missions of the Sovereign Military Order of Malta =

This is a list of diplomatic missions of the Sovereign Military Order of Malta. The Sovereign Military Order of Malta is a sovereign entity of international law that does not have its own territory. It is a permanent non-state observer to the United Nations. It maintains diplomatic relations with over 100 countries. Some of these are hosts of Order of Malta Embassies.

The Order's non-diplomatic country Associations and relief organizations are not listed.

== Current missions ==
=== Africa ===
- Angola
  - Luanda (Embassy)
- Benin
  - Cotonou (Embassy)
- Burkina Faso
  - Ouagadougou (Embassy)
- Burundi
  - Bujumbura (Embassy)
- Cameroon
  - Yaoundé (Embassy)
- Cape Verde
  - Praia (Embassy)
- Chad
  - N'Djamena (Embassy)
- Central African Republic
  - Bangui (Embassy)
- Comoros
  - Moroni (Embassy)
- Congo-Brazzaville
  - Brazzaville (Embassy)
- Congo-Kinshasa
  - Kinshasa (Embassy)
- Egypt
  - Cairo (Embassy)
- Equatorial Guinea
  - Malabo (Embassy)
- Ethiopia
  - Addis Ababa (Embassy)
- Gabon
  - Libreville (Embassy)
- Gambia
  - Banjul (Embassy)
- Guinea
  - Conakry (Embassy)
- Ivory Coast
  - Abidjan (Embassy)
- Kenya
  - Nairobi (Embassy)
- Liberia
  - Monrovia (Embassy)
- Madagascar
  - Antananarivo (Embassy)
- Mali
  - Bamako (Embassy)
- Mauritius
  - Port Louis (Embassy)
- Morocco
  - Rabat (Embassy)
- Mozambique
  - Maputo (Embassy)
- Namibia
  - Windhoek (Embassy)
- Niger
  - Niamey (Embassy)
- São Tomé and Príncipe
  - São Tomé (Embassy)
- Senegal
  - Dakar (Embassy)
- Seychelles
  - Victoria (Embassy)
- Togo
  - Lomé (Embassy)

The Order also has diplomatic relations with Eritrea, Sierra Leone, and Somalia, but no missions are established there.

=== Europe ===
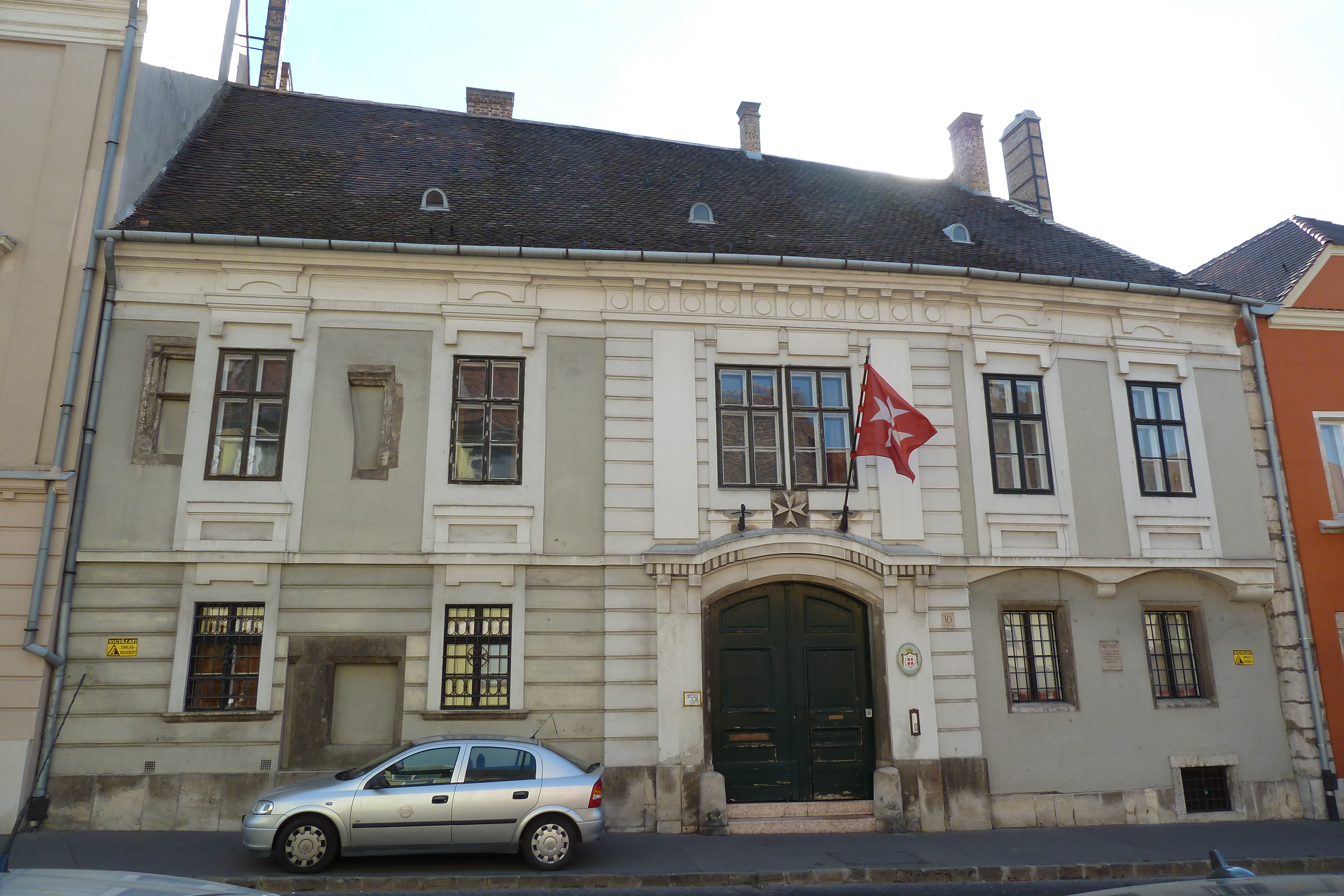
Building hosting the embassy in Budapest

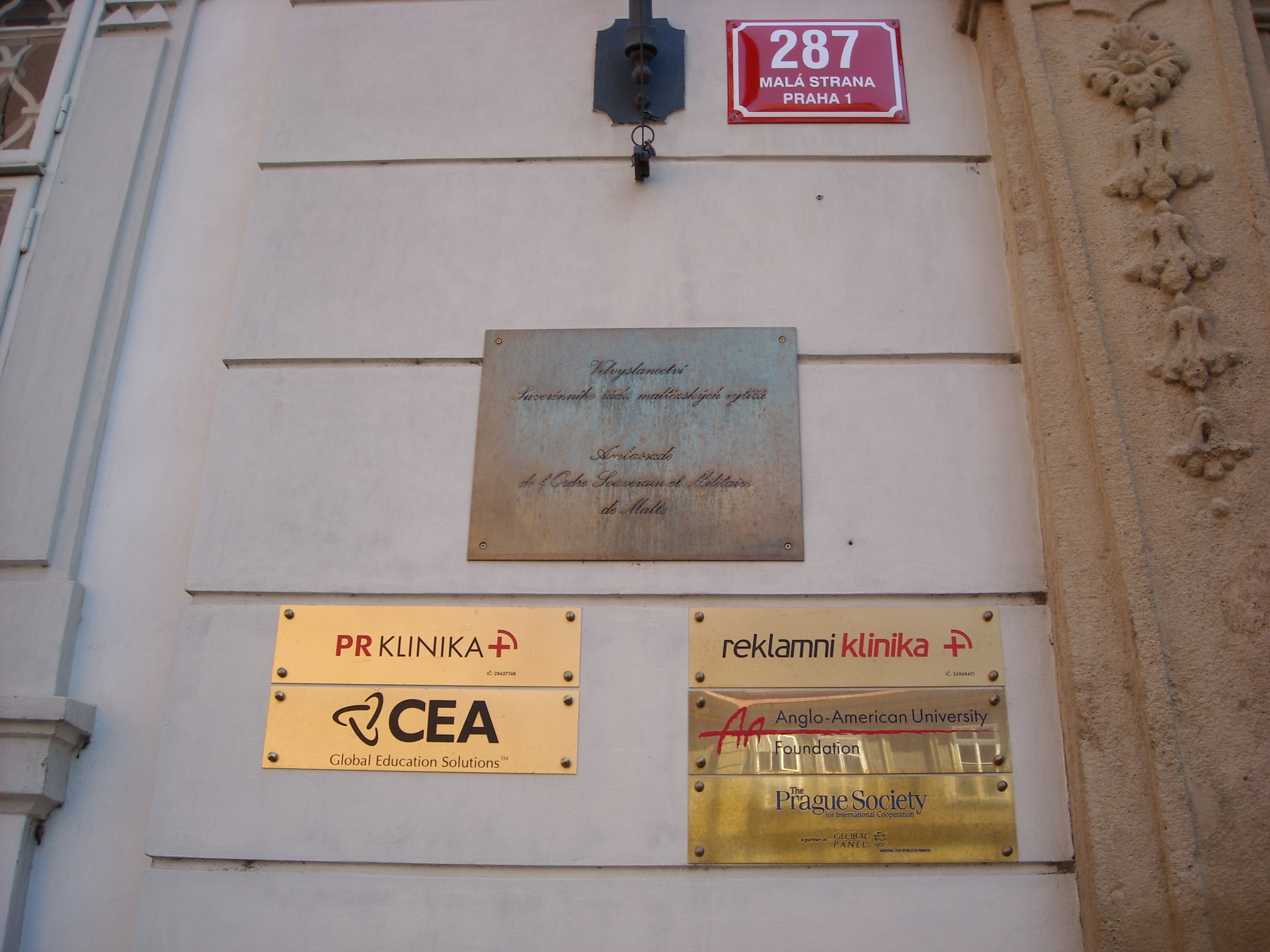
Nameplates on a building in Prague, among them that of the embassy.

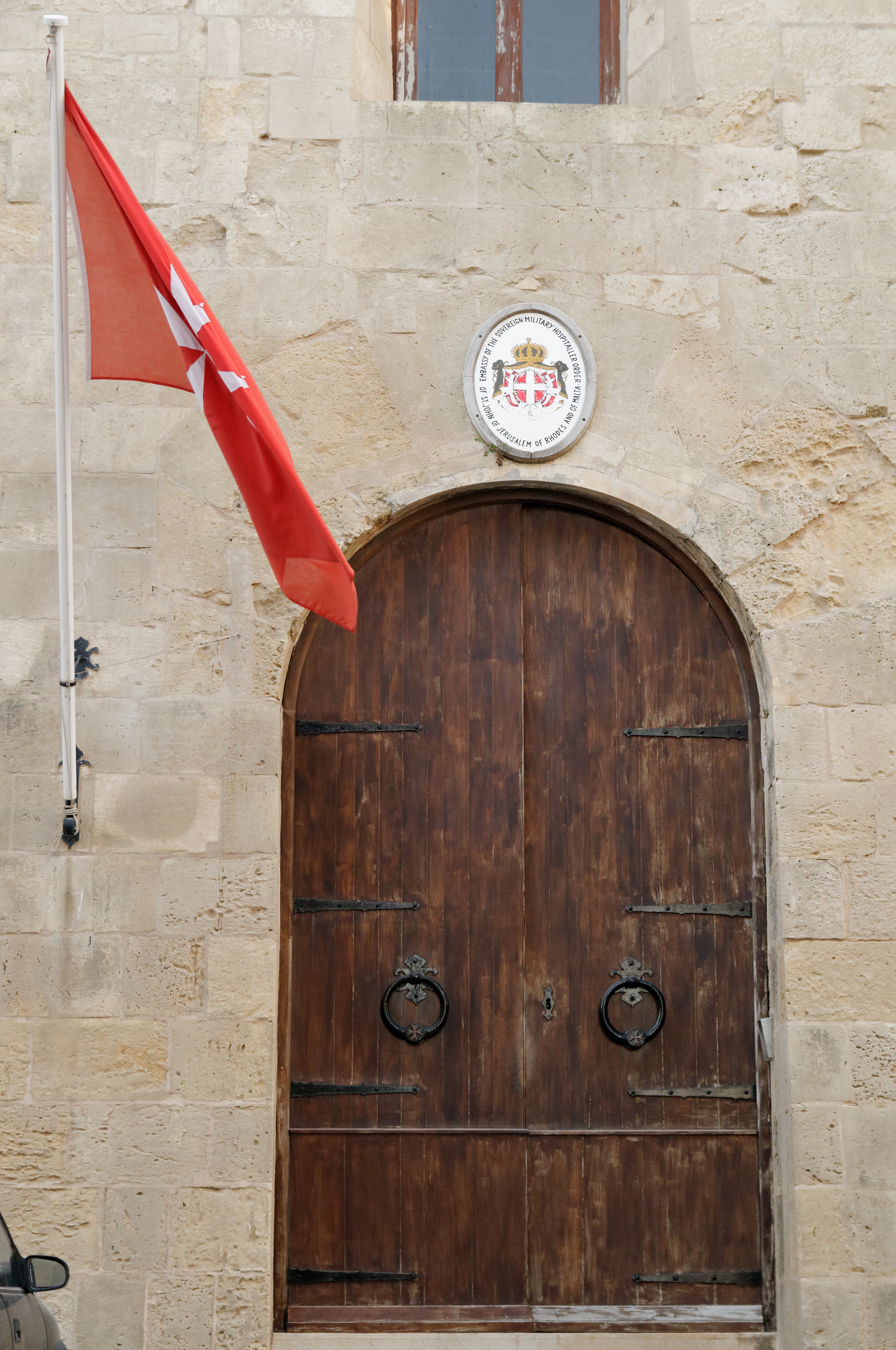
Door of Saint John's Cavalier, embassy in Valletta.

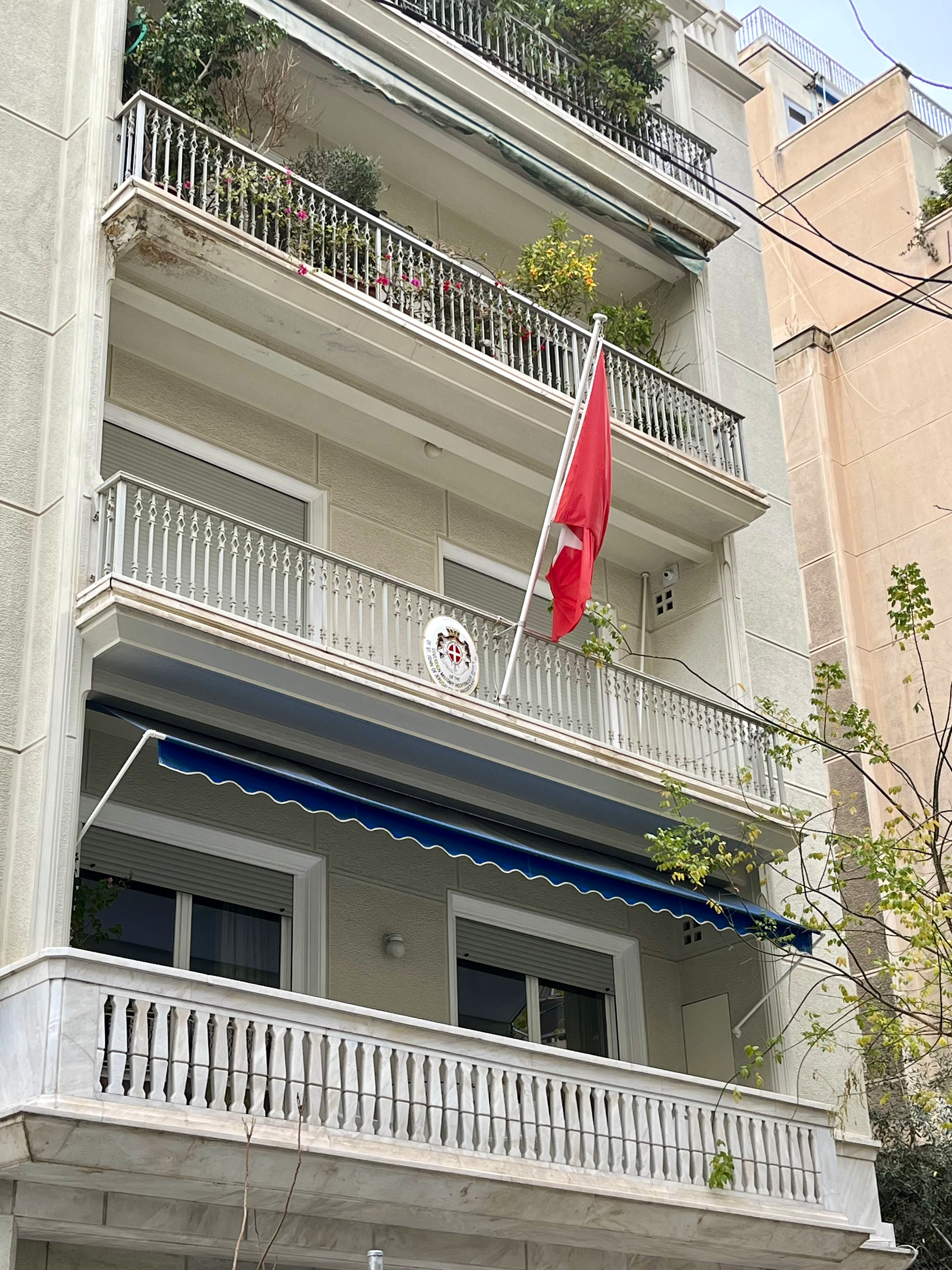
Building housing the embassy in Athens.

- Albania
  - Tirana (Embassy)
- Austria
  - Vienna (Embassy)
- Belarus
  - Minsk (Embassy)
- Belgium
  - Brussels (Delegation)
- Bosnia and Herzegovina
  - Sarajevo (Embassy)
- Bulgaria
  - Sofia (Embassy)
- Croatia
  - Zagreb (Embassy)
- Cyprus
  - Nicosia (Embassy)
- Czechia
  - Prague (Embassy)
- Estonia
  - Tallinn (Embassy)
- France
  - Paris (official representation)
- Germany
  - Berlin (Embassy)
- Greece
  - Athens (Embassy)
- Holy See
  - Rome (Embassy) (Note: The Embassy to the Holy See is located outside Vatican territory in Rome, in the Palazzo Orsini.)
- Hungary
  - Budapest (Embassy)
- Italy
  - Rome (Embassy) (Note: The Embassy is located in the Order's secondary headquarters.)
- Latvia
  - Riga (Embassy)
- Lithuania
  - Vilnius (Embassy)
- Luxembourg
  - Luxembourg City (Delegation)
- Malta
  - Valletta (Embassy)
- Moldova
  - Chişinău (Embassy office)
- Monaco
  - Monaco City (Embassy)
- Montenegro
  - Podgorica (Embassy)
- North Macedonia
  - Skopje (Embassy)
- Poland
  - Warsaw (Embassy)
- Portugal
  - Lisbon (Embassy)
- Romania
  - Bucharest (Embassy)
- Russia
  - Moscow (Special mission)
- San Marino
  - Serravalle (Embassy)
- Serbia
  - Belgrade (Embassy)
- Slovakia
  - Bratislava (Embassy)
- Slovenia
  - Ljubljana (Embassy)
- Spain
  - Madrid (Embassy)
- Switzerland
  - Solothurn (Delegation)
- Ukraine
  - Kyiv (Embassy)

=== America ===
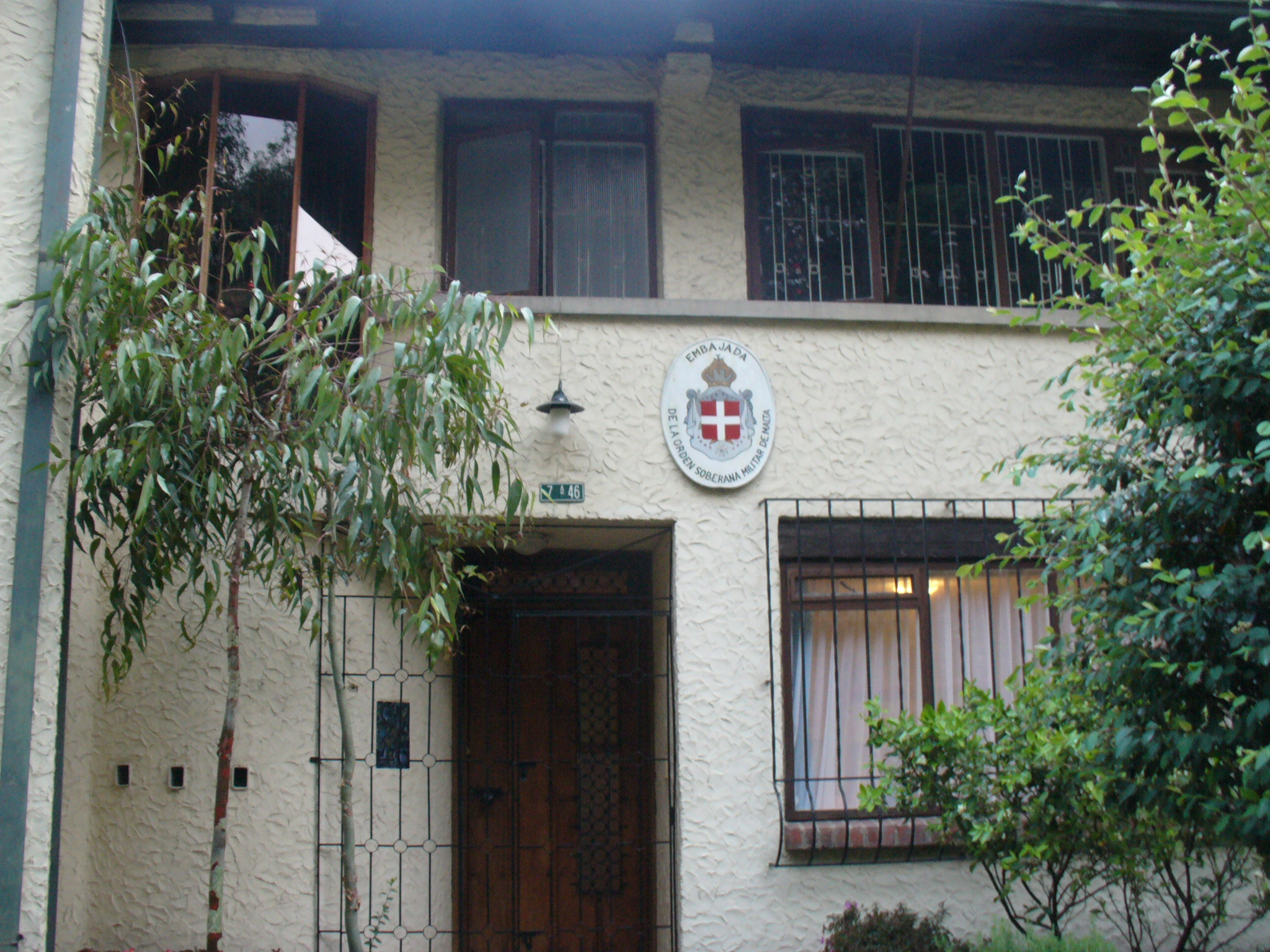
Embassy in Bogotá

- Argentina
  - Buenos Aires (Embassy)
- Bahamas
  - Nassau (Embassy)
- Bolivia
  - La Paz (Embassy)
- Brazil
  - Brasília (Embassy)
- Canada (Note: The Order and Canada conduct official but non-diplomatic relations.)
  - Ottawa (Canadian Association)
- Chile
  - Santiago de Chile (Embassy)
- Colombia
  - Bogotá (Embassy)
- Costa Rica
  - San José (Embassy)
- Cuba
  - Havana (Embassy)
- Dominican Republic
  - Santo Domingo (Embassy)
- Ecuador
  - Quito (Embassy)
- El Salvador
  - San Salvador (Embassy)
- Guatemala
  - Guatemala City (Embassy)
- Haiti
  - Santo Domingo (Embassy)
- Honduras
  - Tegucigalpa (Embassy)
- Panama
  - Panama City (Embassy)
- Paraguay
  - Asunción (Embassy)
- Peru
  - Lima (Embassy)
- Saint Vincent and the Grenadines
  - Kingstown (Embassy)
- Suriname
  - Paramaribo (Embassy)
- United States
  - Washington, D.C. (Liaison Office)
- Uruguay
  - Montevideo (Embassy)
- Venezuela
  - Caracas (Embassy)

The Order also has diplomatic relations with Antigua and Barbuda, Belize, Grenada, and Guyana but no mission is established there.

=== Asia ===
- Armenia
  - Yerevan (Embassy)
- Cambodia
  - Phnom Penh (Embassy)
- Georgia
  - Tbilisi (Embassy)
- Jordan
  - Amman (Embassy)
- Kazakhstan
  - Astana (Embassy)
- Lebanon
  - Beirut (Embassy)
- Palestine
  - Bethlehem (Representation office)
- Philippines
  - Manila (Embassy)
- Thailand
  - Bangkok (Embassy)
- Timor-Leste
  - Dili (Embassy)

The Order also has diplomatic relations with Afghanistan, Tajikistan, and Turkmenistan, but no missions are established there.

=== Oceania ===
The Order also has diplomatic relations with Kiribati, Marshall Islands, the Micronesia, and Nauru but no missions are established there.

=== Multilateral organizations ===
- European Union
  - Brussels (Permanent Mission)
- New York City (Permanent Mission to the United Nations)
- Permanent Observer Mission to the United Nations, IAEA and CTBTO in Vienna
- Geneva (Permanent Missions to the United Nations and other international organizations))
- International Committee of the Red Cross
  - Geneva (delegation)
- Paris (Permanent Missions to the UNESCO and other international organizations)
- Rome (Permanent Missions to FAO and other international organizations)
- Nairobi (Permanent Mission to UNEP)
- Strasbourg (Delegation to the Council of Europe)
- Washington, D.C. (Delegation to the Organization of American States and other international organizations)
- Brussels (Delegation to the International Committee of Military Medicine)

== Closed missions ==
=== Africa ===
Host country	Host city	Mission	Year closed	Ref.
Sudan	Khartoum	Embassy	2022	

== See also ==
- Accreditations and diplomatic relations of the Sovereign Military Order of Malta
- List of diplomatic missions to the Sovereign Military Order of Malta
- Foreign relations of the Sovereign Military Order of Malta
- Robert L. Shafer
