= List of diplomatic missions to the Sovereign Military Order of Malta =

Lists Of Diplomatic Missions

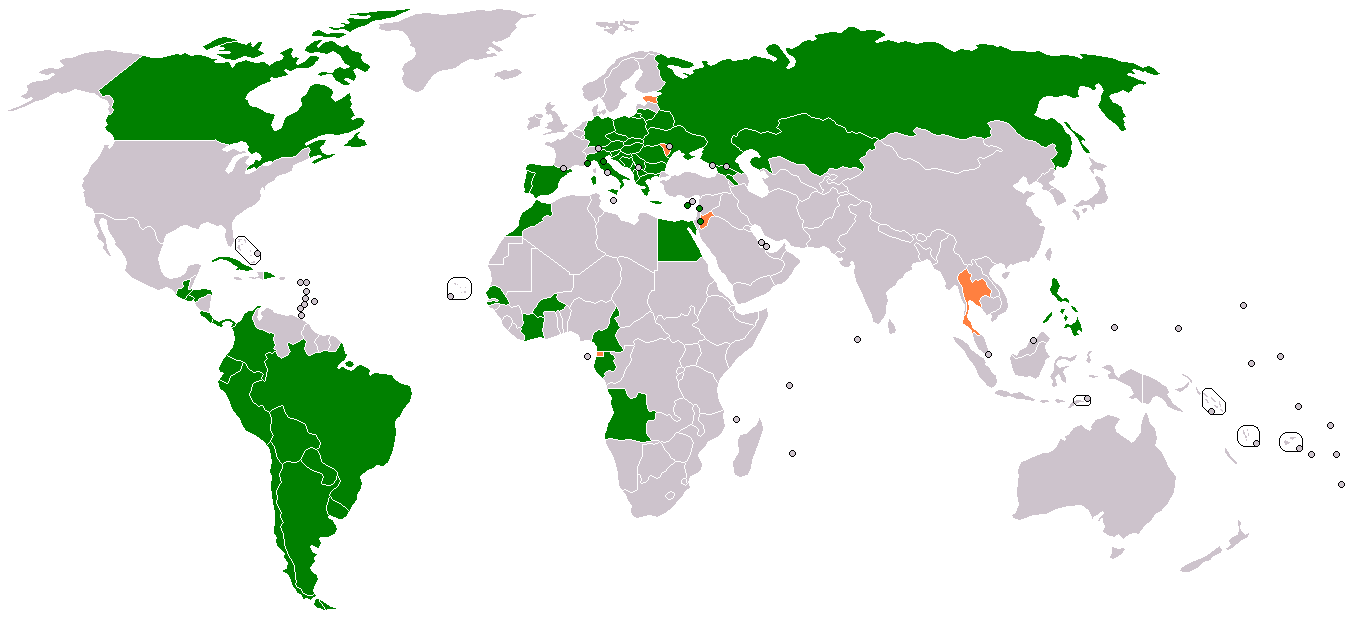
Countries with resident embassy in Rome accredited to the Holy See Countries with resident embassy in Rome accredited to Italy

This article lists diplomatic missions accredited to the Sovereign Military Order of Malta. The Order does not have its own territory and its sovereign extraterritorial headquarters, Villa del Priorato di Malta and Palazzo Malta, are located in Rome; therefore many countries accredit their Rome-based ambassadors to the Holy See additionally to the Order of Malta.

== Accredited Missions Resident in Rome, Italy ==
=== Embassies/Delegations to the Holy See ===
1. Albania
2. Angola
3. Argentina
4. Armenia
5. Austria
6. Belarus
7. Brazil
8. Bolivia
9. Bosnia and Herzegovina
10. Bulgaria
11. Burkina Faso
12. Cameroon
13. Canada (Note: The Canadian embassy to the Holy See handles official but non-diplomatic relations with the Order of Malta.)
14. Chile
15. Colombia
16. Costa Rica
17. Croatia
18. Cuba
19. Cyprus
20. Czechia
21. Dominican Republic
22. Ecuador
23. Egypt
24. El Salvador
25. European Union
26. Gabon
27. Georgia
28. Germany
29. Greece
30. Guatemala
31. Honduras
32. Hungary
33. Italy
34. Ivory Coast
35. Kazakhstan
36. Lebanon
37. Lithuania
38. Monaco
39. Montenegro
40. Morocco
41. North Macedonia
42. Palestine
43. Panama
44. Paraguay
45. Peru
46. Philippines
47. Poland
48. Portugal
49. Romania
50. Russia
51. San Marino
52. Senegal
53. Serbia
54. Slovakia
55. Slovenia
56. Spain
57. Ukraine
58. Uruguay

=== Embassies to Italy ===
1. Equatorial Guinea
2. Estonia
3. Jordan
4. Moldova
5. Thailand

== Resident outside of Rome ==
=== Resident in London, United Kingdom ===
1. Gambia
2. Liberia
3. Namibia

=== Resident in other cities ===
1. Andorra (Andorra la Vella) (Note: The ambassador is based in the headquarters of the Andorran foreign ministry, in Andorra la Vella.)
2. Cape Verde (Lisbon)
3. Central African Republic (Paris)
4. Holy See (Vatican City) (Note: The Holy See's representative is the Cardinalis Patronus, who is based in the Vatican City.)
5. Latvia (Riga) (Note: The ambassador is based in the headquarters of the Latvian foreign ministry, in Riga.)
6. Malta (Valletta) (Note: The ambassador is based in the headquarters of the Maltese foreign ministry, in Valletta.)
7. Seychelles (Brussels)

== Unconfirmed ==
- Mali (Paris)

== See also ==
- Foreign relations of the Sovereign Military Order of Malta
- List of diplomatic missions of the Sovereign Military Order of Malta
