= Sovereign Military Order of Malta–European Union relations =

- Sovereign Military Order of Malta: European Union

Diplomatic mission
- Official Representation of the Sovereign Order of Malta to the European Union, Brussels: Delegation of the European Union to the Holy See, Order of Malta, UN Organisations in Rome and to the Republic of San Marino, Rome

Envoy
- Ambassador Yves Gazzo: Ambassador Jan Tombiński

Sovereign Military Order of Malta–European Union relations are the diplomatic relations between the Sovereign Military Order of Malta (SMOM) and the European Union (EU). They were formally established in 2003 when the SMOM established a representation and office in Brussels, having been in contact with the European Commission since the early 1990s.

== Representation and recognition ==
Unique among Europe's religious orders, SMOM representation is recognised as a diplomatic entity solely by the Commission and not the EU's other institutions or member states. This arrangement was formalised in 2007, when the EU's Delegation to the Holy See, established in 2006, had its remit extended to cover the SMOM.

== Cooperation ==
The SMOM has declared the intention of its multilateral relations, such as those with the EU, to promote humanitarian values including "human rights, healthcare [and] food security". Similarly, the EU perceives its diplomacy with the SMOM to be valuable "in the fields of emergency relief, medical care, [the] fight against poverty and famine, and special assistance to people affected by conflicts". From 6 March 2012, the two parties have further collaborated to strategise the protection of "sacred places" in the Mediterranean, assisted by the Bureau of European Policy Advisers (BEPA).

== See also ==
- Holy See–European Union relations
- List of permanent observers of the Sovereign Military Order of Malta to the United Nations
