= Foreign relations of the Sovereign Military Order of Malta =

Sovereign entity maintaining diplomatic relations worldwide

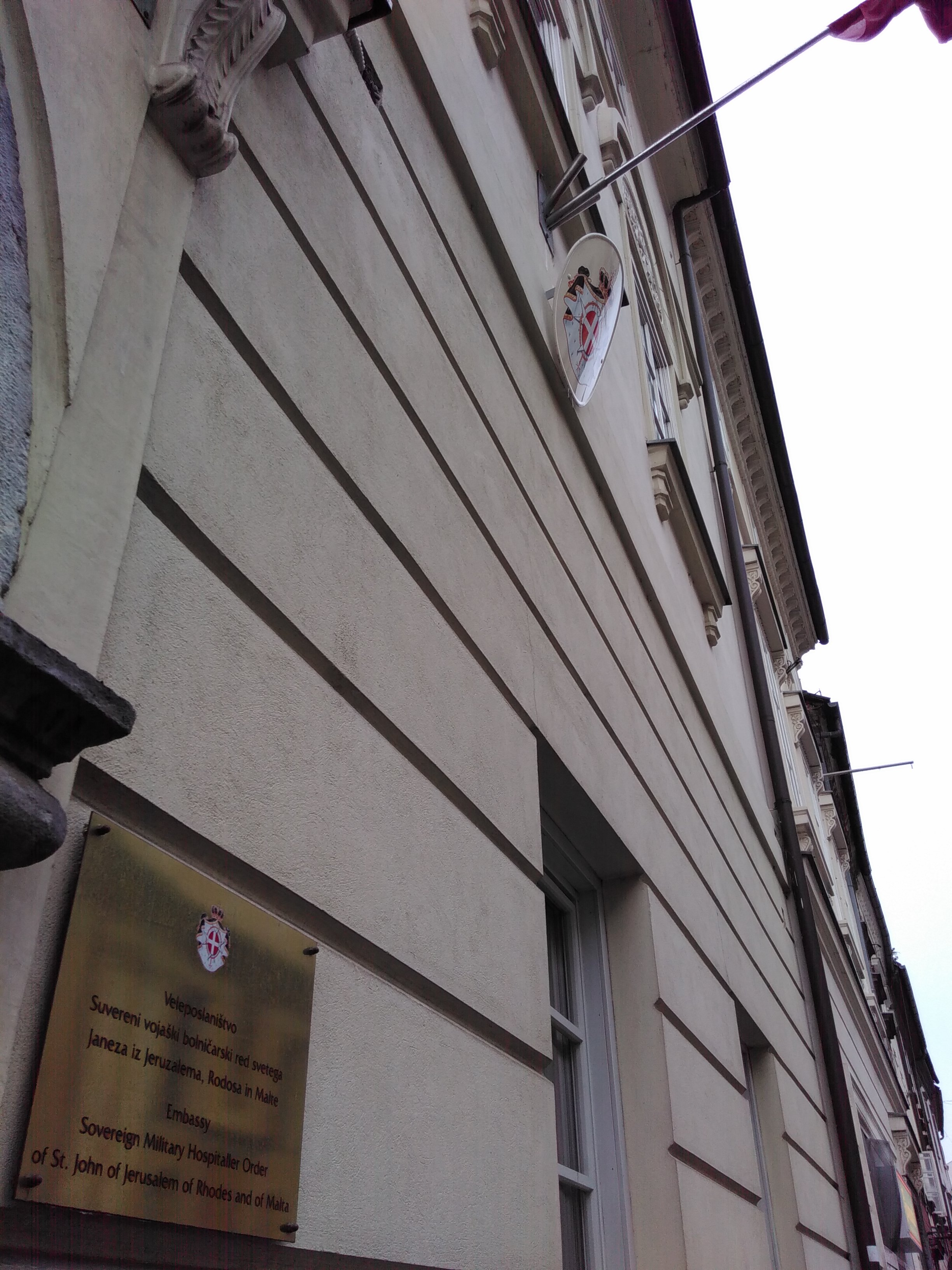
Embassy of the Sovereign Military Order of Malta in Ljubljana, Slovenia

The Sovereign Military Order of Malta (SMOM) is a sovereign entity maintaining diplomatic relations with 115 sovereign states (including the Holy See). Additionally, it has observer status or representation at multiple intergovernmental organisations. The Order has non-diplomatic official relations with seven more states: France, Belgium, Switzerland, Luxembourg, Canada, United Kingdom and Taiwan. The Order exchanges ambassadors with the European Union and the State of Palestine.

== Bilateral relations ==
=== Diplomatic relations ===
The Sovereign Military Order of Malta maintains diplomatic relations with 117 United Nations members and the Holy See. It has moreover signed Declarations of Intent with Saint Kitts and Nevis (September 2025), Vanuatu (September 2025), Palau (January 2026), Eswatini (September 2026) and Tuvalu (September 2026) in preparation for establishing diplomatic relations.

#	Country	Date
—	Holy See	February 1930
1	Romania	December 1932
2	Spain	19 November 1938
3	Haiti	1947
4	Panama	2 August 1948
5	Argentina	7 June 1951
6	Brazil	6 December 1951
7	El Salvador	1951
8	Colombia	28 January 1953
9	Peru	15 April 1953
10	Ecuador (Note: On 10 February 2012, President Rafael Correa issued a decree to withdraw recognition and initiate the process of cancelling relations. Later on, the relations were restored by President Lenín Moreno on 24 September 2019.)	29 July 1953
11	Chile	24 February 1956
12	Italy (Note: The Supreme Court of Cassation decreed on 6 June 1974 that, "the Sovereign Military Hospitaller Order of Malta constitutes a sovereign international subject, in all terms equal, even if without territory, to a foreign state with which Italy has normal diplomatic relations, so there is no doubt, as already this Supreme Court has warned, that it has the legal treatment of foreign states". As Italy recognizes, in addition to extraterritoriality, the exercise by SMOM of all the prerogatives of sovereignty in its headquarters, Italian sovereignty and SMOM sovereignty uniquely coexist without overlapping.)	12 June 1956
13	Lebanon	1956
14	Costa Rica	8 August 1957
15	Nicaragua	12 September 1957
16	Austria	6 December 1957
17	Dominican Republic	1957
18	Paraguay	10 January 1958
19	Guatemala	23 June 1959
20	Cuba	29 July 1959
21	Honduras	1959
22	Liberia	1959
23	Cameroon	4 July 1961
24	Somalia	28 November 1961
25	Bolivia	15 June 1962
26	Portugal	19 December 1962
27	Gabon	1963
28	Philippines	24 April 1965
29	Uruguay	1 July 1965
30	Senegal	1965
31	Malta	27 June 1966
32	Venezuela	3 August 1970
33	Niger	9 January 1971
34	Ethiopia	February 1971
35	Benin	1972
36	Ivory Coast	1972
37	Togo	5 September 1973
38	Burkina Faso	1973
39	Mauritania	3 March 1977
40	Mauritius	18 July 1978
41	Egypt	1980
42	Central African Republic	1981
43	Comoros	1981
44	Thailand	4 September 1984
45	Democratic Republic of the Congo	1984
46	San Marino (Note: Official relations between SMOM and San Marino were established on 23 June 1935; the treaty establishing relations described the parties as "due Stati" ("two States"). These ties were elevated to diplomatic relations on 4 March 1986.)	4 March 1986
47	Guinea	24 June 1986
48	Morocco	4 December 1986
49	Mali	1986
50	Chad	1989
51	Czech Republic	8 June 1990
52	Hungary	15 June 1990
53	Poland	9 July 1990
54	Madagascar	1990
55	Lithuania	9 July 1992
56	Slovenia	15 July 1992
57	Russia	7 August 1992
58	Croatia	22 December 1992
59	Republic of the Congo	1992
60	Cambodia	1992
61	Sudan	1992
62	Slovakia	1 January 1993
63	Seychelles	7 June 1994
64	Albania	14 July 1994
65	Liechtenstein	7 November 1994
66	Bulgaria	11 November 1994
67	Latvia	15 August 1995
68	Belarus	30 April 1996
69	North Macedonia	12 July 1996
70	Equatorial Guinea	16 July 1996
71	Cape Verde	1996
72	Bosnia and Herzegovina	31 January 1997
73	Saint Vincent and the Grenadines	February 1997
74	Federated States of Micronesia	12 November 1997
75	Guinea-Bissau	1997
76	Mozambique	1997
77	São Tomé and Príncipe	1997
78	Armenia	29 May 1998
79	Georgia	24 July 1998
80	Suriname	30 April 1999
81	Guyana	19 May 1999
82	Eritrea	1999
83	Saint Lucia	1999
84	Belize	1999
85	Afghanistan	1999
86	Kazakhstan	26 April 2001
87	Moldova	5 May 2001
88	Serbia	11 May 2001
89	Tajikistan	1 June 2001
90	Marshall Islands	3 May 2002
91	Kiribati	2002
92	Jordan	29 June 2003
93	Angola	13 December 2005
94	Montenegro	5 September 2006
95	Timor-Leste	18 September 2006
96	Kenya	14 September 2007
97	Monaco	18 October 2007
98	Turkmenistan	30 October 2007
99	Ukraine	9 February 2008
100	Bahamas	11 November 2008
101	Sierra Leone	28 November 2008
102	Namibia	31 March 2009
103	Antigua and Barbuda	20 October 2009
104	Cyprus	6 June 2012
105	South Sudan	14 November 2014
106	Grenada	6 November 2015
107	Germany	15 November 2017
108	Nauru	5 October 2018
109	Estonia	11 March 2020
110	Greece	2 December 2021
111	Lesotho	7 December 2021
112	Gambia	20 September 2023
113	Burundi	25 October 2024
114	Andorra	16 June 2025
115	Zimbabwe	23 September 2026
116	Malawi	25 September 2026
117	Zambia	25 September 2026

== Other countries ==
#	Name	Diplomatic relations established	Notes
–	European Union	1987	Ambassador level relations.
–	Palestinian Authority		Ambassador level relations.

=== Official relations ===
Name	Official relations established	Region	Notes
Belgium	1960	Europe	
Switzerland	1960	Europe	
France	1982	Europe	France does not recognise the SMOM as a subject of international law.
Luxembourg	1995	Europe	
Canada	4 June 2008	North America	Canada established official relations in June 2008, with its Ambassador to the Holy See accredited to the Order of Malta.
United Kingdom	9 October 2024	Europe	The Sovereign Military Order of Malta established official relations with the United Kingdom on 9 October 2024.
Taiwan		Asia	The Order of Malta has official relations with Taiwan through the Embassy of the Republic of China to the Holy See in Rome (Italy).

=== Unofficial relations ===
#	Name	Region	Notes
–	Netherlands	Europe	Recognises it as a knightly order
–	Mongolia	Asia	Accepts its stamps

== Intergovernmental organizations ==
The Order of Malta has observer status at the following organizations:

Organization	observer since	Notes
United Nations Educational, Scientific and Cultural Organization		
Food and Agricultural Organization of the United Nations		
International Atomic Energy Agency		
United Nations General Assembly		
International Fund for Agricultural Development		
United Nations Economic and Social Commission for Asia and the Pacific		
United Nations Environment Programme		
United Nations High Commissioner for Human Rights		
United Nations High Commissioner for Refugees		
United Nations Industrial Development Organization		
World Food Programme		
World Health Organization		

The Order of Malta has delegations or representations to the following organizations:

Organization	participates since	Notes
Council of Europe		
International Institute for the Unification of Private Law		
Comprehensive Nuclear-Test-Ban Treaty Organization Preparatory Commission		
Inter-American Development Bank		
International Centre for the Study of the Preservation and Restoration of Cultural Property		
International Committee of Military Medicine		
International Committee of the Red Cross		
International Federation of Red Cross and Red Crescent Societies		
International Institute of Humanitarian Law		
International Organization for Migration		
Latin Union		

== See also ==
- List of diplomatic missions of the Sovereign Military Order of Malta
- List of diplomatic missions to the Sovereign Military Order of Malta
- List of permanent observers of the Sovereign Military Order of Malta to the United Nations
