= Embassy of the Sovereign Military Order of Malta, Berlin =

Diplomatic mission of Malta (S.M.O.) to Germany

Embassy of the Sovereign Military Order of Malta in Germany
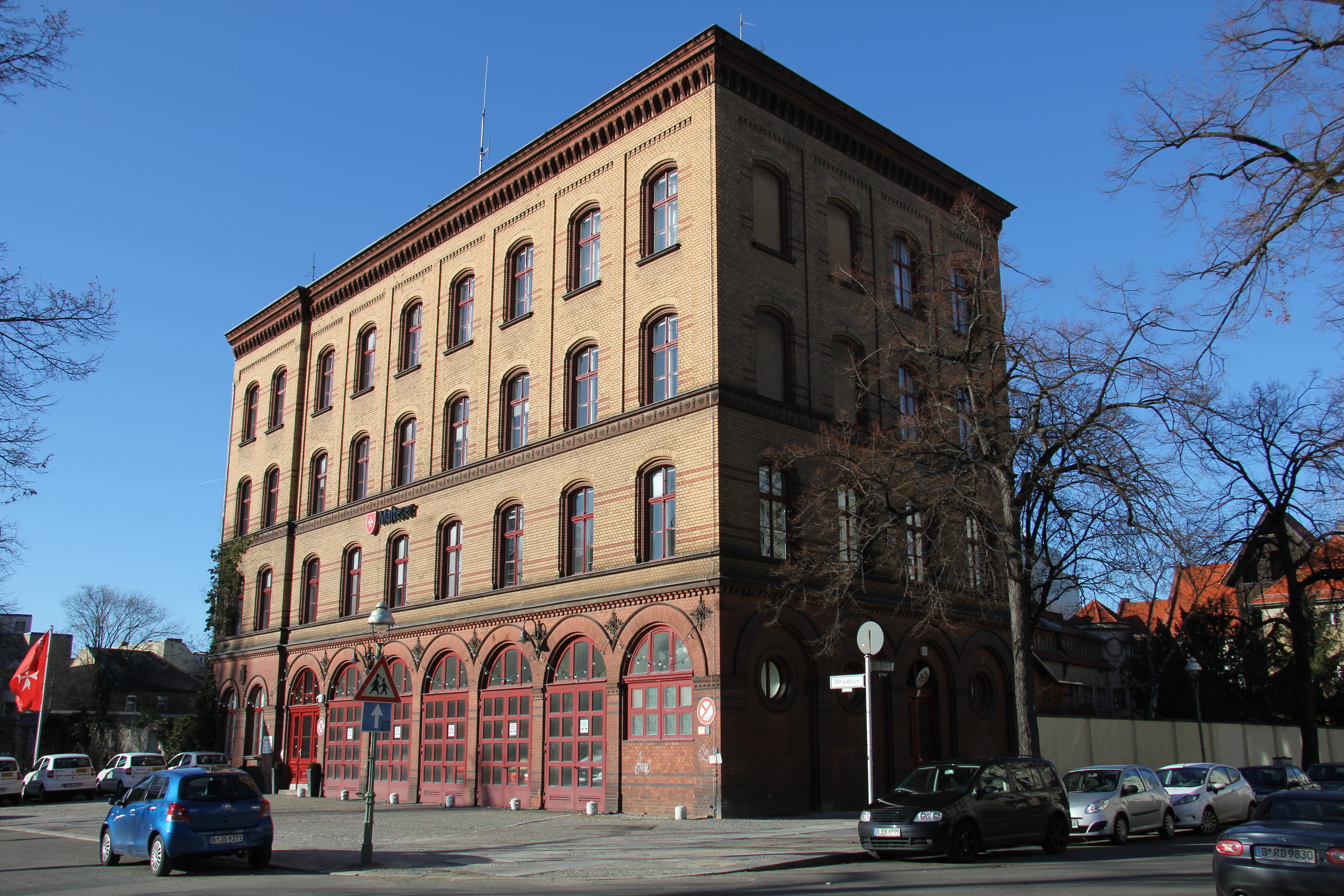
- Location: Feuerwache Alt-Lietzow
- Address: Lüdgeweg 1, Charlottenburg, Berlin, Germany

The Embassy of the Sovereign Military Order of Malta in Germany represents the permanent diplomatic mission of the Sovereign Military Order of Malta in the Federal Republic of Germany. The chancery is located at Lüdgeweg 1, Berlin-Charlottenburg, Germany.

== History ==
A representation opened in October 2001, under ambassador Augustin Freiherr d'Aboville. Diplomatic relations were later officially established on 15 December 2017. Germany is represented to Sovereign Military Order of Malta through its Embassy to the Holy See.

== List of representatives ==
Ambassador	Start time	End time	Grand Master	Notes
2001: Representative mission opened
Augustin Freiherr d'Aboville	October 2001	2017?	Andrew Bertie	As official delegate.
2017: Formal establishment of diplomatic relations
Maciej Heydel	2018	2023	Giacomo dalla Torre	Former State Secretary in the Polish Ministry of Finance. Accredited on January 8, 2018.
Vinciane Gräfin von Westphalen	2023	Incumbent	John T. Dunlap	Born in Paris on May 30, 1968. Accredited on October 25, 2023.

== See also ==
- Foreign relations of Germany
- Foreign relations of the Sovereign Military Order of Malta
- Germany–Holy See relations
