= Robert L. Shafer =

Robert L. Shafer (born May 10, 1932) is an American lawyer, lobbyist, and diplomat. From 2004 to 2015 he was the Permanent Observer for the Sovereign Military Order of Malta at the United Nations in New York City.

== Biography ==
Shafer was born in Amery, Wisconsin and received a B.A. degree from St. John's University in Collegeville, Minnesota and a J.D. degree from Georgetown University.

Shafer was employed at Pfizer for over 30 years and was Vice-president of Public Affairs and Government Relations of the corporation when he retired in 1996. As a representative of Pfizer, he lobbied the U.S. Congress and the governments of other countries where Pfizer had subsidiary corporations.

On June 8, 2004, Shafer succeeded Jose Antonio Linati Bosch as the Sovereign Military Order of Malta's Permanent Observer at the UN, serving until 2015. Shafer has also been the Chairman of the Convent of the Sacred Heart in Greenwich, Connecticut; the director or member of the board of a number of mutual fund corporations; and a member of the Board of Regents of St. John's University.

== See also ==
- List of permanent observers of the Sovereign Military Order of Malta to the United Nations
