= List of diplomatic missions to the Holy See =

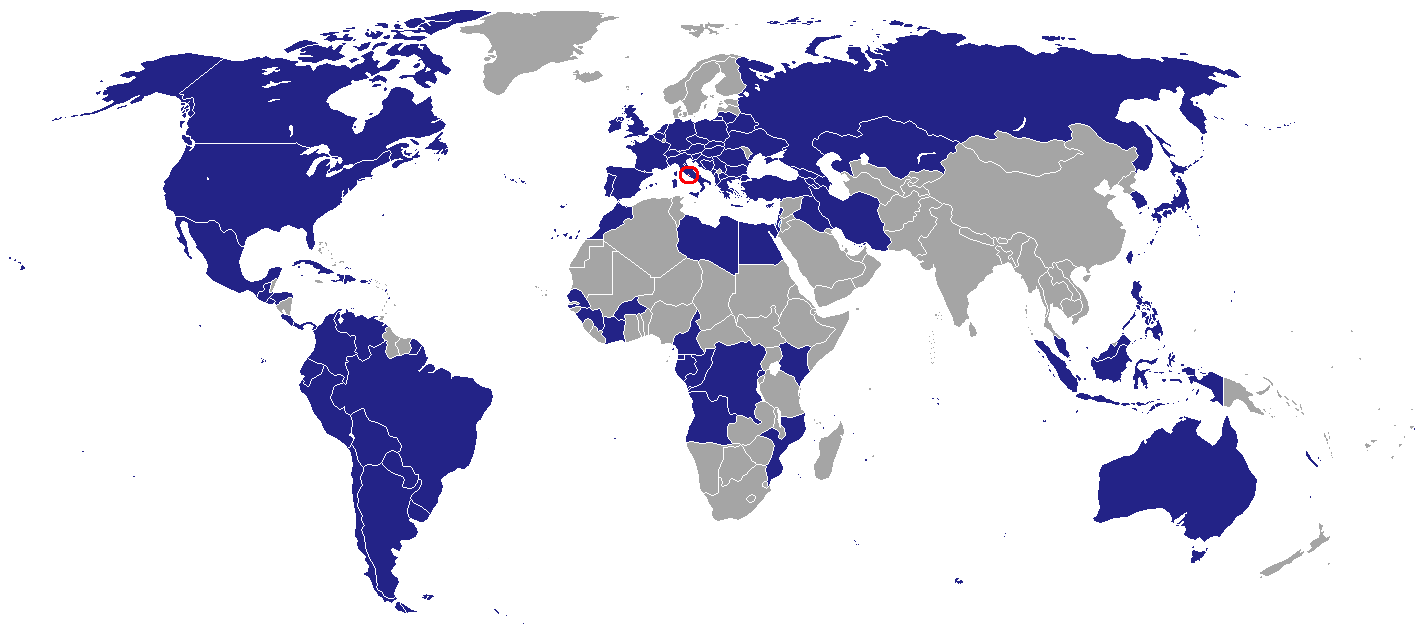
Diplomatic missions to the Holy See Holy See Countries with embassies to the Holy See based in Rome

This article lists diplomatic missions accredited to the Holy See, the government of the Catholic Church and the temporal ruler of the Vatican City. 89 countries currently maintain embassies to the Holy See.

The Vatican City State, over which the Holy See is sovereign, is the smallest independent entity in the world and its size renders any resident diplomatic community impractical. Therefore, all embassies to the Holy See are located in Rome, making the Vatican City one of only two sovereign states, the other being Liechtenstein, with no resident embassies located within its territory. This leads to the situation that Italy's embassy to the Holy See is based on its home territory, which is also the case for Andorra, Dominica, Estonia, Latvia, Liechtenstein, Malta, and Singapore. This also means that the Embassy of the Republic of China (more commonly known as Taiwan) to the Holy See is located in Italy, which does not recognize the Republic of China.

Embassies to the Holy See usually do not maintain consular sections, allowing their sending countries' embassies to Italy to provide services to those holding passports issued by the Holy See. A notable exception is that of the Philippines, whose consular section caters to the Filipino pilgrims to Catholic pilgrimage sites in Italy and the Filipino members of religious congregations.

== Diplomatic missions in Rome ==
=== Embassies ===
1. Albania
2. Angola
3. Argentina
4. Armenia
5. Australia
6. Austria
7. Azerbaijan
8. Belarus
9. Belgium
10. Bolivia
11. Bosnia and Herzegovina
12. Brazil
13. Bulgaria
14. Burkina Faso
15. Burundi
16. Cameroon
17. Canada
18. Chile
19. Colombia
20. Congo-Brazzaville
21. Congo-Kinshasa
22. Costa Rica
23. Croatia
24. Cuba
25. Cyprus
26. Czech Republic
27. Dominican Republic
28. Ecuador
29. Egypt
30. El Salvador
31. Equatorial Guinea
32. France
33. Gabon
34. Georgia
35. Germany
36. Ghana
37. Greece
38. Guatemala
39. Haiti
40. Honduras
41. Hungary
42. Indonesia
43. Iran
44. Iraq
45. Ireland
46. Israel
47. Italy
48. Ivory Coast
49. Japan
50. Kazakhstan
51. Kenya
52. Lebanon
53. Libya
54. Lithuania
55. Malaysia
56. Mexico
57. Monaco
58. Montenegro
59. Morocco
60. Mozambique
61. Netherlands (article)
62. Nigeria
63. North Macedonia
64. Palestine
65. Panama
66. Paraguay
67. Peru
68. Philippines
69. Poland
70. Portugal
71. Republic of China (Taiwan)
72. Romania
73. Russia
74. San Marino
75. Senegal
76. Serbia
77. Slovakia
78. Slovenia
79. South Korea
80. Sovereign Military Order of Malta
81. Spain
82. Switzerland
83. Timor-Leste
84. Turkey
85. Ukraine
86. United Kingdom
87. United States
88. Uruguay
89. Venezuela

=== Other delegations or representations ===
1. Arab League (Delegation)
2. European Union (Delegation)

=== Gallery ===
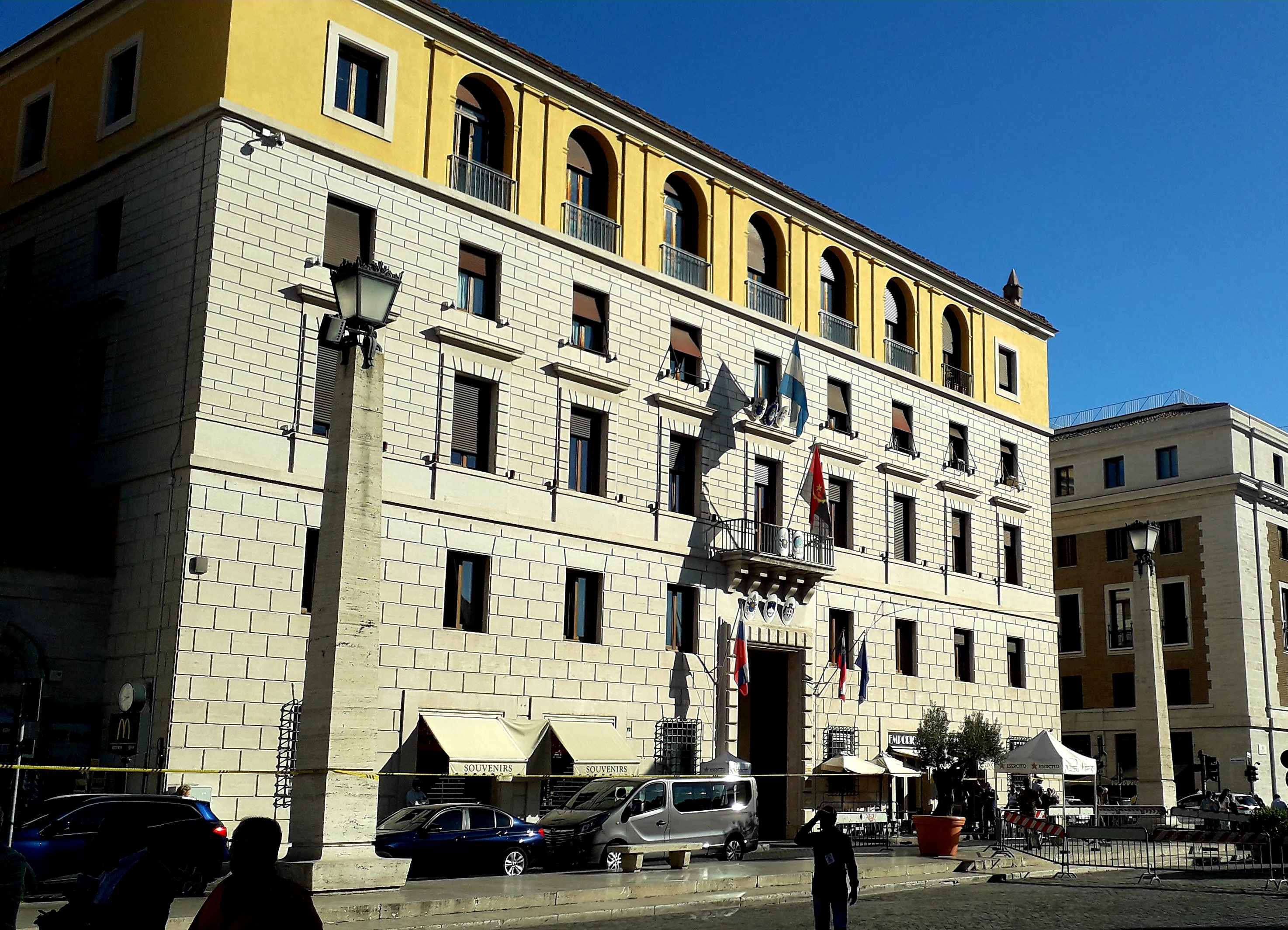
Embassies of Angola, Russia and Slovenia

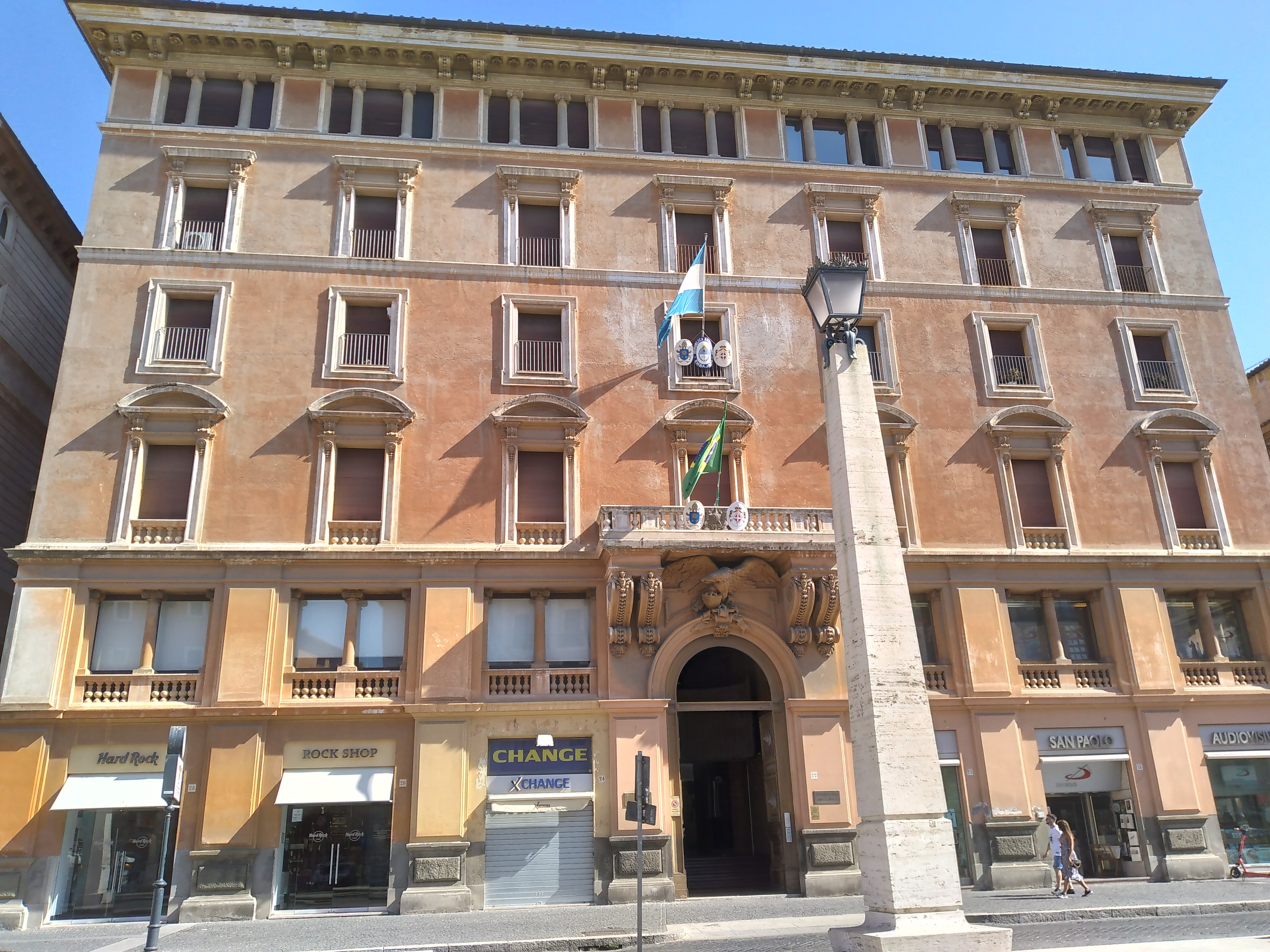
Embassies of Argentina and Brazil

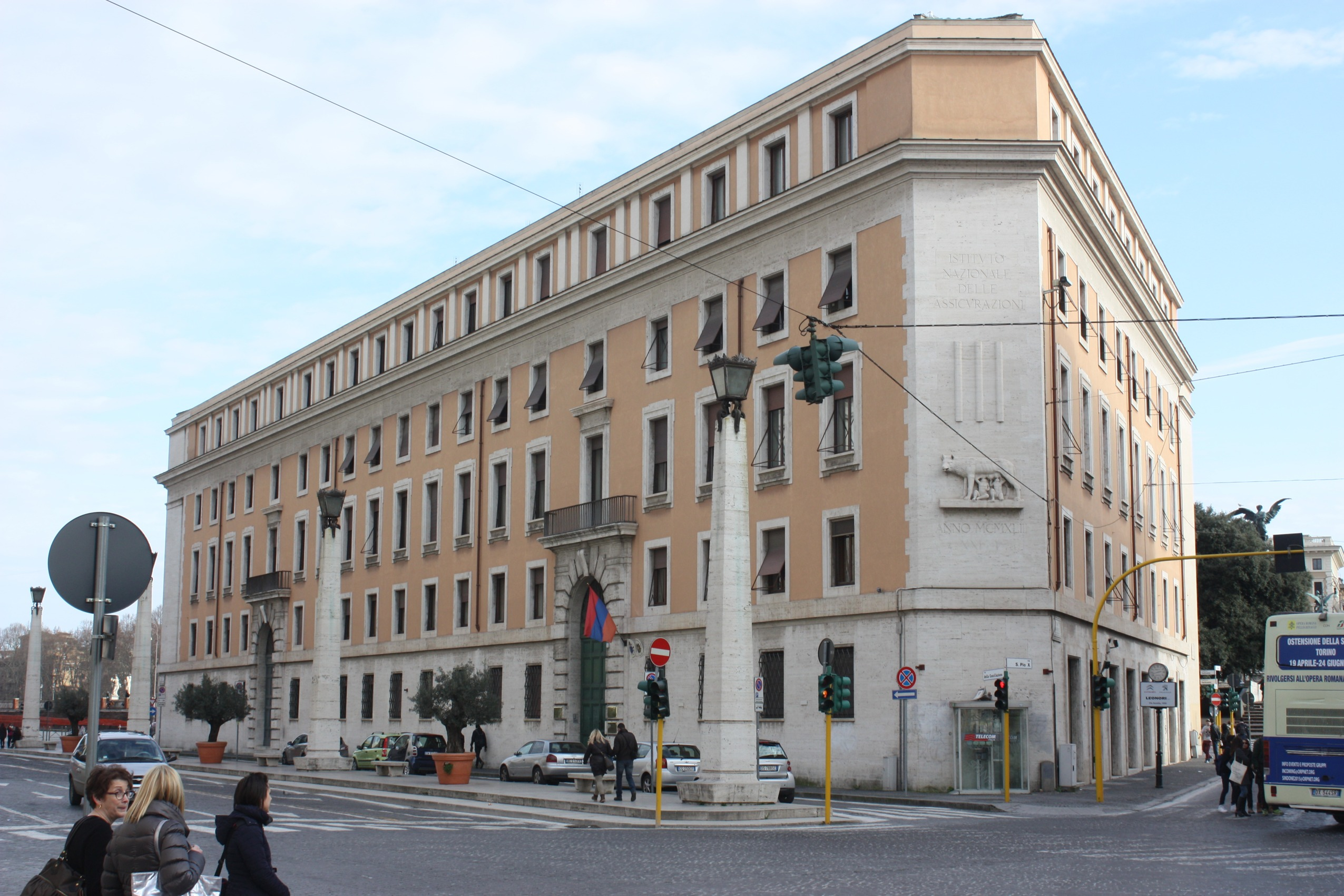
Embassy of Armenia

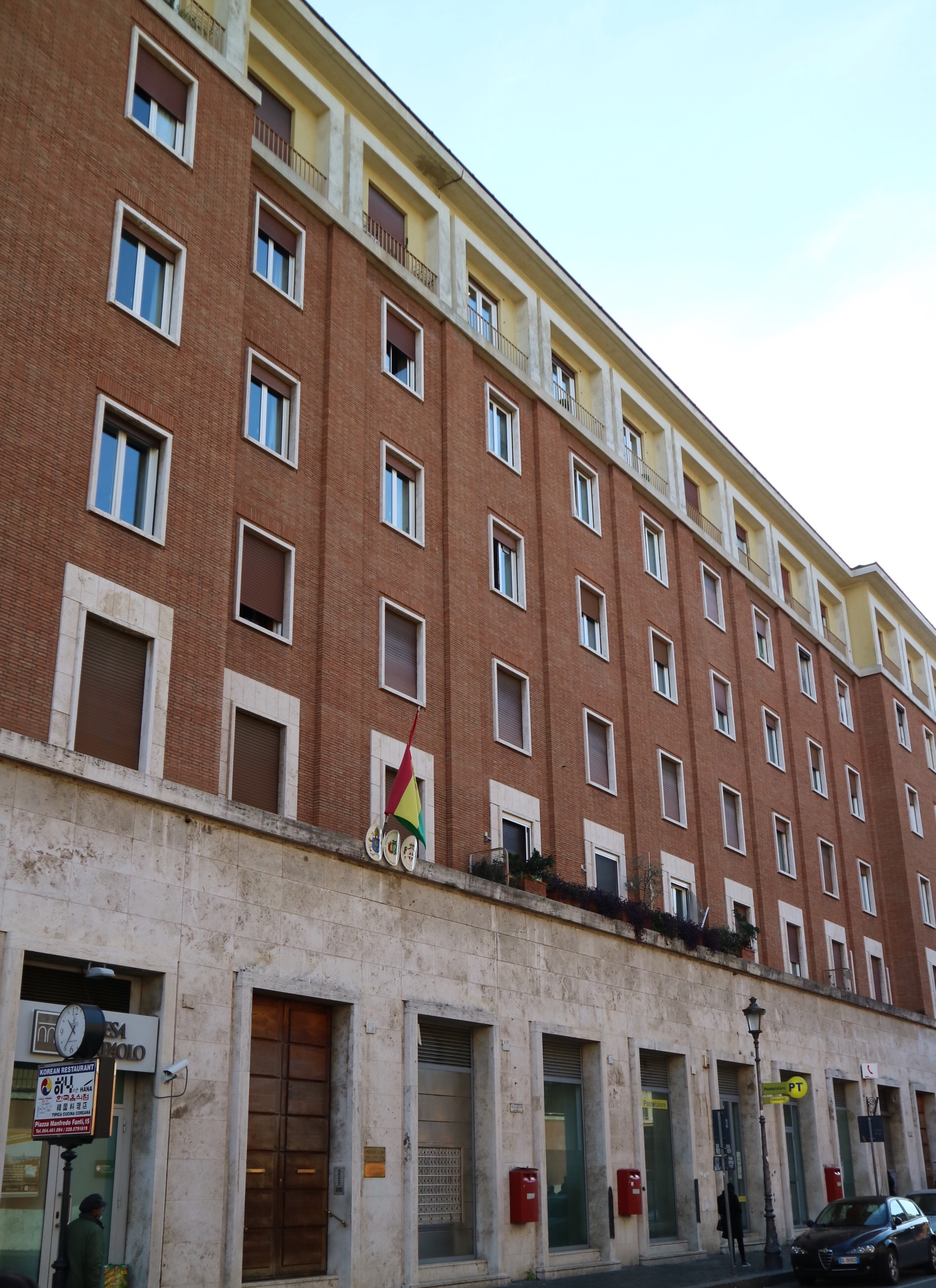
Embassy of Bolivia

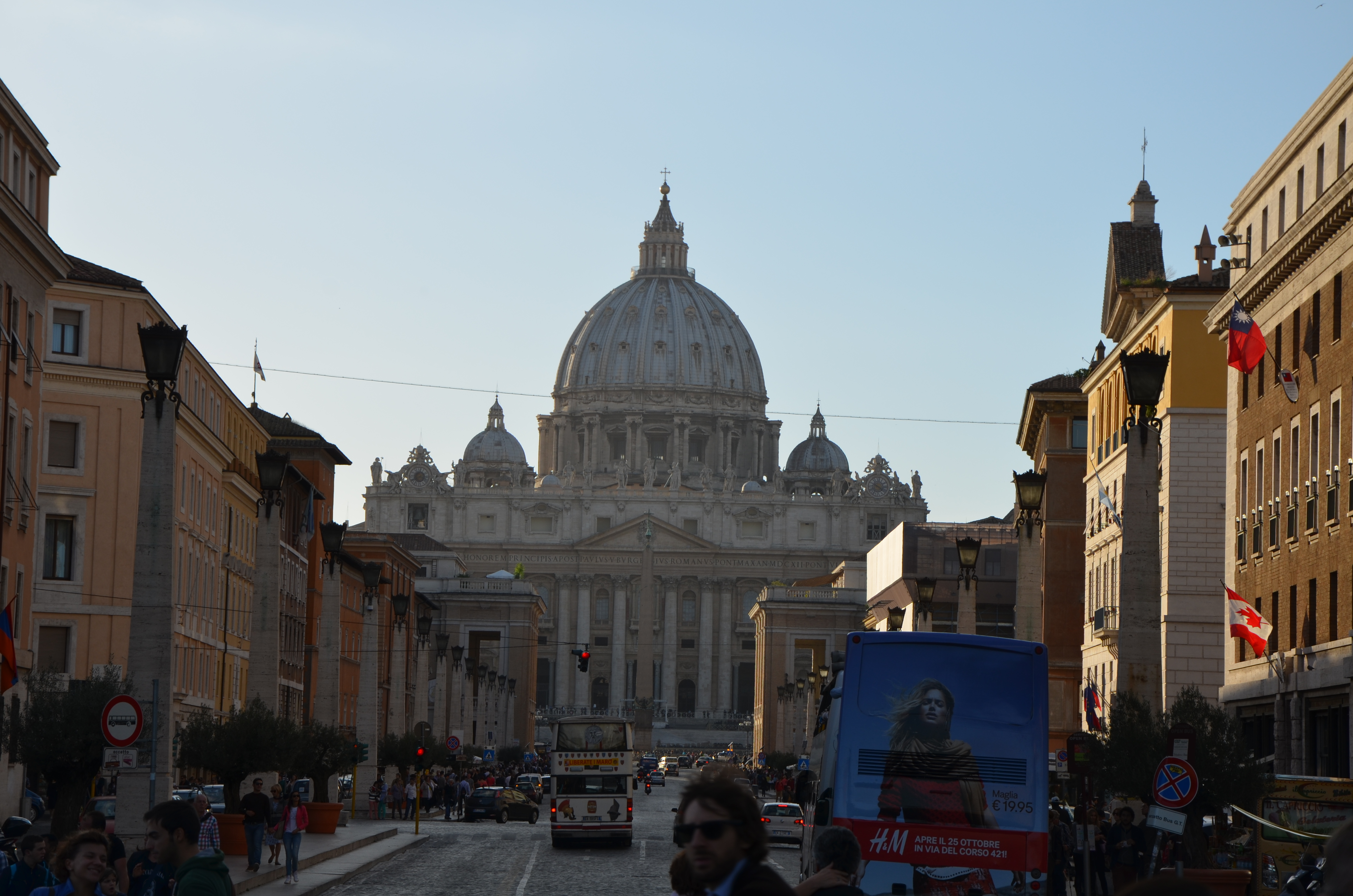
Embassy of Canada

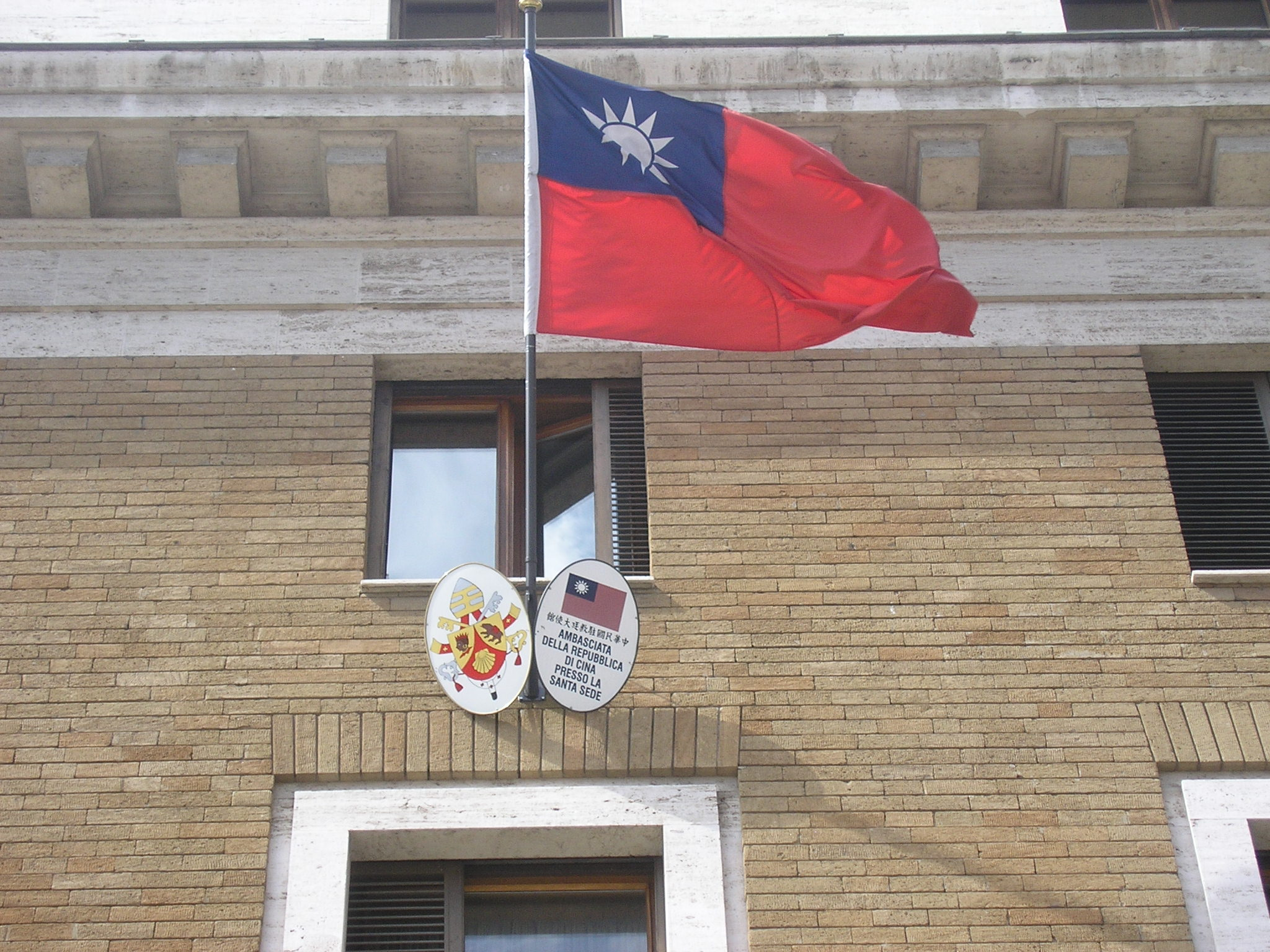
Embassy of the Republic of China (Taiwan)

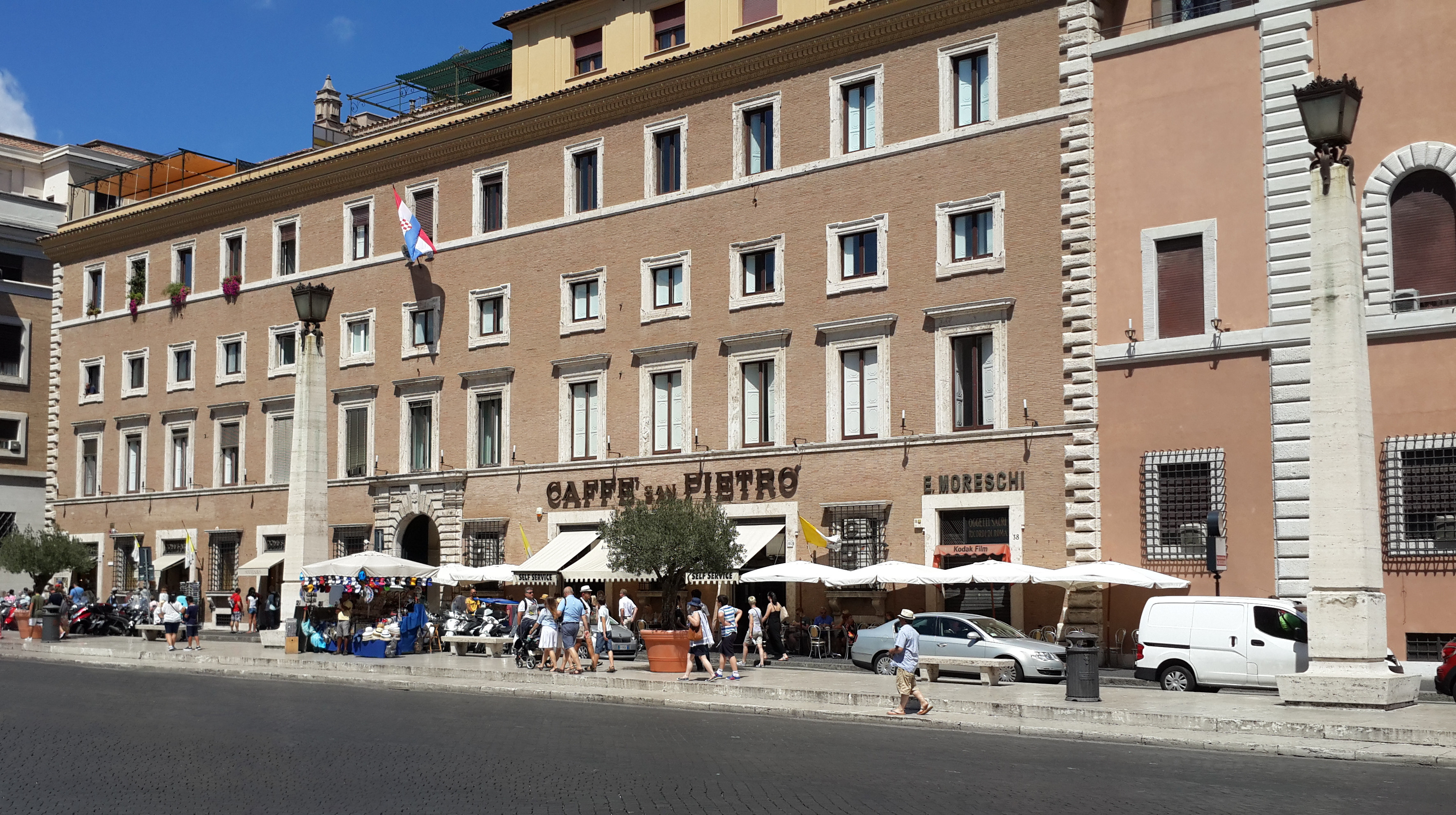
Embassy of Croatia

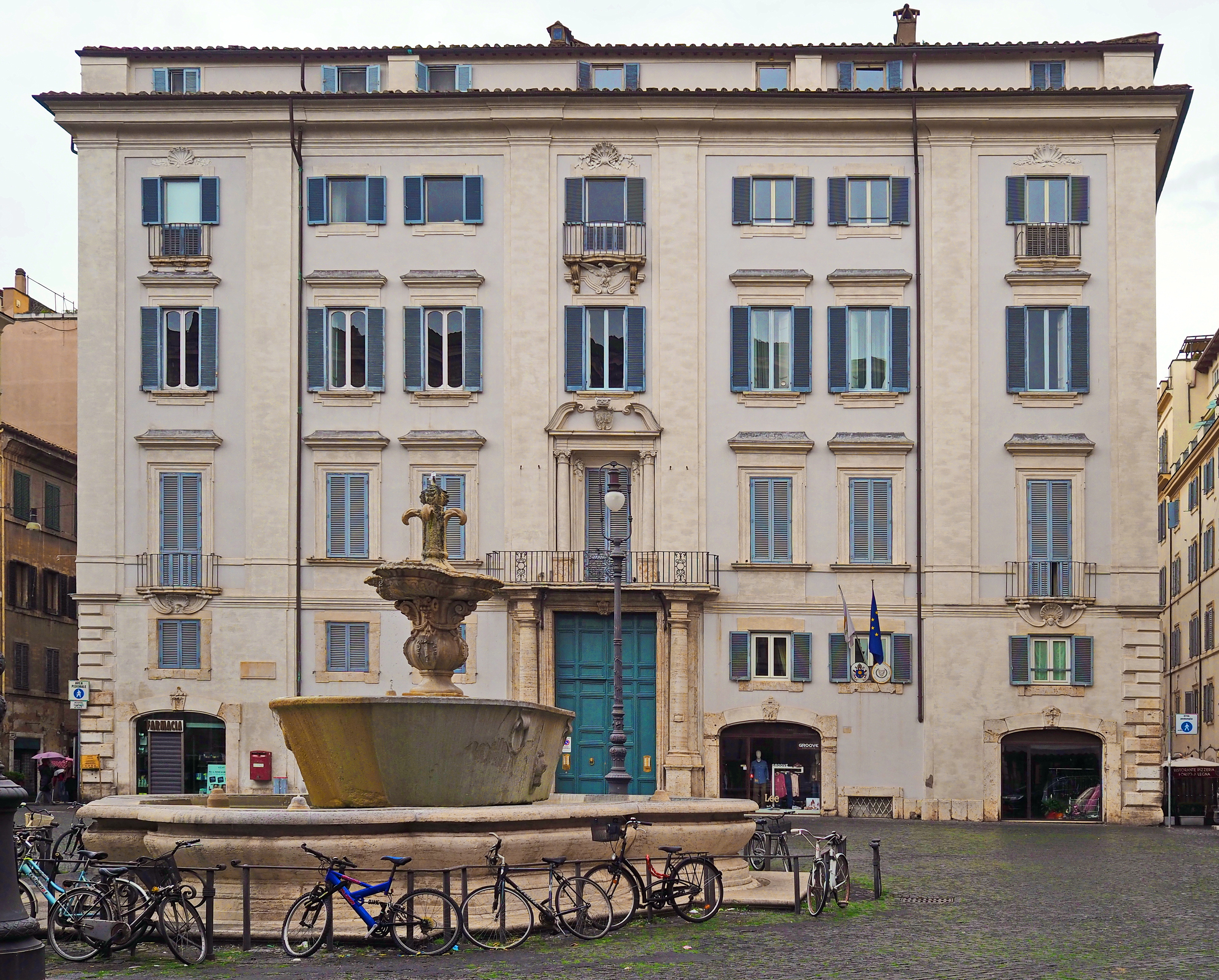
Embassy of Cyprus

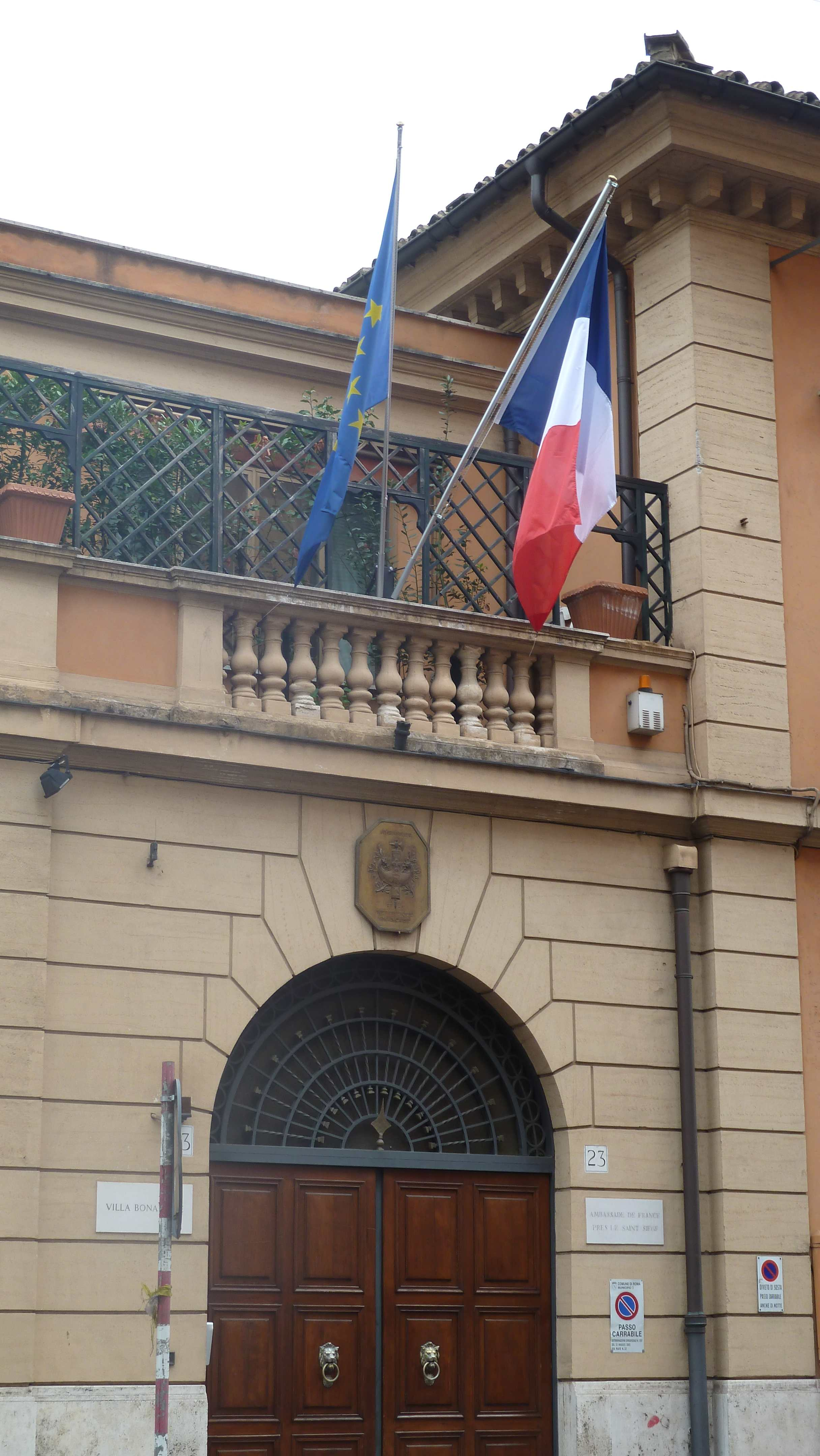
Embassy of France

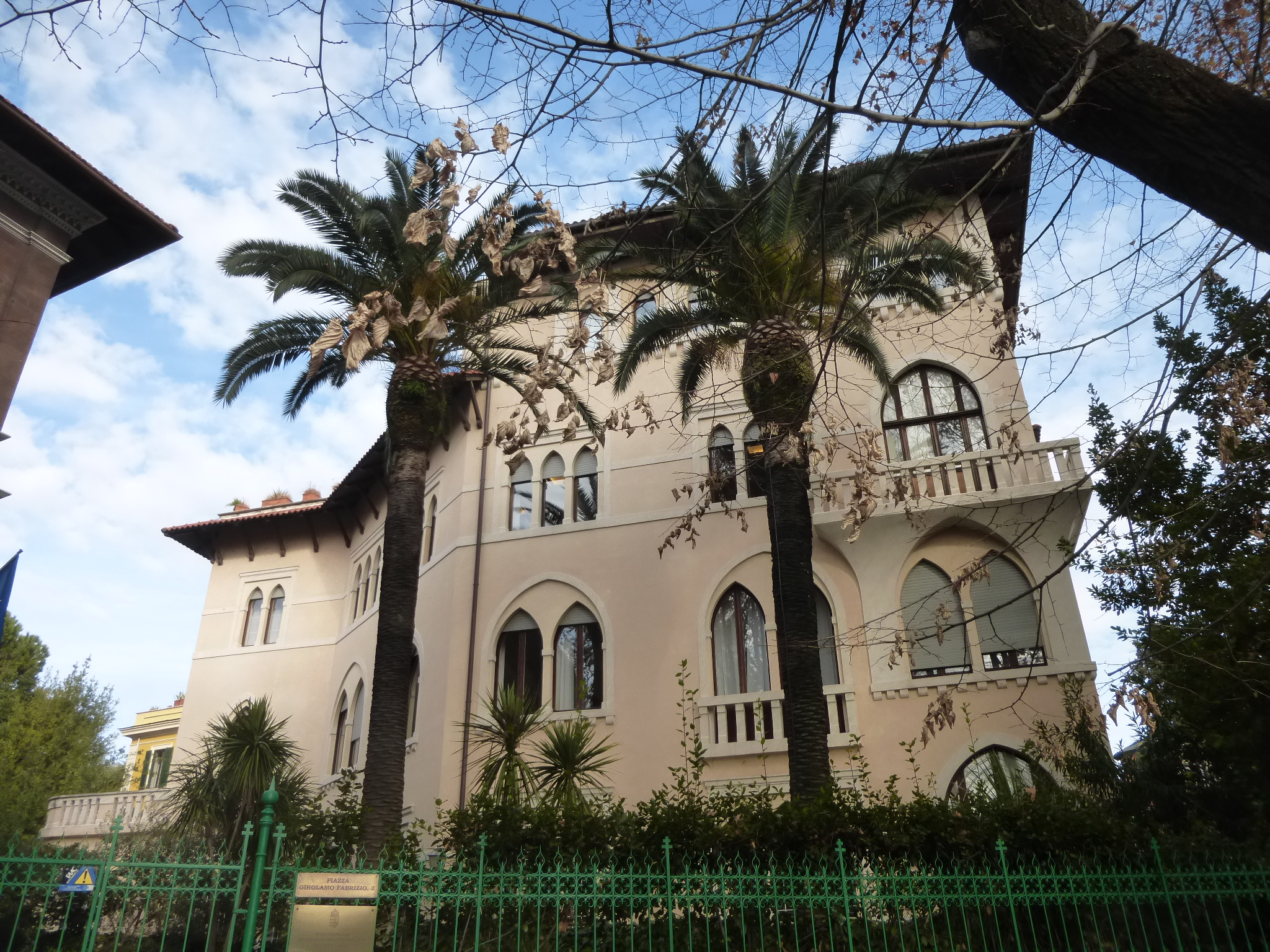
Embassy of Hungary

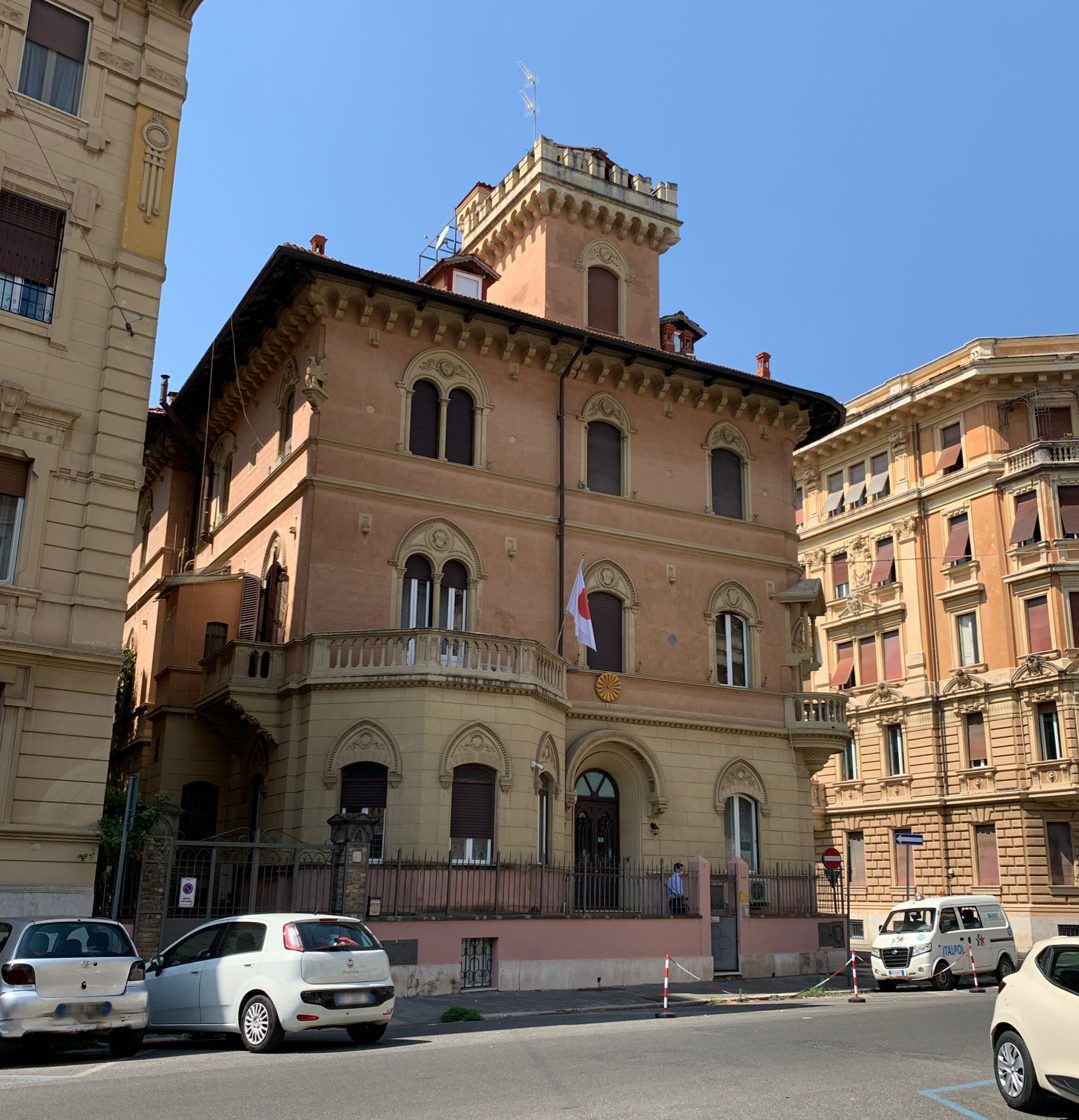
Embassy of Japan

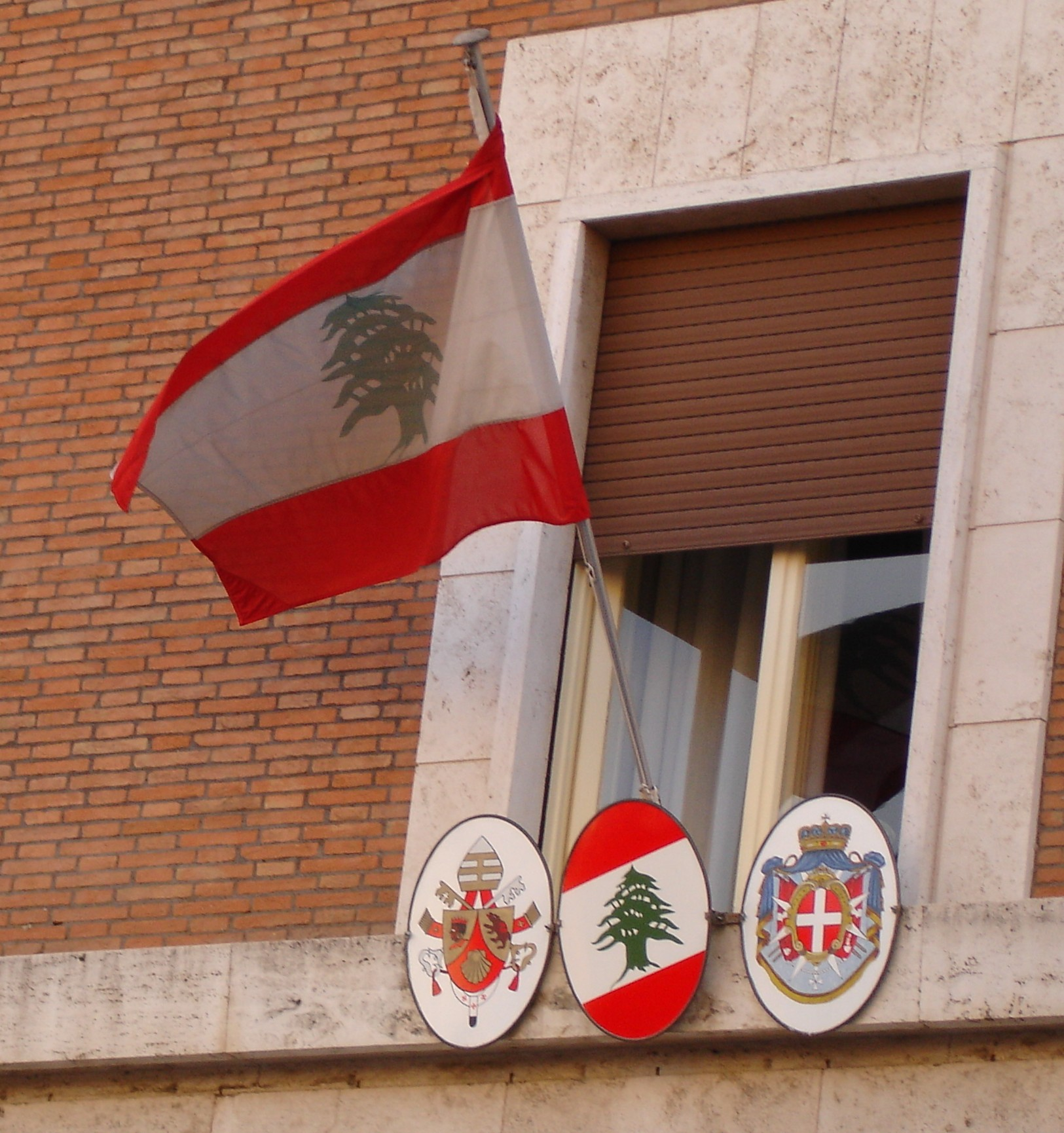
Embassy of Lebanon

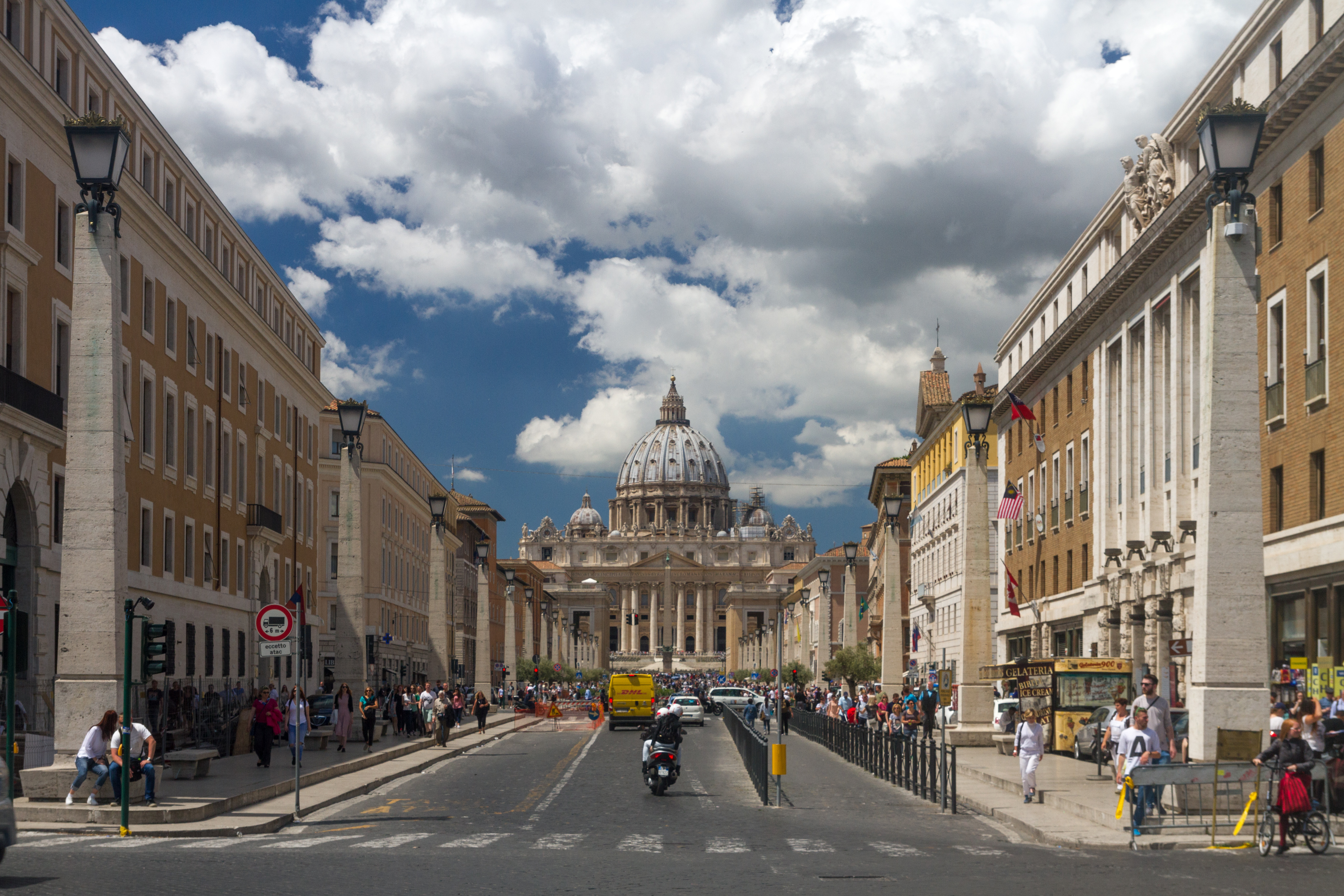
Embassy of Malaysia

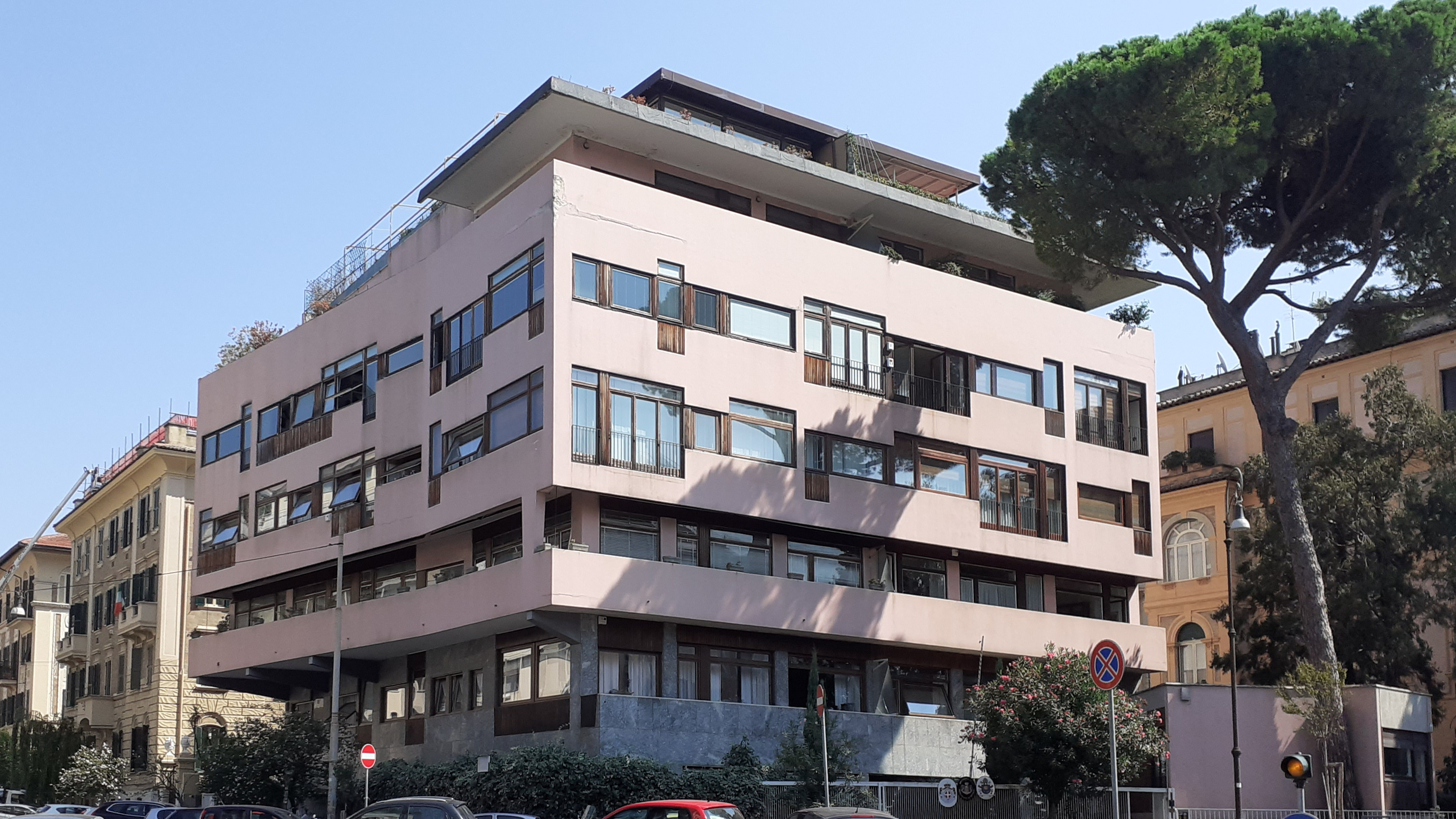
Embassy of Monaco

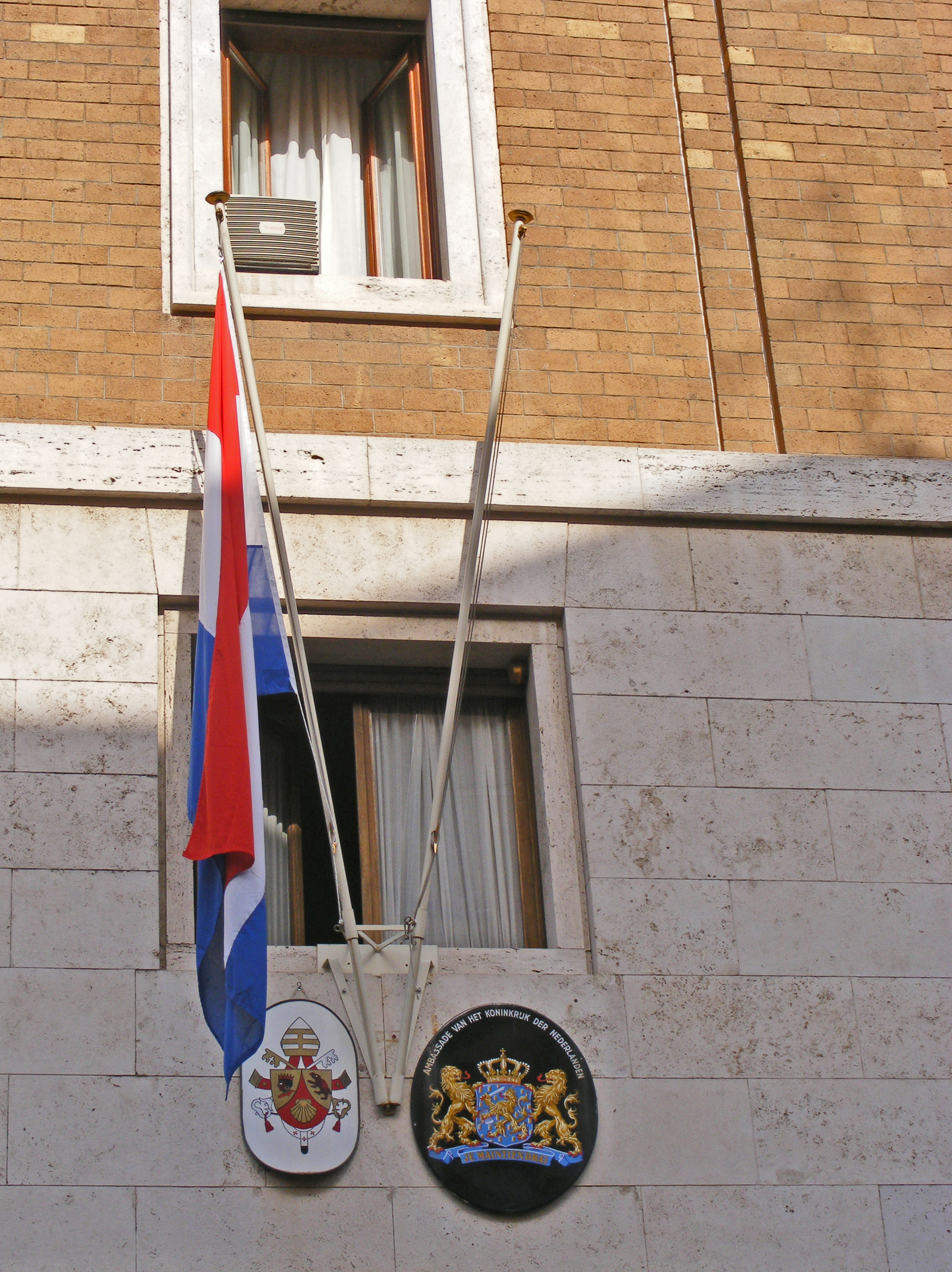
Embassy of the Netherlands

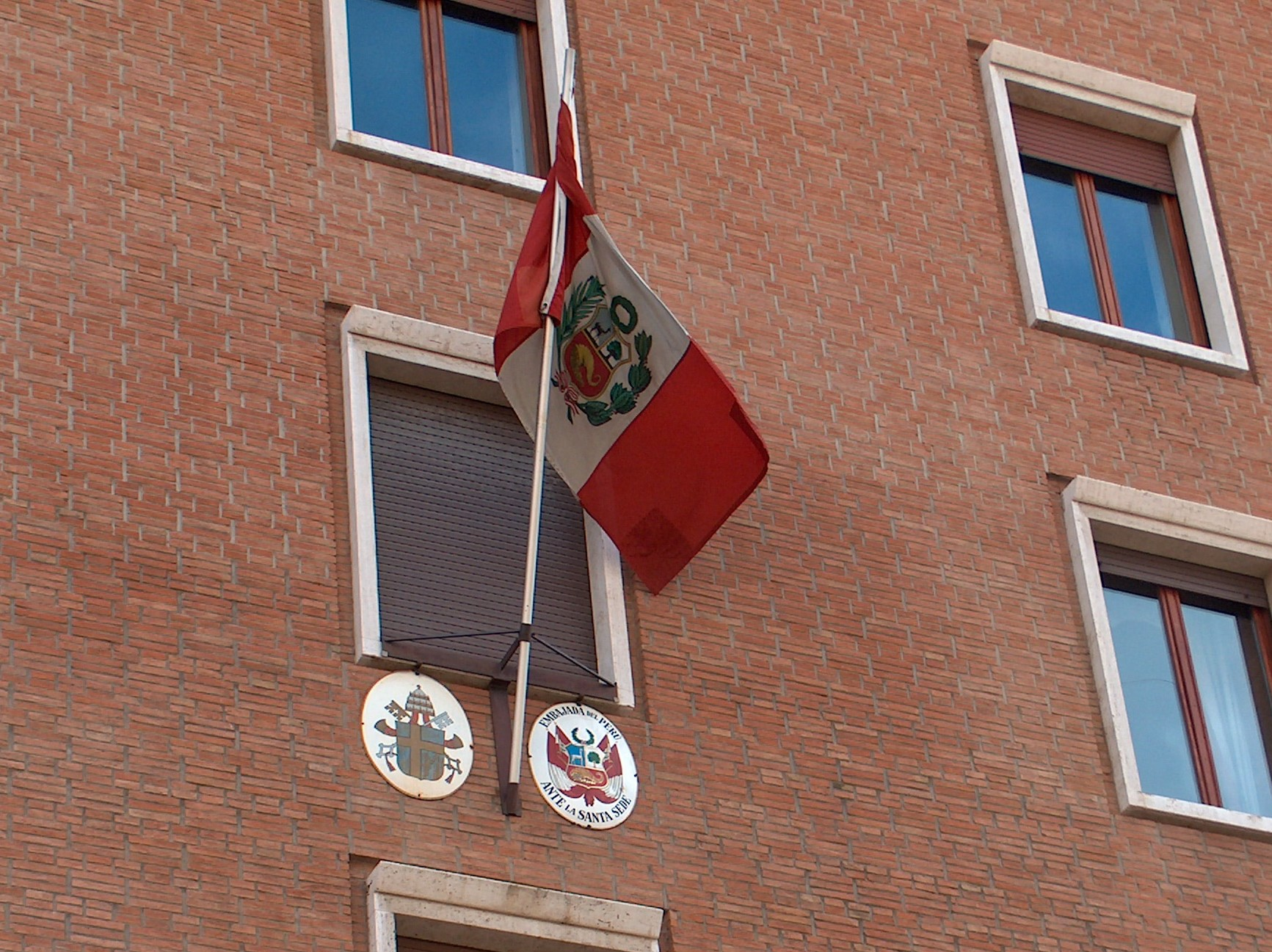
Embassy of Peru

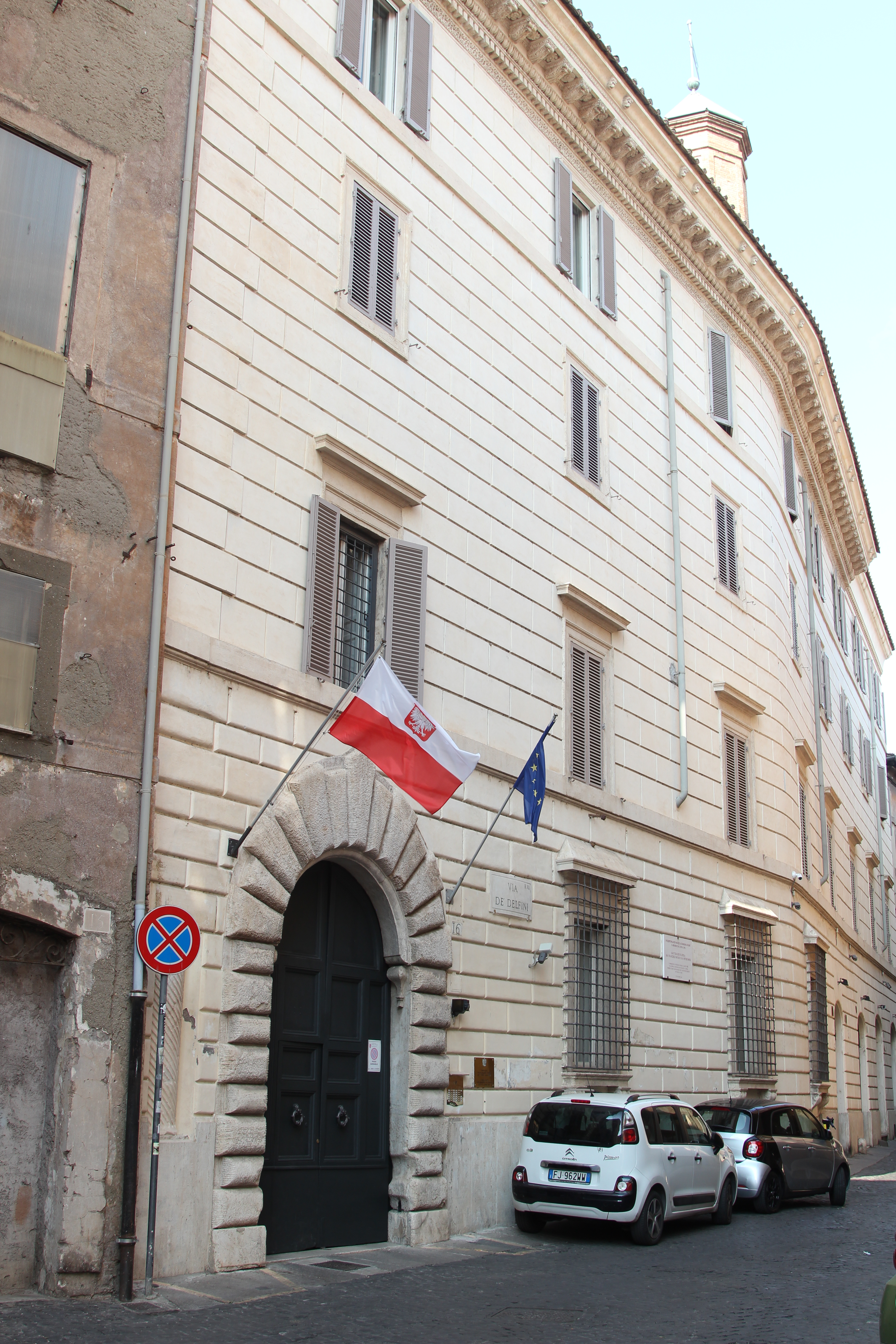
Embassy of Poland

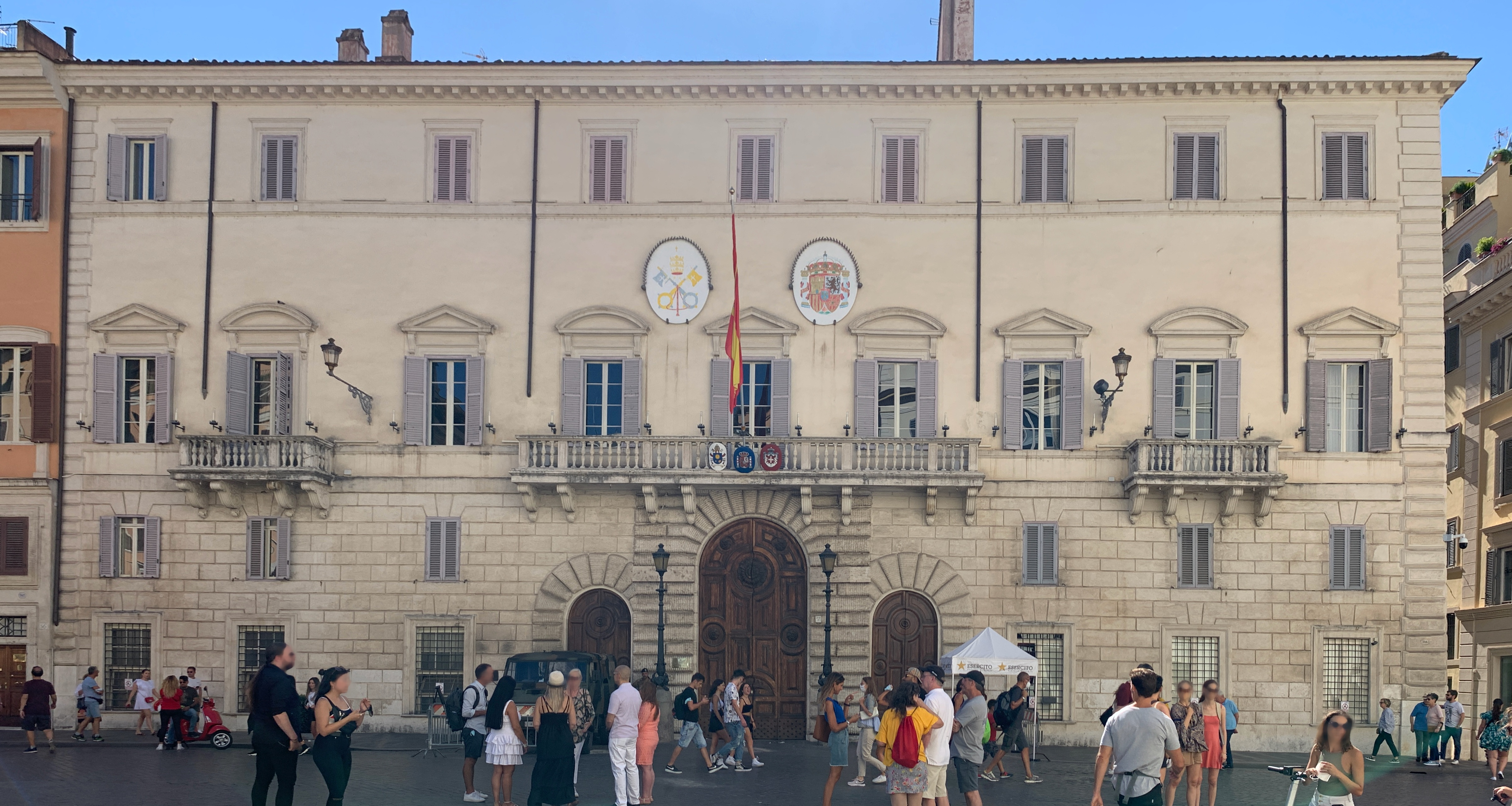
Embassy of Spain

== Accredited Embassies in Berlin, Germany ==
1. Eritrea
2. Guinea
3. Jamaica
4. Kyrgyzstan
5. Lesotho
6. Malawi
7. Namibia
8. Nepal
9. Tanzania
10. Uganda
11. Yemen

== Accredited Embassies in Brussels, Belgium ==
1. Denmark
2. Eswatini
3. Papua New Guinea
4. Seychelles
5. Sierra Leone
6. Togo
7. Trinidad and Tobago

== Accredited Embassies in London, United Kingdom ==
1. Barbados
2. Fiji
3. Gambia
4. Grenada
5. Guyana
6. Liberia
7. Mauritius
8. Zambia

== Accredited Embassies in Paris, France ==
1. Bahrain
2. Chad
3. Ethiopia
4. Guinea-Bissau
5. Jordan
6. Madagascar
7. Mali
8. Mauritania
9. Niger
10. Saint Lucia
11. Saint Vincent and the Grenadines
12. Sudan
13. Syria
14. Zimbabwe

== Accredited Embassies in Switzerland ==
=== Bern ===
1. Kuwait
2. Norway
3. Oman
4. Pakistan
5. South Africa
6. Thailand
7. Tunisia

=== Geneva ===
1. Algeria
2. Bangladesh
3. Iceland
4. Micronesia
5. Mongolia
6. Rwanda
7. Sri Lanka
8. Turkmenistan

== Accredited Embassies elsewhere ==
1. Andorra (Andorra la Vella)
2. Antigua and Barbuda (St John's)
3. Bahamas (Nassau)
4. Botswana (Stockholm)
5. Cape Verde (Lisbon)
6. Djibouti (Djibouti City)
7. Dominica (Roseau)
8. Estonia (Tallinn)
9. Finland (Zagreb)
10. India (Vienna)
11. Latvia (Riga)
12. Liechtenstein (Vaduz)
13. Luxembourg (Luxembourg)
14. Malta (Valletta)
15. Moldova (Prague)
16. Myanmar (Vienna)
17. New Zealand (Madrid)
18. Qatar (Zagreb)
19. São Tomé and Príncipe (Lisbon)
20. Singapore (Singapore)
21. Suriname (The Hague)
22. Sweden (Stockholm)
23. United Arab Emirates (Abu Dhabi)
24. Uzbekistan (Madrid)

== Countries without formal diplomatic missions to Holy See ==
- Afghanistan
- Bhutan
- Brunei
- China
- Comoros
- Laos
- Maldives
- Nicaragua
- North Korea
- Saudi Arabia
- Somalia
- Tuvalu
- Vietnam
