= List of permanent observers of the Sovereign Military Order of Malta to the United Nations =

The Sovereign Military Order of Malta has had Permanent Observer status at the United Nations General Assembly in New York City since 1994. It has also had an observer present at the UN offices in Vienna since 2009. This is a list of individuals who have been the UN Permanent Observer for the Order.

Dates	Head of Mission
2 January 1995 – 22 October 1996 (New York)	Pierre E. Awad (New York)
23 October 1996 – 26 April 1998 (New York)	Count Don Carlo Marullo di Condojanni, Prince of Casalnuovo
27 April 1998 – 1 June 2004 (New York)	José Antonio Linati Bosch, Count of Gaiano
8 June 2004 – 31 August 2015 (New York)	Ambassador Robert L. Shafer
1 July 2015 – 30 June, 2019 (New York)	Ambassador Oscar de Rojas
1 July 2019 – Present (New York)	Ambassador Dr. Paul Beresford-Hill (CBE)

== See also ==
- List of current permanent representatives to the United Nations
