= Liechtenstein–European Union relations =

EU-Liechtenstein relations
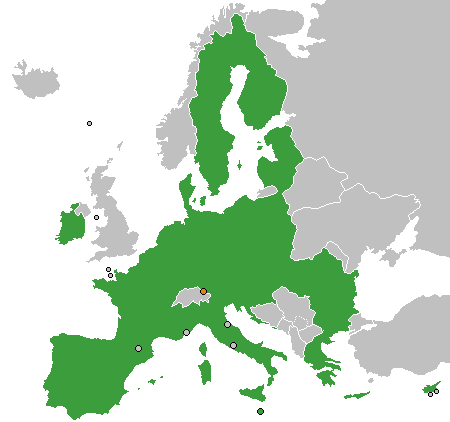

- European Union: Liechtenstein

Relations between the Principality of Liechtenstein (German: Fürstentum Liechtenstein) and the European Union (EU) are shaped heavily by Liechtenstein's participation in the European Economic Area (EEA).

== Comparison ==
	European Union	Liechtenstein
Population	447,206,135	38,896 (2020 estimate)
Area	4,324,782 km^{2} (1,669,808 sq mi)	160 km^{2} (62 sq mi)
Population density	115/km^{2} (300/sq mi)	237/km^{2} (613.8/sq mi)
Capital	Brussels (de facto)	Vaduz
Global cities	Paris, Amsterdam, Milan, Frankfurt, Madrid, Brussels, Warsaw, Stockholm, Vienna, Dublin, Luxembourg, Munich, Lisbon, Prague	None
Government	Supranational parliamentary democracy based on the European treaties	Unitary parliamentary semi-constitutional monarchy
First leader	High Authority President Jean Monnet	Monarch Karl I
Current leader	Council President António Costa; Commission President Ursula von der Leyen	Monarch Hans-Adam II; Prime Minister Brigitte Haas
Official languages	24 official languages	German
Main religions	72% Christianity (48% Roman Catholicism, 12% Protestantism, 8% Eastern Orthodoxy, 4% Other Christianity), 23% non-Religious, 3% Other, 2% Islam	83.2% Christianity (73.4% Roman Catholic (official), 9.8% Other Christian), 7.0% No religion, 5.9% Islam, 3.9% Others
Ethnic groups	Germans (ca. 83 million), French (ca. 67 million), Italians (ca. 60 million), Spanish (ca. 47 million), Poles (ca. 46 million), Romanians (ca. 16 million), Dutch (ca. 13 million), Greeks (ca. 11 million), Portuguese (ca. 11 million), and others	
GDP (nominal)	$16.477 trillion, $31,801 per capita	$5.155 billion, $143,151 per capita

== Market access ==
Liechtenstein is the only microstate (not counting Iceland by population) that is part of the EEA. Liechtenstein joined the EEA on 1 May 1995 after becoming a full member of the European Free Trade Association (EFTA) in 1991 (previously, it had participated in EFTA through Switzerland's membership). All EFTA states bar Switzerland are in the EEA, which gives them access to the EU single market. It also obliges Liechtenstein to apply European Union laws considered EEA-relevant. As of June 2016, around 5,000 of 23,000 EU legal acts in total were in force in the EEA. There is some further cooperation with the EU via Switzerland as Liechtenstein is highly integrated with the Swiss economy (including using the Swiss franc).

== Schengen ==
Countries that could join the European Union Current members Candidate countries Applicant / potential candidate countries Membership possible Membership rejected

On 28 February 2008, Liechtenstein signed the Schengen Agreement and became part of the Schengen Area on 19 December 2011. Before this, Switzerland shared an open border with Liechtenstein and was already a full Schengen Area member. This open border was not considered a threat to European security because it would be highly difficult to enter Liechtenstein without first landing in or entering a Schengen state. The border with Austria was not open, and it was treated as an external border post by Austria and Liechtenstein, making it necessary to pass through customs and passport control before crossing.

Liechtenstein signed a Schengen association agreement with the European Union on 28 February 2008, and originally planned to join the Schengen Area on 1 November 2009. However, ratification was initially delayed at the behest of Sweden and Germany who felt that Liechtenstein had not done enough to fight tax evasion; the Council of Ministers eventually consented to the ratification of the protocol on 7 March 2011, with the protocol entering into force a month later. Liechtenstein was due to join the Schengen Area by the end of 2011 and did so on 19 December.

== Free Movement of Labour ==
Although a member of the European Economic Area Liechtenstein does not adhere to the free movement of labour unlike every other member of the European Union and EFTA because its small size and relative prosperity mean that it is vulnerable to high immigration.

== Other agreements ==
There are further bilateral agreements between the two parties on matters such as taxation of savings. There are also ongoing talks on combating fraud and exchanging information on tax matters.

== Liechtenstein's foreign relations with EU member states ==
- Austria
- Belgium
- Bulgaria
- Croatia
- Cyprus
- Czech Republic
- Denmark
- Estonia
- Finland
- France
- Germany
- Greece
- Hungary
- (Republic of Ireland) Ireland
- Italy
- Latvia
- Lithuania
- Luxembourg
- Malta
- Netherlands
- Poland
- Portugal
- Romania
- Slovakia
- Slovenia
- Spain
- Sweden

== Diplomatic relations between Liechtenstein and EU member states ==
Country	Liechtenstein embassy	Reciprocal embassy	Notes
Austria	Vienna		
Belgium	Brussels	Bern, Switzerland	Liechtenstein Mission to the EU
Bulgaria	Sofia		
Croatia	Zagreb		
Cyprus	Nicosia		
Czech Republic	Prague		
Denmark	Copenhagen		
Estonia	Tallinn		
Finland	Helsinki		
France	Paris	Bern, Switzerland	Liechtenstein Mission to the Council of Europe in Strasbourg
Germany	Berlin	Bern, Switzerland	
Greece	Athens		
Hungary	Budapest		
Ireland	Dublin		
Italy	Rome		
Latvia	Riga		
Lithuania	Vilnius		
Luxembourg	Luxembourg City		
Malta	Valletta		
Netherlands	The Hague		
Poland	Warsaw		
Portugal	Lisbon		
Romania	Bucharest		
Slovakia	Bratislava		
Slovenia	Ljubljana		
Spain	Madrid		
Sweden	Stockholm		

== See also ==
- Microstates and the European Union
- Switzerland–European Union relations
