= List of sovereign states in the 1990s =

This is a list of sovereign states in the 1990s, giving an overview of states around the world during the period between 1 January 1990 and 31 December 1999. It contains 241 entries, arranged alphabetically, with information on the status and recognition of their sovereignty. It includes 197 widely recognized sovereign states, 28 entities which claim an effective sovereignty but are considered de facto dependencies of other powers by the general international community, 2 associated states, 14 states which were initially unrecognized but then gained full recognition later in the decade, and 1 state which was initially widely recognized but then lost full recognition later in the decade.

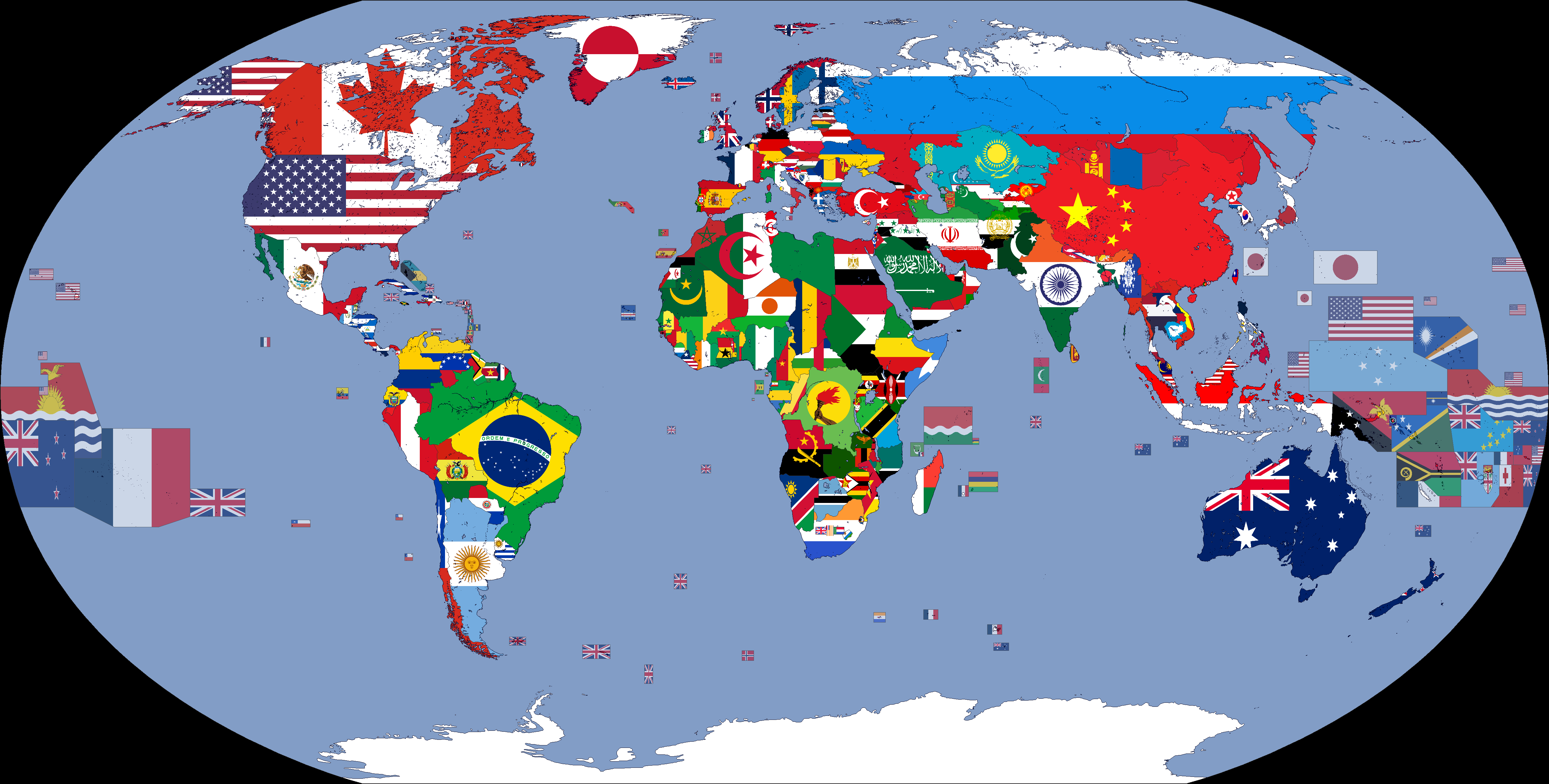
Map of the World in 1992

== Members or observers of the United Nations ==
| Name and capital city | Information on status and recognition of sovereignty |
|---|---|
=== A ===
| → → Afghanistan; Capital: Kabul (to 26 September 1996), Mazar-i-Sharif (from 26 September 1996 to 25 May 1997), Taloqan (from 25 May 1997): Republic of Afghanistan (to 28 April 1992) (Note: Sibghatullah Mojaddedi entered Kabul after the fall of Mohammad Najibullah and proclaimed the Islamic State of Afghanistan.); Islamic State of Afghanistan (from 28 April 1992) | Widely recognized UN member state. (Note: The Islamic State of Afghanistan was not recognized by Pakistan, Saudi Arabia, or the United Arab Emirates after 26 September 1996.) Claimed to be the sole legitimate government of Afghanistan and recognized as such by the UN, but only controlled a small portion of the country after 26 September 1996. |
| → Albania; Capital: Tirana: People's Socialist Republic of Albania (to 29 April 1991) (Note: Albania adopted a temporary basic law on 29 April 1991, changing the name of the country to "Republic of Albania". This change was confirmed in the constitution of 1998.); Republic of Albania (from 29 April 1991) | Widely recognized UN member state. |
| Algeria – People's Democratic Republic of Algeria; Capital: Algiers | Widely recognized UN member state. |
| → Andorra – Principality of Andorra; Capital: Andorra la Vella | Widely recognized independent state. The President of France and Bishop of Urgell were ex officio Co-Princes of Andorra. UN member state (from 28 July 1993). The defense of Andorra was the responsibility of France and Spain. |
| Angola; Capital: Luanda: People's Republic of Angola (to 25 August 1992); Republic of Angola (from 25 August 1992) | Widely recognized UN member state. |
| Antigua and Barbuda; Capital: St. John's | Widely recognized UN member state; Commonwealth realm. Antigua and Barbuda had two dependencies, Barbuda and Redonda. |
| Argentina – Argentine Republic (Note: The name "Argentine Nation" was also used for the purposes of legislation.); Capital: Buenos Aires | Widely recognized UN member state. Argentina was a federation of 22 provinces, two federal territories, and one federal territory. (Note: 23 provinces: Buenos Aires, Catamarca, Chaco, Chubut, Córdoba, Corrientes, Entre Ríos, Formosa, Jujuy, La Pampa, La Rioja, Mendoza, Misiones, Neuquén, Río Negro, Salta, San Juan, San Luis, Santa Cruz, Santa Fe, Santiago del Estero, Tierra del Fuego (from 26 April 1991), Tucumán. 1 Autonomous City: Buenos Aires (from 6 August 1996). 2 Territories: Buenos Aires (to 6 August 1996), Tierra del Fuego (to 26 April 1991).) It had a claim over Argentine Antarctica, which was suspended under the Antarctic Treaty. It also claimed the Falkland Islands and South Georgia and the South Sandwich Islands, both of which were British overseas territories. |
| Armenia – Republic of Armenia (from 23 September 1991) (Note: The Armenian people voted for succession from the Soviet Union in a referendum on 21 September 1991. The parliament of Armenia ratified the result on 23 September 1991.); Capital: Yerevan | De facto independent state; claimed by the Soviet Union to 26 December 1991. Widely recognized (from 26 December 1991). (Note: Armenia was not recognized by Pakistan.) UN member state (from 2 March 1992). |
| Australia – Commonwealth of Australia; Capital: Canberra | Widely recognized UN member state; Commonwealth realm. Australia was a federation of six states and three territories. (Note: 6 states: New South Wales, Queensland, South Australia, Tasmania, Victoria, Western Australia. 3 territories: Australian Capital Territory, Jervis Bay Territory, Northern Territory.) It had sovereignty over the following external territories: Ashmore and Cartier Islands; Australian Antarctic Territory (suspended under the Antarctic Treaty.); Christmas Island; Cocos (Keeling) Islands; Coral Sea Islands; Heard Island and McDonald Islands; Norfolk Island |
| Austria – Republic of Austria; Capital: Vienna | Widely recognized UN member state. EU member (from 1 January 1995). Austria was a federation of nine states. (Note: 9 states: Burgenland, Carinthia, Lower Austria, Salzburg, Styria, Tyrol, Upper Austria, Vorarlberg, Vienna.) |
| Azerbaijan – Republic of Azerbaijan (from 30 August 1991) (Note: On August 30, 1991, Azerbaijan's Parliament adopted the Declaration on the Restoration of the State Independence of the Republic of Azerbaijan.); Capital: Baku | De facto independent state; claimed by the Soviet Union to 26 December 1991. Widely recognized state from 26 December 1991; UN member state from 2 March 1992. Azerbaijan had one autonomous republic, Nakhchivan. It included the disputed region of Nagorno-Karabakh, where a partially recognized breakaway republic declared independence on 6 January 1992. |
=== B ===
| The Bahamas – Commonwealth of the Bahamas; Capital: Nassau | Widely recognized UN member state; Commonwealth realm. |
| Bahrain – State of Bahrain; Capital: Manama | Widely recognized UN member state. |
| Bangladesh – People's Republic of Bangladesh; Capital: Dhaka | Widely recognized UN member state. |
| Barbados; Capital: Bridgetown | Widely recognized UN member state. Commonwealth realm. |
| Belgium – Kingdom of Belgium; Capital: Brussels | Widely recognized UN member state. EEC member to 1 November 1993; EU member from 1 November 1993. After 5 May 1993, Belgium was a federation of three communities and three regions. (Note: 3 communities: Flemish Community, French Community, German-speaking Community. 3 regions: Brussels, Flanders, Wallonia.) |
| Belize; Capital: Belmopan | Widely recognized UN member state. (Note: Belize was not recognized by Guatemala (to 24 November 1992)) Commonwealth realm. |
| → Benin; Capital: Porto-Novo (official), Cotonou (seat of government): People's Republic of Benin (to 1 March 1990) (Note: The People's Republic of Benin was renamed the Republic of Benin on 1 March 1990. Its new constitution was adopted on 2 December 1990.); Republic of Benin (from 1 March 1990) | Widely recognized UN member state. |
| Bhutan – Kingdom of Bhutan; Capital: Thimphu | Widely recognized UN member state. Bhutan was officially guided by India in its foreign affairs, but effectively pursued an independent foreign policy. |
| Bolivia – Republic of Bolivia; Capital: Sucre (official), La Paz (administrative) | Widely recognized UN member state. |
| → Bosnia and Herzegovina (from 5 April 1992); Capital: Sarajevo: Republic of Bosnia and Herzegovina (from 5 April 1992 to 14 December 1995) (Note: Bosnia and Herzegovina declared independence from Yugoslavia on 5 April 1992.) (Note: The Dayton Agreement was signed on 14 December 1995, creating the unified state of Bosnia and Herzegovina.); Bosnia and Herzegovina (from 14 December 1995) | De facto independent state. Claimed by Yugoslavia (to 28 April 1992). Widely recognized (from 7 April 1992). UN member state (from 22 May 1992). Much of the de jure territory of the Republic of Bosnia and Herzegovina was the under control of the following self-declared entities which, although they did not claim independence, were effectively self-governing: Autonomous Province of Western Bosnia (from 27 September 1993 to 26 July 1995); Croatian Republic of Herzeg-Bosnia (from 28 August 1993 to 18 March 1994); (Republika Srpska) Serbian Republic of Bosnia and Herzegovina (to 7 April 1992); In addition, there were three states which had declared and established de facto independence from Bosnia and Herzegovina: Republika Srpska (from 7 April 1992 to 14 December 1995); Republic of Western Bosnia (from 26 July 1995 to 7 August 1995); After the Dayton Accords, Bosnia and Herzegovina was a federation of two constituent entities: the Federation of Bosnia and Herzegovina, which was itself a federation of ten cantons, (Note: 10 cantons: Bosnian-Podrinje, Canton 10, Central Bosnia, Herzegovina-Neretva, Posavina, Sarajevo, Tuzla, Una-Sana, West Herzegovina, Zenica-Doboj.) and Republika Srpska. There was also a neutral Brčko District (from 5 March 1999). |
| Botswana – Republic of Botswana; Capital: Gaborone | Widely recognized UN member state. |
| → Brazil – Federative Republic of Brazil; Capital: Brasília | Widely recognized UN member state; Brazil was a federation of 26 states and one federal district. (Note: 26 states: Acre, Alagoas, Amapá, Amazonas, Bahia, Ceará, Espírito Santo, Goiás, Maranhão, Mato Grosso, Mato Grosso do Sul, Minas Gerais, Pará, Paraíba, Paraná, Pernambuco, Piauí, Rio Grande do Norte, Rio Grande do Sul, Rio de Janeiro, Rondônia, Roraima, Santa Catarina, São Paulo, Sergipe, Tocantins. 1 federal district: Federal District.) |
| Brunei – State of Brunei, Abode of Peace; Capital: Bandar Seri Begawan | Widely recognized UN member state. Brunei claimed part of the Spratly Islands (disputed by the People's Republic of China, the Republic of China, Vietnam, the Philippines, and Malaysia). |
| → Bulgaria; Capital: Sofia: People's Republic of Bulgaria (to 15 November 1990) (Note: The Grand National Assembly of Bulgaria adopted a motion changing Bulgaria's official name on 15 November 1990.); Republic of Bulgaria (from 15 November 1990) | Widely recognized UN member state. |
| Burkina Faso; Capital: Ouagadougou | Widely recognized UN member state. |
Burma → Myanmar
| Burundi – Republic of Burundi; Capital: Bujumbura | Widely recognized UN member state. |
| → → Byelorussia / Belarus (from 27 July 1990); Capital: Minsk: Byelorussian Soviet Socialist Republic (from 27 July 1990 to 25 August 1991); Republic of Belarus (from 25 August 1991) | Widely recognized UN member state. De facto independent state that was nominally a constituent state of the Soviet Union to 26 December 1991; widely recognized from 26 December 1991. |
=== C ===
Cambodia → Kampuchea
| Cameroon – Republic of Cameroon; Capital: Yaoundé | Widely recognized UN member state. |
| Canada; Capital: Ottawa | Widely recognized UN member state. Commonwealth realm. Canada was a federation of ten provinces and three territories. (Note: 10 provinces: Alberta, British Columbia, Manitoba, New Brunswick, Newfoundland, Nova Scotia, Ontario, Prince Edward Island, Quebec, Saskatchewan. 3 territories: Northwest Territories, Nunavut (from 1 April 1999), Yukon.) |
| → Cape Verde – Republic of Cape Verde; Capital: Praia | Widely recognized UN member state. |
| Central African Republic; Capital: Bangui | Widely recognized UN member state. |
| Chad – Republic of Chad; Capital: N'Djamena | Widely-recognized UN member state. |
| Chile – Republic of Chile; Capital: Santiago | Widely-recognized UN member state; it had a claim over Chilean Antarctic Territory which was suspended under the Antarctic Treaty. |
| China – People's Republic of China; Capital: Beijing | Widely recognized UN member state. (Note: The People's Republic of China and the Republic of China did not recognize each other, as both states claimed to be the sole legitimate government of China. The following states recognized the ROC instead of the PRC: Bahamas (to 23 May 1997), Belize, Burkina Faso (from 4 February 1994), Central African Republic (from 8 July 1991 to 29 January 1998), Chad (from 15 August 1997), Costa Rica, Dominica, Dominican Republic, El Salvador, the Gambia (from 25 July 1995), Guatemala, Guinea-Bissau (from 26 May 1990 to 13 April 1998), Grenada, Haiti, Honduras, South Korea (to 24 August 1992), Lesotho (from 5 April 1990 to 12 January 1994), Macedonia (to 27 January 1999), Malawi, Marshall Islands (from 20 November 1998), Monaco (to 16 January 1995), Nauru, Nicaragua (from 9 November 1990), Niger (from 30 June 1992 to 19 August 1996), Palau (from 1999), Panama, Paraguay, Saint Kitts and Nevis, Saint Lucia (to 1 September 1997), Saint Vincent and the Grenadines, São Tomé and Príncipe (from 6 May 1997), Saudi Arabia (to 21 July 1990), Senegal (from 6 January 1996), Solomon Islands, South Africa (to 1 January 1998), Swaziland, Tonga (to 2 November 1998), Tuvalu, and Vatican City. After 9 September 1997, Liberia recognized both the ROC and the PRC, which led to the PRC severing diplomatic relations.) The People's Republic of China had five autonomous regions: Guangxi, Inner Mongolia, Ningxia, Xinjiang and Tibet. Additionally, it had sovereignty over two special administrative regions: Hong Kong (from 1 July 1997); Macau (from 20 December 1999); The People's Republic of China claimed Taiwan, Kinmen, the Matsu Islands, Pratas Island and the Vereker Banks, and Itu Aba, all of which were governed by the Republic of China. It also claimed the Paracel Islands (disputed by the Republic of China and Vietnam), the Spratly Islands (disputed by the Republic of China, Vietnam, the Philippines, Malaysia and Brunei), and South Tibet (controlled by India). The People's Republic of China administered Aksai Chin and the Trans-Karakoram Tract, which were within the disputed region of Kashmir. |
| Colombia – Republic of Colombia; Capital: Bogotá | Widely recognized UN member state. Colombia administered Bajo Nuevo Bank and Serranilla Bank (disputed by Nicaragua and the United States) |
| → → Comoros – Federal Islamic Republic of the Comoros; Capital: Moroni | Widely recognized UN member state. The Comoros was a federation of three islands: Grande Comore, Mohéli, and Anjouan. Anjouan was a de facto independent state from 3 August 1997. Mohéli was a de facto independent state from 11 August 1997 to 1998. Comoros claimed sovereignty over the French overseas territories of Mayotte and the Glorioso Islands. It also claimed Banc du Geyser (disputed by Madagascar and France). |
| → Congo / Congo, Republic of the Capital: Brazzaville: People's Republic of the Congo (to 10 June 1991) (Note: A Sovereign National Conference was held in the People's Republic of Congo from 25 February 1991 to 10 June 1991, during which the country was renamed.); Republic of the Congo (from 10 June 1991) | Widely recognized UN member state. |
Congo, Democratic Republic of the → Zaire
| → Costa Rica – Republic of Costa Rica; Capital: San José | Widely-recognized UN member state. |
Côte d'Ivoire → Ivory Coast
| Croatia – Republic of Croatia (from 25 June 1991) (Note: Croatia and Slovenia declared independence from Yugoslavia on 25 June 1991.); Capital: Zagreb | De facto independent state. Claimed by Yugoslavia (to 28 April 1992). Widely recognized (from 15 January 1992). UN member state (from 22 May 1992). Croatia contained the following self-declared entities, all of which claimed to be part of Yugoslavia. Although they did not explicitly claim independence, they were de facto self-governing: SAO Krajina (to 19 December 1991); SAO Western Slavonia (from 12 August 1991 to 26 February 1992); SAO Eastern Slavonia, Baranja and Western Syrmia (to 26 February 1992); → Republic of Serbian Krajina (from 19 December 1991 to 7 August 1995); → Republic of Eastern Slavonia, Baranja and Western Syrmia (from 7 August 1995 to 15 January 1996); On 15 January 1996, the last of these entities came under the administration of the United Nations Transitional Authority for Eastern Slavonia, Baranja and Western Sirmium. It was reintegrated into Croatia on 15 January 1998. |
| Cuba – Republic of Cuba; Capital: Havana | Widely recognized UN member state; the Cuban area of Guantánamo Bay was under the complete control of the United States. |
| Cyprus – Republic of Cyprus; Capital: Nicosia | Widely recognized UN member state. (Note: Cyprus was not recognized by Turkey or Northern Cyprus.) The northeastern part of the island was the de facto independent state of Northern Cyprus, recognized only by Turkey. |
| Czech Republic (from 1 January 1993) (Note: Czechoslovakia was dissolved on midnight of 31 December 1992. From the start of 1993, the Czech Republic and Slovakia were independent countries.); Capital: Prague | Widely recognized independent state. (Note: Owing to a dispute over lands seized during World War II, Liechtenstein and Czechoslovakia did not recognize each other. This dispute continued with Czechoslovakia's successor states.) UN member state (from 19 January 1993). |
| Czechoslovakia (to 31 December 1992); Capital: Prague: Czechoslovak Socialist Republic (to 29 March 1990) (Note: Following the Velvet Revolution, the Czechoslovak Socialist Republic was replaced by the Czechoslovak Federative Republic.); Czechoslovak Federative Republic (from 29 March 1990 to 20 April 1990) (Note: After a naming dispute, the name of Czechoslovakia was changed to "Czech and Slovak Federative Republic"); Czech and Slovak Federative Republic (from 23 April 1990 to 31 December 1992) | Widely recognized UN member state. Czechoslovakia was a federation of two republics. (Note: 2 republics: Czech Socialist Republic (renamed Czech Republic on 29 March 1990), Slovak Socialist Republic (renamed Slovak Republic on 1 March 1990).) |
=== D ===
| Denmark – Kingdom of Denmark; Capital: Copenhagen | Widely recognized UN member state; EEC member to 1 November 1993. EU member (from 1 November 1993). The Danish Realm also included two of its constituent states: Greenland; Faroe Islands |
| Djibouti – Republic of Djibouti; Capital: Djibouti | Widely recognized UN member state. |
| → Dominica – Commonwealth of Dominica; Capital: Roseau | Widely recognized UN member state. |
| Dominican Republic; Capital: Santo Domingo | Widely recognized UN member state. |
=== E ===
| Ecuador – Republic of Ecuador; Capital: Quito | Widely recognized UN member state. |
| Egypt – Arab Republic of Egypt; Capital: Cairo | Widely recognized UN member state. |
| El Salvador – Republic of El Salvador; Capital: San Salvador | Widely recognized UN member state. |
| Equatorial Guinea – Republic of Equatorial Guinea; Capital: Malabo | Widely recognized UN member state. |
| → Eritrea – State of Eritrea (from 24 May 1993); Capital: Asmara | Widely recognized independent state. UN member state (from 28 May 1993). |
| Estonia – Republic of Estonia (from 20 August 1991); Capital: Tallinn | De facto independent state claimed by the Soviet Union to 6 September 1991. Widely recognized state from 6 September 1991; UN member state from 17 September 1991. |
| → → Ethiopia; Capital: Addis Ababa: People's Democratic Republic of Ethiopia (Note: The Workers' Party of Ethiopia regime collapsed on 28 May 1991.) (to 28 May 1991); Transitional Government of Ethiopia (from 28 May 1991 to 22 August 1995); Federal Democratic Republic of Ethiopia (from 22 August 1995) | Widely recognized UN member state. The province of Eritrea was under the control of a self-governing provisional government from 29 May 1991 to 23 May 1993. After 1995, Ethiopia was a federation of nine regions and two chartered cities. (Note: 9 regions: Afar, Amhara, Benishangul-Gumuz, Gambela, Harari, Oromiya, Somali, Southern Nations, Nationalities, and Peoples Region, Tigray. 2 chartered cities: Addis Ababa, Dire Dawa.) |
=== F ===
| Fiji; Capital: Suva: Republic of Fiji (to 25 July 1990) (Note: Fiji adopted a new constitution on 25 July 1990.); Sovereign Democratic Republic of Fiji (from 25 July 1990 to 27 July 1998) (Note: Fiji adopted a new constitution on 25 July 1997 which came into force on 27 July 1998.); Republic of the Fiji Islands (from 27 July 1998) | Widely recognized UN member state. Fiji had an autonomous dependency, Rotuma. |
| Finland – Republic of Finland; Capital: Helsinki | Widely recognized UN member state. EU member (from 1 January 1995). Finland had a neutral and demilitarised region: Åland |
| France – French Republic; Capital: Paris | Widely recognized UN member state. EEC member (to 1 November 1993). EU member (from 1 November 1993). France included four overseas departments: French Guiana, Guadeloupe, Martinique and Réunion. It also had sovereignty over the following overseas territories: French Polynesia, with one dependency: Clipperton Island; French Southern and Antarctic Lands (including a claim to Adélie Land which was suspended under the Antarctic Treaty.); Mayotte; New Caledonia; Saint Pierre and Miquelon; The Scattered Islands in the Indian Ocean, consisting of five uninhabited possessions: Bassas da India (disputed by Madagascar); Europa Island (disputed by Madagascar); Glorioso Islands (disputed by Madagascar, Comoros, and the Seychelles); Juan de Nova Island (disputed by Madagascar); Tromelin Island (disputed by Mauritius and the Seychelles); Wallis and Futuna; France also claimed Banc du Geyser (disputed by Madagascar and the Comoros). |
=== G ===
| Gabon – Gabonese Republic; Capital: Libreville | Widely recognized UN member state. |
| The Gambia – Republic of the Gambia; Capital: Banjul | Widely recognized UN member state. |
| Georgia (from 9 April 1991); Capital: Tbilisi: Republic of Georgia (from 9 April 1991 to 24 August 1995) (Note: Georgia declared independence from the Soviet Union on 9 April 1991.) (Note: The Republic of Georgia adopted a new constitution on 24 August 1995, changing its official name to Georgia.); Georgia (from 24 August 1995) | De facto independent state claimed by the Soviet Union until 26 December 1991. Widely recognized sovereign state from 26 December 1991; UN member state from 31 July 1992. Georgia had two autonomous republics: Adjara and Abkhazia. The latter republic was effectively self-governing from 30 September 1993 to 12 October 1999. After 12 October 1999, it was home to a de facto independent state. Georgia also included the disputed region of South Ossetia, where an unrecognized recognized breakaway republic declared independence on 29 May 1992. |
| Germany, East – German Democratic Republic (to 2 October 1990) (Note: West Germany and East Germany reunified on 3 October 1990.); Capital: East Berlin (disputed) | Widely recognized UN member state. |
| Germany, West / Germany – Federal Republic of Germany; Capital: Bonn (to 20 June 1991, seat of government to 1999), Berlin (official, from 20 June 1991) | Widely recognized UN member state. EEC member (to 1 November 1993). EU member (from 1 November 1993). Germany was a federation of sixteen states. (Note: 16 states: Baden-Württemberg, Bavaria, Berlin (from 3 October 1990), Brandenburg (from 3 October 1990), Bremen, Hamburg, Hesse, Lower Saxony, Mecklenburg-Vorpommern (from 3 October 1990), North Rhine-Westphalia, Rhineland-Palatinate, Saarland, Saxony (from 3 October 1990), Saxony-Anhalt (from 3 October 1990), Schleswig-Holstein, Thuringia (from 3 October 1990)) |
| Ghana – Republic of Ghana; Capital: Accra | Widely recognized UN member state. |
| Greece – Hellenic Republic; Capital: Athens | Widely recognized UN member state; EEC member (to 1 November 1993). EU member (from 1 November 1993). Greece had sovereignty over Mount Athos, an autonomous monastic state that was jointly governed by the multi-national "Holy Community" on the mountain and the Civil Governor appointed by the Greek Ministry of Foreign Affairs, and spiritually came under the direct jurisdiction of the Ecumenical Patriarchate. |
| Grenada; Capital: St. George's | Widely recognized UN member state; Commonwealth realm. Grenada had one autonomous dependency and it was Carriacou and Petite Martinique. |
| → Guatemala – Republic of Guatemala; Capital: Guatemala City | Widely recognized UN member state. |
| Guinea – Republic of Guinea; Capital: Conakry | Widely recognized UN member state. |
| Guinea-Bissau – Republic of Guinea-Bissau; Capital: Bissau | Widely recognized UN member state. |
| Guyana – Co-operative Republic of Guyana; Capital: Georgetown | Widely recognized UN member state. |
=== H ===
| Haiti – Republic of Haiti; Capital: Port-au-Prince | Widely recognized UN member state; Haiti claimed the uninhabited United States possession of Navassa Island. |
Holy See → Vatican City
| Honduras – Republic of Honduras; Capital: Tegucigalpa | Widely recognized UN member state. |
| Hungary – Republic of Hungary; Capital: Budapest | Widely recognized UN member state. |
=== I ===
| Iceland – Republic of Iceland; Capital: Reykjavík | Widely recognized UN member state. |
| India – Republic of India; Capital: New Delhi | Widely recognized UN member state; India was a federation of twenty-five states and seven union territories. (Note: 25 states: Andhra Pradesh, Arunachal Pradesh, Assam, Bihar, Goa, Gujarat, Haryana, Himachal Pradesh, Jammu and Kashmir, Karnataka, Kerala, Madhya Pradesh, Maharashtra, Manipur, Meghalaya, Mizoram, Nagaland, Orissa, Punjab, Rajasthan, Sikkim, Tamil Nadu, Tripura, Uttar Pradesh, West Bengal. 7 union territories: Andaman and Nicobar Islands, Chandigarh, Dadra and Nagar Haveli, Daman and Diu, Lakshadweep, National Capital Territory of Delhi, Pondicherry.) Indian sovereignty over South Tibet was disputed by China; India administered part of the disputed region of Kashmir as the state of Jammu and Kashmir. |
| Indonesia – Republic of Indonesia; Capital: Jakarta | Widely recognized UN member state. Indonesia had three special provinces: Aceh, Jakarta, and Yogyakarta. |
| Iran – Islamic Republic of Iran; Capital: Tehran | Widely recognized UN member state. |
| → Iraq; Capital: Baghdad: Iraqi Republic (until 6 January 1992); Republic of Iraq (from 6 January 1992) | Widely recognized UN member state. |
| Ireland (Note: Ireland also had the legal description of "Republic of Ireland", although this was not its constitutional name.); Capital: Dublin | Widely recognized UN member state; EEC member to 1 November 1993. EU member from 1 November 1993. Until 1 December 1998, Ireland claimed Northern Ireland, which was controlled by the United Kingdom. |
| Israel – State of Israel; Capital: Jerusalem | Widely recognized UN member state. (Note: Israel was not recognized by Afghanistan, Algeria, Bahrain, Bangladesh, Chad, Cuba, Indonesia, Iran, Iraq, Jordan (to 26 October 1994), Kuwait, Lebanon, Libya, Malaysia, North Korea, Pakistan, Saudi Arabia, Sudan, Syria, the United Arab Emirates, and Yemen.) Israel occupied East Jerusalem, the Gaza Strip the Golan Heights, the Israeli Security Zone in Southern Lebanon, and the West Bank. These areas were not generally recognized as being part of Israel. |
| Italy – Italian Republic; Capital: Rome | Widely recognized UN member state; EEC member. Italy had 5 autonomous regions and they were the Aosta Valley, Friuli-Venezia Giulia, Sardinia, Sicily, and Trentino-Alto Adige/Südtirol. |
| Ivory Coast; Capital: Yamoussoukro (official), Abidjan (seat of government): Republic of Ivory Coast (to 24 December 1999); Republic of Côte d'Ivoire (from 24 December 1999) | Widely recognized UN member state. |
=== J ===
| Jamaica; Capital: Kingston | Widely recognized UN member state; Commonwealth realm. |
| → Japan; Capital: Tokyo | Widely recognized UN member state. Japan claimed the Liancourt Rocks, which were controlled by South Korea. |
| Jordan – Hashemite Kingdom of Jordan; Capital: Amman | Widely recognized UN member state. |
=== K ===
| → → Kampuchea / Cambodia; Capital: Phnom Penh: State of Cambodia (to 15 March 1992); United Nations Transitional Authority in Cambodia (from 15 March 1992 to 24 September 1993) (Note: The United Nations Transitional Authority in Cambodia began operations on 15 March 1992.); Kingdom of Cambodia (from 24 September 1993) | Widely recognized UN member state. (Note: Although the State of Cambodia had near total control over the territory of Cambodia, the majority of the states in the world recognized the former government of Democratic Kampuchea, which retained Cambodia's UN membership. The State of Cambodia was mainly recognized by Vietnam and states within the Soviet sphere of influence.) Claimed to be the sole legitimate government of Cambodia, despite being in exile until 15 March 1992. |
| → → Kazakhstan – Republic of Kazakhstan (from 16 December 1991); Capital: Alma-Ata (to 10 December 1997, renamed Almaty in 1993), Aqmola (from 10 December 1997, renamed Astana in 1998) | De facto independent state; claimed by the Soviet Union to 26 December 1991. Widely recognized state from 26 December 1991; UN member state from 2 March 1992. |
| Kenya – Republic of Kenya; Capital: Nairobi | Widely recognized UN member state. |
| Kiribati – Republic of Kiribati; Capital: South Tarawa | Widely recognized independent state. UN member state (from 14 September 1999). |
| → Korea, North – Democratic People's Republic of Korea; Capital: Pyongyang | Widely recognized independent state. (Note: North Korea was not recognized by Estonia, France, Japan, or South Korea.) Permanent observer at the UN (to 17 September 1991). UN member state (from 17 September 1991). Claimed to be the sole legitimate government of Korea. |
| → Korea, South – Republic of Korea; Capital: Seoul | Widely recognized independent state. (Note: South Korea was not recognized by the Soviet Union to 1990, China to 1992, Romania to 1990, or North Korea.) Permanent observer at the UN (to 17 September 1991). UN member state (from 17 September 1991). Claimed to be the sole legitimate government of Korea. South Korea controlled the Liancourt Rocks, which were claimed by Japan. |
| Kuwait – State of Kuwait (to 8 August 1990, from 27 February 1991) (Note: Iraq annexed Kuwait on 8 August 1990. Following the Persian Gulf War, Kuwait was declared liberated on 27 February 1991.); Capital: Kuwait City | Widely recognized UN member state. |
| → Kyrgyzstan (from 31 August 1991); Capital: Bishkek: Republic of Kyrgyzstan (from 31 August 1991 to 5 May 1993) (Note: Kyrgyzstan declared independence from the Soviet Union on 31 August 1991.) (Note: Kyrgyzstan adopted a new constitution on 5 May 1993.); Kyrgyz Republic (from 5 May 1993) | De facto independent state; claimed by the Soviet Union to 26 December 1991. Widely recognized state from 26 December 1991; UN member state from 2 March 1992. |
=== L ===
| Laos – Lao People's Democratic Republic; Capital: Vientiane | Widely recognized UN member state. |
| Latvia – Republic of Latvia (from 21 August 1991) (Note: Latvia declared independence from the Soviet Union on 21 August 1991.); Capital: Riga | De facto independent state claimed by the Soviet Union to 6 September 1991; widely recognized state from 6 September 1991 and UN member state from 17 September 1991. |
| → Lebanon – Lebanese Republic; Capital: Beirut | Widely recognized UN member state. Lebanon was occupied by Syria. Some of Southern Lebanon was occupied by Israel. |
| Lesotho – Kingdom of Lesotho; Capital: Maseru | Widely recognized UN member state. |
| Liberia – Republic of Liberia; Capital: Monrovia | Widely recognized UN member state. |
| Libya – Great Socialist People's Libyan Arab Jamahiriya; Capital: Tripoli | Widely recognized UN member state. |
| Liechtenstein – Principality of Liechtenstein; Capital: Vaduz | Widely recognized independent state. UN member state (from 18 September 1990). The defense of Liechtenstein was the responsibility of Switzerland. |
| Lithuania – Republic of Lithuania (from 11 March 1990) (Note: Lithuania declared independence from the Soviet Union on 11 March 1990.); Capital: Vilnius | De facto independent state claimed by the Soviet Union to 6 September 1991. Widely recognized state from 6 September 1991; UN member state from 17 September 1991. |
| Luxembourg – Grand Duchy of Luxembourg; Capital: Luxembourg | Widely recognized UN member state. EEC member (to 1 November 1993). EU member (from 1 November 1993). |
=== M ===
| → → Macedonia – Republic of Macedonia (Note: Provisionally referred to by the UN and a number of countries and international organizations as "the former Yugoslav Republic of Macedonia", see Macedonia naming dispute.) (from 8 September 1991) (Note: Macedonia declared independence from Yugoslavia on 8 September 1991.); Capital: Skopje | De facto independent state claimed by Yugoslavia to 28 April 1992. Widely recognized UN member state from 8 April 1993. (Note: Macedonia was not recognized by Serbia and Montenegro until 8 April 1996.) |
| Madagascar; Capital: Antananarivo: Democratic Republic of Madagascar (to 19 August 1992); Republic of Madagascar (from 19 August 1992) | Widely recognized UN member state. Madagascar claimed the French possessions of Bassas da India, Europa Island, Glorioso Islands and Juan de Nova Island. It also claimed Banc du Geyser (disputed by Comoros and France). |
| Malawi – Republic of Malawi; Capital: Lilongwe | Widely recognized UN member state. |
| Malaysia; Capital: Kuala Lumpur (official), Putrajaya (administrative, from 1999) | Widely recognized UN member state. Malaysia was a federation of thirteen states and two federal territories. (Note: 13 states: Johor, Kedah, Kelantan, Malacca, Negeri Sembilan, Pahang, Perak, Perlis, Penang, Sabah, Sarawak, Selangor, Terengganu. 2 federal territories: Kuala Lumpur, Labuan.) Malaysia claimed part of the Spratly Islands (disputed by the People's Republic of China, the Republic of China, Vietnam, the Philippines, and Brunei). |
| Maldives – Republic of Maldives; Capital: Malé | Widely recognized UN member state. |
| Mali – Republic of Mali; Capital: Bamako | Widely recognized UN member state. |
| Malta – Republic of Malta; Capital: Valletta | Widely recognized UN member state. |
| Marshall Islands – Republic of the Marshall Islands; Capital: Majuro | Widely recognized state under a Compact of Free Association with the United States; UN member state (from 17 September 1991). The Marshall Islands claimed the United States territory of Wake Island. |
| Mauritania – Islamic Republic of Mauritania; Capital: Nouakchott | Widely recognized UN member state. |
| Mauritius; Capital: Port Louis: Mauritius (to 12 March 1992); Republic of Mauritius (from 12 March 1992) | Widely recognized UN member state. Commonwealth realm (to 12 March 1992). Mauritius had three dependencies: Agalega Islands, Cargados Carajos and Rodrigues. It claimed the British Indian Ocean Territory and the French territory of Tromelin Island. |
| Mexico – United Mexican States; Capital: Mexico City | Widely recognized UN member state. Mexico was a federation of 31 states and one federal district. (Note: 31 states: Aguascalientes, Baja California, Baja California Sur, Campeche, Chiapas, Chihuahua, Coahuila, Colima, Durango, Guanajuato, Guerrero, Hidalgo, Jalisco, México, Michoacán, Morelos, Nayarit, Nuevo León, Oaxaca, Puebla, Querétaro, Quintana Roo, San Luis Potosí, Sinaloa, Sonora, Tabasco, Tamaulipas, Tlaxcala, Veracruz, Yucatán, Zacatecas. 1 federal district: Federal District.) |
| Micronesia – Federated States of Micronesia; Capital: Palikir | Widely recognized state under Compact of Free Association with the United States. UN member state (from 17 September 1991). The FSM was a federation of four states. (Note: 4 states: Chuuk, Kosrae, Pohnpei, Yap.) |
| Moldova – Republic of Moldova (from 27 August 1991) (Note: Moldova declared independence from the Soviet Union on 27 August 1991.); Capital: Chișinău | De facto independent state claimed by the Soviet Union to 26 December 1991; widely recognized state from 26 December 1991 and UN member state from 2 March 1992. Moldova had two autonomous territorial units and they were Gagauzia and Transnistria. Both units (only Transnistria after 14 January 1995) were home to de facto independent statelets. |
| Monaco – Principality of Monaco; Capital: Monaco | Widely recognized independent state. Permanent observer at the UN (to 28 May 1993). UN member state (from 28 May 1993). The defense of Monaco was the responsibility of France. |
| → Mongolia; Capital: Ulaanbaatar: Mongolian People's Republic (to 12 February 1992); Mongolia (from 12 February 1992) | Widely recognized UN member state. |
| Morocco – Kingdom of Morocco; Capital: Rabat | Widely recognized UN member state. Morocco claimed sovereignty over and controlled most of the disputed Western Sahara, which was home to the de facto independent Sahrawi Arab Democratic Republic. Morocco disputed the Spanish sovereignty over Ceuta, Isla de Alborán, Isla Perejil, Islas Chafarinas, Melilla, and Peñón de Alhucemas. |
| Mozambique; Capital: Maputo: People's Republic of Mozambique (to 30 November 1990) (Note: Mozambique adopted a new constitution on 30 Nov 1990.); Republic of Mozambique (from 30 November 1990) | Widely recognized UN member state. |
| Myanmar – Union of Myanmar (Note: Commonly known in English as "Burma".); Capital: Yangon | Widely recognized UN member state. |
=== N ===
| Namibia – Republic of Namibia (from 21 March 1990) (Note: Namibia gained independence from a South African League of Nations mandate on 21 March 1990.); Capital: Windhoek | Widely recognized independent state. UN member state (from 23 April 1990). |
| Nauru – Republic of Nauru; Capital: Yaren (unofficial) | Widely recognized independent state. UN member state (from 14 September 1999). The defense of Nauru was the responsibility of Australia. |
| Nepal – Kingdom of Nepal; Capital: Kathmandu | Widely recognized UN member state. |
| Netherlands – Kingdom of the Netherlands; Capital: Amsterdam (official), The Hague (seat of government) | Widely recognized UN member state. The Kingdom of the Netherlands consisted of three autonomous countries: Aruba; Netherlands; Netherlands Antilles; The Kingdom of the Netherlands as a whole was a member of the EEC (to 1 November 1993) and the EU (from 1 November 1993), but Aruba and the Netherlands Antilles were not. |
| New Zealand; Capital: Wellington | Widely recognized UN member state; Commonwealth realm. New Zealand had responsibilities for the two free associated states of: Cook Islands; Niue; It also had sovereignty over two dependent territories: Ross Dependency (suspended under the Antarctic Treaty); Tokelau; The government of Tokelau claimed Swains Island, part of American Samoa (a U.S. dependence). New Zealand did not recognize this claim. |
| Nicaragua – Republic of Nicaragua; Capital: Managua | Widely recognized UN member state. |
| Niger – Republic of Niger; Capital: Niamey | Widely recognized UN member state. |
| Nigeria; Capital: Lagos (to 12 December 1991), Abuja (from 12 December 1991): Military dictatorship (to 17 November 1993); Third Republic of Nigeria (from 17 November 1993 to 29 May 1999); Fourth Republic of Nigeria (from 29 May 1999) | Widely recognized UN member state. Nigeria was a federation of 36 states and one federal territory. (Note: 36 states: Abia (from 27 August 1991), Adamawa (from 27 August 1991), Akwa Ibom, Anambra, Bauchi, Bayelsa (from 1 October 1996), Bendel (to 27 August 1991), Benue, Borno, Cross River, Delta (from 27 August 1991), Ebonyi (from 1 October 1996), Edo (from 27 August 1991), Ekiti (from 1 October 1996), Enugu (from 27 August 1991), Gombe (from 1 October 1996), Gongola (to 27 August 1991), Imo, Jigawa (from 27 August 1991), Kaduna, Kano, Katsina, Kebbi (from 27 August 1991), Kogi (from 27 August 1991), Kwara, Lagos, Nasarawa (from 1 October 1996), Niger, Ogun, Ondo, Osun (from 27 August 1991), Oyo, Plateau, Rivers, Sokoto, Taraba (from 27 August 1991), Yobe (from 27 August 1991), Zamfara (from 1 October 1996). 1 federal territory: Federal Capital Territory.) |
| Norway – Kingdom of Norway; Capital: Oslo | Widely recognized UN member state. Norway had two integral overseas areas: Jan Mayen and Svalbard. The latter of area had a special status due to the Spitsbergen Treaty. Norway had sovereignty over the following dependencies: Bouvet Island; Peter I Island (suspended under the Antarctic Treaty); Queen Maud Land (suspended under the Antarctic Treaty) |
=== O ===
| → Oman – Sultanate of Oman; Capital: Muscat | Widely recognized UN member state. |
=== P ===
| Pakistan – Islamic Republic of Pakistan; Capital: Islamabad | Widely recognized UN member state. Pakistan was a federation of four provinces and four territories; it administered part of the disputed region of Kashmir as the territories of Azad Kashmir and the Northern Areas. (Note: 4 provinces: Balochistan, North-West Frontier Province, Punjab, Sindh. 4 territories: Azad Kashmir, Federally Administered Tribal Areas, Islamabad Capital Territory, Northern Areas.) |
| Palau – Republic of Palau (from 1 October 1994) (Note: Palau's United Nations trusteeship ended on 1 October 1994.); Capital: Koror | Widely recognized state under Compact of Free Association with the United States; UN member state from 15 December 1994. |
| Panama – Republic of Panama; Capital: Panama City | Widely recognized UN member state. |
| Papua New Guinea – Independent State of Papua New Guinea; Capital: Port Moresby | Widely recognized UN member state. Commonwealth realm. |
| → Paraguay – Republic of Paraguay; Capital: Asunción | Widely recognized UN member state. |
| Peru – Republic of Peru; Capital: Lima | Widely recognized UN member state. |
| → Philippines – Republic of the Philippines; Capital: Manila | Widely recognized UN member state. The Philippines had one autonomous region: Muslim Mindanao. The Philippines administered Scarborough Shoal, which was disputed by the People's Republic of China and the Republic of China. It also claimed sovereignty over the Spratly Islands (disputed by the People's Republic of China, the Republic of China, Vietnam, Brunei, and Malaysia) and the Malaysian territory of Sabah. |
| Poland – Republic of Poland; Capital: Warsaw | Widely recognized UN member state. Poland's government was still in exile until 22 December 1990. |
| Portugal – Portuguese Republic; Capital: Lisbon | Widely recognized UN member state. EEC member (to 1 November 1993). EU member (from 1 November 1993). Portugal had two autonomous regions: the Azores and Madeira. Portugal had one Chinese territory which it administered as a dependency: Macau (to 19 December 1999); Portugal claimed sovereignty over the former colony of Portuguese Timor (which had been annexed by Indonesia) until 25 October 1999. It also claimed the Spanish municipalities of Olivenza and Táliga. |
=== Q ===
| Qatar – State of Qatar; Capital: Doha | Widely recognized UN member state. |
=== R ===
| → Romania; Capital: Bucharest | Widely recognized UN member state. |
| → Russia – Russian Federation (Note: From 25 December 1993, Russia had two equally official longform names and they were "Russia" and "Russian Federation".) (from 26 December 1991) (Note: The Soviet Union effectively ceased to exist on 12 December 1991 and officially ceased to exist on 26 December 1991 when the Supreme Soviet dissolved itself; Russia was recognized as its successor state by the UN.); Capital: Moscow | Widely recognized UN member state from 26 December 1991. Russia was a federation of 21 republics, 49 oblasts, 6 krais, 2 federal cities, 1 autonomous oblast, and 10 autonomous okrugs. (Note: 21 republics: Adygea, Altai, Bashkortostan, Buryatia, Chechnya, Chuvash Republic, Republic of Dagestan, Ingushetia, Kabardino-Balkaria, KalmykiaKarachay–Cherkessia, Karelia, Khakassia, Komi, Mari El, Mordovia, North Ossetia–Alania, Sakha, Tatarstan, Tuva, Udmurtia. 49 Oblasts: Amur, Arkhangelsk, Astrakhan, Belgorod, Bryansk, Chelyabinsk, Chita, Irkutsk, Ivanovo, Kaliningrad, Kaluga, Kamchatka, Kemerovo, Kirov, Kostroma, Kurgan, Kursk, Leningrad, Lipetsk, Magadan, Moscow, Murmansk, Nizhny Novgorod, Novgorod, Novosibirsk, Omsk, Orenburg, Oryol, Penza, Perm, Pskov, Rostov, Ryazan, Sakhalin, Samara, Saratov, Smolensk, Sverdlovsk, Tambov, Tomsk, Tula, Tver, Tyumen, Ulyanovsk, Vladimir, Volgograd, Vologda, Voronezh, Yaroslavl. 6 Krais: Altai, Khabarovsk, Krasnodar, Krasnoyarsk, Primorsky, Stavropol. 2 federal cities: Moscow, St. Petersburg. 1 Autonomous Oblast: Jewish Autonomous Oblast. 10 autonomous okrugs: Agin-Buryatia, Chukotka, Evenkia, Khanty–Mansi, Koryakia, Nenetsia, Permyakia, Taymyria, Ust-Orda Buryatia, Yamalia.) One of those republics, Tatarstan, declared state sovereignty on 6 November 1992 and was effectively self-governing until 15 February 1994. |
| Rwanda (Note: Rwanda's official French name was "République rwandaise". It could be translated into English as "Rwandese Republic", "Rwandan Republic", or "Republic of Rwanda".); Capital: Kigali | Widely recognized UN member state. |
=== S ===
| Saint Kitts and Nevis – Federation of Saint Kitts and Nevis; Capital: Basseterre | Widely recognized UN member state; Commonwealth realm. Saint Kitts and Nevis was a federation of fourteen parishes within two islands. (Note: 2 islands: Saint Kitts, Nevis. 14 parishes: Christ Church Nichola Town (Saint Kitts), Saint Anne Sandy Point (Saint Kitts), Saint George Basseterre (Saint Kitts), Saint George Gingerland (Nevis), Saint James Windward (Nevis), Saint John Capesterre (Saint Kitts), Saint John Figtree (Nevis), Saint Mary Cayon (Saint Kitts), Saint Paul Capisterre (Saint Kitts), Saint Paul Charlestown (Nevis), Saint Peter Basseterre (Saint Kitts), Saint Thomas Lowland (Nevis), Saint Thomas Middle Island (Saint Kitts), Trinity Palmetto Point (Saint Kitts)) Nevis (which was one of the islands) had autonomy. |
| Saint Lucia; Capital: Castries | Widely recognized UN member state; Commonwealth realm. |
| Saint Vincent and the Grenadines; Capital: Kingstown | Widely recognized UN member state. Commonwealth realm. |
Samoa → Western Samoa
| San Marino – Republic of San Marino; Capital: San Marino | Widely recognized independent state; UN member state from 2 March 1992. |
| São Tomé and Príncipe – Democratic Republic of São Tomé and Príncipe; Capital: São Tomé | Widely recognized UN member state; São Tomé and Príncipe had one autonomous province and it was Príncipe (from 29 April 1995). |
| Saudi Arabia – Kingdom of Saudi Arabia; Capital: Riyadh | Widely recognized UN member state. |
| Senegal – Republic of Senegal; Capital: Dakar | Widely recognized UN member state. |
| → Seychelles; Capital: Victoria: Republic of Seychelles (to 27 December 1991); Third Republic of Seychelles (from 27 December 1991) | Widely recognized UN member state; the Seychelles claimed the British Indian Ocean Territory and the French territories of Tromelin Island and the Glorioso Islands. |
| Sierra Leone – Republic of Sierra Leone; Capital: Freetown | Widely recognized UN member state. |
| Singapore – Republic of Singapore; Capital: Singapore | Widely recognized UN member state. |
| Slovakia – Slovak Republic (from 1 January 1993); Capital: Bratislava | Widely recognized independent state. UN member state (from 19 January 1993). |
| Slovenia – Republic of Slovenia (from 25 June 1991); Capital: Ljubljana | De facto independent state claimed by Yugoslavia (to 28 April 1992). Widely recognized (from 15 January 1992); UN member state (from 22 May 1992). |
| Solomon Islands; Capital: Honiara | Widely recognized UN member state. Commonwealth realm. |
| Somalia; Capital: Mogadishu: Somali Democratic Republic (to 26 January 1991) (Note: Somalia was renamed after Siad Barre's overthrow on 26 January 1991.); Interim Government of Somalia (from January 1991 to January 1997) (Note: President Ali Mahdi Muhammad of Somalia was ousted on 18 November 1991, although he continued to claim the title of President from exile. After this, there was no widely-recognized central government in the country.); Somalia (from January 1997) | Widely recognized UN member state. Somalia's internationally recognized government did not exercise full control over the country from 26 January 1991 to 18 November 1991. After 18 November 1991, Somalia did not have any recognized central government. Many areas of the country had no effective government at all or were ruled by local clans. During this period, Somalia included one state which was de facto self-governing (although it did not claim independence from Somalia): Jubaland (from 3 September 1998 to 11 June 1999); In addition, there were two states which had declared and established de facto independence from Somalia: Puntland (from 1 August 1998), and Somaliland (from 18 May 1991). |
| → South Africa – Republic of South Africa; Capital: Pretoria (administrative), Cape Town (legislative), Bloemfontein (judicial) | Widely recognized UN member state. South Africa had six autonomous bantustans: Gazankulu; KaNgwane; KwaNdebele; KwaZulu; Lebowa; QwaQwa; There were four bantustans which were nominally independent: Bophuthatswana; Ciskei; Transkei; Venda; All ten bantustans were formally abolished when a new constitution took effect on 27 April 1994. South Africa administered one League of Nations mandate: South-West Africa (to 20 March 1990) |
| Soviet Union – Union of Soviet Socialist Republics (to 26 December 1991); Capital: Moscow | Widely recognized UN member state. The Soviet Union was a federation of 15 republics, two of which (Byelorussia and Ukraine) were UN members in their own right. (Note: 15 republics: Armenia, Azerbaijan, Byelorussia, Estonia (to 6 September 1991), Georgia, Kazakhstan, Kirghizia, Latvia (to 6 September 1991), Lithuania (to 6 September 1991), Moldavia, Russian SFSR, Tajikistan, Turkmenistan, Ukraine, Uzbekistan.) |
| Spain – Kingdom of Spain; Capital: Madrid | Widely recognized UN member state; EEC member (to 1 November 1993). EU member (from 1 November 1993); Spain was divided into seventeen autonomous communities and two autonomous cities. (Note: 17 autonomous communities: Andalusia, Aragon, Asturias, Balearic Islands, Basque Country, Canary Islands, Cantabria, Castile-La Mancha, Castile and León, Catalonia, Extremadura, Galicia, Madrid, Murcia, Navarre, La Rioja, Valencian Community. 2 autonomous cities: Ceuta (from 14 March 1995), Melilla (from 14 March 1995).) Its sovereignty over Ceuta, Isla de Alborán, Isla Perejil, Islas Chafarinas, Melilla and Peñón de Alhucemas was disputed by Morocco. Its sovereignty over Olivenza and Táliga was disputed by Portugal. It claimed the British overseas territory of Gibraltar. |
| Sri Lanka – Democratic Socialist Republic of Sri Lanka; Capital: Sri Jayawardenapura-Kotte | Widely recognized UN member state. |
| Sudan – Republic of the Sudan; Capital: Khartoum | Widely recognized UN member state. After 1991, Sudan was a federation of 30 states. (Note: 30 States: Bahr el Ghazal (to 14 February 1994), Blue Nile, Central Equatoria (from 14 February 1994), Darfur (to 14 February 1994), Eastern Equatoria (from 14 February 1994), Equatoria (to 14 February 1994), Al Jazirah (from 14 February 1994), Jonglei (from 14 February 1994), Kassala, Khartoum, Kurdufan (to 14 February 1994), Lakes (from 14 February 1994), Northern Bahr el Ghazal (from 14 February 1994), North Darfur (from 14 February 1994), North Kurdufan (from 14 February 1994), Northern, Al Qadarif (from 14 February 1994), Red Sea (from 14 February 1994), River Nile (from 14 February 1994), Sennar (from 14 February 1994), South Darfur (from 14 February 1994), South Kurdufan (from 14 February 1994), Unity (from 14 February 1994), Upper Nile, Western Equatoria (from 14 February 1994), Western Bahr el Ghazal (from 14 February 1994), West Darfur (from 14 February 1994), West Kurdufan (from 14 February 1994), White Nile (from 14 February 1994), Warrap (from 14 February 1994).) |
| Suriname – Republic of Suriname; Capital: Paramaribo | Widely recognized UN member state. |
| Swaziland – Kingdom of Swaziland; Capital: Mbabane (administrative), Lobamba (royal and legislative) | Widely recognized UN member state. |
| Sweden – Kingdom of Sweden; Capital: Stockholm | Widely recognized UN member state. EU member (from 1 January 1995). |
| Switzerland – Swiss Confederation; Capital: Bern | Widely recognized independent state. Permanent observer at the UN. Switzerland was a federation of 26 cantons. (Note: 26 cantons: Aargau, Appenzell Ausserrhoden, Appenzell Innerrhoden, Basel-Stadt, Basel-Landschaft, Bern, Fribourg, Geneva, Glarus, Graubünden, Jura, Lucerne, Neuchâtel, Nidwalden, Obwalden, Schaffhausen, Schwyz, Solothurn, St. Gallen, Thurgau, Ticino, Uri, Valais, Vaud, Zug, Zürich.) |
| Syria – Syrian Arab Republic; Capital: Damascus | Widely recognized UN member state. Syria included the Golan Heights, which were occupied by Israel. It disputed the Turkish sovereignty over Hatay Province. |
=== T ===
| → Tajikistan – Republic of Tajikistan (from 9 September 1991); Capital: Dushanbe | De facto independent state; claimed by the Soviet Union to 26 December 1991. Widely recognized (from 26 December 1991). UN member state (from 2 March 1992). Tajikistan had one autonomous province: Gorno-Badakhshan. |
| Tanzania – United Republic of Tanzania; Capital: Dar es Salaam (to February 1996, seat of government from February 1996), Dodoma (official, from February 1996) | Widely recognized UN member state; Tanzania had one autonomous region and it was Zanzibar. |
| Thailand – Kingdom of Thailand; Capital: Bangkok | Widely recognized UN member state. |
| Togo – Togolese Republic; Capital: Lomé | Widely recognized UN member state. |
| Tonga – Kingdom of Tonga; Capital: Nukuʻalofa | Widely recognized independent state; UN member state (from 14 September 1999). |
| Trinidad and Tobago – Republic of Trinidad and Tobago; Capital: Port of Spain | Widely recognized UN member state; Trinidad and Tobago had one autonomous island and it was Tobago. |
| → Tunisia – Tunisian Republic; Capital: Tunis | Widely recognized UN member state. |
| Turkey – Republic of Turkey; Capital: Ankara | Widely recognized UN member state. |
| → → Turkmenistan (from 27 October 1991) (Note: Turkmenistan declared independence from the Soviet Union on 27 October 1991.); Capital: Ashgabat | De facto independent state claimed by the Soviet Union to 26 December 1991; widely recognized state from 26 December 1991 and UN member state from 2 March 1992. |
=== U ===
| Uganda – Republic of Uganda; Capital: Kampala | Widely recognized UN member state. |
| → → Ukraine (from 24 August 1991); Capital: Kiev | Widely recognized UN member state; claimed by the Soviet Union as a constituent republic until 26 December 1991. Widely recognized (from 26 December 1991); Ukraine had one autonomous republic and it was Crimea. |
| United Arab Emirates; Capital: Abu Dhabi | Widely recognized UN member state. The United Arab Emirates was a federation of seven emirates. (Note: 7 emirates: Abu Dhabi, Ajman, Dubai, Fujairah, Ras al-Khaimah, Sharjah, and Umm al-Qaiwain.) |
| United Kingdom – United Kingdom of Great Britain and Northern Ireland; Capital: London | Widely recognized UN member state; EEC member (to 1 November 1993) and EU member (from 1 November 1993). Commonwealth realm. The United Kingdom was composed of four constituent countries: England, Northern Ireland (disputed by Ireland until 1 December 1998), Scotland, and Wales. It had sovereignty over 16 dependent territories and they were: → Anguilla; → Bermuda; → British Antarctic Territory (suspended under the Antarctic Treaty); → British Indian Ocean Territory (disputed by Mauritius and the Seychelles); British Virgin Islands; → Cayman Islands; → Falkland Islands (disputed by Argentina); Gibraltar; Hong Kong (to 30 June 1997); → Montserrat; Pitcairn Islands; Saint Helena, with two dependencies; Ascension Island; Tristan da Cunha; → South Georgia and the South Sandwich Islands (disputed by Argentina); Sovereign Base Areas of Akrotiri and Dhekelia; → Turks and Caicos Islands; In addition, the British Monarch had direct sovereignty over three self-governing Crown dependencies: Guernsey, with two dependencies: Alderney; Sark; Herm; Isle of Man; Jersey |
| United States – United States of America; Capital: Washington, D.C. | Widely recognized UN member state. The United States was a federation of 50 states, one federal district, and one incorporated territory. (Note: 50 states: Alabama, Alaska, Arizona, Arkansas, California, Colorado, Connecticut, Delaware, Florida, Georgia, Hawaii, Idaho, Illinois, Indiana, Iowa, Kansas, Kentucky, Louisiana, Maine, Maryland, Massachusetts, Michigan, Minnesota, Mississippi, Missouri, Montana, Nebraska, Nevada, New Hampshire, New Jersey, New Mexico, New York, North Carolina, North Dakota, Ohio, Oklahoma, Oregon, Pennsylvania, Rhode Island, South Carolina, South Dakota, Tennessee, Texas, Utah, Vermont, Virginia, Washington, West Virginia, Wisconsin, Wyoming. 1 Federal District: District of Columbia. 1 incorporated territory: Palmyra Atoll.) It asserted sovereignty over the following inhabited insular areas: American Samoa (including Swains Island, disputed by Tokelau); Guam; Northern Mariana Islands; → Puerto Rico; United States Virgin Islands; The United States administered one United Nations Trust Territory: Trust Territory of the Pacific Islands (to 30 September 1994), consisting of one territory; Palau |
| Uruguay – Eastern Republic of Uruguay; Capital: Montevideo | Widely recognized UN member state. |
| → Uzbekistan – Republic of Uzbekistan (from 31 August 1991); Capital: Tashkent | De facto independent state claimed by the Soviet Union to 26 December 1991; widely recognized state from 26 December 1991 and UN member state from 2 March 1992. Uzbekistan had one autonomous region (or "republic"), Karakalpakstan. |
=== V ===
| Vanuatu – Republic of Vanuatu; Capital: Port Vila | Widely recognized UN member state. |
| Vatican City – Vatican City State; Capital: Vatican City | Widely recognized independent state. Vatican City was administered by the Holy See, a sovereign entity recognized by a large number of countries and a permanent observer at the United Nations. The Holy See also administered a number of extraterritorial properties in Italy. The Pope was the ex officio head of state of Vatican City. |
| Venezuela; Capital: Caracas: Republic of Venezuela (to 20 December 1999) (Note: Venezuela's new constitution came into force on 20 December 1999.); Bolivarian Republic of Venezuela (from 20 December 1999) | Widely recognized UN member state. Venezuela was a federation of 23 states, three territories, one federal dependency, and one federal district. (Note: 23 States: Amazonas (from 23 July 1992), Anzoátegui, Apure, Aragua, Barinas, Bolívar, Carabobo, Cojedes, Delta Amacuro (from 8 March 1991), Falcón, Guárico, Lara, Mérida, Miranda, Monagas, Nueva Esparta, Portuguesa, Sucre, Táchira, Trujillo, Vargas (from 31 December 1998), Yaracuy, Zulia. 3 Territories: Amazonas (to 23 July 1992), Delta Amacuro (to 8 March 1991), Vargas (from 22 April 1998 to 31 December 1998). 1 Federal District: Federal District (renamed Capital District on 20 December 1999). 1 Federal Dependency: Federal Dependencies.) |
| Vietnam – Socialist Republic of Vietnam; Capital: Hanoi | Widely recognized UN member state. Vietnam claimed sovereignty over the Paracel Islands (disputed by China and Taiwan) and Spratly Islands (disputed by the People's Republic of China, the Republic of China, Brunei, the Philippines, and Malaysia). |
=== W ===
| Western Samoa / Samoa; Capital: Apia: Independent State of Western Samoa (to 4 July 1997) (Note: Western Samoa's constitution was amended on 4 July 1997 to change the name of the country to Samoa.); Independent State of Samoa (from 4 July 1997) | Widely recognized UN member state. |
=== Y ===
| Yemen – Republic of Yemen (from 22 May 1990); Capital: Sana'a | Widely recognized UN member state. |
| Yemen, North – Yemen Arab Republic (to 22 May 1990); Capital: Sana'a | Widely recognized UN member state. |
| Yemen, South; Capital: Aden: People's Democratic Republic of Yemen (to 22 May 1990); Democratic Republic of Yemen (from 21 May 1994 to 7 July 1994) (Note: The former South Yemen declared independence on 21 May 1994. Aden fell to Northern Yemeni forces on 7 July 1994.) | Widely recognized UN member state (to 22 May 1990). De facto independent state (from 7 July 1994). Claimed by Yemen. (from 7 July 1994). |
| Yugoslavia – Socialist Federal Republic of Yugoslavia (to 27 April 1992); Capital: Belgrade (Note: The Federal Republic of Yugoslavia was created on 27 April 1992, ending the Socialist Federal Republic of Yugoslavia.) | Widely recognized independent state and UN member state to 27 April 1992. Yugoslavia was a federation of six republics, four of which (Bosnia and Herzegovina, Croatia, Macedonia, and Slovenia) declared independence in 1991 and 1992. The two remaining republics, Montenegro and Serbia, established the Federal Republic of Yugoslavia on 27 April 1992. It claimed to continue Yugoslavia's international personality, but this claim was not widely recognized. |
=== Z ===
| → Zaire / Congo, Democratic Republic of the Capital: Kinshasa: Republic of Zaire (to 17 May 1997) (Note: Laurent-Désiré Kabila took power on 17 May 1997 and renamed Zaire again the Democratic Republic of the Congo.); Democratic Republic of the Congo (from 17 May 1997) | Widely recognized UN member state. |
| → Zambia; Capital: Lusaka | Widely recognized UN member state. |
| Zimbabwe – Republic of Zimbabwe; Capital: Harare | Widely recognized UN member state. |

== Non-UN members or observers ==
=== Widely-recognized ===
| Name and capital city | Information on status and recognition of sovereignty |
|---|---|
| Serbia and Montenegro – Federal Republic of Yugoslavia (from 27 April 1992); Capital: Belgrade | Widely recognized independent state from 27 April 1992. Serbia and Montenegro was a federation of two republics, Montenegro and Serbia. Serbia and Montenegro claimed to continue Yugoslavia's international personality, but this claim was not widely recognized. Serbia itself included two autonomous provinces, which were Vojvodina and Kosovo and Metohija. The latter province was under the administration of the United Nations Interim Administration Mission in Kosovo from 10 June 1999. |
| → → → Tuvalu; Capital: Funafuti | Widely recognized independent state and Commonwealth realm. |

=== Others ===
| Name and capital city | Information on status and recognition of sovereignty |
|---|---|
| Abkhazia – Republic of Abkhazia (from 25 August 1990) (Note: Abkhazia re-declared independence from Georgia on 12 October 1999 (Act of State Independence of the Republic of Abkhazia), although it had been effectively self-governing since the end of the War in Abkhazia on 30 September 1993.); Capital: Sukhumi | De facto independent state not recognized by any other state; claimed by Georgia as the Autonomous Republic of Abkhazia. |
| → Afghanistan, Islamic Emirate of (from 26 September 1996) (Note: The Taliban took over Kabul on 26 September 1996 and proclaimed the Islamic Emirate of Afghanistan.); Capital: Kabul | Partially recognized de facto independent state; (Note: The Islamic Emirate of Afghanistan was recognized by Pakistan, Saudi Arabia, and the United Arab Emirates.) claimed to be the sole legitimate government of Afghanistan, but this was not recognized by the UN or most countries. |
| Anjouan – State of Anjouan (from 3 August 1997) (Note: Anjouan declared independence from the Comoros on 3 August 1997.); Capital: Mutsamudu | De facto independent state. Not recognized by any other state. Claimed by the Comoros. |
| Bophuthatswana – Republic of Bophuthatswana (to 13 March 1994); Capital: Mmabatho | Nominally independent South African bantustan. (Note: The nominally independent bantustans of Bophuthatswana, Ciskei, Transkei, and Venda were only recognized by South Africa and by each other. The rest of the world regarded them as part of South Africa.) |
| Bougainville – Republic of Bougainville (from 17 May 1990 to 24 December 1998) (Note: The Republic of Bougainville declared independence on 17 May 1990. After a lengthy peace process started in 1997, the Bougainville Interim Government agreed to give up their self-declared independence and establish a reconciliation government on 24 December 1998.); Capital: Arawa | De facto independent state. Not recognized by any other state. Claimed by Papua New Guinea. |
| Cambodia, State of (to 15 March 1992); Capital: Phnom Penh | Partially recognized de facto independent state. Claimed to be the sole legitimate government of Cambodia. |
| Chechnya (from 1 November 1991); Capital: Grozny (renamed Dzhokhar-Ghala in 1996): Chechen Republic (from 1 November 1991 to 12 March 1992) (Note: The Chechen Republic of Ichkeria enacted its constitution on 12 March 1992.); Chechen Republic of Ichkeria (from 12 March 1992) | Partially recognized de facto independent state; (Note: Chechnya was recognized by the Islamic Emirate of Afghanistan.) claimed by Russia as the Republic of Chechnya. |
| Ciskei – Republic of Ciskei (to 13 March 1994); Capital: Bisho | Nominally independent South African bantustan. |
| Cook Islands; Capital: Avarua | A state in free association with New Zealand, recognized by China (from 25 July 1997). The Cook Islands is a member of multiple UN agencies with full treaty making capacity; it shares a head of state with New Zealand as well as having shared citizenship. |
| Gagauzia – Gagauz Republic (from 19 August 1990 to 14 January 1995); Capital: Comrat | De facto independent state; not recognized by any other state. Claimed by the Soviet Union until 26 December 1991 and by Moldova from 27 August 1991 to 14 January 1995. |
| Kosova – Republic of Kosova (from 22 September 1991 to 31 January 2000); Capital: Pristina | Partially recognized de facto independent state; only recognized by Albania. Claimed by Serbia. |
| Kunar – Islamic Emirate of Kunar (from January 1991 to 20 April 1991); Capital: Asadabad | De facto independent state. Not recognized by any other state. Claimed by Afghanistan. |
| Mindanao – Federal Republic of Mindanao (from 4 October to 6 October 1990); Capital: Cagayan de Oro (de facto) | De facto independent state. Not recognized by any other state. Claimed by the Philippines. |
| Mohéli – Democratic Republic of Mohéli (from 11 August 1997) (Note: Mohéli declared independence from the Comoros on 11 August 1997.); Capital: Fomboni | De facto independent state. Not recognized by any other state. Claimed by the Comoros. |
| Nagorno-Karabakh – Nagorno-Karabakh Republic (from 6 January 1992) (Note: The Nagorno-Karabakh Republic declared independence from Azerbaijan on 6 January 1992.); Capital: Stepanakert | De facto independent state; not recognized by any other state. Claimed by Azerbaijan. |
| Niue; Capital: Alofi | A state in free association with New Zealand. Niue is a member of multiple UN agencies with full treaty making capacity. It had shared citizenship with New Zealand. |
| Northern Cyprus – Turkish Republic of Northern Cyprus; Capital: Lefkoşa | Partially recognized de facto independent state, recognized only by Turkey. Claimed by the Republic of Cyprus. |
| Palestine – State of Palestine (Note: See the following on statehood criteria: Mendes, Errol (30 March 2010), Statehood and Palestine for the purposes of Article 12 (3) of the ICC Statute (PDF), 30 March 2010, pp. 28, 33: "...the Palestinian State also meets the traditional criteria under the Montevideo Convention..."; "...the fact that a majority of states have recognized Palestine as a State should easily fulfill the requisite state practice".; McKinney, Kathryn M. (1994), "The Legal Effects of the Israeli-PLO Declaration ofPrinciples: Steps Toward Statehood for Palestine", Seattle University Law Review, 18 (93), Seattle University: 97, archived from the original on 2011-07-22: "It is possible, however, to argue for Palestinian statehood based on the constitutive theory".; McDonald, Avril (Spring 2009), "Operation Cast Lead: Drawing the Battle Lines of the Legal Dispute", Human Rights Brief, 25, Washington College of Law, Center for Human Rights and Humanitarian Law: "Whether one applies the criteria of statehood set out in the Montevideo Convention or the more widely accepted constitutive theory of statehood, Palestine might be considered a state."); Capital: Ramallah (administrative), Gaza City (administrative), Jerusalem (claimed) | Disputed region consisting of three occupied territories: the West Bank, the Gaza Strip, and East Jerusalem. The declared State of Palestine, which claimed independence for all the Palestinian territories, was recognized by a large number of countries. In foreign relations, Palestine was represented by the Palestine Liberation Organization, which was a permanent observer at the United Nations. The Palestinian National Authority (established on 4 May 1994) was an interim administrative body that exercised limited control over parts of the West Bank and the Gaza Strip. |
| Puntland – Puntland State of Somalia (from 1 August 1998) (Note: Puntland declared temporary independence from Somalia on 1 August 1998.); Capital: Garowe | De facto independent state. Not recognized by any other state. Claimed by Somalia. |
| Republika Srpska (from 7 April 1992 to 14 December 1995); Capital: Banja Luka: Serbian Republic of Bosnia and Herzegovina (from 7 April 1992 to 12 August 1992) (Note: The Serbian Republic of Bosnia and Herzegovina declared independence on 7 April 1992.) (Note: The name Republika Srpska was adopted on 12 August 1992.); Republika Srpska (from 12 August 1992 to 14 December 1995) | De facto independent state until 14 December 1995 not recognized by any other state; claimed by Bosnia and Herzegovina and recognized as such by the UN. |
| Sahrawi Arab Democratic Republic; Capital: Bir Lehlou (official), Rabouni (seat of government-in-exile), El Aaiún (claimed) | Partially recognized de facto independent state. The Sahrawi Arab Democratic Republic claimed the disputed territory of Western Sahara, most of which was under control of Morocco. The territories under its control, the so-called Free Zone, were claimed by Morocco. Its government resided in exile at Tindouf in Algeria. |
| → Somaliland – Republic of Somaliland (from 18 May 1991); Capital: Hargeisa | De facto independent state. Not recognized by any other state. Claimed by Somalia. |
| South Ossetia – Republic of South Ossetia (from 29 May 1992); Capital: Tskhinvali | De facto independent state. Not recognized by any other state. Claimed by Georgia. |
| Taiwan – Republic of China; Capital: Taipei (seat of government), Nanjing (claimed) | Partially recognized de facto independent state but de jure widely recognized UN member state. The Republic of China claimed to be the sole legitimate government of China, but only administered Taiwan, Kinmen, the Matsu Islands, Pratas Island and Itu Aba. The Republic of China had territorial claims over Mongolia; the Russian republic of Tuva; the Sixty-Four Villages East of the River (administered by Russia); The majority of Gorno-Badakhshan (administered by Tajikistan); The eastern tip of the Wakhan Corridor (administered by Afghanistan); a small portion of Gilgit-Baltistan (administered by Pakistan and part of the disputed Kashmir region); Aksai Chin (administered by the People's Republic of China and part of the disputed Kashmir region); eastern Bhutan; South Tibet (controlled by India); and Kachin State (administered by Myanmar). |
| Tamil Eelam; Capital: Trincomalee | Unrecognized de facto self-governing entity. Claimed by Sri Lanka. |
| Tatarstan – Tatar Soviet Socialist Republic (from 6 November 1992 to 15 February 1994); Capital: Kazan | De facto independent state. De facto part of the Russian Federation since 15 February 1994. De jure since March 2002. |
| Transkei – Republic of Transkei (to 27 April 1994) (Note: Transkei ceased to exist on 27 April 1994, when South Africa's interim constitution took effect.); Capital: Umtata | Nominally independent South African bantustan (until 27 April 1994). |
| Transnistria (from 25 August 1991); Capital: Tiraspol: Pridnestrovian Moldavian Soviet Socialist Republic (from 25 August 1991 to 5 November 1991) (Note: Transnistria had declared its independence from Moldova (but within the Soviet Union) on 2 September 1990. The Soviet Union did not recognize that declaration, leading to Transnistria's full declaration of independence on 25 August 1991.); Pridnestrovian Moldavian Republic (from 5 November 1991) | De facto independent state not recognized by any other country; claimed by the Soviet Union to 26 December 1991 and Moldova from 27 August 1991. |
| Venda – Republic of Venda (to 27 April 1994) (Note: Venda ceased to exist on 27 April 1994, when South Africa's interim constitution took effect.); Capital: Thohoyandou | Nominally independent South African bantustan. |
| Vevčani – Republic of Vevčani (from 19 September 1991 to 8 April 1993); Capital: Vevčani | De facto independent state. Not recognized by any other state. Claimed by Macedonia. |
| Western Bosnia – Republic of Western Bosnia (from 26 July 1995 to 7 August 1995) (Note: The Autonomous Province of Western Bosnia declared itself an independent Republic on 26 July 1995; it was conquered by Bosnia and Herzegovina on 7 August 1995.) | De facto independent state. Not recognized by any other state. Claimed by Bosnia and Herzegovina. |

== Other entities ==
Excluded from the list above are the following noteworthy entities which either were not fully sovereign or did not claim to be independent:

- Antarctica as a whole had no government and no permanent population. Seven states claimed portions of Antarctica and five of these had reciprocally recognised one another's claims. These claims, which were regulated by the Antarctic Treaty System, were neither recognised nor disputed by any other signatory state.
- East Timor was occupied and administered by Indonesia until October 1999 as Timor Timur, but this was not recognized by the United Nations, which considered it to be Portuguese territory under Indonesian occupation. In October 1999, Indonesia relinquished control over the territory to the United Nations Transitional Administration in East Timor, which took over responsibility for it.
- Estonia was a part of the Soviet Union until August 1991, but its annexation was not widely recognized. A government in exile claimed independence for Estonia until 15 September 1992, but aside from its embassies in the West it controlled no territory.
- The European Union was a sui generis supranational organisation which had 12 (later 15) member states. It was established on 1 November 1993. The member states had transferred a measure of their legislative, executive, and judicial powers to the institutions of the EU, and as such the EU had some elements of sovereignty, without generally being considered a sovereign state. The European Union did not claim to be a sovereign state and had only limited capacity for relations with other states.
- Kosovo was a territory that was nominally part of Serbia and Montenegro, but after 10 June 1999 came under United Nations administration as part of the United Nations Interim Administration Mission in Kosovo.
- Latvia was a part of the Soviet Union until 1991, but its annexation was not widely recognized. A government in exile claimed independence for Latvia until 21 August 1991, but aside from its embassies in the West it controlled no territory.
- Lithuania was a part of the Soviet Union until 1990, but its annexation was not widely recognized. Stasys Lozoraitis Jr. claimed independence for Lithuania until 6 September 1991, but aside from its embassies in the West it controlled no territory.
- The Sovereign Military Order of Malta was an entity claiming sovereignty and (from 24 August 1994) a United Nations observer. The order had bi-lateral diplomatic relations with a large number of states, but had no territory other than extraterritorial areas within Rome. The order's Constitution stated: "The Order is a subject of international law and exercises sovereign functions." Although the order frequently asserted its sovereignty, it did not claim to be a sovereign state. It lacked a defined territory. Since all its members were citizens of other states, almost all of them lived in their native countries, and those who resided in the order's extraterritorial properties in Rome did so only in connection with their official duties, the order lacked the characteristic of having a permanent population.
- The United Nations Transitional Administration in East Timor was a transitional non-independent territory governed by the United Nations. It was neither sovereign nor under the sovereignty of any other state. It was established on 25 October 1999, following the end of the Indonesian occupation of East Timor.
- West Berlin was a political enclave that was closely aligned with – but not actually a part of – West Germany. It consisted of three occupied sectors administered by the United States, the United Kingdom, and France. West Berlin was incorporated into the reunified Germany on 3 October 1990.

== See also ==
- List of sovereign states by year
- 1990s
- List of state leaders in 1990
- List of state leaders in 1991
- List of state leaders in 1992
- List of state leaders in 1993
- List of state leaders in 1994
- List of state leaders in 1995
- List of state leaders in 1996
- List of state leaders in 1997
- List of state leaders in 1998
- List of state leaders in 1999
