= Germany–Liechtenstein relations =

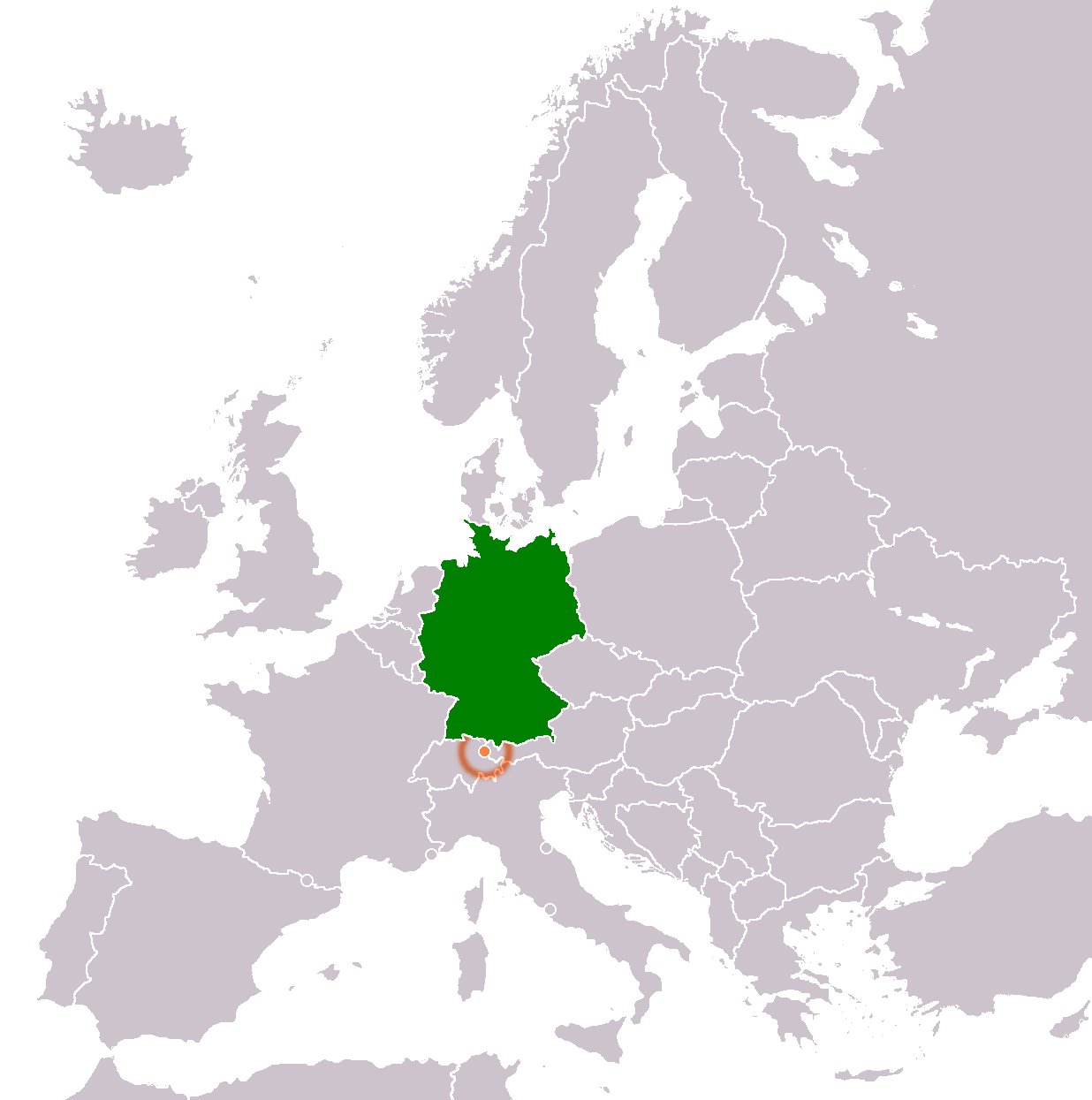

- Germany: Liechtenstein

Germany–Liechtenstein relations are the diplomatic relations between Germany and Liechtenstein. Both states are members of the Organization for Security and Cooperation in Europe (OSCE), the Council of Europe and the European Economic Area.

Liechtenstein is the only German-speaking state in which German is the sole official and national language. The heads of state of both countries participate in the annual meeting of German-speaking countries.

== History ==
During Roman times, today's Liechtenstein territory was part of the Roman province of Raetia, just like today's Grisons, Vorarlberg, southern Bavaria and Upper Swabia. In the 8th century, Raetia - and thus today's Liechtenstein territory - was incorporated into the Frankish Empire. When it was divided, it became part of the Eastern Frankish Empire, which in turn became the Holy Roman Empire in 962. Until the dissolution of the Empire in 1806, Liechtenstein remained a part of it, which accounts for the historical depth and closeness of German-Liechtenstein relations.

In 1806 Liechtenstein gained its sovereignty, but as a member of the Confederation of the Rhine it maintained intensive contacts with the German states. Relations with Austria were particularly close, and a customs treaty was concluded with this neighboring state in 1852. During the First World War, Liechtenstein remained neutral but held sympathies to the Central Powers. In the post-war period, the principality broke away from Austria and concluded a customs treaty with Switzerland.

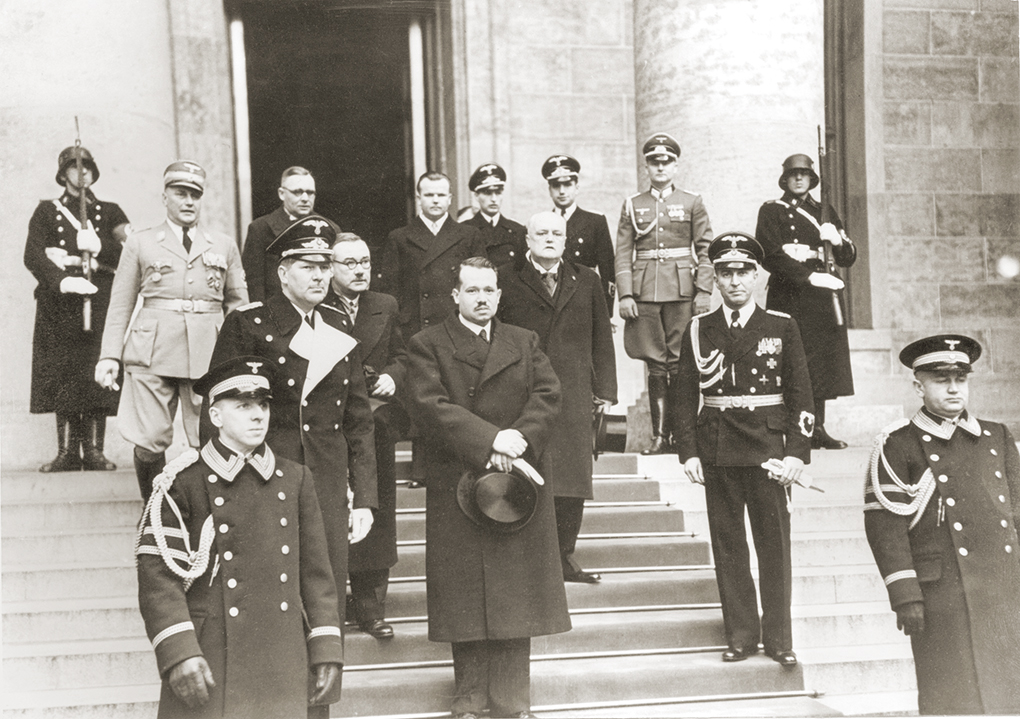
Franz Joseph II with members of the Liechtenstein government outside the Reich Chancellery in Berlin on 2 March 1939.

In 1939, the National Socialist German National Movement in Liechtenstein attempted to instigate a coup in Liechtenstein in order to provoke it's annexation into Nazi Germany with unofficial support from German officials in Feldkirch, but it failed. Liechtenstein remained neutral during the Second World War. Although there were planning plots by the German Wehrmacht to annex Liechtenstein, particularly in Operation Tannenbaum, these were never implemented. During the war, Franz Joseph II periodically sent congratulatory letters to Adolf Hitler throughout the war, such as the thwarting of the 20 July plot, of which he briefly replied.

In the postwar period, Liechtenstein transformed from a poor agricultural state into a service-providing economy. Today, the main economic sector is in the tertiary sector: banks, trustees, and other financial services. Liechtenstein levies comparatively low taxes, which is why it is considered a tax haven by the German government, among others. In total, funds of hundreds of German residents amounting to several billion euros are said to have flowed through Liechtenstein's LGT Bank and other banks, primarily into foundations set up under local law. In the 2008 Liechtenstein tax affair numerous German tax evaders were exposed: Internal bank data had been illegally stolen from LGT Bank by a former bank employee. The purchase of the data by Germany strained diplomatic relations with Liechtenstein. As a result of the Liechtenstein tax affair, loans to German museums already promised by the Princely House of Liechtenstein were withdrawn by Hereditary Prince Alois von und zu Liechtenstein. This act was justified by "questionable basic principles of the rule of law", but the German media assume that this was an expression of the Princely House's disgruntlement.

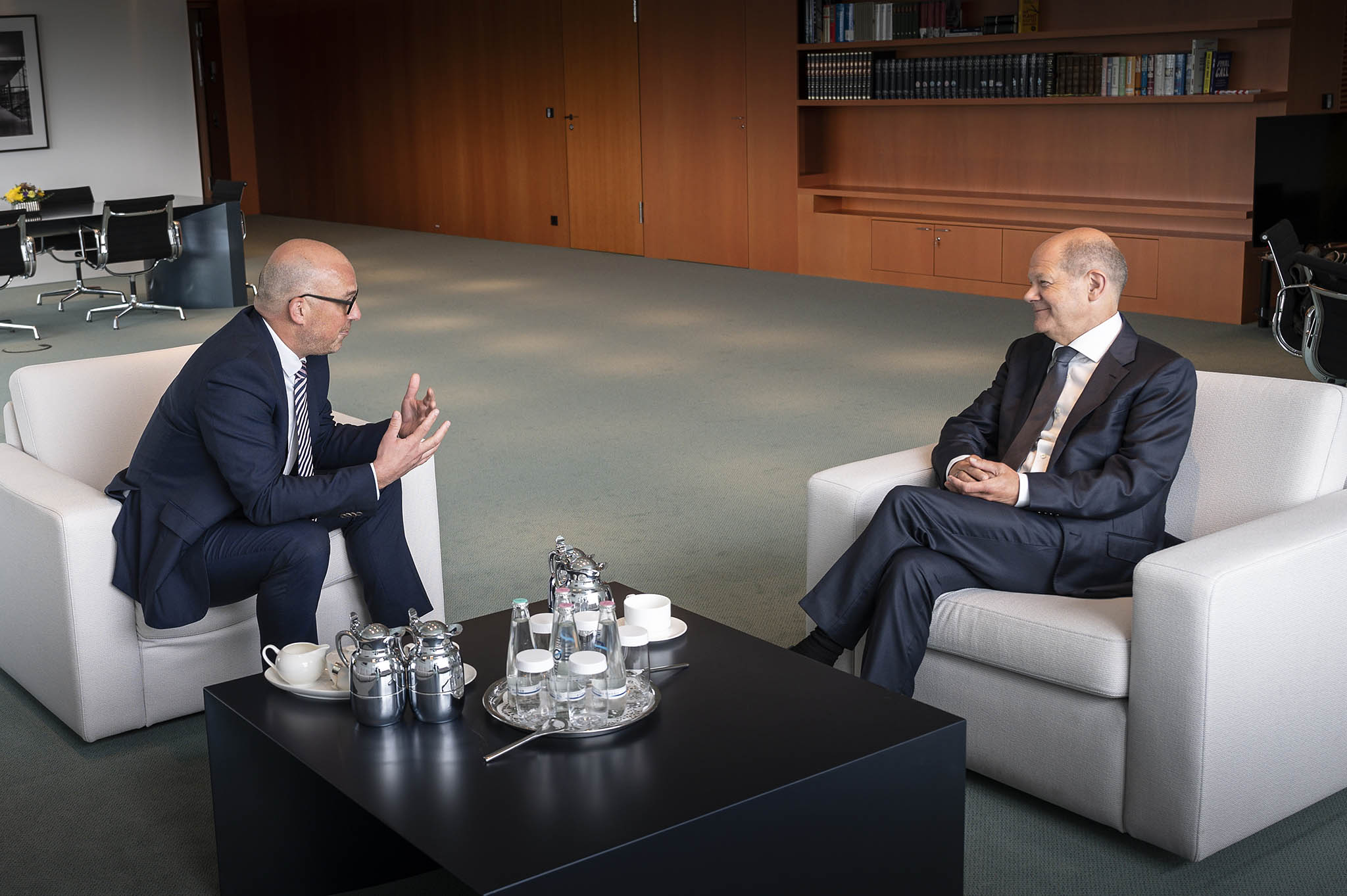
Daniel Risch and Olaf Scholz in 2022.

In 2008, the reigning Prince of Liechtenstein Hans-Adam II used the expression of a "Fourth Reich" in a letter about German-Liechtenstein relations. In addition, he described the relations between the two countries as a "rollercoaster ride" and commented that they hoped for "better times" in this regard. A bilateral tax agreement in accordance with OECD standards entered into force in 2010, and a comprehensive double taxation agreement in 2012.

== Economic relations ==
After Switzerland, Germany is the most important economic partner for Liechtenstein. In 2021, the bilateral trade volume was 1.4 billion euros, placing Liechtenstein 74th in the ranking of Germany's trading partners. Liechtenstein is a tax haven for some German corporations and individuals.

== Diplomatic missions ==
- Germany is accredited to Liechtenstein from its embassy in Bern, Switzerland and maintains an honorary consulate in Vaduz.
- Liechtenstein has an embassy in Berlin.

== See also ==
- Foreign relations of Germany
- Foreign relations of Liechtenstein
- Liechtenstein–European Union relations
