= Austria–Liechtenstein relations =

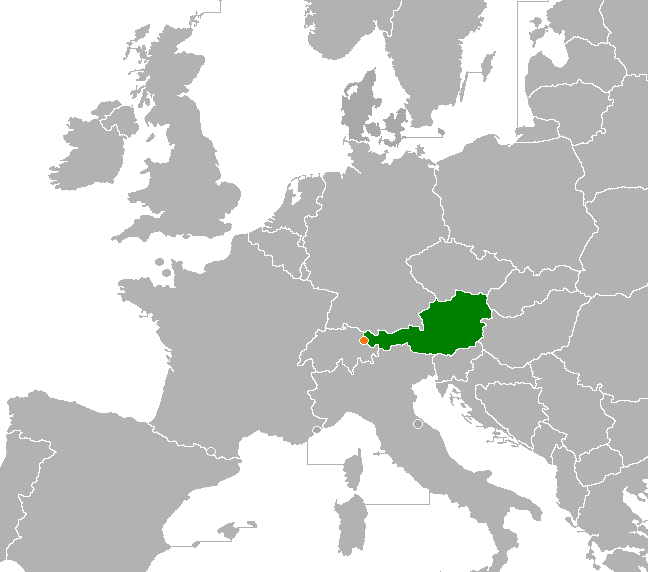

- Austria: Liechtenstein

Austria–Liechtenstein relations are foreign relations between Austria and Liechtenstein. Austria has an Honorary Consulate General in Mauren. Liechtenstein has an diplomatic representation in Vienna. Both countries are full members of the Council of Europe and Organization for Security and Co-operation in Europe.

== Resident diplomatic missions ==
- Austria has an Honorary Consulate General in Mauren.
- Liechtenstein has an diplomatic representation in Vienna.

== See also ==
- Foreign relations of Austria
- Foreign relations of Liechtenstein
- Liechtenstein–European Union relations
