= Czech Republic–Liechtenstein relations =

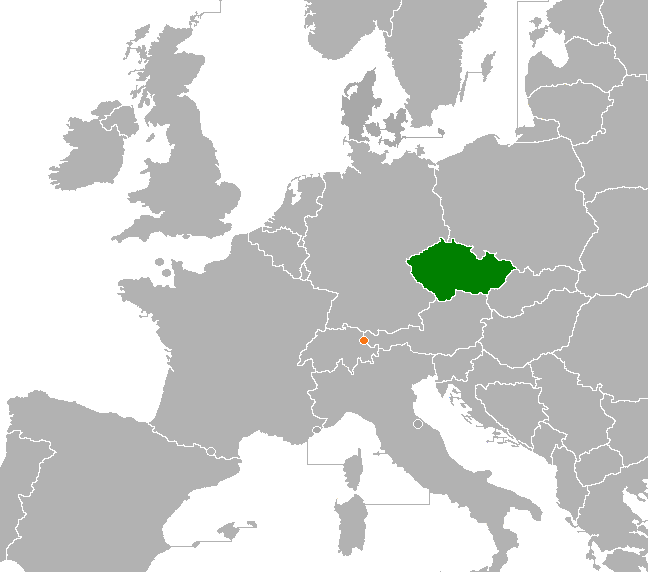

- Czech Republic: Liechtenstein

Czech Republic–Liechtenstein relations are the bilateral relations between the Czech Republic and Liechtenstein, originating from the independence of Czechoslovakia in 1918. Historically, relations between the two countries had been tense, particularly with disputes regarding the seizure of Liechtenstein land and assets in Czechoslovakia. The two countries did not establish diplomatic relations until 13 July 2009.

The Czech Republic does not have an embassy in Liechtenstein, but the Czech ambassador to Switzerland, located in Bern, is also accredited to Liechtenstein. Similarly, the Swiss embassy in Prague also represents Liechtenstein.

== History ==
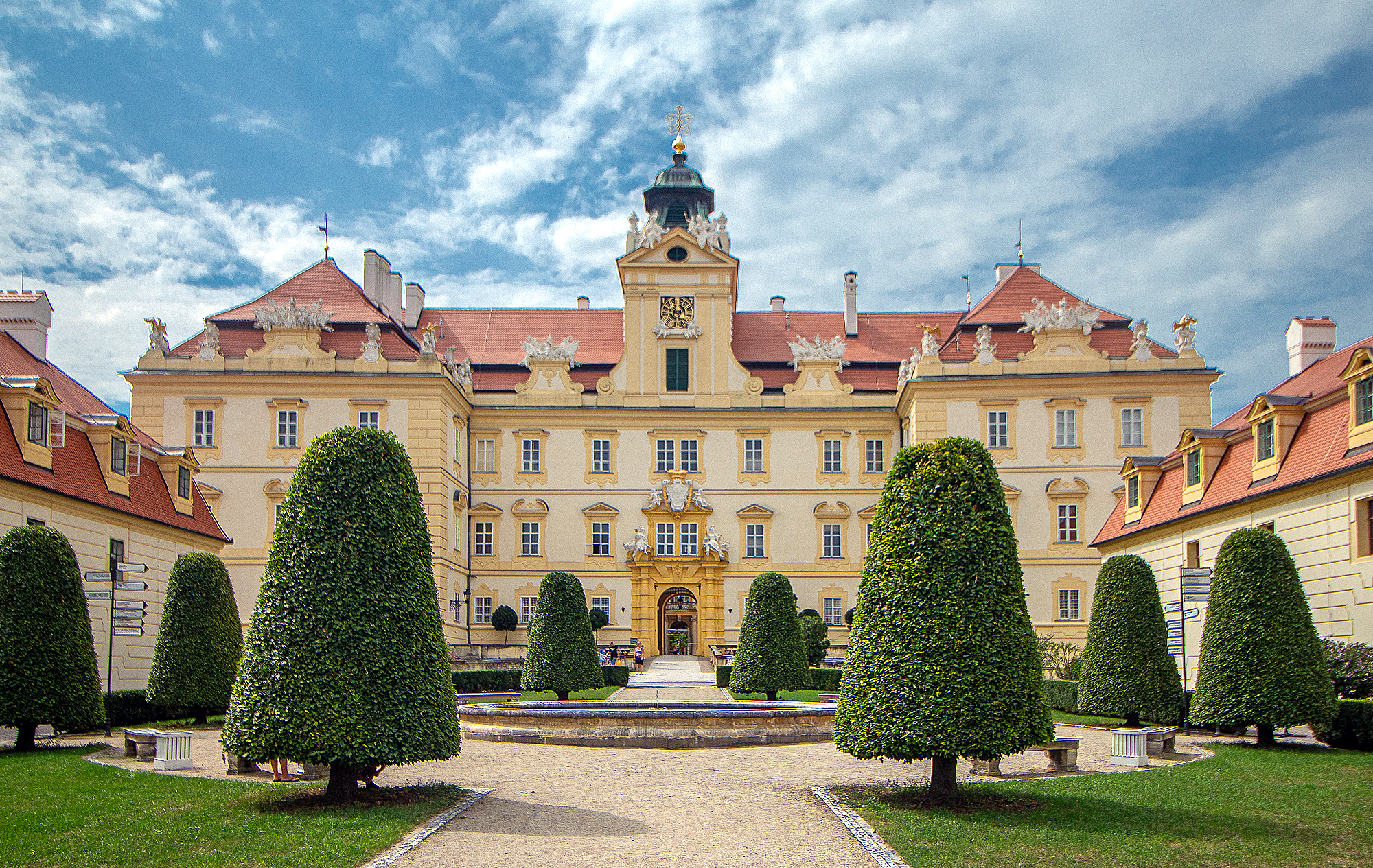
Valtice Castle was the main residence of the House of Liechtenstein until 1918

In 1918, Czechoslovakia gained its independence from Austria-Hungary at the end of World War I. Liechtenstein, though neutral, was closely tied to Austria-Hungary throughout the war and was sympathetic to the Central Powers, as the two countries had been in a customs union since 1852. As such, Czechoslovakia deemed the House of Liechtenstein to be subordinate to the House of Habsburg and included its land and properties within the country to be expropriated as part of the 1918 land reform act. In addition, Czechoslovakia refused to recognize Liechtenstein as a sovereign state and also refused the establishment of a Liechtenstein embassy in Prague in 1923.

In agreement with Switzerland in July 1938, Czechoslovakia indirectly recognized Liechtenstein's sovereignty by allowing its interests to be represented via Switzerland. In March 1939, Czechoslovakia was occupied by Nazi Germany.

Liechtenstein was neutral throughout World War II, and its neutrality was not violated by any of the combatants. In 1945, Czechoslovakia instated the Beneš decrees, which included Liechtenstein citizens and assets as German. Czechoslovakia subsequently broke diplomatic relations with Liechtenstein and permanently seized all land and assets in the country belonging to Liechtenstein, particularly that of the House of Liechtenstein. Liechtenstein has continuously considered this seizure as a violation of international law.

Relations between Czechoslovakia and Liechtenstein remained tense throughout the Cold War due to the land seizure. Czechoslovakia did not acknowledge the previous indirect recognition of Liechtenstein's sovereignty in 1938. In 1993, Czechoslovakia was succeeded by the Czech Republic, and Liechtenstein abstained from voting regarding the country's accession to the Council of Europe the same year. In 2003, the Czech Republic refused to recognize Liechtenstein as having become a sovereign state in 1806, which delayed an agreement regarding the expansion of the European Economic Area for around one month.

On 13 July 2009 the Czech Republic and Liechtenstein formally recognised each other and established diplomatic relations for the first time. The two countries signed a correspondence treaty on 8 September 2009. Hans-Adam II, Prince of Liechtenstein also stated that the country would not take any further action regarding the seizures in 1945. In February 2020, the Czech Constitutional court in Brno rejected a case made by Liechtenstein to get the Czech government to change their classification of the House of Liechtenstein as German under the Beneš decrees. On 19 August 2020, an inter-state application under the European Convention on Human Rights was made by Liechtenstein to the European Court of Human Rights against the Czech Republic.

== Bibliography ==
- Geiger, Peter (1997). Liechtenstein in den Dreissigerjahren 1928–1939 (in German) (2nd ed.). Zürich: Liechtenstein Institute. ISBN 3-906393-28-3.
- Rothwell, Victor (2001). The Origins of the Second World War. Manchester: Manchester University Press. ISBN 978-0-7190-5958-2.
